= List of heads of state of Mali =

President of the Republic of Mali
- Mali Jamanakuntigi (Bambara)
- Emblem of Mali

- Incumbent; Assimi Goita since 24 May 2021 (Note: As de facto president until 28 May 2021, and as interim president until 8 July 2025.)
- Style: Mr. President (informally); His Excellency (formal and diplomatic)
- Type: Head of state; Head of government; Commander-in-chief
- Residence: Koulouba Palace, Bamako
- Term length: Five years, renewable once
- Constituting instrument: Constitution of Mali
- Precursor: Colonial governor of Mali
- Formation: 20 June 1960; 66 years ago
- First holder: Modibo Keïta
- Succession: Line of succession
- Deputy: President of the National Assembly (de facto)
- Salary: US$68,900 annually
- Website: Koulouba

The president of the Republic of Mali (Bambara: Mali Jamanakuntigi) is the head of state and head of government of Mali. The president leads the government and is the commander-in-chief of the Malian Armed Forces.

A total of seven people have served as head of state of Mali (excluding three acting presidents). Additionally, two people, Amadou Toumani Touré and Assimi Goïta, have served on two non-consecutive occasions.

The current head of state of Mali is interim president Assimi Goïta, who took power for a second time on 24 May 2021, after dismissing previous interim president Bah Ndaw in the 2021 coup d'état. He has since been constitutionally declared interim president of Mali. Since the 2023 constitutional referendum held during Goita's leadership, Mali has shifted from a semi-presidential to a full presidential system, with the president serving as the head of government and dictating the policies of the government.

== Term limits ==
As of 2021, there is a two-term limit for the president in the Constitution of Mali. The term limit has not been met by any president yet.

== Succession ==
Article 53 of the Constitution entrusts the Prime Minister with the duties of the presidency during temporary absences. In the case of a definitive vacancy due to resignation, death, or permanent incapacitation, the President of the National Assembly assumes the functions of the president for a period of 90 to 120 days until a new president can be elected.

== Titles ==
- 1960–1965: Head of State
- 1965–1968: President of the Republic
- 1968–1969: Chairman of the Military Committee for National Liberation
- 1969–1979: Head of State
- 1979–1991: President of the Republic
- 1991: Chairman of the National Reconciliation Council
- 1991–1992: Chairman of the Transitional Committee for the Salvation of the People
- 1992–2012: President of the Republic
- 2012: Chairman of the National Committee for the Restoration of Democracy and State
- 2012–2020: President of the Republic
- 2020: Chairman of the National Committee for the Salvation of the People
- 2020–2025: President of the Transition
- 2025–present: President of the Republic

== List of officeholders ==
Political parties

Sudanese Union – African Democratic Rally (US–RDA)
Democratic Union of the Malian People (UDPM)
Alliance for Democracy in Mali – Pan-African Party for Liberty, Solidarity and Justice (ADEMA–PASJ)
Rally for Mali (RPM)

Other factions

Military
Independent

Status

Acting President

No.	Portrait	Name (Birth–Death)	Term of office			Political party	Elected	Cabinet(s)	Prime minister(s)	Ref.
No.	Portrait	Name (Birth–Death)	Took office	Left office	Time in office	Political party	Elected	Cabinet(s)	Prime minister(s)	Ref.
1		Modibo Keïta (1915–1977)	20 June 1960	19 November 1968 (deposed)	8 years, 152 days	US–RDA	1960	—N/a	Himself	
1		Modibo Keïta (1915–1977)	20 June 1960	19 November 1968 (deposed)	8 years, 152 days	US–RDA	1964	Keïta	Himself	
2		Moussa Traoré (1936–2020)	19 November 1968	26 March 1991 (deposed)	22 years, 127 days	Military	—	Traoré I	Diakité; Dembelé	
2		Moussa Traoré (1936–2020)	19 November 1968	26 March 1991 (deposed)	22 years, 127 days	Military	1974	Traoré II	Diakité; Dembelé	
2		Moussa Traoré (1936–2020)	19 November 1968	26 March 1991 (deposed)	22 years, 127 days	UDPM	1979	Traoré III	Diakité; Dembelé	
2		Moussa Traoré (1936–2020)	19 November 1968	26 March 1991 (deposed)	22 years, 127 days	UDPM	1985	—N/a	Diakité; Dembelé	
–		Amadou Toumani Touré (1948–2020) acting	26 March 1991	8 June 1992	1 year, 74 days	Military	—	—N/a	Sacko	
3		Alpha Oumar Konaré (born 1946)	8 June 1992	8 June 2002	10 years	ADEMA–PASJ	1992	—N/a	Sacko; Touré; Sow; I. B. Keïta; Mandé Sidibé; Keita	
3		Alpha Oumar Konaré (born 1946)	8 June 1992	8 June 2002	10 years	ADEMA–PASJ	1997	—N/a	Sacko; Touré; Sow; I. B. Keïta; Mandé Sidibé; Keita	
4		Amadou Toumani Touré (1948–2020)	8 June 2002	22 March 2012 (deposed)	9 years, 288 days	Independent (Note: Supported by the Alliance for Democracy in Mali (ADEMA–PASJ) and the Union for the Republic and Democracy (URD) in 2007.)	2002	—N/a	Hamani; O. I. Maïga; Modibo Sidibé; C. M. K. Sidibé	
4		Amadou Toumani Touré (1948–2020)	8 June 2002	22 March 2012 (deposed)	9 years, 288 days	Independent	2007	—N/a	Hamani; O. I. Maïga; Modibo Sidibé; C. M. K. Sidibé	
–		Amadou Sanogo (born 1972/73) acting	22 March 2012	12 April 2012	21 days	Military	—	—N/a	Position vacant	
–		Dioncounda Traoré (born 1942) acting (Note: Simultaneously served as the President of the National Assembly.)	12 April 2012	4 September 2013	1 year, 145 days	ADEMA–PASJ	—	—N/a	Diarra; Sissoko	
5		Ibrahim Boubacar Keïta (1945–2022)	4 September 2013	18 August 2020 (deposed)	6 years, 349 days	RPM	2013	—N/a	Sissoko; Ly; Mara; Keita; A. I. Maïga; S. B. Maïga; Cissé	
5		Ibrahim Boubacar Keïta (1945–2022)	4 September 2013	18 August 2020 (deposed)	6 years, 349 days	RPM	2018	—N/a	Sissoko; Ly; Mara; Keita; A. I. Maïga; S. B. Maïga; Cissé	
–		Assimi Goita (born 1983) acting	18 August 2020	25 September 2020	38 days	Military	—	—N/a	Position vacant	
–		Bah Ndaw (born 1950) acting	25 September 2020	24 May 2021 (deposed)	241 days	Independent	—	—N/a	Ouane	
–		Assimi Goita (born 1983)	24 May 2021	8 July 2025	4 years, 45 days	Military	—	—N/a	C. K. Maïga; A. Maïga	
6		Assimi Goita (born 1983)	8 July 2025	Incumbent	1 year, 137 days	Military	—	—N/a	C. K. Maïga; A. Maïga	

== Latest election ==
Candidate	Party	First round		Second round	
Candidate	Party	Votes	%	Votes	%
Ibrahim Boubacar Keïta	Rally for Mali	1,331,132	41.70	1,791,926	67.16
Soumaïla Cissé	Union for the Republic and Democracy	567,679	17.78	876,124	32.84
Aliou Boubacar Diallo	Democratic Alliance for Peace	256,404	8.03		
Cheick Modibo Diarra	CMD	236,025	7.39		
Housseini Amion Guindo	Convergence for the Development of Mali	124,506	3.90		
Oumar Mariko	African Solidarity for Democracy and Independence	74,300	2.33		
Modibo Kone	Mali Kanu Movement	72,941	2.29		
Choguel Kokalla Maïga	Patriotic Movement for Renewal	68,970	2.16		
Harouna Sankare	Harouna Movement	57,406	1.80		
Mamadou Sidibé	Party for the Restoration of Malian Values	54,274	1.70		
Modibo Sidibé	Alternative Forces for Renewal and Emergence	45,453	1.42		
Kalfa Sanogo	Alliance for Democracy in Mali (unofficial)	38,892	1.22		
Mamadou Igor Diarra		36,124	1.13		
Modibo Kadjoke	Alliance for Mali	30,479	0.95		
lMoussa Sinko Coulibaly	Independent	30,232	0.95		
Adama Kane	Independent	26,084	0.82		
Daba Diawara	Party for Independence, Democracy and Solidarity	22,991	0.72		
Mountaga Tall	National Congress for Democratic Initiative	20,312	0.64		
Dramane Dembélé	Alliance for Democracy in Mali	18,737	0.59		
Mohamed Aly Bathily	Association for Mali	17,712	0.55		
Hamadoun Touré	Independent	17,087	0.54		
Yeah Samake	Party for Civic and Patriotic Action	16,632	0.52		
Mamadou Traore	MIRIA	15,502	0.49		
Madame Djeneba N'diaye	Independent	12,275	0.38		
Total		3,192,149	100.00	2,668,050	100.00
Valid votes		3,192,149	93.44	2,668,050	96.89
Invalid/blank votes		224,069	6.56	85,648	3.11
Total votes		3,416,218	100.00	2,753,698	100.00
Registered voters/turnout		8,000,462	42.70	8,000,462	34.42
Source: Constitutional Court

== See also ==
- Politics of Mali
- Vice President of Mali
- First Lady of Mali
- List of prime ministers of Mali
- List of colonial governors of Mali
