= 2018 Malian presidential election =

← 2013	29 July 2018 (first round); 12 August 2018 (second round)	Next →
- Turnout: 42.70% (first round); 34.42% (second round)
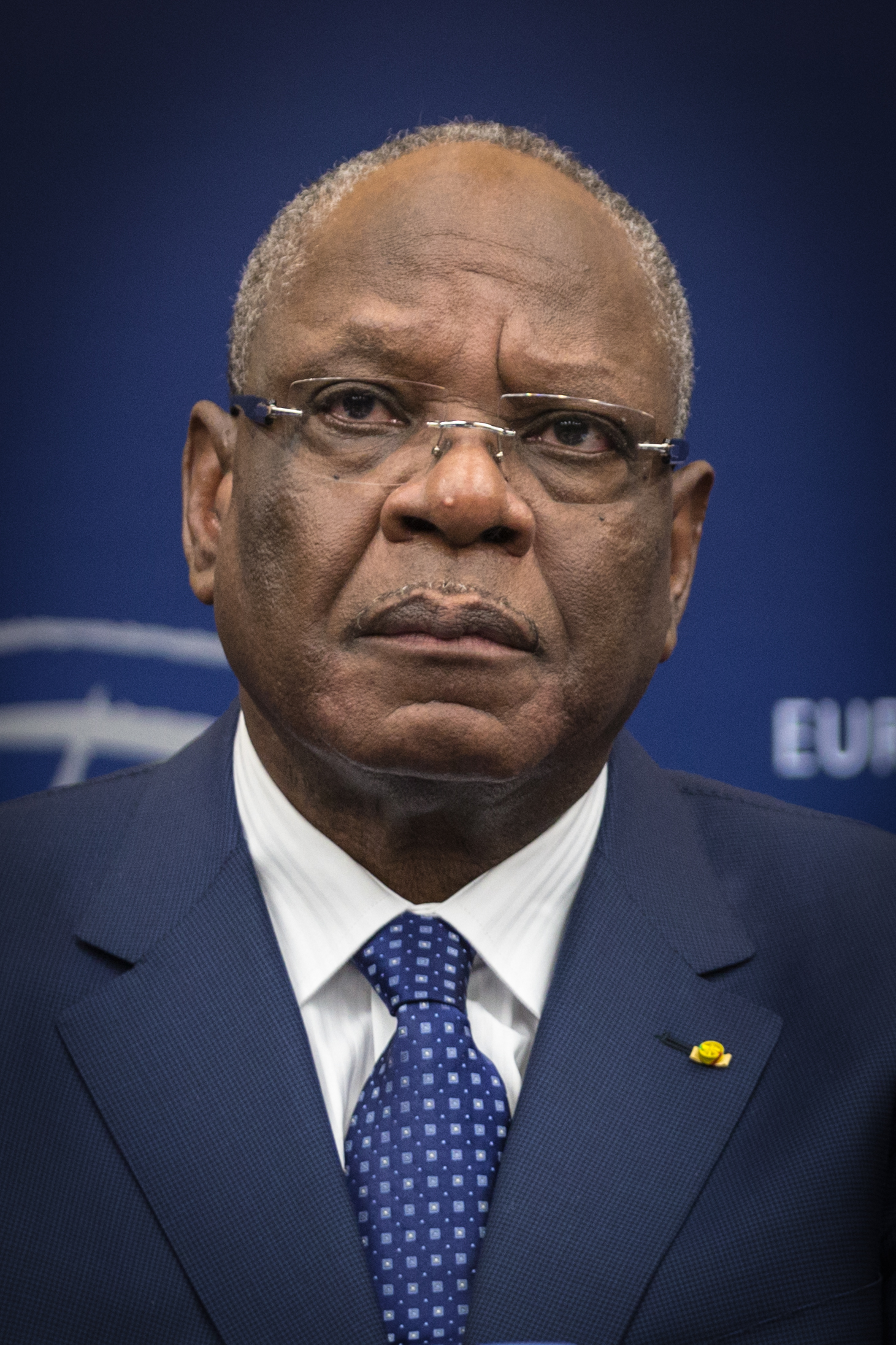

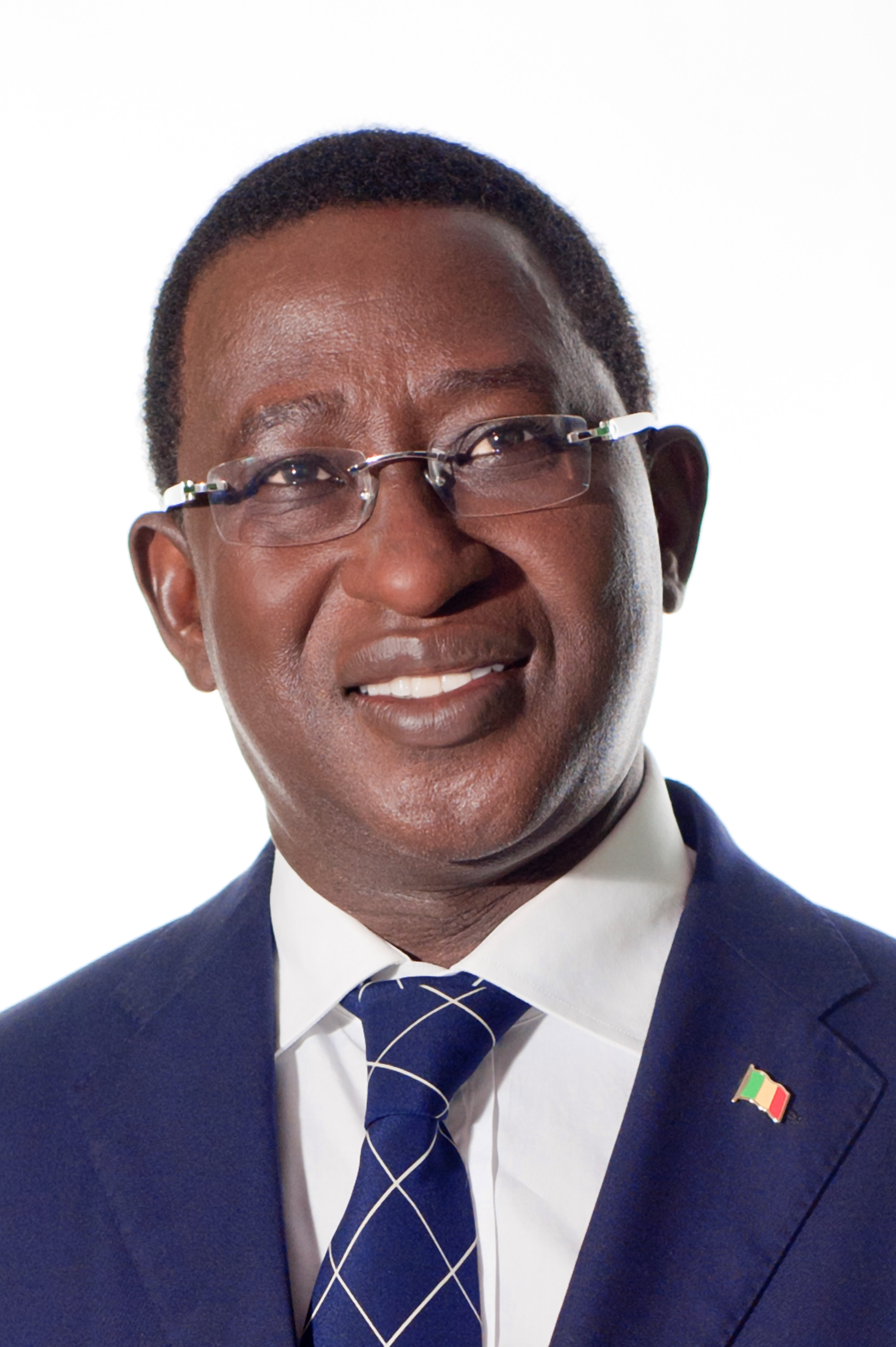
Nominee	Ibrahim Boubacar Keïta	Soumaïla Cissé
Party	RPM	URD
Popular vote	1,791,926	876,124
Percentage	67.16%	32.84%
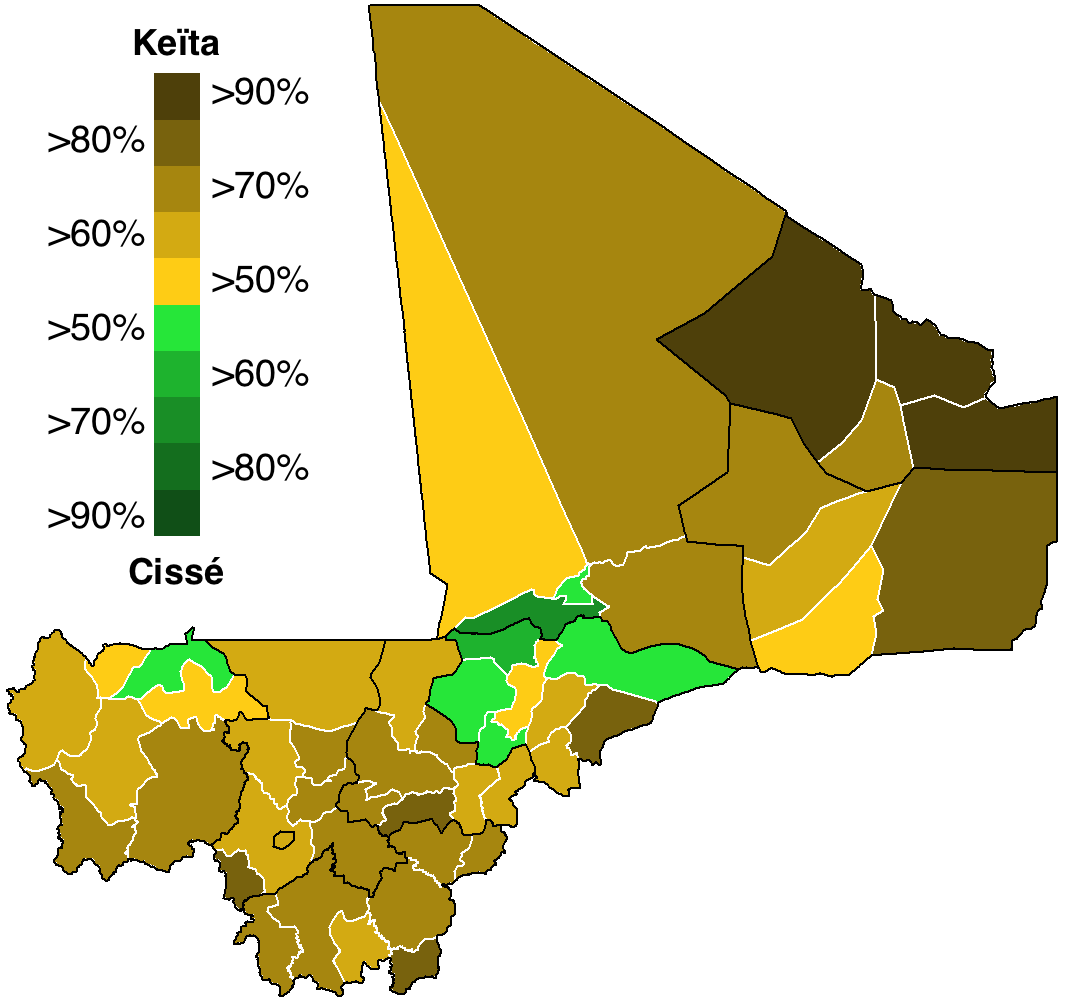
- Results by cercle
President before election
Ibrahim Boubacar Keïta
RPM
President-elect
Ibrahim Boubacar Keïta
RPM

Presidential elections were held in Mali on 29 July 2018. In July 2018, the Constitutional Court approved the nomination of 24 candidates for the election. As no candidate received more than 50% of the vote in the first round, a runoff was held on 12 August 2018 between the top two candidates, incumbent President Ibrahim Boubacar Keïta of the Rally for Mali and Soumaïla Cissé of the Union for the Republic and Democracy. Keïta was subsequently re-elected with 67% of the vote. It was the first time in Malian history that a presidential election was forced into a runoff between an incumbent and a challenger.

== Background ==
In accordance with the 1992 constitution, presidential elections are held every five years. The previous elections, initially scheduled for 13 May 2012, were delayed until 28 July 2013 due to the 2012 coup d'état that overthrew President Amadou Toumani Toure.

A peace deal between Tuareg separatists and the government was signed in 2015 following negotiations through a diplomatic channel extended by the Malian government. The creation of the Macina Liberation Front in 2015, led by the preacher Amadou Koufa, has led to increased ethnic tensions and violence in the country.

There has been little or no violence in Mali's past elections which have in previous years been conducted with no protests.

== Electoral system ==
The President of Mali is elected by absolute majority vote using the two-round system to serve a 5-year term.

== Pre-election ==
There was doubt as to the safety of the elections to be held and of the governments' ability to hold them. If held, the French diplomat Jean-Pierre Lacroix has said that "the upcoming presidential elections will mark the beginning of a new chapter in the stabilization of Mali".

=== Voter registration ===
As of July 24, there were 8,461,000 registered voters set to cast their vote 23,041 polling stations.

Of the Malian refugees living in Mbera, Mauritania, 7,000 people registered to vote in the elections.

=== Candidates ===
There were 17 confirmed candidates and 13 more were pending as of late June. In the end, on July 5, the Constitutional Court approved the nomination of a total of 24 candidates in the election. Some of them include:

Candidate	Party
Ibrahim Boubacar Keïta (incumbent)	Rally for Mali
Mohamed Ali Bathily	
Soumaïla Cissé	
Modibo Kone	
Choguel Kokala Maïga	
Moussa Mara	
Oumar Mariko	African Solidarity for Democracy and Independence
Djeneba N’Diaye	
Yeah Samake	Party for Civic and Patriotic Action
Harouna Sankaré	
Kalifa Sanogo	Alliance for Democracy in Mali
Moussa Sinko Coulibaly	
Cheick Mohamed Abdoulaye Souad	
Hamadoun Toure	
Mountaga Tall	

=== Protests and violence ===
On 6 June, thousands gathered in the capital Bamako to protest against Ibrahim Boubacar Keïta.

On 25 July, following a robbery at a pharmacy, protesters "burned tyres and torched vehicles" in Timbuktu in response to the deepening insecurity and alleged mistreatment by police. This precipitated a violent clash the following day involving about 100 people.

On 31 July, gunmen attacked a convoy carrying election materials in the Ségou Region. This attack and the subsequent shootout killed four soldiers and eight attackers.

== Results ==
Candidate	Party	First round		Second round	
Candidate	Party	Votes	%	Votes	%
Ibrahim Boubacar Keïta	Rally for Mali	1,331,132	41.70	1,791,926	67.16
Soumaïla Cissé	Union for the Republic and Democracy	567,679	17.78	876,124	32.84
Aliou Boubacar Diallo	Democratic Alliance for Peace	256,404	8.03		
Cheick Modibo Diarra	CMD	236,025	7.39		
Housseini Amion Guindo	Convergence for the Development of Mali	124,506	3.90		
Oumar Mariko	African Solidarity for Democracy and Independence	74,300	2.33		
Modibo Kone	Mali Kanu Movement	72,941	2.29		
Choguel Kokalla Maïga	Patriotic Movement for Renewal	68,970	2.16		
Harouna Sankare	Harouna Movement	57,406	1.80		
Mamadou Sidibé	Party for the Restoration of Malian Values	54,274	1.70		
Modibo Sidibé	Alternative Forces for Renewal and Emergence	45,453	1.42		
Kalfa Sanogo	Alliance for Democracy in Mali (unofficial)	38,892	1.22		
Mamadou Igor Diarra		36,124	1.13		
Modibo Kadjoke	Alliance for Mali	30,479	0.95		
lMoussa Sinko Coulibaly	Independent	30,232	0.95		
Adama Kane	Independent	26,084	0.82		
Daba Diawara	Party for Independence, Democracy and Solidarity	22,991	0.72		
Mountaga Tall	National Congress for Democratic Initiative	20,312	0.64		
Dramane Dembélé	Alliance for Democracy in Mali	18,737	0.59		
Mohamed Aly Bathily	Association for Mali	17,712	0.55		
Hamadoun Touré	Independent	17,087	0.54		
Yeah Samake	Party for Civic and Patriotic Action	16,632	0.52		
Mamadou Traore	MIRIA	15,502	0.49		
Madame Djeneba N'diaye	Independent	12,275	0.38		
Total		3,192,149	100.00	2,668,050	100.00
Valid votes		3,192,149	93.44	2,668,050	96.89
Invalid/blank votes		224,069	6.56	85,648	3.11
Total votes		3,416,218	100.00	2,753,698	100.00
Registered voters/turnout		8,000,462	42.70	8,000,462	34.42
Source: Constitutional Court
