= Moussa Timbiné =

Malian politician (born 1974)

President of the National Assembly of Mali
- In office 11 May 2020 – 18 August 2020
- Preceded by: Issaka Sidibé
- Succeeded by: Vacant

Member of the National Assembly
- In office 2013 – 18 August 2020
- Constituency: Commune V, Bamako

Personal details
- Born: 14 July 1974 (age 52) Bandiagara, Mali
- Party: Rally for Mali (until 2023), Convergence (since 2023)

Moussa Timbiné (born 14 July 1974) is a Malian politician representing Rally for Mali. He became President of the National Assembly of Mali on 11 May 2020 but was deposed on 18 August 2020 during the 2020 Malian coup d'état. He had been a member of the National Assembly since 2013.

== Early life ==
Timbiné was born on 14 July 1974 in Bandiagara. His father is of Dogon background and his mother of Songhai descent. Timbiné obtained a bachelor in exact sciences at the Lycée Hamadoun Dicko de Sévaré. He attended business schools in Sousse, Tunisia and Toulon, France. Lastly, he studied maths and physics at the University of Bamako. Timbiné subsequently worked as a teacher in the Daoudabougou neighborhood of Bamako. He later worked in financial and administrative positions for the Deutsche Gesellschaft für Technische Zusammenarbeit.

== Political career ==
Timbiné was one of the founding members of Rally for Mali (RPM). In 2004 he became its youth president, a position which he has held since. The same year he became a member of the municipal council of Bamako for Commune V. Timbiné has also served as deputy mayor of Commune V.

In the 2013 Malian parliamentary election he was elected to the National Assembly of Mali for Commune V. He served as First Vice President of the National Assembly since 2017. In the 2020 Malian parliamentary election Timbiné seemed to not win his Bamako seat (Commune V) after the second round of votes was counted. However, this result was overturned by the Constitutional Court of Mali, with Timbiné thus winning the seat.

On 11 May 2020 he was elected President of the National Assembly for a five-year term. He won the election with 134 votes, over 8 votes for his opponent, former Prime Minister Moussa Mara. Fellow RPM assembly-member Mamadou Diarrassouba had also been designated candidate for the Presidency by the RPM, but he withdrew his candidacy on the day of the vote. Timbiné is considered to be a close ally of President Ibrahim Boubacar Keïta.

On 18 August 2020 Timbiné was deposed and detained during the 2020 Malian coup d'état. On 18 September both Timbiné as well as Prime Minister Boubou Cissé were reported to still be in custody of the National Committee for the Salvation of the People in Kati. On 8 October he was reportedly released.

After the events in 2020 Timbiné kept a low-profile. He managed to gain a number of followers but did not win out over Rally for Mali President Bocary Tréta. Timbiné resigned from the political party in January 2023. In March 2023 he launched his own political party, Convergence.

== Personal life ==
Timbiné is married and has four children.
