= Sy Kadiatou Sow =

Malian politician

Minister of Foreign Affairs
- In office February 1994 – October 1994

Minister of Urban Planning and Housing
- In office October 1994 – February 2000

Personal details
- Born: 7 March 1955 (age 71) Nioro du Sahel, Mali
- Education: Paris Nanterre University

Sy Kadiatou Sow (born 7 March 1955) is a Malian politician who served as Minister of Foreign Affairs in 1994 and was the first female governor in Mali.

== Early life and education ==
Kadiatou Sow was born on 7 March 1955 in Nioro du Sahel. She has a master's degree in modern literature and a degree in public law from the Paris Nanterre University (1978).

== Career ==
From 1982 until 1990, Kadiatou Sow worked at the Malian Textile Company as a human resources manager. She was a founding member of the African Party for Solidarity and Justice and appointed to the executive committee in 2000. In 2002, she was campaign director for Soumaïla Cissé in the presidential election.

Kadiatou Sow was appointed governor of Bamako district in April 1993, the first woman to hold the position in Mali. In February 1994, she was appointed Minister of Foreign Affairs, Foreign Malians and African Integration. In October 1994, she was appointed Minister of Urban Planning and Habitat, serving in this role until February 2000. She oversaw policies including the creation of the Mali Housing Bank, the Malian Housing Authority and other professional associations.

From 2001 until 2006, Kadiatou Sow was Director of the Community Development Support Project, a poverty reduction project financed by the African Development Bank and the Mali government. Since February 2009, she has been the president of the Alliance for Democracy in Mali.

Kadiatou Sow has been active in women's associations and served as president of the women's collective of Mail from 1991 to 2000 and as a member of the network of African women ministers and parliamentarians.

== Personal life ==
Kadiatou Sow is married to Malian politician Ousmane Sy.
