= Issaka Sidibé =

Malian politician (born 1946)

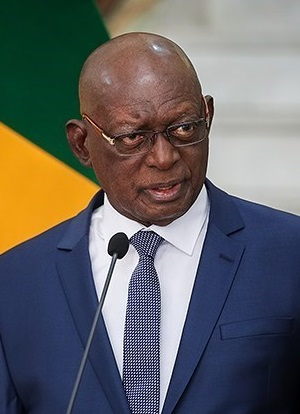

President of the National Assembly of Mali
- In office 22 January 2014 – 11 May 2020
- Preceded by: Younoussi Touré
- Succeeded by: Moussa Timbiné

Member of the National Assembly
- Incumbent
- Assumed office 2013
- In office 2002–2007

Personal details
- Born: 26 June 1946 (age 80) Koulikoro, Mali
- Party: Rally for Mali

Issaka Sidibé (born 26 June 1946) is a Malian politician. Since 11 June 2020 he has been President of the High Court of Justice. He was President of the National Assembly of Mali between 22 January 2014 and 11 May 2020. Sidibé previously served in the National Assembly from 2002 to 2007, and he was reelected in 2013. He had a career as a customs official before his turn to politics.

== Career ==
Sidibé was born on 26 June 1946 in Koulikoro. He obtained a degree in private law from the l’Ecole nationale d’administration de Bamako. Sidibé had a career in the customs authority of Mali between 1976 and 2002. In the 2002 parliamentary elections he was elected for the first time to the National Assembly. He served a single five-year term. Sidibé was the general rapporteur for the finance commission during his time in office.

He was re-elected to the National Assembly in the November–December 2013 parliamentary election as a Rally for Mali candidate. On 22 January 2014 Sidibé was elected as President of the National Assembly. He won 115 of the 147 possible votes. Despite his previous stint in the National Assembly, he was considered a little-known figure in Malian politics at the time, particularly in comparison with the prominence of past holders of the post. On 11 May 2020 he was succeeded as President of the National Assembly by Moussa Timbiné.

On 11 June 2020 he was sworn in as President of the High Court of Justice. He succeeded Abderrahmane Niang.

== Personal life ==
Sidibé is married and father of five children. He is the father-in-law of Karim Keïta, son of former Malian President Ibrahim Boubacar Keïta.
