= Dramane Dembélé =

Malian politician

Dramane Dembélé is a Malian politician, who served in the government of Mali as Minister of Urban Planning and Housing from 2015 to 2016. A mining engineer by profession, he was Director-General of Geology and Mines from 2005 to 2010. He was the candidate of the Alliance for Democracy in Mali (Adéma-PASJ) for the July 2013 presidential election.

== Career ==
Dembélé became a member of Adéma-PASJ's executive committee in 2004, and he served as Director-General of Geology and Mines from 2005 to 2010. On 10 April 2013, he was designated as Adéma-PASJ's candidate for the July 2013 presidential election. Party leader Dioncounda Traoré was Adéma-PASJ's original candidate for the vote when it was first scheduled to be held, in 2012, but in the wake of the March 2012 coup d'état he was allowed by the ruling junta to take up the post of interim President, and he consequently agreed not to stand as a presidential candidate.

Dembélé placed third in the election, receiving 9.6% of the vote. On 3 August 2013, he announced his support for Ibrahim Boubacar Keita in the second round, saying that "we are in the Socialist International, we share the same values". However, in endorsing Keita he contradicted the official stance of Adéma-PASJ, which had backed Keita's rival, Soumaïla Cissé, on the previous day. The party stressed that Dembélé was speaking only for himself and that the party still supported Cissé.

Under President Keita, Dembélé was appointed to the government as Minister of Urban Planning and Housing on 10 January 2015. He was dismissed from the government on 7 July 2016.
