= International University Cheick Modibo Diarra =

- Université Internationale Cheick Modibo Diarra
- Type: Private university
- Established: August 27, 2007
- President: Mamadou Saliou Kaltamba
- Rector: Djibril Kassomba Camara
- Location: Conakry, Guinea; 9.6157°N 13.6338°W
- Language: French

The International University Cheick Modibo Diarra is a private university in West Africa located in Conakry.

The university is named in honor of Cheick Modibo Diarra, a Malian astrophysicist and statesman.

== History and mission ==
The International University Cheick Modibo Diarra, endowed with legal personality and financial autonomy, was established in August 2007 with the mission to:

- Provide higher education;
- Offer general and professional higher education;
- Promote scientific research;
- Promote new information and communication technologies.

== Presidents ==
- Mamadou Saliou Kaltamba

== Organization ==
The International University Cheick Modibo Diarra comprises the following faculties:

- Department of Economic and Management Sciences
- Department of Law (Legal and Political Sciences)
- Department of Computer Science and ICT
- Department of Journalism and Communication
- Department of Languages
- Department of Social Sciences
- Department of Applied and Technical Sciences
- Department of Political Sciences
- Department of Sports and Cultural Management
- Institute of Professional Training
- Master's and DESS programs
