= Yamoussa Camara =

Yamoussa Camara may refer to:

- Yamoussa Camara (politician)
- Yamoussa Camara (footballer)
