= Amadou Sanogo =

Malian military officer, Head of state in 2012

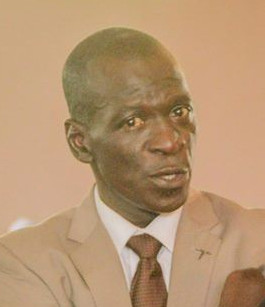

Chairman of the National Committee for the Restoration of Democracy and State of Mali
- De facto
- In office 22 March 2012 – 12 April 2012
- Deputy: Seyba Traoré
- Preceded by: Amadou Toumani Touré (President)
- Succeeded by: Dioncounda Traoré (Acting President)

Personal details
- Born: 1972 or 1973 (52 age or 53 age) Mali
- Party: National Committee for Recovering Democracy and Restoring the State

Amadou Haya Sanogo (born 1972 or 1973) is a Malian military officer who was leader of the 2012 Malian coup d'état against President Amadou Toumani Touré. He proclaimed himself the leader of the National Committee for Recovering Democracy and Restoring the State (CNRDRE). Sanogo was also said to be involved in the arrest and resignation of acting Prime Minister Cheick Modibo Diarra in December 2012, leading to the appointment of civil servant Django Sissoko as Prime Minister. According to Human Rights Watch, Sanogo’s forces were implicated in serious human rights abuses including torture, sexual abuse, and intimidation against journalists and family members of detained soldiers.

== Early and personal life ==
Sanogo is one of six children born to Mamadou Sanogo and his wife. Amadou Sanogo is nicknamed "Bolly" by relatives.

Sanogo comes from Ségou, one of Mali's largest cities on the Niger River. Sanogo has spent 22 years in the Malian Armed Forces. Before the coup, Sanogo had held a mid-level army position. A participant in the International Military Education and Training program, he received training "at training programmes in the United States, in Georgia and at the Marine Corps Base Quantico in Virginia", but his American instructors "never marked him out as future leadership material". He also studied English language at Lackland Air Force Base in Texas.

== CRNDRE ==
His first actions as de facto head of state included suspending the constitution and activities of some organizations, as well as declaring a curfew and closing the borders. Though the rationale for the coup had been Amadou Toumani Touré's alleged mismanagement of the 2012 Tuareg rebellion, the Malian military lost control of the regional capitals of Kidal, Gao, and Timbuktu within ten days of Sanogo's assuming office, leading Reuters to describe the coup as "a spectacular own-goal". On 4 April, The New York Times reported that he was trying to deflect attention from the coup to the struggles in the north, telling a reporter, "We should forget a little the Committee, the Parliament, the Constitution — that can wait. The serious topic, it’s the north. That’s the most important."

Following the economic sanctions and a blockade by the Economic Community of West African States (ECOWAS) on the country, a deal, brokered in Burkina Faso by President Blaise Compaoré under the auspices of ECOWAS, was signed that would see Sanogo cede power to Dioncounda Traoré, who would assume the presidency in an interim capacity until an election could be held.

After the new interim President Dioncounda Traoré and Prime Minister Cheick Modibo Diarra took office, the junta led by Sanogo made it clear that they were stepping aside only temporarily and that the junta would retain a supervisory role until the elections. ECOWAS gave the interim government one year to hold elections.

On 24 November 2012, Sanogo joined Malian religious leaders to speak at a Bamako rally against religious extremism.

On 11 December 2012, Prime Minister Modibo Diarra was arrested by Sanogo's junta and forced to resign. The move, which was condemned by ECOWAS, was followed the same day by the appointment of Django Sissoko as Prime Minister.

== Arrest and release pending trial ==
Following the election of Ibrahim Boubacar Keita as President, Sanogo was promoted to the rank of four-star general on 14 August 2013; it was believed that the move was part of an effort to convince Sanogo to retire, enabling him to do so with dignity. Shortly before Keita was sworn in as President, Sanogo was dismissed from his post as head of a military reform committee on 28 August 2013.

On 27 November 2013, Sanogo was arrested and charged with complicity in the kidnapping and disappearance of rivals within the Malian military. He remains in detention while awaiting trial.

In January 2020, it was announced that Sanogo would be released pending his upcoming trial. This was in accordance with a court decision ordering Sanogo's release after Sanogo's trial date was postponed at the last minute.

Political offices
Preceded by Amadou Toumani Touré as President of Mali	Chairman of the National Committee for the Restoration of Democracy and State of Mali; 2012	Succeeded by Dioncounda Traoré as Acting President of Mali
