= Alwata Ichata Sahi =

Alwata Ichata Sahi (born March 27, 1961) is a Malian politician.

== Life and career ==
Sahi was born on March 27, 1961 in Gao.

A teacher by training, with a degree in philosophy and a master's degree in English, Alwata Ichata Sahi has served as chief of staff of the Ministry of Housing, Land Affairs and Urban Planning. Alwata Ichata Sahi was appointed Minister of the Family and the Promotion of Women and Children on the 25th in the Government of Cheick Modibo Diarra. She was reappointed to this position in the national unity government of Cheick Modibo Diarra on his next term.

In 2013, leading up to Mali's general election in July, Alwata Ichata Sahi launched a campaign to facilitate the inclusion of women in the electoral process. Promoted by the slogan "Woman: It is Your Primary Right to Vote", the campaign was supported by UN Women. It started in two of Mali's regions before spreading to the rest of the country, involving more than 5000 women and young people.

Alwata Ichata Sahi represented her government in 2013 to receive female genital mutilation complications kits from United Nations Population Fund (UNFPA) to support affected girls in Mali following the armed rebellion in the north of the country that started in 2012.
