= Abdoulaye Sékou Sow =

Malian politician

5th Prime Minister of Mali
- In office 12 April 1993 – 4 February 1994
- President: Alpha Oumar Konaré
- Preceded by: Younoussi Touré
- Succeeded by: Ibrahim Boubacar Keïta

Personal details
- Born: 1937 Bamako, French Sudan (now Mali)
- Died: 27 May 2013 (aged 75–76) Bamako, Mali
- Party: Adéma-PASJ
- Occupation: Politician

Abdoulaye Sékou Sow (1931 – 27 May 2013) was a Malipolitician who served as Prime Minister of Mali from 12 April 1993 to 4 February 1994 under President Alpha Oumar Konaré.

== Career ==
Sow was director of the École Nationale d'Administration. He was a founding member of the Alliance for Democracy in Mali-African Party for Solidarity and Justice (ADEMA-Pasj). President Konaré appointed him as Minister of Defense and Prime Minister in 1993. He held this post from April 1993 to February 1994.

In 2008, he published "The State Democratic Republican: the problem of its construction in Mali", edited by Grandvaux raising controversy in Mali in the management of revolts of 1993.

Sow died in Bamako on 27 May 2013.

Political offices
Preceded by Younoussi Touré	Prime Minister of Mali; 1993 – 1994	Succeeded by Ibrahim Boubacar Keïta
