= Karim Keïta =

Malian politician & businessman (born 1979)

Member of the National Assembly
- Incumbent
- Assumed office 2013
- Constituency: Bamako II

Personal details
- Born: 1979 (age 46–47) Paris, France
- Party: Rally for Mali
- Parent: Ibrahim Boubacar Keïta (father)
- Relatives: Issaka Sidibé (father-in-law)

Karim Keïta (born 1979) is a Malian politician and businessman. He is a member of the National Assembly since 2013. Keïta is the son of former Malian President Ibrahim Boubacar Keïta.

== Career ==
Karim Keïta was born in 1979 in Paris, France, to Ibrahim Boubacar Keïta and Aminata Maïga. He studied in Belgium and Canada. After his return to Mali in 2006 he set up two companies, a rental car business and an investment advice firm.

Keïta entered politics and was elected to the National Assembly as a candidate of the Rally for Mali for Bamako II in the second round of the November–December 2013 parliamentary election. After his election he became Chairman of the Security and Defence Commission of the National Assembly. Keïta was re-elected during the 2020 Malian parliamentary election and obtained nearly 62% of the votes.

On 13 July 2020 as a response to criticism directed at him during the 2020 Malian protests Keïta resigned as chairperson of the parliamentary defence committee. During the 2020 Malian coup d'état Keïta's house was reported to have been looted. He evaded arrest and was reported to have fled Mali to a neighboring country by late August.

Keïta is married to a daughter of Issaka Sidibé, former President of the National Assembly.

On December 9, 2022, the US Treasury published a list of more than forty personalities targeted by sanctions for acts of corruption and human rights violations. Among the targets of the Office of Foreign Assets Control (OFAC), the financial control body of the Treasury Department is Karim Keïta..
