= Younoussi Touré =

4th Prime Minister of Mali (1941–2022)

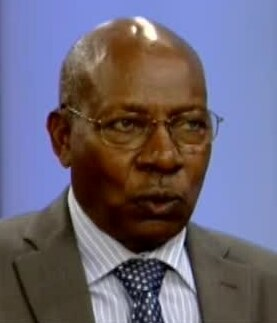
- Touré in 2013

4th Prime Minister of Mali
- In office 9 June 1992 – 12 April 1993
- President: Alpha Oumar Konaré
- Preceded by: Soumana Sacko (acting)
- Succeeded by: Abdoulaye Sekou Sow

President of the National Assembly
- In office 2012–2013
- Preceded by: Dioncounda Traoré
- Succeeded by: Issaka Sidibé

Personal details
- Born: 27 December 1941; Niodougou, Niafunké Cercle, French Sudan (now Mali)
- Died: 17 October 2022 (aged 80); Paris, France
- Political party: URD
- Occupation: Politician

Younoussi Touré (27 December 1941 – 17 October 2022) was a Malian politician. He was Prime Minister of Mali from 9 June 1992 to 12 April 1993 and was the first prime minister appointed under President Alpha Oumar Konaré. Touré was the president of the Union for the Republic and Democracy (URD), a political party, from 2003 to 2014. He was First Vice-President of the National Assembly from 2007 to 2012 and President of the National Assembly from 2012 to 2013.

== Early life and career ==
Touré was born in Niodougou, Niafunké Cercle, French Sudan, on 27 December 1941. He attended primary and secondary school in Niafunké, Sudanese Crafts School, Sévaré Normal School, Katibougou Normal School and at the Askia Mohamed High School, before going to the University of Dakar and the Technical School of the Bank of France.

Touré held a post-graduate degree in Economics and worked at the Central Bank of Mali where he was the general manager before becoming special adviser to the Governor of the Central Bank of West Africa (BCEAO).

== Political career ==
Touré served as prime minister for nearly a year. Konaré accepted the resignation of his government on 9 April 1993 and appointed Abdoulaye Sekou Sow to succeed him on 12 April.

Touré was appointed one of six members of the Commission of the West African Economic and Monetary Union (UEMOA) on 30 January 1995. When the Union for the Republic and Democracy (URD) political party was founded in June 2003, Touré was elected as its president.

In the July 2007 parliamentary election, he was elected to the National Assembly on a URD list in Niafunké District; the list won 50.16% of the district's vote, making Touré one of thirteen candidates across the country to be elected in the first round. He was elected as First Vice-President of the National Assembly in September 2007.

Following the March 2012 coup, Dioncounda Traoré, the President of the National Assembly, took office as interim President of Mali in April 2012. Consequently, the post of President of the National Assembly was considered vacant, and Touré, as First Vice-President of the National Assembly, succeeded him in that post. The move to declare the post vacant and designate a successor was referred to the Constitutional Court for confirmation, and the court gave its approval on 8 June 2012. He continued presiding over the National Assembly through the November 2013 parliamentary election, in which he did not stand for re-election.

At the URD's Third Ordinary Congress in November 2014, Soumaïla Cissé succeeded Younoussi Touré as President of the URD. Touré was instead designated as Honorary President.

== Personal life and death ==
Touré died in Paris, France on 17 October 2022, at age 80.

Political offices
Preceded by Soumana Sacko	Prime Minister of Mali; 1992–1993	Succeeded by Abdoulaye Sékou Sow
