= Koulouba Palace =

Official residence of the President of the Republic of Mali

The Koulouba Palace is the official residence and work place of the President of the Republic of Mali, located in Bamako.

It was built between 1903 and 1907. It was originally built to house the governor of French Sudan at the time, after independence in 1960, the palace officially became the seat of the president of the Republic of Mali.
