= Mahamane Haidara =

Malian politician

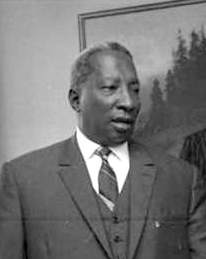
Mahamane Alassane Haidara

Mahamane Alassane Haidara (born 1 January 1910 in Tombouctou, Mali; died 17 October 1981 in Tombouctou) was a politician from Mali who was elected to the French Senate in 1948.

He was the President of the National Assembly from 1961 to 1967.
