= 1974 Malian constitutional referendum =

- 2 June 1974

Results
| Choice | Votes | % |
|---|---|---|
| Yes | 2,665,531 | 99.66% |
| No | 8,989 | 0.34% |
| Valid votes | 2,674,520 | 99.86% |
| Invalid or blank votes | 3,625 | 0.14% |
| Total votes | 2,678,145 | 100.00% |
| Registered voters/turnout | 2,904,292 | 92.21% |

A constitutional referendum was held in Mali on 2 June 1974, following the 1968 military coup. The new constitution would allow for a directly elected president (previously the post had been elected by the National Assembly) who would serve five-year terms, together with a unicameral National Assembly. It also proposed that the country be run for the next five years by the Military Committee for National Liberation.

The new constitution was reportedly approved by 99.66% of voters with a 92% turnout.

== Results ==
| Choice | Votes | % |
|---|---|---|
| For | 2,665,531 | 99.66 |
| Against | 8,989 | 0.34 |
| Total | 2,674,520 | 100.00 |
| Valid votes | 2,674,520 | 99.86 |
| Invalid/blank votes | 3,625 | 0.14 |
| Total votes | 2,678,145 | 100.00 |
| Registered voters/turnout | 2,904,292 | 92.21 |
Source: Sternberger et al.
