= Daba Diawara =

Malian politician

Daba Diawara (born August 15, 1951) is a Malian politician.

Daba Diawara was born in Bamako, son of Gabou Diawara, a former minister and political ally of the first president, Modibo Keïta. He pursued his education in public law in Dakar and in Paris, where he received a doctorate at the University of Paris in 1987.

After graduating, Diawara was a civil administrator of public services. From October 1988 to January 1991, he worked as General Secretary of the Government.

After the fall of Moussa Traoré's regime, he was named Minister of Public Services on April 5, 1991. In June 1992, he again became General Secretary of the Government.

Soon, Daba Diawara began to campaign with the Sudanese Union/African Democratic Rally (Union Soudanaise-Rassemblement Démocratique Africain, US-RDA), and in 1996 was elected Political Secretary of the National Political Office. In 1998, the US-RDA split between two factions.

In September 2001, Diawara founded the Party for Independence, Democracy and Solidarity (PIDS), and ran as its candidate in the 2002 presidential election. In the first round, held in April, he received 1.10% of the vote, placing 11th.

Daba Diawara has worked as an expert at the Centre d'Analyse et de Formulation de Politiques de Développement (CAFPD). As of 2007 he is the Secretary-General of the Ministry of Health.

In early 2008, President Amadou Toumani Touré appointed Diawara to head a 15-member committee that was tasked with reviewing Mali's political system and determining ways that it could be improved.
