= Dioncounda Traoré =

Malian politician, President from 2012 to 2013

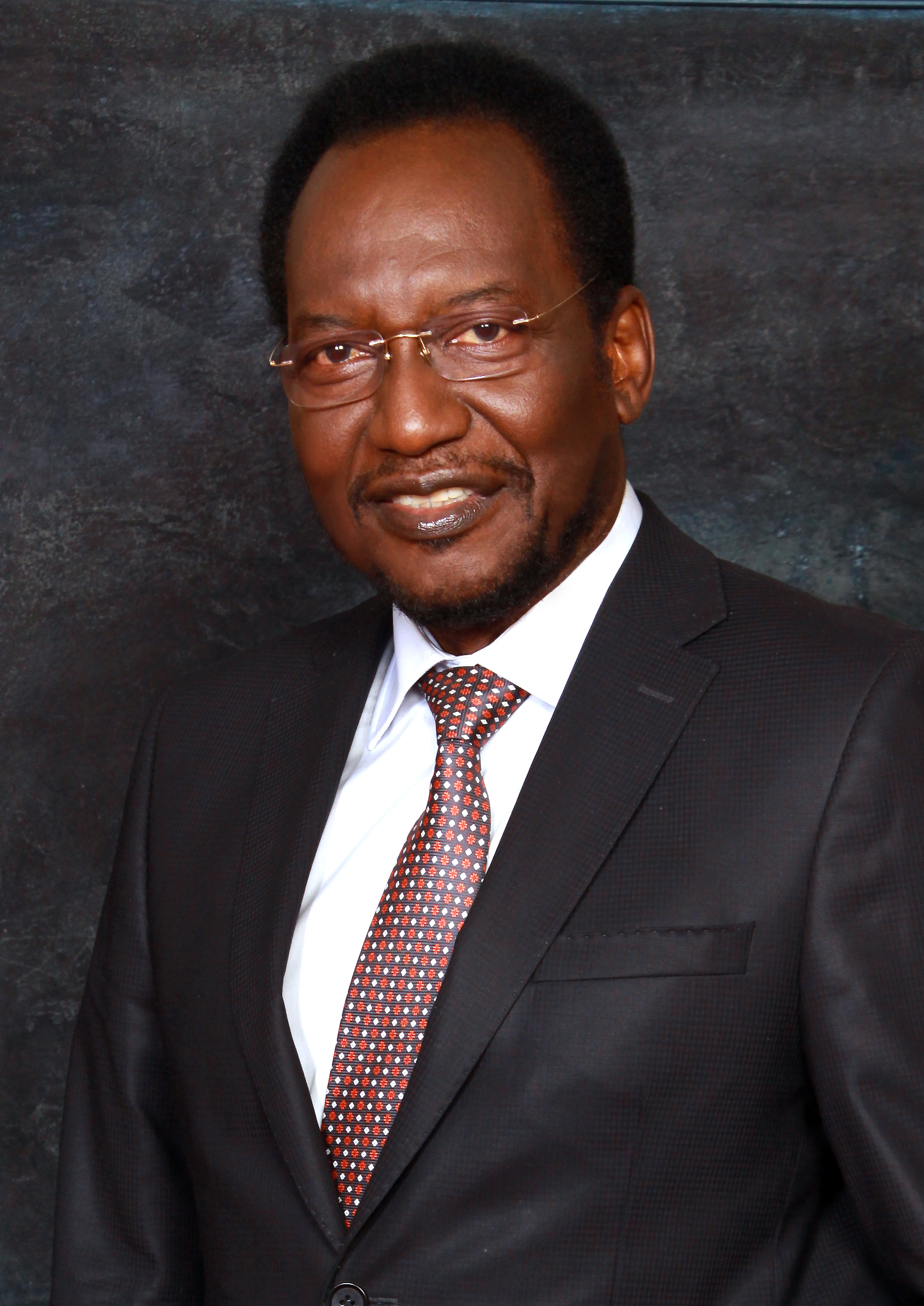
- Traoré in 2012

President of Mali
- Acting
- In office 12 April 2012 – 4 September 2013
- Prime Minister: Cheick Modibo Diarra (acting); Django Sissoko (acting)
- Preceded by: Amadou Sanogo (Chairperson)
- Succeeded by: Ibrahim Boubacar Keïta

President of the National Assembly
- In office 3 September 2007 – 12 April 2012
- Preceded by: Ibrahim Boubacar Keïta
- Succeeded by: Younoussi Touré

Minister for Foreign Affairs
- In office 25 October 1994 – 24 August 1997
- Prime Minister: Ibrahim Boubacar Keïta
- Preceded by: Sy Kadiatou Sow
- Succeeded by: Modibo Sidibé

Personal details
- Born: 23 February 1942 (age 84) Kati, French Sudan (now Mali)
- Party: Alliance for Democracy in Mali
- Spouse: Traore Mintou Doucoure
- Education: University of Algiers; University of Nice

Dioncounda Traoré (born 23 February 1942) is a Malian politician who was President of Mali in an interim capacity from April 2012 to September 2013. Previously he was President of the National Assembly of Mali from 2007 to 2012, and he served as Minister of Foreign Affairs from 1994 to 1997. He was President of the Alliance for Democracy in Mali-African Party for Solidarity and Justice (ADEMA-PASJ) beginning in 2000, and he was also President of the Alliance for Democracy and Progress (ADP), an alliance of parties that supported the re-election of President Amadou Toumani Touré in 2007.

== Political career ==
Traoré was born in Kati. After studying abroad in the Soviet Union, at the University of Algiers, and at the University of Nice, he taught in Mali at the Teachers' College (ENSUP) from 1977 to 1980. He was then arrested for trade union activities and sent to Ménaka in northern Mali. Subsequently, he became director-general of the National School of Engineering. He participated in the struggle for democracy that culminated with the overthrow of President Moussa Traoré in March 1991. He was a founding member of ADEMA, and at its constitutive congress, held on 25–26 May 1991, he was elected as its second vice-president, while Alpha Oumar Konaré was elected as the party's president and Mamadou Lamine Traoré was elected as its first vice-president.

After Konaré was elected as President of Mali in the 1992 presidential election, Traoré was appointed Minister of the Civil Service, Labor, and the Modernization of Administration on 9 June 1992, in the first government under Konaré's presidency. He was then named Minister of State for Defense on 16 April 1993, holding that position until he became Minister of State for Foreign Affairs on 25 October 1994. At ADEMA's first ordinary congress, held in September 1994, Traoré was elected as the First Vice-President of the party, while Ibrahim Boubacar Keïta was elected as its president.

He was elected to the National Assembly as a Deputy from Nara in 1997 and resigned as Minister of State for Foreign Affairs on 24 August 1997 to take his seat. In the National Assembly, he became President of the ADEMA Parliamentary Group and following the resignation of Keïta as ADEMA President in October 2000, Traoré was elected as ADEMA President at the party's first extraordinary congress, held on 25–28 November 2000. In the 2002 parliamentary election, he was defeated in Nara and lost his seat.

In the July 2007 parliamentary election, Traoré ran again at the head of an ADEMA list in Nara, where three seats were at stake. In the first round, his list won 39.59% of the vote, and in the second round it prevailed with 58.41% of the vote. When the new National Assembly held its first meeting on 3 September 2007, Traoré was elected as President of the National Assembly, receiving 111 votes against 31 for Mountaga Tall of the National Congress for Democratic Initiative (CNID), another member of the ADP.

=== 2012 coup and interim presidency ===
Following the March 2012 military coup, which precipitated economic sanctions and a blockade by the Economic Community of West African States (ECOWAS) against Mali, a deal, brokered in Burkina Faso by President Blaise Compaoré under the auspices of ECOWAS, was signed on 6 April 2012 that would see the head of the military junta, Captain Amadou Sanogo, cede power to Dioncounda Traoré to assume the presidency in an interim capacity until an election could be held. Traoré had left the country following the coup, but returned on 7 April.

Traoré was sworn in as president at a ceremony on 12 April 2012. He pledged to "wage a total and relentless war" on the Tuareg rebellion in Mali's north unless it relinquished its control of northern Malian cities and its declared state of Azawad.

On 13 August 2012, he reappointed Cheick Modibo Diarra as prime minister, giving Diarra three days to form a unity government. Traoré was eventually succeeded as president by Ibrahim Boubacar Keita on 4 September 2013, after the latter prevailed in the July–August 2013 presidential election.

On 21 May 2012, soldiers allowed a group of pro-coup demonstrators into Traoré's office in Bamako. The demonstrators, who had been carrying a mock coffin with Traoré's name written on it, fought past two Red Beret guards to attack him. When one of the guards put a helmet on Traoré's head to protect him, a member of the crowd removed it and used it to beat Traoré. Other members of the crowd punched and kicked him. Traoré was then stripped naked, with members of the crowd carrying away pieces of his clothing. Jeune Afrique reported that members of the crowd shouted triumphantly that he was dead.

He was brought to Point G Hospital but was not conscious, apparently suffering from a head injury. Three protesters were killed and others wounded when Traoré's security fired on the attackers. After an examination showed no serious injury, Traoré was taken to a secure location. PM Cheick Modibo Diarra called for calm and an end to protest marches, stating that the attack was "not worthy of our country". On 23 May, it was announced that Traoré would travel to France for further health checks, reportedly including an examination of his pacemaker. He remained there for two months, returning on 27 July.

On 5 June 2012, coup supporters Boubacar Bore, Yacouba Niare and Mamadou Sangare were arrested in connection with the attack. A video of the attack was posted by Jeune Afrique on 29 June.

After leaving office in 2013, Traoré headed the African Union's observer mission for the April 2016 presidential election in Chad. He gave the vote a positive assessment, although he noted that there were irregularities.

Political offices
Preceded by Sy Kadiatou Sow	Minister of Foreign Affairs; 1994–1997	Succeeded by Modibo Sidibé
Preceded by Ibrahim Boubacar Keïta	President of the National Assembly; 2007–2012	Succeeded by Younoussi Touré
Preceded by Amadou Sanogo as Chairperson of the National Committee for the Restoration of Democracy and State of Mali	President of Mali; Acting; 2012–2013	Succeeded by Ibrahim Boubacar Keïta
