= Party for Independence, Democracy and Solidarity =

Political party in Mali

The Party for Independence, Democracy and Solidarity (French: Parti pour l’Indépendance de la Démocratie et de la Solidarité, PIDS) is a political party in Mali.

== History ==
The party was formed on 2 September 2001 as a breakaway from the Sudanese Union – African Democratic Rally. Led by Daba Diawara, it was officially registered on 14 September. Diawara was the party's candidate in the 2002 presidential elections, finishing eleventh out of 24 candidates. In the parliamentary elections later in the year, the party joined the Hope 2002 coalition. The alliance won 66 seats in the National Assembly, with PIDS taking one.

The party did not nominate a candidate for the 2013 presidential elections, but supported Soumaïla Cissé of the Union for the Republic and Democracy. The party contested the 2013 parliamentary elections, but failed to win a seat.
