= 2002 Malian presidential election =

- 28 April 2002 (first round); 12 May 2002 (second round)
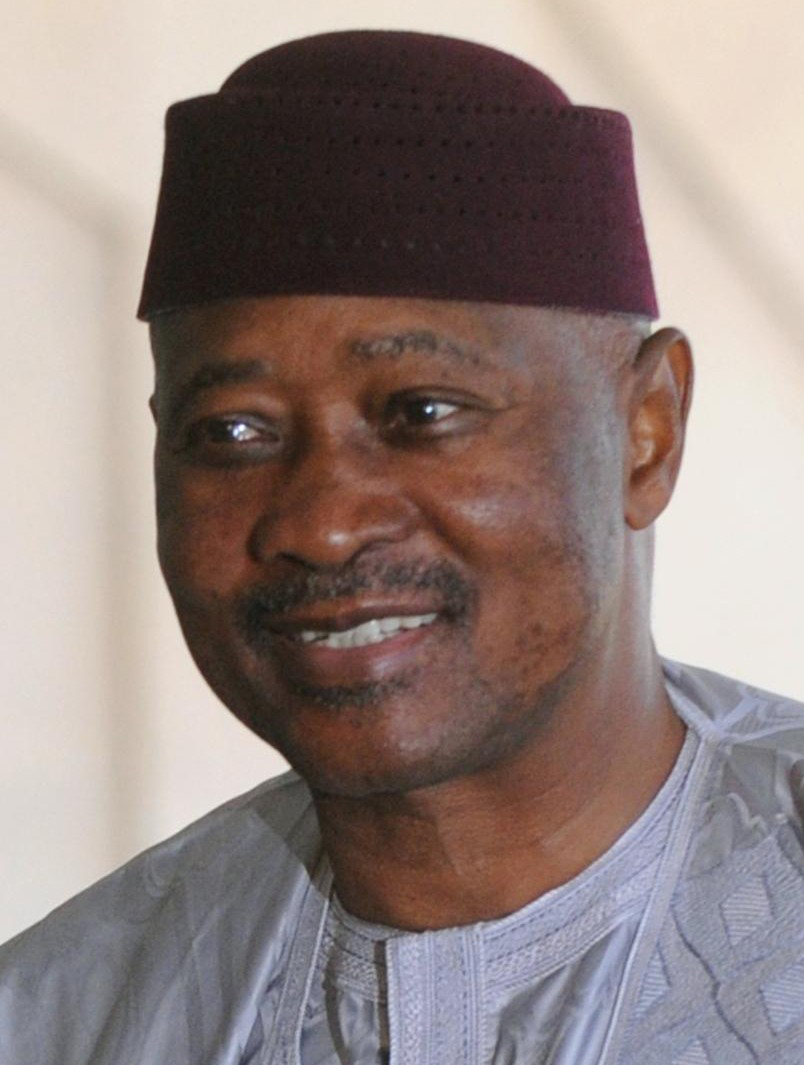

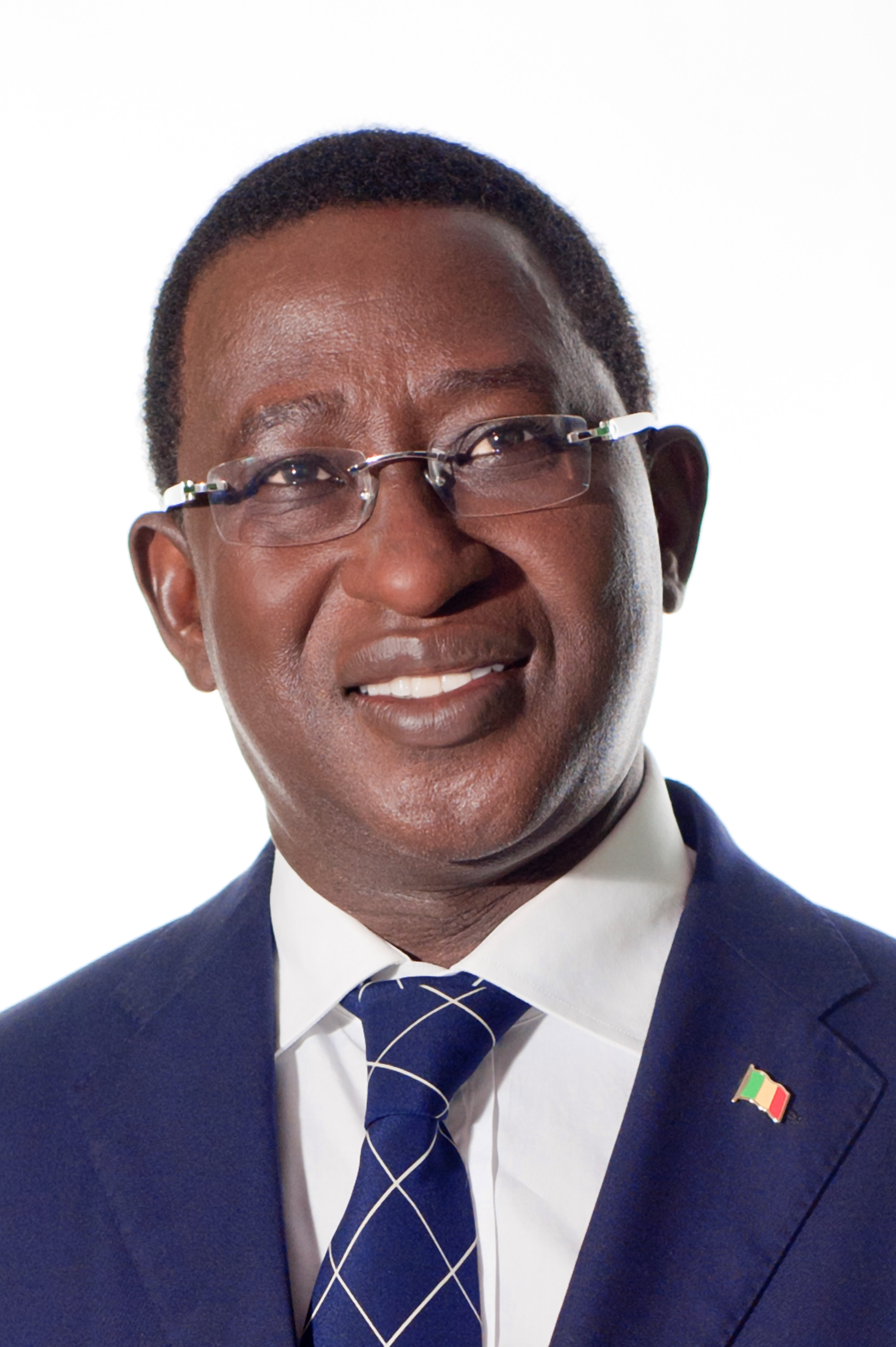
Nominee	Amadou Toumani Touré	Soumaïla Cissé
Party	Independent	ADEMA-PASJ
Popular vote	926,243	498,503
Percentage	65.01%	34.99%
- Second round results by region
President before election
Alpha Oumar Konaré
ADEMA-PASJ
President-elect
Amadou Toumani Touré
Independent

Presidential elections were held in Mali on 28 April 2002, with a run-off on 12 May. The previous president, Alpha Oumar Konaré, stood down after 10 years in office, having been term limited by the Malian constitution to two terms. Amadou Toumani Touré won the election with 65% of the vote in the second round.

== Candidates ==
Twenty-four candidates were certified by the Constitutional Court and stood in the election. Only one candidate, a woman who would have been the country's first female presidential candidate if she had been allowed to run, was prevented from standing for election after failing to provide the deposit of approximately $7,000.

== Electoral system ==
In order to register to contest the elections, candidates had to provide a deposit of approximately $7,000. This was returned if the candidate won over 5% of the vote in the first round. Each candidate was entitled to have a representative at each of the 12,400 polling booths.

The election was held using the two-round system, with a second round held as none of the candidates received over 50% of the vote in the first round.

== Conduct ==
Overall, international observers said the election was well managed and transparent; however, there were many procedural irregularities. After the first round of voting, the Constitutional Court cancelled over 500,000 of the ballots due to problems such as unregistered voters and missing election reports.

== Results ==
Candidate	Party	First round		Second round	
Candidate	Party	Votes	%	Votes	%
Amadou Toumani Touré	Independent	449,176	28.71	926,243	65.01
Soumaïla Cissé	Alliance for Democracy in Mali	333,525	21.31	498,503	34.99
Ibrahim Boubacar Keïta	Rally for Mali	329,143	21.03		
Tiébilé Dramé	Party for National Rebirth	62,493	3.99		
Mountaga Tall	National Congress for Democratic Initiative	58,695	3.75		
Moussa Balla Coulibaly	Union for Democracy and Development	50,211	3.21		
Choguel Kokalla Maïga	Patriotic Movement for Renewal	42,469	2.71		
Mamadou Blaise Sangaré	Social Democratic Convention	34,603	2.21		
Mandé Sidibé	Independent	31,389	2.01		
Ahmed El Madani Diallo	Independent	25,584	1.63		
Daba Diawara	Party for Independence, Democracy and Solidarity	17,156	1.10		
Oumar Mariko	African Solidarity for Democracy and Independence	13,718	0.88		
Madiassa Maguiraga	Popular Party for Progress	12,548	0.80		
Youssouf Hassan Diallo	Independent	12,455	0.80		
Modibo Sangaré	National Union for Rebirth	11,667	0.75		
Mamadou Gakou	Convention for Progress and the People	11,505	0.74		
Mady Konaté	Party for Democracy and Progress	11,302	0.72		
Modibo Kane Kida	Movement of the Free, United and Combined Populations	9,722	0.62		
Mamadou Diaby	Party for Unity, Democracy and Progress	9,101	0.58		
Almamy Sylla	Rally for Democracy and Progress	8,851	0.57		
Habibou Dembélé	Independent	7,964	0.51		
Sanoussi Nanacassé	Independent	7,829	0.50		
Ibrahim Diakité	National Front for Renewal and the Protection of Territorial Integrity	6,899	0.44		
Abdoulaye Sogolomba Konaté	Independent	6,771	0.43		
Total		1,564,776	100.00	1,424,746	100.00
Valid votes		1,564,776	71.09	1,424,746	82.68
Invalid/blank votes		636,378	28.91	298,464	17.32
Total votes		2,201,154	100.00	1,723,210	100.00
Registered voters/turnout		5,746,202	38.31	5,746,202	29.99
Source: African Elections Database
