= Yamoussa Camara (politician) =

Malian Military Officer

Minister of Defence and Veteran Affairs
- In office 24 April 2012 – 5 March 2014
- Prime Minister: Cheick Modibo Diarra; Django Sissoko; Oumar Tatam Ly
- Preceded by: Sadio Gassama
- Succeeded by: Major Colonel Oumar Ndao

Personal details
- Born: c. 1953 Bancoumana, Koulikoro Region, French Sudan
- Awards: Knight of the National Order; Silver Star of National Merit; Assalam 2 Commemorative Medal

Military service
- Allegiance: Mali
- Branch/service: Malian Army
- Years of service: 1981–present
- Rank: Major
- Commands: 133rd Nomadic Company; Chief of Staff of the Presidential Guard

Yamoussa Camara (born c. 1953) is a Malian soldier and politician.

== Education and career ==
He graduated from the École Normale Supérieure in Bamako and the Ecole Superieure de la Guerre (Tunis 2006–2007). He also holds several certificates and patents. His military career led him to the joins the military school in Koulikoro. In 1981, he was promoted to the rank of second lieutenant.

He served as the director of Prytanée Militaire in Kati from February 1996 to 30 March 2000 and later Chief of Staff of the National Guard from May 2011 to 22 March 2012. From 24 April 2012 to 5 March 2014, he served as the Malian Minister of Defence and Veteran Affairs.
