= Front for Democracy and the Republic =

Malian political coalition

The Front for Democracy and the Republic (French: Front pour la démocratie et la république) is an opposition coalition in Mali that fought the presidential election on 29 April 2007 and the parliamentary election of 1 July and 22 July 2007. The FDR is an umbrella organisation, bringing together 16 independent political parties and groups. It rejected the official results of the election, according to which incumbent president Amadou Toumani Touré won with about 71% of the vote, and alleged fraud, unsuccessfully asking the Constitutional Court to annul the election. On 19 May, the leading FDR candidate, National Assembly president Ibrahim Boubacar Kéita, said that the group would abide by the court's decision to confirm Touré's victory and would concentrate on the July 2007 parliamentary election.

Of the eight candidates who fought the presidential election, four were affiliated with the FDR alliance:

- Ibrahim Boubacar Kéita (RPM)
- Tiébilé Dramé (PARENA)
- Soumeylou Boubèye Maïga (Convergence 2007)
- Mamadou Blaise Sangaré (Social Democratic Convention)

The parties and other organisations were:

- Rally for Mali (RPM)
- Party for National Rebirth (PARENA)
- Social Democratic Convention (CDS-Mogotiguiya)
- Concertation démocratique
- COPP
- DPM
- Faso
- MPDD
- PARI
- PER
- PRDDM
- RDR
- RDT
- RJP
- Convergence 2007
- ADJ

In the July 2007 parliamentary election, the FDR won a total of 15 out of 147 seats: 11 for the RPM and four for PARENA.
