= Union for the Republic and Democracy =

Political party in Mali

Union for the Republic and Democracy Union pour la République et la Démocratie
- Abbreviation: URD
- President: Amadou Sankaré
- Founder: Soumaïla Cissé
- Founded: 2003
- Dissolved: 13 May 2025
- Split from: ADEMA–PASJ
- Ideology: Social liberalism
- Political position: Centre to centre-left
- Regional affiliation: Africa Liberal Network
- International affiliation: Centrist Democrat International
- Colours: Green

Website
- https://urd-mali.org

The Union for the Republic and Democracy (French: Union pour la République et la Démocratie [ynjɔ̃ puʁ la ʁepyblik e la demɔkʁasi], URD) was a political party in Mali.

== History ==
The party was formed by those who supported Soumaïla Cissé during the 2002 election. Most of its members came from ADEMA, the former ruling party. It is believed they felt betrayed by outgoing President Alpha Oumar Konaré, who supported Amadou Toumani Touré (eventual winner of the 2002 presidential election) against his own party. The MCCDR of Boubacar Karamoko Coulibaly and the PMDR of Abdoul Wahab Berthe joined the URD. Both men are vice-presidents of the URD.

The party placed second in the 2004 municipal elections and had 17 members in the National Assembly, including prominent members such as Mamadou Awa Gassama Diaby of Yelimane and Baba Oumar Bore of Kita. The party had 114 mayors in Mali including Ali Farka Touré of Niafunke and Demba Fane of the fifth district of Bamako.

The URD backed Amadou Toumani Touré for re-election in the April 2007 presidential election. The party, part of the pro-Touré Alliance for Democracy and Progress (ADP), won 34 out of 147 seats in the July 2007 parliamentary election.

At the URD's Third Ordinary Congress in November 2014, Soumaïla Cissé succeeded Younoussi Touré as President of the URD. Touré was instead designated as Honorary President. Following the 2020 Malian parliamentary election the party won 17 seats out of 147 in the National Assembly of Mali, which made it the third largest political party in parliament.

== See also ==
- Politics of Mali
