= Mamadou Dembelé =

Malian politician

3rd Prime Minister of Mali
- In office 6 June 1986 – 6 June 1988
- President: Moussa Traoré
- Preceded by: Yoro Diakité (1969)
- Succeeded by: Soumana Sacko (1991)

Personal details
- Born: 21 January 1934 Kayes, French Sudan (now Mali)
- Died: 9 October 2016 (aged 82) Bamako, Mali
- Party: UDPM
- Occupation: Politician; Physician

Mamadou Dembelé (21 January 1934 – 9 October 2016) was a Malian physician and politician. Dembelé served as Prime Minister of Mali from 6 June 1986 to 6 June 1988 under President Moussa Traoré. He was a member of the Democratic Union of the Malian People and responsible for the repression of the 1979–80 student movements. He died on 9 October 2016 at the age of 82. Dembélé was to have a state funeral at the paternal home in Darsalam, followed by interment at the cemetery of Hamdallaye on Tuesday 11 October 2016.

Vacant Title last held by Yoro Diakité	Prime Minister of Mali; 1986–1988	Vacant Title next held by Soumana Sacko
