= List of presidents of the National Assembly of Mali =

List of presidents of the National Assembly of Mali.

Below is a list of office-holders:

Name	Took office	Left office	Notes
Mahamane Alassane Haïdara	1961	1967	President of the National Assembly
Mady Sangaré	1979	1985	President of the National Assembly
Sidiki Diarra	1985	1991	President of the National Assembly
Alioune Nouhoum Diallo	1992	2002	President of the National Assembly
Ibrahim Boubacar Keïta	16 September 2002	3 September 2007	President of the National Assembly
Dioncounda Traoré	3 September 2007	12 April 2012	President of the National Assembly
Younoussi Touré	2012	2013	President of the National Assembly
Issaka Sidibé	22 January 2014	11 May 2020	President of the National Assembly
Moussa Timbiné	11 May 2020	18 August 2020	President of the National Assembly
Malick Diaw	5 December 2020	Incumbent	President of the Transitional National Council
