= Soumana Sacko =

Malian politician and economist (1950–2025)

Prime Minister of Mali Acting
- In office 2 April 1991 – 9 June 1992
- President: Amadou Toumani Touré
- Preceded by: Mamadou Dembelé
- Succeeded by: Younoussi Touré

Personal details
- Born: 23 December 1950 Nyamina, French Sudan, French West Africa
- Died: 15 October 2025 (aged 74) Bamako, Mali
- Party: Independent

Soumana Sacko (23 December 1950 – 15 October 2025) was a Malian politician and economist. He served as Prime Minister from 9 April 1991 to 9 June 1992 during the first and transitional presidency of Amadou Toumani Touré.

== Education ==
Sacko obtained a Diplôme d'Etudes en Langue Française (DELF) from the Mopti Examination Center in June 1967 and a baccalaureate in June 1970 from the Lycée Askia Mohamed in Bamako. He also held a bachelor's degree in Project Management Planning from National School of Administration (ENA) and a Master's and Ph.D. in Economics Development (Honours) from the University of Pittsburgh. He also attended training courses and seminars at the West German Foundation for International Development (DSE), Institute for Economic Development of the World Bank and the General Accounting Office of the United States Congress.

== Other positions ==
Sacko held other positions both within and outside of the Mali government. He was previously the Minister of Finance and Commerce in 1987. He became the first Malian to resign from the government in 1987 following a gold trading case involving the First Lady of Mali. Outside of the government, Sacko acted as a senior economist at the United Nations Development Program (UNDP) and Executive Secretary of the African Capacity Building Foundation (ACBF).

== Death ==
Sacko died on 15 October 2025, at the age of 74.

== Sources ==
Political offices
Preceded by Mamadou Dembelé	Prime Minister of Mali; Acting; 1991–1992	Succeeded by Younoussi Touré
