= Mohamed Aly Bathily =

Malian politician

Mohamed Aly Bathily is a Malian politician. He served as the Malian Minister of State Properties, Land Affairs and Assets.

== Early life ==
Mohamed Aly Bathily is a politician and jurist born March 30, 1952, in Bamako. Mohamed Aly Bathily hails from the village of Makhana (Makhalagare). He is married and father of five children.

He was successively high magistrate, professor of law, chief of staff for three Ministers of Justice, ambassador of Mali to Senegal, then lawyer at the Mali bar. In September 2013, he was appointed Minister of Justice in the Oumar Tatam Ly government. He then took charge of the Ministry of State Property, Land Affairs and Assets in January 2015, as part of the reshuffle following the appointment of Modibo Keita as Prime Minister. After a new ministerial reshuffle, he took charge of the Ministry of Urban Planning, Housing, and Land Affairs from April 2017 until December 2017. He was not reappointed in the government of the new Prime Minister Soumeylou Boubèye Maiga.

In June 2024, the Malian government arrested Mohamed Aly Bathily and announced charges against him. On July 8, Mohamed Aly Bathily was placed under arrest warrant.
