= Rally for Mali =

Political party in Mali

Rally for Mali Rassemblement pour le Mali
- Abbreviation: RPM
- President: Bocary Treta
- Founder: Ibrahim Boubacar Keïta
- Founded: June 2001
- Dissolved: 13 May 2025
- Ideology: Social democracy
- Political position: Centre-left
- International affiliation: Socialist International
- Colours: Green; Gold

Website
- http://rpm.ml/

The Rally for Mali (French: Rassemblement pour le Mali, RPM) was a Malian political party created by former president Ibrahim Boubacar Keïta in June 2001.

The RPM was a full member of the Socialist International. The symbol of the party was a weaver.

== History ==
In October 2000, Ibrahim Boubacar Keïta, the former prime minister of Mali, resigned from incumbent President Alpha Oumar Konaré's party, the Alliance for Democracy in Mali-African Party for Solidarity and Justice (ADEMA-PASJ), over which he had presided since 1994. In February 2001, with activists and executives in tow, Keïta created the movement Alternative 2002 to back his bid for president. The Rally for Mali followed in June.

In the first round of the presidential election, held in April 2002, Keïta won 21.04% of the vote, finishing third, after the official candidate of the ADEMA-PASJ, Soumaïla Cissé, and the winner, former acting president Amadou Toumani Touré.

Along with the National Congress for Democratic Initiative (CNID) and the Patriotic Movement for Renewal (MPR), Rally for Mali was part of the Hope 2002 coalition for the 2002 legislative election, after which it became the second biggest political party in parliament, with 45 deputies.

The Rally won roughly 13% of the vote in the municipal elections of 30 May 2004.

In January 2007, Keïta was again designated as the party's candidate for the April 2007 presidential election. In the election, he took second place behind Touré, receiving 19.15% of the vote. The RPM, part of the opposition Front for Democracy and the Republic (FDR), won 11 out of 147 seats in the July 2007 parliamentary election.

In 2013, the RPM won both the presidential and parliamentary elections, after Mali transitioned back to democracy following the 2012 military coup.

In May 2025, Mali's military junta dissolved all political parties in the country, including Rally for Mali.

== Electoral history ==
=== Presidential elections ===
| Election | Party candidate | Votes | % | Votes | % | Result |
| Election | Party candidate | First Round | | Second Round | | Result |
|---|---|---|---|---|---|---|
| 2007 | Ibrahim Boubacar Keïta | 433,897 | 19.15% | - | - | Lost ✗ |
| 2013 | Ibrahim Boubacar Keïta | 1,222,657 | 39.23% | 2,354,693 | 77.61% | Elected ✓ |
| 2018 | Ibrahim Boubacar Keïta | 1,331,132 | 41.70% | 1,798,632 | 67.17% | Elected ✓ |

=== National Assembly elections ===
| Election | Party leader | Votes | % | Seats | +/– |
|---|---|---|---|---|---|
| 2002 | Ibrahim Boubacar Keïta | | | 46 / 160 | ▲46 |
| 2007 | Ibrahim Boubacar Keïta | | | 11 / 160 | ▼35 |
| 2013 | Ibrahim Boubacar Keïta | 708,716 | 29.4% | 66 / 147 | ▲55 |
| 2020 | Ibrahim Boubacar Keïta | | | 51 / 147 | ▼15 |
