= Constitution of Mali =

The Constitution of Mali is the supreme law of Mali. The 1992 constitution was approved by a referendum on 12 January 1992 after being drawn up by a national conference in August 1991 and provides for multi party democracy within a semi-presidential system. It was briefly suspended after the 2012 military coup. The 1992 constitution was replaced in 2023 by General Assimi Goita, which strengths the president's power along with other changes.

== 1992 constitution ==
The original Malian constitution was abrogated on 6 December 1968 after a military coup d'état and replaced by a new fundamental law. A new constitution adopted in 1974 after a referendum on 2 June 1974 created a one party state while moving the state from military rule. This constitution lasted until the overthrow of Moussa Traoré in a coup d'état in 1991.

The new regime under Amadou Toumani Touré moved to establish a national conference which drew up the new constitution in August 1991. This constitution was overwhelmingly approved by referendum on 12 January 1992 with over 98% of those voting approving the constitution.

=== Features ===
Under the constitution the president is the chief of state and head of the armed forces. He is elected to a five-year term, with a limit of two terms, and appoints the prime minister as head of the government. The Prime Minister is responsible to the National Assembly of Mali and can be removed by a no confidence vote. The constitution provides for multi party democracy with the only prohibition against parties on ethnic, gender, regional or religious grounds.

The constitution states that Mali adheres to the Universal Declaration of Human Rights and the African Charter on Human and Peoples' Rights. It guarantees the right to strike and the independence of the judiciary. The Constitutional Court decides whether laws abide by the constitution and guarantees the liberties and fundamental rights of the people of Mali.

== 2023 constitution ==
The 1992 constitution was replaced with the 2023 constitution that was made under the leadership of General Assimi Goita. It was replaced following a referendum held by the Malian military junta.
