= Alliance for Democracy in Mali =

Political party in Mali

Alliance for Democracy in Mali – African Party for Solidarity and Justice Alliance pour la démocratie au Mali – Parti africain pour la solidarité et la justice
- Abbreviation: ADEMA–PASJ
- President: Tiémoko Sangaré
- Founder: Abdrahamane Baba Touré
- Founded: 25 October 1990 (35 years, 230 days)
- Dissolved: 13 May 2025 (1 year, 30 days)
- Headquarters: Bamako
- Ideology: Social democracy Democratic socialism African nationalism Pan-Africanism
- Political position: Centre-left
- International affiliation: Socialist International
- Colours: Red; White
- Slogan: Travail-Solidarité-Justice ('Labour-Solidarity-Justice')

Website
- adema-pasj.ml

The Alliance for Democracy in Mali – African Party for Solidarity and Justice (French: Alliance pour la démocratie au Mali – Parti africain pour la solidarité et la justice, ADEMA–PASJ) was a political party in Mali.

On October 25, 1990, opponents of the dictatorship of Moussa Traoré (leader of UPDM) joined together as ADEMA. This umbrella movement included activists of the following organizations:

- Sudanese Union – African Democratic Rally (Soudanaise-Rassemblement Démocratique Africain, US–RDA), party of the former president Modibo Keïta
- the Malian Party for Revolution and Democracy (le Parti malien pour la révolution et la démocratie, PMDR)
- the Malian Party of Labour (Parti malien du travail, PMT), a Marxist-Leninist organization
- the Malian Popular and Democratic Front (le Front démocratique et populaire malien, FDPM), composed primarily of Malian emigrants and political exiles

ADEMA also attracted many supporters with no previous political affiliation.

On May 25, 1991, after the regime of Moussa Traoré was overthrown by General Amadou Toumani Touré, ADEMA transformed itself into an official political party and took the name Alliance for Democracy in Mali-African Party for Solidarity and Justice (ADEMA-Parti Africain pour la Solidarité et la Justice, ADEMA-PASJ).

In 1992, ADEMA-PASJ dominated the February and March legislative elections, claiming 76 of 116 seats in the Malian National Assembly. Its presidential candidate, Alpha Oumar Konaré, was elected President of the Republic. ADEMA-PASJ continued to dominate the government for the following decade, and Konaré was re-elected in 1997 following an opposition boycott of the polls.

At the end of Konaré's second term, ADEMA-PASJ divided over the succession of the presidency, with Ibrahim Boubacar Keïta leaving the party in October 2000 to form the Rally for Mali (Rassemblement pour le Mali, RPM). Former prime minister Mandé Sidibé also left in order to enter the presidential race.

In 2002, Soumaïla Cissé was the official presidential candidate of ADEMA-PASJ. He won 22.7% of the vote in the first round of the presidential election, held on 28 April, and was defeated by Amadou Toumani Touré in the second round, held on 12 May, receiving 35.7% of the vote. In the parliamentary election held on 14 July 2002, the party won 45 out of 160 seats. 6 additional seats were won by partners in the Alliance for Republic and Democracy.

ADEMA-PASJ backed Touré for re-election in the April 2007 presidential election. This move was opposed by party vice-president Soumeylou Boubèye Maiga, who was consequently expelled from the party. In the July 2007 parliamentary election, ADEMA-PASJ won 51 out of 147 seats, more than any other party.

Dramane Dembélé was the ADEMA candidate for the July 2013 presidential election. He placed third in the election, receiving 9.6% of the vote. On 3 August 2013, he announced his support for Ibrahim Boubacar Keïta in the second round, saying that "we are in the Socialist International, we share the same values". However, in endorsing Keïta he contradicted the official stance of ADEMA, which had backed Keïta's rival, Soumaïla Cissé, on the previous day. The party stressed that Dembélé was speaking only for himself and that the party still supported Cissé.

ADEMA-PASJ's motto is "Work-Solidarity-Justice"; its symbol is the bee. The current party president is Dioncounda Traoré.

ADEMA-PASJ is a full member of the Socialist International.

== Electoral history ==
=== Presidential elections ===
Election	Party candidate	Votes	%	Votes	%	Result
Election	Party candidate	First Round		Second Round		Result
1992	Alpha Oumar Konaré	493,973	45.0%	655,555	69.0%	Elected ✓
1997	Alpha Oumar Konaré	1,395,581	84.4%	-	-	Elected ✓
2002	Soumaïla Cissé	333,525	21.31%	498,503	34.99%	Lost ✗
2013	Dramane Dembélé	298,748	9.59%	-	-	Lost ✗
2018	-	-	-	-	-	Lost ✗

=== National Assembly elections ===
Election	Votes	%	Seats	+/–
1992	476,254	48.4%	76 / 129	▲76
1997 (Apr)	687,156	42.60%	Invalidated	Steady
1997 (Jul)	698,690	62.8%	128 / 147	▲52
2002			53 / 160	▼75
2007			51 / 160	▼2
2013	277,517	11.5%	16 / 147	▼35
2020			24 / 147	▲8
