= Django Sissoko =

Malian politician (1948–2022)

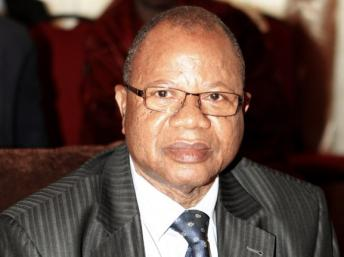

Prime Minister of Mali Acting
- In office 11 December 2012 – 5 September 2013
- President: Dioncounda Traoré (Acting); Ibrahim Boubacar Keïta
- Preceded by: Cheick Modibo Diarra (Acting)
- Succeeded by: Oumar Tatam Ly

Personal details
- Born: 1948 French Sudan, French West Africa, France
- Died: 4 April 2022 (aged 73–74) Bamako, Mali
- Party: Independent
- Education: National School of Administration, Mali; University of Caen; International Institute of Public; Administration; University of Rouen

Django Sissoko (1948 – 4 April 2022) was a Malian civil servant who was Prime Minister of Mali from December 2012 to September 2013. He was Minister of Justice from 1984 to 1988 and subsequently served twice as Secretary-General of the Presidency, from 1988 to 1991 and from 2008 to 2011. He also served as Ombudsman from 2011 to 2012.

Sissoko was appointed prime minister in the evening of 11 December 2012 shortly after the arrest of his predecessor, Cheick Modibo Diarra, by the leaders of the March 2012 coup d'etat; Diarra had been forced to resign.

== Early life ==
Sissoko studied at the National School of Administration in Mali and France's University of Caen, International Institute of Public Administration and the University of Rouen.

== Civil service ==
From 1972 to 1979, Sissoko was successively the deputy director and director of Prison Services, as well as director of the Central Prison of Bamako, the Malian capital. Subsequently, he was the national director of the Civil Service and Personnel from 1982 to 1983 and director of the Cabinet of the Minister of Labor and the Civil Service from 1983 to 1984. Sissoko also worked for the IMF, World Bank, African Development Bank and the Islamic Development Bank.

== Politics ==
Sissoko entered the government as Minister of Justice in December 1984; he held that position until February 1988, when he was appointed Secretary-General of the Presidency. He was Secretary-General of the Presidency until the ouster of Moussa Traoré in March 1991, obtaining the rank of Minister in June 1989.

Sissoko worked as a consultant from 1994 to 2002. He then became Director of the Cabinet of the Prime Minister on 13 November 2002, and after serving in that post for over five years, he was instead appointed to his former position as Secretary-General of the Presidency, with the rank of Minister, on 26 January 2008. He was succeeded as Director of the Cabinet of the Prime Minister by Sanoussi Touré on 4 February 2008. Sissoko was then appointed to the post of Ombudsman on 18 May 2011.

=== Prime minister ===
Sissoko was appointed Prime Minister of Mali on 11 December 2012 following the arrest by the perpetrators of the 2012 Malian coup d'etat and subsequent resignation of his predecessor Cheick Modibo Diarra. His appointment was announced on state television. Tensions between the military and Diarra, who was appointed due to external pressure, arose after he supported an ECOWAS intervention force of 3,300 troops to Azawad, which ran counter to Malian military opposition to foreign intervention instead of simple financial and logistical support. It also came a day after European Union's support for a 250-member training mission for about four battalions of the Malian army.

Meanwhile, the coerced resignation of Diarra was condemned by the UN; however, Captain Amadou Sanogo said it was not coerced, only facilitated, by the military. His appointment also followed assurances from President Dioncounda Traoré to appoint a civilian prime minister within 24 hours of Diarra's resignation after the United Nations threatened to impose sanctions over the arrest, with the United Nations Security Council saying it could take "appropriate measures" against the perpetrators for allegedly undermining Mali's stability. A statement by the UNSC read: "The members of the Security Council express their readiness to consider appropriate measures, including targeted sanctions, against those who prevent the restoration of the constitutional order and take actions that undermine stability in Mali;" while UN Secretary General Ban Ki-moon said he was "troubled" by incident which ran counter to what he said was national and international efforts to resolve the political crisis in Mali after the earlier coup d'etat and northern takeover. The events were also condemned by ECOWAS and the United States, who said the military's return to politics was a "setback" to democracy.

The composition of Sissoko's government was announced on 15 December 2012. It was largely unchanged from the previous government, headed by Diarra, but it was more representative of the northern regions, which were occupied by Islamist rebels. Several important portfolios were retained by ministers associated with the coup leaders, illustrating their continued influence over the government.

After Ibrahim Boubacar Keïta was sworn in as president on 4 September 2013, he appointed the banking official Oumar Tatam Ly to succeed Sissoko as prime minister on 5 September.

Sissoko headed the African Union's observer mission for July 2017 parliamentary election.

== Notes ==
1. Also encountered in sources as Diango Cissoko or Django Cissoko

Political offices
| Preceded by Cheick Modibo Diarra; Acting | Prime Minister of Mali; Acting; 2012–2013 | Succeeded by Oumar Tatam Ly |
