= Cheick Modibo Diarra =

Malian astrophysicist, businessman and politician (born 1952)

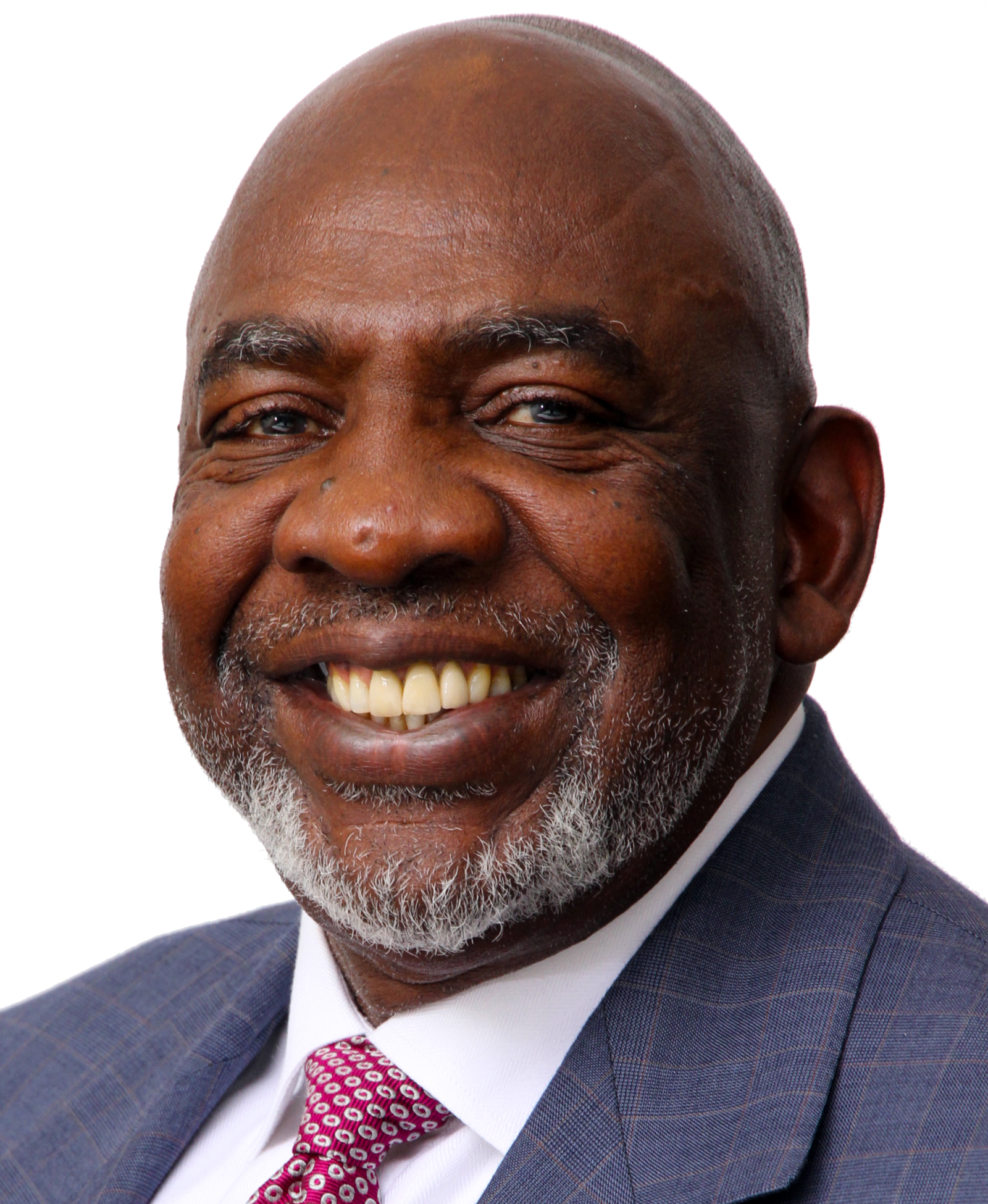

Prime Minister of Mali Acting
- In office 17 April 2012 – 11 December 2012
- President: Dioncounda Traoré (Acting)
- Preceded by: Cissé Mariam Kaïdama Sidibé
- Succeeded by: Django Sissoko (Acting)

Personal details
- Born: 1952 (age 73–74) Nioro du Sahel, French Sudan (now Mali)
- Party: Rally for the Development of Mali
- Education: Pierre and Marie Curie University; Howard University

Cheick Modibo Diarra (born 1952) is a Malian astrophysicist, businessman, and politician who was acting Prime Minister of Mali from April 2012 to December 2012.

On 11 December 2012, Diarra presented his resignation on state television in a broadcast at 4 a.m. local time, hours after soldiers who led the 2012 Malian coup d'état arrested him at his home in Bamako.

== Life and career ==
Diarra was born in Nioro du Sahel, Mali. He is a Bambara and the son-in-law of former president Moussa Traoré. After graduating high school in Mali, Cheick Modibo Diarra studied mathematics, physics, and analytic mechanics in Paris at the University of Pierre and Marie Curie. He then received a master's degree in aerospace engineering and a PhD in mechanical engineering, both from Howard University in Washington, D.C. He was recruited by Caltech's Jet Propulsion Laboratory, a NASA Federally Funded Research and Development Center (FFRDC) operated under contract by the California Institute of Technology, where he played a role in several NASA programs, including the Magellan probe to Venus, the Ulysses probe to the Sun, the Galileo spacecraft to Jupiter, and the Mars Observer and Mars Pathfinder. He later became the director of education and public outreach for NASA's Mars Exploration program. Diarra also was an executive for the Microsoft Corporation. He also obtained American citizenship.

In 1999, he obtained permission from NASA to work part-time in order to devote himself to education development in Africa, founding the Pathfinder Foundation. He took a further sabbatical in 2002 to found a laboratory in Bamako, Mali for the development of solar energy. In 2000 and 2001 he also was a goodwill ambassador for UNESCO. In 2002 and 2003 he was CEO of the African Virtual University, based in Kenya.

Cheick Modibo Diarra was the chairman of Microsoft Africa from 2006 until the end of 2011. Turning to Malian politics, he founded the Rally for the Development of Mali, a political party, in March 2011, and he intended to stand as a candidate in the 2012 presidential election.

=== Acting Prime Minister ===
Cheick Modibo Diarra was appointed interim Prime Minister of Mali on 17 April 2012 to help restore civilian rule after the March 2012 coup d'état. His government, composed of 24 members, was appointed on 25 April 2012. Three of the most important posts—the ministries for defense, internal security, and territorial administration—were assigned to officers associated with the military junta that seized power in March and retained an important role even after formally returning power to civilians. Otherwise, the government was composed of technocrats rather than political figures.

On 11 December 2012, soldiers reportedly sent by coup leader Captain Amadou Sanogo arrested Diarra as he prepared to leave the country for a medical check-up in France. Shortly after his arrest, Diarra appeared on state television and announced his resignation and that of his government.

On 1 December 2013, ALN, an alliance of independent top tier African law firms, announced the appointment of Diarra as its chairman. Diarra succeeded John Miles, the CEO of J Miles & Co.

Political offices
Preceded by Cissé Mariam Kaïdama Sidibé	Prime Minister of Mali; Acting; 2012	Succeeded by Django Sissoko; Acting
