= Soumaïla Cissé =

Malian politician (1949–2020)

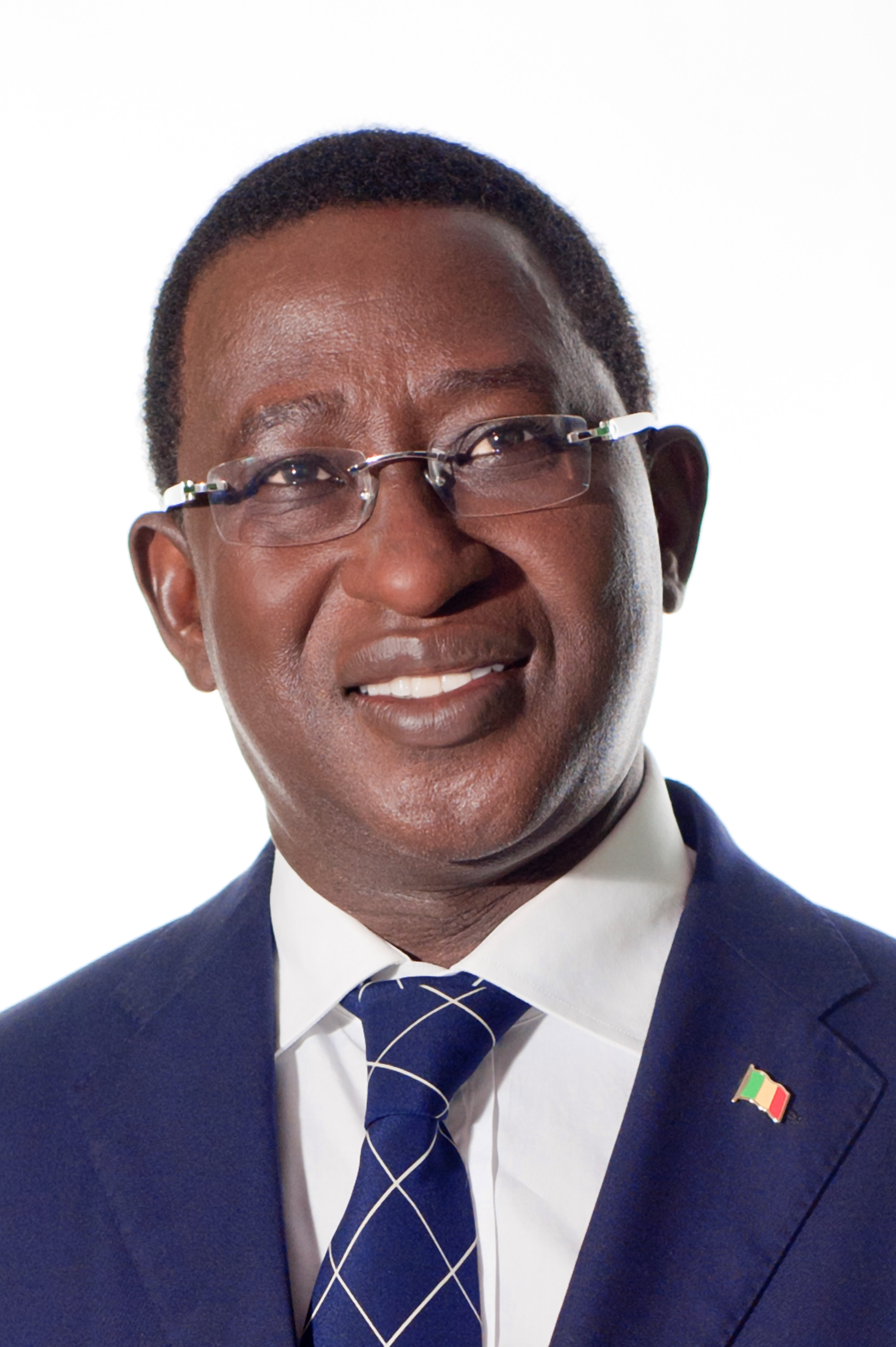
- Cissé in 2013

Member of the National Assembly
- In office 24 November 2013 – 18 August 2020

President of the UEMOA Commission
- In office January 2004 – August 2011

Minister of Equipment, Territorial Planning, Environment and Urbanism
- In office 2000–2002

Minister of Finance
- In office 1993–2000
- Preceded by: Mahamar Oumar Maiga
- Succeeded by: Bakari Koné

Secretary General of the Presidency of the Republic

Personal details
- Born: 20 December 1949 Nianfuke, Timbuktu, French Sudan
- Died: 25 December 2020 (aged 71) Neuilly-sur-Seine, France
- Party: Union for the Republic and Democracy
- Spouse: Astan Traore (m. 1978)
- Children: 4
- Education: École polytechnique universitaire de Montpellier; Cheikh Anta Diop University of Dakar
- Awards: Commander of the National Order of Benin Officer of the Merit of the National Order of the Lion (Senegal) Commander of the National Order of Mali Medal of recognition of the Chamber of Commerce and Industry of Mali

Soumaïla Cissé (20 December 1949 – 25 December 2020) was a Malian politician who served in the government of Mali as Minister of Finance from 1993 to 2000.

He thrice stood unsuccessfully as a presidential candidate, in 2002, 2013 and 2018; on all three occasions he was defeated in a second round of voting.

From 2014 until his death he was President of the Union for the Republic and Democracy, a political party.

== Life and career ==
Born in Nianfuke, near Timbuktu, on 20 December 1949, Soumaïla Cissé studied at l'Institut des Sciences de l'Ingénieur de Montpellier in France to become a software engineer. He worked for several large French companies (IBM-France, le Groupe Pechiney, le Groupe Thomson and the aerospace company Air Inter) before returning to Mali in 1984 to work at the Compagnie malienne pour le développement du textile (CMDT).

Following the creation of the Alliance for Democracy in Mali (Alliance pour la démocratie au Mali - Parti africain pour la solidarité et la justice, ADEMA-PASJ) and the 1992 election of ADEMA candidate Alpha Oumar Konaré as President, Cissé became the Secretary-General of the Presidency. In 1993, he was named Minister of Finance, then in 2000, Minister of Equipment, Management of Territory, Environment, and Urban Planning in the government of Mandé Sidibé.

Cissé was elected as the Third Vice-President of ADEMA-PASJ at the party's first extraordinary congress, held between 25 and 28 November 2000. In January 2002, he resigned from the government to devote himself to preparation for the 2002 presidential election, and ADEMA-PASJ selected him as its candidate to succeed Alpha Oumar Konaré. Cissé took second place in the first round of the election with 21.31% of the vote, but he lost to Amadou Toumani Touré in the second round, taking 34.99% of the vote.

Considering himself overthrown by a faction of ADEMA-PASJ, Cissé left the party with a group of loyalists to found the Union for the Republic and Democracy (Union pour la république et la démocratie, URD) in June 2003. He subsequently served as President of the Commission of the West African Monetary Union (UEMOA) from 2004 to 2011.

Cissé spoke out against the 2012 Malian coup d'état and was badly wounded on 18 April when men attacked him at his house. He spent the following period in France and Senegal.

Cissé ran as a candidate in the 2013 Malian presidential election. He lost in the second round to Ibrahim Boubacar Keïta.

At the URD's Third Ordinary Congress in November 2014, Soumaïla Cissé succeeded Younoussi Touré as President of the URD.

Cissé ran as candidate in the 2018 Malian presidential election. He once again lost in the second round against Ibrahim Boubacar Keïta and obtained 32% of the vote.

== Kidnapping ==
On 26 March 2020, while on a campaign trip in Timbuktu region, Cissé was taken hostage by an unknown jihadist group. A few days after his kidnapping he was elected to the National Assembly, but the government confirmed that there was no news of his whereabouts. It was later confirmed that he had been abducted by Jama'at Nasr al-Islam wal Muslimin, and he was released, alongside Sophie Pétronin, on 6 October.

== Personal life ==
Cissé was married to Astan Traore since 1978.

Cissé died in Neuilly-sur-Seine, France on December 25, 2020, five days after he turned 71, after contracting COVID-19 during the COVID-19 pandemic in France.

== See also ==
- List of kidnappings
- List of solved missing person cases (2020s)

== Notes ==
- This article is based on a translation of the corresponding article from the French Wikipedia, retrieved on 27 June 2005.
