= Amadou Toumani Touré =

Leader of Mali (1991–1992, 2002–2012)

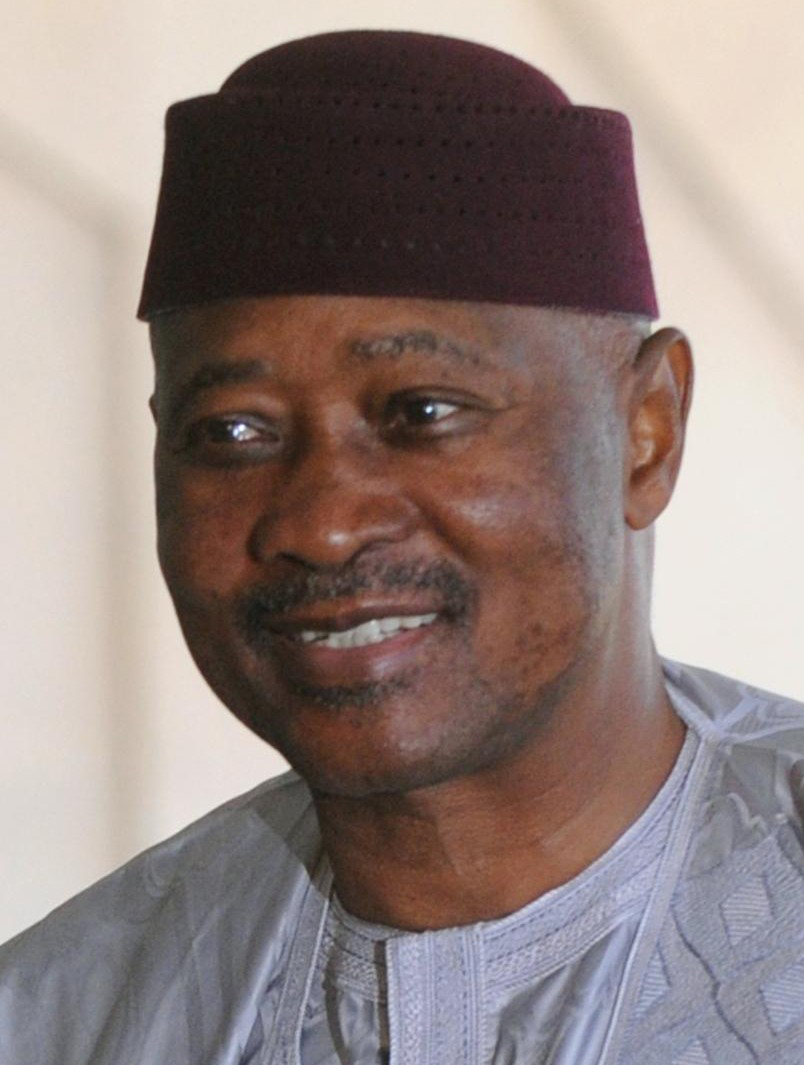
- Touré in 2010

4th President of Mali
- In office 8 June 2002 – 22 March 2012
- Prime Minister: Ahmed Mohamed ag Hamani; Ousmane Issoufi Maïga; Modibo Sidibé; Cissé Mariam Kaïdama Sidibé
- Preceded by: Alpha Oumar Konaré
- Succeeded by: Amadou Sanogo (acting); Ibrahim Boubacar Keïta
- De facto 26 March 1991 – 8 June 1992
- Prime Minister: Soumana Sacko
- Preceded by: Moussa Traoré
- Succeeded by: Alpha Oumar Konaré

Personal details
- Born: 4 November 1948 Mopti, French Sudan (now Mali)
- Died: 9 November 2020 (aged 72) Istanbul, Turkey
- Party: Independent
- Spouse: Lobbo Traore

Military service
- Branch/service: Army
- Years of service: 1969–2001
- Rank: Army general
- Battles/wars: Agacher Strip War; Tuareg rebellion (1990–1995)

Amadou Toumani Touré (4 November 1948 – 9 November 2020), also popularly known by his initials ATT (French pronunciation: [atete]), was a Malian politician and military officer who served as Mali's head of state twice, from 1991 to 1992 as acting president and again as a democratically elected president from 2002 until he was deposed in a coup in 2012.

Touré was head of President Moussa Traoré's personal guard (and parachute regiment) when a popular revolution and a coup overthrew the regime in March 1991. Touré then arrested Traoré and led the revolution onward. He presided over a year-long military-civilian transition process that produced a new Constitution and multiparty elections, then handed power to Mali's first democratically elected president, Alpha Oumar Konaré, on 8 June 1992. Konaré promoted Touré to the rank of General.

Ten years later, after retiring from the army, Touré entered politics as a civilian and won the 2002 presidential election with a broad coalition of support. He was easily re-elected in 2007 to a second and final term. On 22 March 2012, shortly before his scheduled departure from office, disgruntled soldiers initiated a coup d'état that forced him into hiding. As part of the agreement to restore constitutional order to Mali, Touré resigned from the presidency on 8 April, and eleven days later he went into exile.

== Early life ==
Amadou Toumani Touré was born on 4 November 1948, in Mopti, where he attended primary school, he is from the Fulani tribe of in Central Mali. Between1966 and 1969, he attended Badalabougou Standard Secondary School in Bamako in order to become a teacher. Eventually, he joined the army and attended the Kati Inter-Military College. As a member of the Parachute Corps, he rose quickly through the ranks and after numerous training courses in the Soviet Union and France, he became the commander of the parachute commandos in 1984.

== Political and military career ==
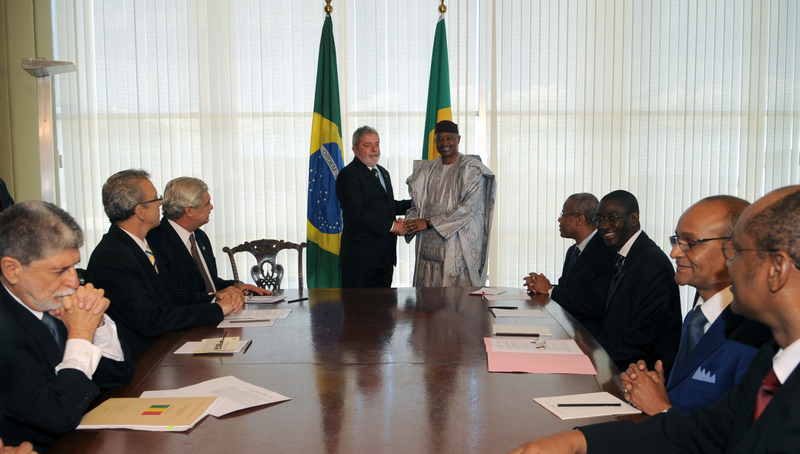
Amadou Touré with President Lula da Silva and government ministers of Brazil.

In March 1991, after the violent suppression of anti-government demonstrations turned into a popular revolution against 23 years of military rule, the armed forces refused to fire any longer on the Malian people and Touré – head of the presidential guard – arrested President Moussa Traoré. Known universally by his initials ATT, Colonel Touré (as he then was) became leader of the Transitional Committee for the Welfare of the People and acting head of state throughout the committee's efforts to transition the country's government to democracy. He presided over the national conference that between 29 July and 13 August 1991 drew up the Constitution of Mali and scheduled the legislative and presidential elections of 1992. After the results of the elections became known, Touré handed over power to the newly elected president, Alpha Oumar Konaré. Following his voluntary departure from office, he gained the nickname "The Soldier of Democracy."

In June 2001, Touré served briefly as a special envoy of UN Secretary General Kofi Annan to the Central African Republic, after the failed coup attempt that had occurred there.

=== Election and presidency (2002–2012) ===
In September 2001, he requested and was granted retirement from the military, entering politics as a candidate in the 2002 presidential election. In the first round of voting, he placed first with 28.71% of the vote, while in the second round he won 64.35% of the vote, defeating the ADEMA candidate, former cabinet minister Soumaïla Cissé, who obtained 35.65%. Touré was sworn in on 8 June 2002.

His presidency was atypical, in part due to the fact that he was not a member of any political party and that he included members from all of the country's political parties in his government. Following his 2002 election, he appointed Ahmed Mohamed ag Hamani as Prime Minister, but on 28 April 2004, Hamani was replaced by Ousmane Issoufi Maiga, who in turn was replaced on 28 September 2007 by Modibo Sidibé.

In 2006 the government signed a peace deal with Tuareg rebels, giving them greater autonomy.

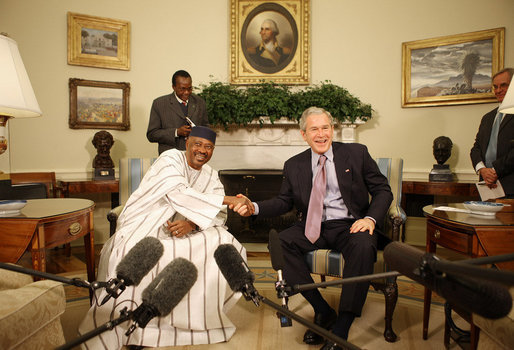
Touré meeting with U.S. President George W. Bush

Touré announced on 27 March 2007, that he would run for a second term in the April 2007 presidential election. According to final results announced on 12 May, Touré won the election with 71.20% of the votes. The main opposition candidate, National Assembly President Ibrahima Boubacar Keïta, won 19.15%; the Front for Democracy and the Republic, a coalition including Keïta and three other candidates, rejected the official results. Foreign observers, however, endorsed the election as free and fair. Touré was sworn in for his second term as president on 8 June 2007, at a ceremony attended by seven other African presidents.

In addition to improving Mali's infrastructure, Touré established the first national medical insurance system.

Conforming to the constitution of Mali, which has a two-term presidential limit, Touré confirmed at a press conference on 12 June 2011, that he would not stand in the 2012 presidential election.

=== 2012 coup d'état ===
Early in 2012, elements of the Malian military protested the Touré government's handling of the 2012 insurgency in northern Mali. The brutal massacre in Aguel Hoc (frontier with Niger) of more than 80 Malian soldiers led to unrest in the army, with soldiers and army wives accusing President Touré of mismanagement because of ammunition shortages. On 21 March, soldiers at a barracks in Kati, near Bamako, launched a revolt against the visiting defense minister, and their revolt turned into a coup d'état. A group of sergeants and corporals seized several locations in Bamako, including the presidential palace, state television headquarters, and some military barracks. They then formed a provisional governmental authority, the National Committee for the Restoration of Democracy and State (CNRDRE), under the leadership of Captain Amadou Sanogo, and declared that they had overthrown Touré, accusing his government of incompetence. President Touré was not taken into custody by the rebels.

For more than two weeks Touré's whereabouts were unknown and CNRDRE never indicated that he was in its custody. The CNRDRE did, however, state that Touré was in "good health" and a statement from the Nigerian government, though supportive of Touré, claimed that he had been "detained" by the mutineers. According to soldiers loyal to Touré, however, he was safe, and guarded by pro-government military forces at a barracks somewhere outside of Bamako.

On 3 April, the junta announced that it was considering charges of treason and financial misconduct against Touré.

On 8 April, Touré reemerged to announce his resignation in accordance with an agreement brokered by the Economic Community of West African States (ECOWAS) to return Mali to constitutional rule, telling ECOWAS mediators, "More than anything, I do it out of the love I have for my country". On 19 April, Touré went into exile in neighboring Senegal.

Amadou Toumani Touré returned to Mali after five years, on 24 December 2017.

== Other work ==
In 1993, Touré founded Fondation pour l'enfance, a children's health foundation. During his presidency, the foundation was managed by First Lady Toure Lobbo Traore.

Touré was a member of the Earth Charter International Commission.

== Personal life ==
Touré was married to Touré Lobbo Traoré. They had three daughters. He died in Istanbul, Turkey, on 9 November 2020, five days after his 72nd birthday.

== Honours ==
- Mali: Grand Master & Grand Cross of the National Order of Mali
- Austria: Grand Star of the Decoration of Honour for Services to the Republic of Austria (2009)
- Luxembourg: Grand Cross of the Order of Adolphe of Nassau (11/2005)
- Monaco: Grand Cross of the Order of Saint-Charles (13 February 2012)
- Senegal: Premier Prix pour l'Ethique, Fondation Amadou Kéba Mbaye (2010)

Political offices
Preceded by Moussa Traoré	President of Mali; 1991–1992	Succeeded by Alpha Oumar Konaré
Preceded by Alpha Oumar Konaré	President of Mali; 2002–2012	Succeeded by Amadou Sanogo as Chairperson of the National Committee for the Restoration of Democracy and State of Mali
