= Politics of Mali =

The politics of Mali take place within the context of a military junta that has been in power since the 2020 and 2021 military coups. Mali was a secular multi-party constitutional republic, in which the president of Mali was the head of state and the prime minister was the head of government. Mali experienced increasing democratization and civil liberties from the early 1990s until the 2012 Tuareg rebellion and subsequent military coup. Though constitutional rule was restored, there was increasing instability, culminating in the 2020 and 2021 coups. The Malian military junta, consisting of five army generals, announced a "Charter of Transition" before enacting a new constitution in 2023. Although there was a constitutional separation of executive, legislative, and judicial powers, in practice the political system is dominated by the junta.

The original constitution, adopted in 1992, identifies eight institutions of the state; including the presidency; the government; the National Assembly; the Supreme, Constitutional, and High Courts; the High Council of Territorial Units; and the Economic, Social, and Cultural Council. Executive power is held by the government, and it was responsible to the National Assembly, which held legislative power. The government, consisting of the Council of Ministers, is led by the prime minister, appointed and presided over by the president. The constitution also provided for an independent judiciary. The 2023 constitution still guarantees civil liberties on paper, but it changed Mali's political system from a semi-presidential system to a presidential system, in which the government is responsible to the president rather than the legislature.

In August 2018, President Ibrahim Boubacar Keita was re-elected for a new five-year term after winning the second round of the election against Soumaïla Cissé. However, in August 2020 a coup d'état ousted the president and prime minister. On 25 September 2020, retired colonel and former defence minister Bah Ndaw was sworn in as Mali's interim president. On 15 April 2021, the transitional administration announced that legislative and presidential elections will be held on 27 February 2022. On 7 June 2021, Col. Assimi Goita was sworn into office as the new interim president. On 30 December 2021, the transitional administration announced plans to delay the election by six months to five years in part because of security issues. On 14 May 2025, the military junta ordered the dissolution of all political parties and organizations. On 4 July 2025 a law was passed by the National Transitional Council that gave Goita a five year term that is renewable indefinitely without elections.

== Executive branch ==
Main office-holders
Office	Name	Party	Since
Interim President	Assimi Goita	Military	25 May 2021
Prime Minister	Abdoulaye Maïga	Military	21 November 2024

The executive branch consists of the President of Mali and the Government of Mali, led by the Prime Minister of Mali.

Under Mali's 1992 constitution, the president is chief of state and commander in chief of the armed forces. The president is elected to 5-year terms by direct popular vote. He is limited to two terms.

The Prime Minister of Mali is the head of government. They are appointed by the president and are responsible for the appointment of the other ministers of government.

The president chairs the Council of Ministers (the prime minister and currently 27 other ministers), which adopts a proposals for laws submitted to the National Assembly for approval of them.

== Legislative branch ==
The National Assembly is the sole legislative arm of the Malian government. It has 160 members, who are elected directly for a five-year term by party list. 147 members are elected in single-seat constituencies and 13 members elected by Malians abroad. Representation is apportioned according to the population of administrative districts.

The Assembly meets for two regular sessions each year. It debates and votes on legislation proposed either by one of its members or by the government; it also has the right to question government ministers about government actions and policies. Eight political parties, aggregated into four parliamentary groups, are represented in the Assembly. In the 2020 election, the Rally for Mali retained a majority of seats, despite losing 15 seats.

== Political parties and elections ==
Mali's constitution provides for a multi-party democracy, with the only restriction being a prohibition against parties based on ethnic, religious, regional, or gender lines. In addition to those political parties represented in the National Assembly, others are active in municipal councils.

=== Presidential elections ===
Candidate	Party	First round		Second round	
Candidate	Party	Votes	%	Votes	%
Ibrahim Boubacar Keïta	Rally for Mali	1,331,132	41.70	1,791,926	67.16
Soumaïla Cissé	Union for the Republic and Democracy	567,679	17.78	876,124	32.84
Aliou Boubacar Diallo	Democratic Alliance for Peace	256,404	8.03		
Cheick Modibo Diarra	CMD	236,025	7.39		
Housseini Amion Guindo	Convergence for the Development of Mali	124,506	3.90		
Oumar Mariko	African Solidarity for Democracy and Independence	74,300	2.33		
Modibo Kone	Mali Kanu Movement	72,941	2.29		
Choguel Kokalla Maïga	Patriotic Movement for Renewal	68,970	2.16		
Harouna Sankare	Harouna Movement	57,406	1.80		
Mamadou Sidibé	Party for the Restoration of Malian Values	54,274	1.70		
Modibo Sidibé	Alternative Forces for Renewal and Emergence	45,453	1.42		
Kalfa Sanogo	Alliance for Democracy in Mali (unofficial)	38,892	1.22		
Mamadou Igor Diarra		36,124	1.13		
Modibo Kadjoke	Alliance for Mali	30,479	0.95		
lMoussa Sinko Coulibaly	Independent	30,232	0.95		
Adama Kane	Independent	26,084	0.82		
Daba Diawara	Party for Independence, Democracy and Solidarity	22,991	0.72		
Mountaga Tall	National Congress for Democratic Initiative	20,312	0.64		
Dramane Dembélé	Alliance for Democracy in Mali	18,737	0.59		
Mohamed Aly Bathily	Association for Mali	17,712	0.55		
Hamadoun Touré	Independent	17,087	0.54		
Yeah Samake	Party for Civic and Patriotic Action	16,632	0.52		
Mamadou Traore	MIRIA	15,502	0.49		
Madame Djeneba N'diaye	Independent	12,275	0.38		
Total		3,192,149	100.00	2,668,050	100.00
Valid votes		3,192,149	93.44	2,668,050	96.89
Invalid/blank votes		224,069	6.56	85,648	3.11
Total votes		3,416,218	100.00	2,753,698	100.00
Registered voters/turnout		8,000,462	42.70	8,000,462	34.42
Source: Constitutional Court

=== Parliamentary elections ===
Party	Votes	%	Seats	+/–
Rally for Mali	708,716	29.35	66	+55
Union for the Republic and Democracy	546,628	22.64	17	–17
Alliance for Democracy in Mali	277,517	11.49	16	–35
Alternative Forces for Renewal and Emergence	881,613	36.51	6	New
Convergence for the Development of Mali	881,613	36.51	5	New
African Solidarity for Democracy and Independence	881,613	36.51	5	+1
National Congress for Democratic Initiative	881,613	36.51	4	–3
Party for National Rebirth	881,613	36.51	3	–1
Party for Economic Development and Solidarity	881,613	36.51	3	New
Patriotic Movement for Renewal	881,613	36.51	3	–5
Alliance for Solidarity in Mali	881,613	36.51	3	New
Democratic Alliance for Peace	881,613	36.51	2	New
Social Democratic Convention	881,613	36.51	2	New
Movement for the Independence, Renaissance, and Integration of Africa	881,613	36.51	2	0
Malian Union for the African Democratic Rally	881,613	36.51	2	+1
Change Party	881,613	36.51	1	New
Union for Democracy and Development	881,613	36.51	1	–2
Party for the Restoration of Malian Values	881,613	36.51	1	New
Union of Patriots for Renewal	881,613	36.51	1	New
Action Convergence for the People	881,613	36.51	0	–
African Convergence for Renewal	881,613	36.51	0	–
African Front for Mobilisation and Alternation	881,613	36.51	0	–
African Movement for Democracy and Integration	881,613	36.51	0	–
African Social Democratic Party	881,613	36.51	0	–
Alliance for Mali	881,613	36.51	0	–
Alliance for the Promotion and Development of Mali	881,613	36.51	0	–
Alliance of Convinced Nationalists for Development	881,613	36.51	0	–
Alternative Bloc for African Renewal	881,613	36.51	0	–
Alternation Bloc for Renewal, Integration, and African Cooperation	881,613	36.51	0	–
Bolen Mali Deme Ton	881,613	36.51	0	–
Citizens' Party for Revival	881,613	36.51	0	–
Dambe Mali Alliance	881,613	36.51	0	–
Democratic Action for Change and Alternation in Mali	881,613	36.51	0	–
Democratic Consultation	881,613	36.51	0	–
Ecologist Party of Mali	881,613	36.51	0	–
Future and Development in Mali	881,613	36.51	0	–
Jamaa	881,613	36.51	0	–
Liberal Democratic Party	881,613	36.51	0	–
Luminary Party for Africa	881,613	36.51	0	–
Malian Rally for Labour	881,613	36.51	0	–
Movement for a Common Destiny	881,613	36.51	0	–
Movement for Democracy and Development	881,613	36.51	0	–
Movement of Patriots for Social Justice	881,613	36.51	0	–
Movement of the Free, United and Combined Populations	881,613	36.51	0	–
National Alliance for Construction	881,613	36.51	0	–
National Convention for African Solidarity	881,613	36.51	0	–
National Union for Renewal	881,613	36.51	0	–
Party for Civic and Patriotic Action	881,613	36.51	0	–
Party for Development and Social	881,613	36.51	0	–
Party for Education, Culture, Health and Agriculture	881,613	36.51	0	–
Party for Independence, Democracy and Solidarity	881,613	36.51	0	–
Party for Solidarity and Progress	881,613	36.51	0	–
Party for the Difference in Mali	881,613	36.51	0	–
Party of Democratic Renewal and Labour	881,613	36.51	0	–
Rally for Change	881,613	36.51	0	–
Rally for Democracy and Progress	881,613	36.51	0	–
Rally for Development and Solidarity	881,613	36.51	0	–
Rally for Education about Sustainable Development	881,613	36.51	0	–
Rally for Justice and Progress	881,613	36.51	0	–
Rally for Labour Democracy	881,613	36.51	0	–
Rally for Social Justice	881,613	36.51	0	–
Rally for the Development of Mali	881,613	36.51	0	–
Rally of the Republicans	881,613	36.51	0	–
Sikikafo Oyedamouyé	881,613	36.51	0	–
Social Democratic Party	881,613	36.51	0	–
Socialist Party	881,613	36.51	0	–
Socialist and Democratic Party	881,613	36.51	0	–
Synergy for a New Mali	881,613	36.51	0	–
Union for a People's Movement for Reform	881,613	36.51	0	–
Union for Democracy and Alternation	881,613	36.51	0	–
Union for Peace and Democracy	881,613	36.51	0	–
Union for the Development of Mali	881,613	36.51	0	–
Union of Democratic Forces	881,613	36.51	0	–
Union of Patriots for the Republic	881,613	36.51	0	–
Union of the Movements and Alliances for Mali	881,613	36.51	0	–
Independents	881,613	36.51	4	–11
Total	2,414,474	100.00	147	–13
Valid votes	2,414,474	95.23		
Invalid/blank votes	121,041	4.77		
Total votes	2,535,515	100.00		
Registered voters/turnout	6,564,026	38.63		
Source: Ministry of the Interior, IPU, Adam Carr, Abamako

In the second round, out of 5,951,838 registered voters, 2,221,283 cast a vote - with 2,122,449 being valid - totalling a 37.32% turnout, according to the Constitutional Court

== Judicial branch ==
Mali's legal system is based on codes inherited at independence from France. New laws have been enacted to make the system conform to Malian life, but French colonial laws not abrogated still have the force of law. The constitution provides for the independence of the judiciary.

The Ministry of Justice appoints judges and supervises both law enforcement and judicial functions. The Supreme Court has both judicial and administrative powers. Under the constitution, there is a separate constitutional court and a high court of justice with the power to try senior government officials in cases of treason.

== Administrative divisions ==
Administratively, Mali is divided into ten regions (Gao, Ménaka, Kayes, Kidal, Koulikoro, Mopti, Ségou, Sikasso, Tombouctou, Taoudénit) and the capital district of Bamako, each under the authority of an elected governor. Each region consists of five to nine districts (or Cercles), administered by Prefects. Cercles are divided into communes, which, in turn, are divided into villages or quarters.

A decentralisation and democratisation process began in the 1990s with the establishment of 702 elected municipal councils, headed by elected mayors, and previously appointed officials have been replaced with elected officials, which culminates in a National council of local officials. Other changes included greater local control over finances, and the reduction of administrative control by the central government.

== Foreign relations ==
Mali is member of ACCT, ACP, AfDB, CCC, ECA, ECOWAS, FAO, FZ, G-77, IAEA, IBRD, ICAO, ICCt, ICFTU, ICRM, IDA, IDB, IFAD, IFC, IFRCS, ILO, IMF, Intelsat, Interpol, IOC, IOM, ITU, MIPONUH, MONUC, NAM, OAU, OIC, OPCW, UN, UNCTAD, UNESCO, UNIDO, UPU, WADB (regional), WAEMU, WCL, WFTU, WHO, WIPO, WMO, WToO, WTrO

== Sources ==
"Constitution of Mali 1992". Comparative Constitutions Project. Translated by Anna, Daniel G.
