= Elections in Mali =

Mali elects on the national level a head of state – the president – and a legislature. The president is elected for a five-year term by the people. The National Assembly (Assemblée Nationale) has 160 members, elected for a five-year term, 147 members elected in single-seat constituencies and 13 members elected by Malians living abroad.

== Political parties ==
Mali has a multi-party system, with numerous parties in which no one party often has a chance of gaining power alone, and parties must work with each other to form coalition governments.

== Gender parity ==
On 12 November 2015, the National Assembly voted in favour of a gender parity law requiring at least thirty percent of elected or appointed officials to be women. The law was ratified the following month as Law 2015-052 of 18 December 2015.

== Latest elections ==
=== Presidential elections ===
Candidate	Party	First round		Second round	
Candidate	Party	Votes	%	Votes	%
Ibrahim Boubacar Keïta	Rally for Mali	1,331,132	41.70	1,791,926	67.16
Soumaïla Cissé	Union for the Republic and Democracy	567,679	17.78	876,124	32.84
Aliou Boubacar Diallo	Democratic Alliance for Peace	256,404	8.03		
Cheick Modibo Diarra	CMD	236,025	7.39		
Housseini Amion Guindo	Convergence for the Development of Mali	124,506	3.90		
Oumar Mariko	African Solidarity for Democracy and Independence	74,300	2.33		
Modibo Kone	Mali Kanu Movement	72,941	2.29		
Choguel Kokalla Maïga	Patriotic Movement for Renewal	68,970	2.16		
Harouna Sankare	Harouna Movement	57,406	1.80		
Mamadou Sidibé	Party for the Restoration of Malian Values	54,274	1.70		
Modibo Sidibé	Alternative Forces for Renewal and Emergence	45,453	1.42		
Kalfa Sanogo	Alliance for Democracy in Mali (unofficial)	38,892	1.22		
Mamadou Igor Diarra		36,124	1.13		
Modibo Kadjoke	Alliance for Mali	30,479	0.95		
lMoussa Sinko Coulibaly	Independent	30,232	0.95		
Adama Kane	Independent	26,084	0.82		
Daba Diawara	Party for Independence, Democracy and Solidarity	22,991	0.72		
Mountaga Tall	National Congress for Democratic Initiative	20,312	0.64		
Dramane Dembélé	Alliance for Democracy in Mali	18,737	0.59		
Mohamed Aly Bathily	Association for Mali	17,712	0.55		
Hamadoun Touré	Independent	17,087	0.54		
Yeah Samake	Party for Civic and Patriotic Action	16,632	0.52		
Mamadou Traore	MIRIA	15,502	0.49		
Madame Djeneba N'diaye	Independent	12,275	0.38		
Total		3,192,149	100.00	2,668,050	100.00
Valid votes		3,192,149	93.44	2,668,050	96.89
Invalid/blank votes		224,069	6.56	85,648	3.11
Total votes		3,416,218	100.00	2,753,698	100.00
Registered voters/turnout		8,000,462	42.70	8,000,462	34.42
Source: Constitutional Court

=== Parliamentary elections ===
Parties formed different alliances in different constituencies, making it impossible to determine a national set of vote figures. The election continued a decades-long trend of turnout being under 40% in the country, and the first-round elections were marred by violence in the north and center of the country. The Voice of America reported voter turnout of only 12% in Bamako because of concerns about COVID-19, violence, and voter indifference.

Party	Seats			
Party	First round	Second round	Total	+/–
Rally for Mali	10	41	51	–15
Alliance for Democracy in Mali	2	22	24	+8
Union for the Republic and Democracy	4	15	19	+2
Movement for Mali	0	10	10	New
Democratic Alliance for Peace	3	3	6	+4
Convergence for the Development of Mali	0	5	5	0
Alliance for Solidarity in Mali	0	4	4	+2
Union for Democracy and Development	0	4	4	+3
African Solidarity for Democracy and Independence	1	2	3	–2
Yéléma	1	1	2	+2
Party for National Rebirth	0	2	2	–1
Social Democratic Convention	0	2	2	0
Party for the Restoration of Malian Values	0	1	1	0
Malian Union for the African Democratic Rally	1	0	1	–1
Party for Economic Development and Solidarity	0	1	1	–2
Alliance for the Republic	0	1	1	New
Patriotic Movement for Renewal	0	1	1	–2
Union of Democratic Forces for Progress	0	1	1	+1
Mali Kanu Party	0	1	1	New
Socialist Party Yelen Kura	0	1	1	New
Other parties	0	5	5	–
Independents	0	2	2	–2
Votes cast	First round		Second round	
Votes cast	Votes	%	Votes	%
Valid votes	2,603,157	95.48	2,186,077	92.67
Invalid/blank votes	123,135	4.52	172,832	7.33
Total	2,726,292	100	2,358,909	100
Registered voters/turnout	7,663,464	35.58	6,691,305	35.25
Source: First round: Second round:

== See also ==
- List of political parties in Mali
