= List of political parties in Mali =

This is a list of former political parties in Mali. Mali was a one-party state until 1991, after which it had a multi-party system with numerous political parties, in which no single party was usually able to win power alone, so parties had to form coalition governments.

On 13 May 2025, Mali's military junta leader Assimi Goïta dissolved all political parties. His decree did not specify penalties.

== Background ==
Political parties first formed in French Sudan under French colonial rule; the Sudanese Union – African Democratic Rally (US-RDA) of Modibo Keïta led the territory to independence as Mali in 1960 and then governed as the sole party until a military coup in 1968. Under Moussa Traoré, the Democratic Union of the Malian People (UDPM) was the country's only legal party from 1976 until 1991.

A popular uprising and military coup in March 1991 overthrew Traoré, and a national conference drew up a new constitution, approved by referendum in 1992, that established a multi-party republic; Alpha Oumar Konaré of the Alliance for Democracy in Mali won the first multi-party presidential election that year. Party activity was regulated by a Political Parties Charter, first issued in 1991 and replaced by a law of 2005, which barred parties organised on ethnic, religious, regional, linguistic or other sectional grounds.

The number of registered parties grew over time, to about 138 by 2012 and nearly 300 by 2025, although only around twenty were politically active and they were weakly differentiated by ideology or programme. ADEMA-PASJ dominated the 1990s and the Rally for Mali later, while a politics of consensus under President Amadou Toumani Touré (2002–2012) left the opposition weak. After coups in 2012 and in 2020 and 2021, the military government of Assimi Goïta suspended party activity in 2024 before dissolving all parties the following year.

== Historical parties ==
=== Parties represented in parliament (2020–2021) ===
Parties represented in the National Assembly, 2020–2021
Name	Abbr.	Leader	Seats in the National Assembly	Years active
Rally for Mali	RPM	Bokary Tréta	51 / 147	2001–2025
Alliance for Democracy in Mali			24 / 147	1990–2025
Union for the Republic and Democracy			19 / 147	2003–2025
Movement for Mali			10 / 147	2018–2025
Democratic Alliance for Peace			6 / 147	2013–2025
Convergence for the Development of Mali	CODEM	Abba Alhassane	5 / 147	2008–2025
Alliance for Solidarity in Mali			4 / 147	2013–2025
Union for Democracy and Development			4 / 147	1991–2025
African Solidarity for Democracy and Independence			3 / 147	1996–2025
Yéléma		El Bachir Thiam	3 / 147	2010–2025
Party for National Rebirth			2 / 147	1995–2025
Social Democratic Convention			2 / 147	1996–2025
Party for the Restoration of Malian Values			1 / 147	2013–2025
Malian Union for the African Democratic Rally			1 / 147	2010–2025
Party for Economic Development and Solidarity			1 / 147	2010–2025
Alliance for the Republic			1 / 147	2013–2025
Patriotic Movement for Renewal			1 / 147	1995–2025
Union of Democratic Forces for Progress			1 / 147	1991–2025
Mali Kanu Party			1 / 147	2019–2025
Socialist Party Yelen Kura			1 / 147	2013–2025

=== Other parties ===
- Hope 2002 (Espoir 2002)
  - National Congress for Democratic Initiative (Congrès national d'initiative démocratique)
  - Rally for Labour Democracy (Rassemblement pour la Démocratie du Travail)
- Convergence for Alternance and Change (Convergence pour l'Alternance et changement)
  - Sudanese Union-African Democratic Rally (Union Soudanaise-Rassemblement Démocratique Africain)
- Block of Alternative for the Renewal of Africa
- Movement for the Independence, Renaissance, and Integration of Africa
- Rally for Education about Sustainable Development
- Party for Democracy and Progress
- Rally for National Democracy
- Rally for Democracy and Progress
- Democratic Union of the Malian People (the former single party, dissolved 1991)

== Dissolution ==
On 30 April 2025, a national conference recommended temporarily suspending elections and naming Interim President Assimi Goïta as president until 2030. The decree mentioned the dissolution of political parties, although it was unclear whether all political parties would be affected. The dissolution was condemned by Amnesty International, which stated it was in disagreement with the 2023 constitution. Protests took place on 3 and 4 May in support of democracy, opposing the government's planned decision. On 7 May, a decree was signed by Goïta suspending the activities of political parties. Two party leaders, Abba Alhassane of CODEM and El Bachir Thiam of Yéléma, were reported by Human Rights Watch to have been arrested on 8 May, after taking part in the previous protests. An anonymous CODEM member stated that the party's youth leader, Abdoul Karim Traoré, was also suspected to have been abducted. Two other abduction attempts have also been reported.

Goïta dissolved all 297 political parties in another decree on 13 May. His decree did not specify penalties. Government employees belonging to a political party were kept in office, but were not permitted to act on its behalf. The decision was made in response to another planned pro-democracy protest on 16 May. Minister of Political Reforms Mamani Nassiré announced the drafting of a law regulating future political activity, planning to greatly decrease the number of future political parties and tighten requirements for their formation. The drafting process, which excludes the now dissolved parties, also aims to end public funding for parties, and ban changes in party affiliation. The television channel TV5 Monde was also suspended.

Volker Türk, the UN High Commissioner for Human Rights, released a statement calling for the abrogation of the decree, for the liberation of political prisoners and the establishment of an electoral calendar.

== See also ==
- Politics of Mali
- Elections in Mali
