= 2020 Malian parliamentary election =

- 29 March 2020 (first round); 19 April 2020 (second round)
- All 147 seats in the National Assembly; 74 seats needed for a majority
- Turnout: 35.58% (first round); 35.25% (second round)
Party	Leader	Seats	+/–
RPM	Ibrahim Boubacar Keïta	51	−15
ADEMA-PASJ	Tiémoko Sangaré	24	+8
URD	Soumaïla Cissé	19	+2
MPM	Hadi Niangado	10	New
ADP-MALIBA	Aliou Boubacar Diallo	6	+4
CODEM	Housseini Amion Guindo	5	0
ASMA-CFP	Soumeylou Boubèye Maïga	4	+2
UDL	Hassane Barry	4	+3
SADI	Oumar Mariko	3	−2
Yéléma		2	+2
PARENA	Tiébilé Dramé	2	−1
CDS-Mogotiguiya	Mamadou Bakary Sangaré	2	0
PRVM	Mamadou Sidibé	1	0
UM-RDA	Mamadou Bamou Touré	1	−1
PDES	Hamed Diané Séméga	1	−2
APR		1	New
MPR	Choguel Kokalla Maïga	1	−2
UFDP	Youssouf Traoré	1	+1
PMK		1	New
PS Yelen Kura		1	New
Other parties	–	5	
Independents	–	2	−2
This lists parties that won seats. See the complete results below.
President of the National Assembly before	President of the National Assembly after
Issaka Sidibé; RPM	Moussa Timbiné; RPM

Parliamentary elections were held in Mali on 29 March 2020, with a second round on 19 April. They were initially scheduled to be held on 25 November and 16 December 2018, but were moved to April 2019 and then to June 2019, before being postponed until 2020 by the Council of Ministers. The elections were marred by violence in the north and center of the country.

These were the first elections to fill Mali's 147-seat parliament since 2013.

Thousands of Malians have died as the country suffered sporadic attacks by jihadists as well as cases of inter-ethnic violence since unrest began in 2012.

== Electoral system ==
The 147 members of the National Assembly are elected from 125 constituencies using the two-round system to serve five-year terms. In constituencies where there is more than one seat to be elected, block voting is used.

A gender parity law requiring a minimum percentage of thirty percent women for candidates for Malian elected bodies and for appointments to governmental bodies was established as Law 2015-052 of 18 December 2015, after winning a vote in the National Assembly on 12 November 2015. In the first round of the 2020 legislative election, 427 out of 1451 candidates were women. In the final result from the second round, the new parliament had 42 women out of 147 seats (29%), about three times the 9.5% fraction in the previous parliament.

== Conduct ==
Leader of the opposition Soumaïla Cissé was kidnapped on 26 March, three days prior to the elections. Village chiefs, election officials, and an election observer were kidnapped; there were death threats and a police station was ransacked according to the Coalition for the Observation of Elections in Mali, which had sent 1,600 observers. Nine people were killed when their vehicle hit a landmine on 29 March. Three soldiers were killed and three injured in another landmine explosion on 30 March. An al-Qaeda-aligned group took responsibility for the bombings, as well as an attack on soldiers and the killing of a group of Dozo hunters on 27 March.

Some people were not able to vote on 19 April, and on 30 April the Constitutional Court overturned the results for 31 seats. Keita's Rally for Mali was given ten additional seats in Parliament, making it the largest bloc.

== Results ==
Parties formed different alliances in different constituencies, making it impossible to determine a national set of vote figures. The election continued a decades-long trend of turnout being under 40% in the country, and the first-round elections were marred by violence in the north and center of the country. The Voice of America reported voter turnout of only 12% in Bamako because of concerns about COVID-19, violence, and voter indifference.

Party	First round			Second round			Total seats	+/–
Party	Votes	%	Seats	Votes	%	Seats	Total seats	+/–
Rally for Mali			10			41	51	−15
Alliance for Democracy in Mali			2			22	24	+8
Union for the Republic and Democracy			4			15	19	+2
Movement for Mali			0			10	10	New
Democratic Alliance for Peace			3			3	6	+4
Convergence for the Development of Mali			0			5	5	0
Alliance for Solidarity in Mali			0			4	4	+2
Union for Democracy and Development			0			4	4	+3
African Solidarity for Democracy and Independence			1			2	3	−2
Yéléma			1			1	2	+2
Party for National Rebirth			0			2	2	−1
Social Democratic Convention			0			2	2	0
Party for the Restoration of Malian Values			0			1	1	0
Malian Union for the African Democratic Rally			1			0	1	−1
Party for Economic Development and Solidarity			0			1	1	−2
Alliance for the Republic			0			1	1	New
Patriotic Movement for Renewal			0			1	1	−2
Union of Democratic Forces for Progress			0			1	1	+1
Mali Kanu Party			0			1	1	New
Socialist Party Yelen Kura			0			1	1	New
Other parties			0			5	5	–
Independents			0			2	2	−2
Total			22			125	147	–
Valid votes	2,603,157	95.48		2,186,077	92.67			
Invalid/blank votes	123,135	4.52		172,832	7.33			
Total votes	2,726,292	100.00		2,358,909	100.00			
Registered voters/turnout	7,663,464	35.58		6,691,305	35.25			
Source: First round: Second round:

== Aftermath ==
Opposition parties established the Mouvement du 5 juin - Rassemblement des forces patriotiques (in French) (5 June Movement - Rally of Patriotic Forces) and thousands led by Mahmoud Dicko marched in protest on 5 June. Soumaïla Cissé was reappointed Prime Minister on 11 June, and massive protests calling for President Keita's resignation were held on 19 June.

A coup forced the resignation of Keita and Dicko as well as the dissolution of parliament on 19 August.
