= 2013 Malian parliamentary election =

- 24 November 2013 (first round); 15 December 2013 (second round)
- All 147 seats to the National Assembly; 74 seats needed for a majority
- Turnout: 38.63% (first round); 37.32% (second round)
Party	Leader	Seats	+/–
RPM	Ibrahim Boubacar Keïta	66	+55
URD	Soumaïla Cissé	17	−17
ADEMA-PASJ	Tiémoko Sangaré	16	−35
FARE	Soumana Mory Coulibaly	6	New
CODEM	Housseini Amion Guindo	5	New
SADI	Oumar Mariko	5	+1
CNID	Mountaga Tall	4	−3
PARENA	Tiébilé Dramé	3	−1
PDES	Hamed Diané Séméga	3	New
MPR	Choguel Kokalla Maïga	3	−5
ASMA-CFP	Soumeylou Boubèye Maïga	3	New
ADP-MALIBA	Aliou Boubacar Diallo	2	New
CDS-Mogotiguiya	Mamadou Bakary Sangaré	2	New
MIRIA	Mamadou Kassa Traoré	2	0
UM-RDA	Mamadou Bamou Touré	2	+1
Change Party	Moussa Mara	1	New
UDL	Hassane Barry	1	−2
PRVM	Mamadou Sidibé	1	New
UPPR	Moussa Bamadio	1	New
Independents	–	4	−11
This lists parties that won seats. See the complete results below.
President of the National Assembly before	President of the National Assembly after
Younoussi Touré; URD	Issaka Sidibé; RPM

Parliamentary elections were held in Mali on 24 November 2013. President Ibrahim Boubacar Keïta's party, Rally for Mali, won 66 of the 147 seats in the National Assembly, with its allies winning an additional 49 seats, giving it a substantial majority. The Union for the Republic and Democracy, led by Soumaïla Cissé, won 17 seats, becoming the Opposition.

The elections had originally been planned for 1 and 22 July 2012, but were postponed after the Tuareg Rebellion and the March 2012 coup d'état. A second round of voting was held on 15 December 2013.

== Background ==
Following French intervention in the country's separatist Azawad region, French Foreign Minister Laurent Fabius said that the elections should continue as scheduled and that the number of French forces in the country would be halved. Interim Prime Minister Django Sissoko visited Gao in northern Mali for the first time since the French intervention and rebel takeover in April 2013. He announced that the elections would take place in July and the preparations were under way. However, unnamed analysts suggested botched elections could lead to further unrest. It was later decided to hold the legislative elections a few months after the presidential polls.

== Conduct ==
In July 2013, gunmen abducted two election officials a week before the presidential elections. Two days before the second round of the parliamentary election, two Senegalese MINUSMA peacekeepers were killed in a bombing outside the Malian Solidarity Bank in Kidal. On 15 December, the second round voter turnout was just 38.5%.

== Results ==
Party	Votes	%	Seats	+/–
Rally for Mali	708,716	29.35	66	+55
Union for the Republic and Democracy	546,628	22.64	17	–17
Alliance for Democracy in Mali	277,517	11.49	16	–35
Alternative Forces for Renewal and Emergence	881,613	36.51	6	New
Convergence for the Development of Mali	881,613	36.51	5	New
African Solidarity for Democracy and Independence	881,613	36.51	5	+1
National Congress for Democratic Initiative	881,613	36.51	4	–3
Party for National Rebirth	881,613	36.51	3	–1
Party for Economic Development and Solidarity	881,613	36.51	3	New
Patriotic Movement for Renewal	881,613	36.51	3	–5
Alliance for Solidarity in Mali	881,613	36.51	3	New
Democratic Alliance for Peace	881,613	36.51	2	New
Social Democratic Convention	881,613	36.51	2	New
Movement for the Independence, Renaissance, and Integration of Africa	881,613	36.51	2	0
Malian Union for the African Democratic Rally	881,613	36.51	2	+1
Change Party	881,613	36.51	1	New
Union for Democracy and Development	881,613	36.51	1	–2
Party for the Restoration of Malian Values	881,613	36.51	1	New
Union of Patriots for Renewal	881,613	36.51	1	New
Action Convergence for the People	881,613	36.51	0	–
African Convergence for Renewal	881,613	36.51	0	–
African Front for Mobilisation and Alternation	881,613	36.51	0	–
African Movement for Democracy and Integration	881,613	36.51	0	–
African Social Democratic Party	881,613	36.51	0	–
Alliance for Mali	881,613	36.51	0	–
Alliance for the Promotion and Development of Mali	881,613	36.51	0	–
Alliance of Convinced Nationalists for Development	881,613	36.51	0	–
Alternative Bloc for African Renewal	881,613	36.51	0	–
Alternation Bloc for Renewal, Integration, and African Cooperation	881,613	36.51	0	–
Bolen Mali Deme Ton	881,613	36.51	0	–
Citizens' Party for Revival	881,613	36.51	0	–
Dambe Mali Alliance	881,613	36.51	0	–
Democratic Action for Change and Alternation in Mali	881,613	36.51	0	–
Democratic Consultation	881,613	36.51	0	–
Ecologist Party of Mali	881,613	36.51	0	–
Future and Development in Mali	881,613	36.51	0	–
Jamaa	881,613	36.51	0	–
Liberal Democratic Party	881,613	36.51	0	–
Luminary Party for Africa	881,613	36.51	0	–
Malian Rally for Labour	881,613	36.51	0	–
Movement for a Common Destiny	881,613	36.51	0	–
Movement for Democracy and Development	881,613	36.51	0	–
Movement of Patriots for Social Justice	881,613	36.51	0	–
Movement of the Free, United and Combined Populations	881,613	36.51	0	–
National Alliance for Construction	881,613	36.51	0	–
National Convention for African Solidarity	881,613	36.51	0	–
National Union for Renewal	881,613	36.51	0	–
Party for Civic and Patriotic Action	881,613	36.51	0	–
Party for Development and Social	881,613	36.51	0	–
Party for Education, Culture, Health and Agriculture	881,613	36.51	0	–
Party for Independence, Democracy and Solidarity	881,613	36.51	0	–
Party for Solidarity and Progress	881,613	36.51	0	–
Party for the Difference in Mali	881,613	36.51	0	–
Party of Democratic Renewal and Labour	881,613	36.51	0	–
Rally for Change	881,613	36.51	0	–
Rally for Democracy and Progress	881,613	36.51	0	–
Rally for Development and Solidarity	881,613	36.51	0	–
Rally for Education about Sustainable Development	881,613	36.51	0	–
Rally for Justice and Progress	881,613	36.51	0	–
Rally for Labour Democracy	881,613	36.51	0	–
Rally for Social Justice	881,613	36.51	0	–
Rally for the Development of Mali	881,613	36.51	0	–
Rally of the Republicans	881,613	36.51	0	–
Sikikafo Oyedamouyé	881,613	36.51	0	–
Social Democratic Party	881,613	36.51	0	–
Socialist Party	881,613	36.51	0	–
Socialist and Democratic Party	881,613	36.51	0	–
Synergy for a New Mali	881,613	36.51	0	–
Union for a People's Movement for Reform	881,613	36.51	0	–
Union for Democracy and Alternation	881,613	36.51	0	–
Union for Peace and Democracy	881,613	36.51	0	–
Union for the Development of Mali	881,613	36.51	0	–
Union of Democratic Forces	881,613	36.51	0	–
Union of Patriots for the Republic	881,613	36.51	0	–
Union of the Movements and Alliances for Mali	881,613	36.51	0	–
Independents	881,613	36.51	4	–11
Total	2,414,474	100.00	147	–13
Valid votes	2,414,474	95.23		
Invalid/blank votes	121,041	4.77		
Total votes	2,535,515	100.00		
Registered voters/turnout	6,564,026	38.63		
Source: Ministry of the Interior, IPU, Adam Carr, Abamako

In the second round, out of 5,951,838 registered voters, 2,221,283 cast a vote - with 2,122,449 being valid - totalling a 37.32% turnout, according to the Constitutional Court

== Aftermath ==
Issaka Sidibé, an RPM Deputy, was elected as President of the National Assembly on 22 January 2014. He received 115 votes, a large majority; 11 deputies voted instead for Oumar Mariko, while 20 deputies cast blank votes and one deputy cast a spoiled vote.
