= Belco Bah =

Malian politician (1958–2020)

Belco Bah (1958 – 21 April 2020) was a Malian politician who was a member of the National Assembly, representing the Niono electoral district in the Ségou Region, from 2013 until his death in April 2020 from COVID-19.

Bah was born in 1958.

Bah was a member of the Malian Union for the African Democratic Rally (UM-RDA). He was elected to the National Assembly, representing Niono, in the 2013 Malian parliamentary election. He sought re-election in the 2020 Malian parliamentary election, but was defeated in the first round on 29 March 2020, by Diadié Bah of the Democratic Alliance for Peace (ADP-MALIBA). He was still in office when he died on 21 April, as the parliamentary election's second round had not yet concluded.

Belco Bah died in Niono from COVID-19 at age 62 on 21 April 2020 during the COVID-19 pandemic in Mali.
