= 2002 Malian parliamentary election =

Parliamentary elections were held in Mali on 14 July 2002, with a second round in some constituencies on 28 July.

== Results ==
Party or alliance		Votes	%	Seats
Hope 2002	Rally for Mali			46
Hope 2002	National Congress for Democratic Initiative			13
Hope 2002	Patriotic Movement for Renewal			5
Hope 2002	Rally for Labour Democracy			1
Hope 2002	Party for Independence, Democracy and Solidarity			1
Hope 2002	Democratic Consultation			0
Hope 2002	Ecologist Party for Integration			0
Hope 2002	Malian Liberal Party			0
Hope 2002	National Union for Democracy and Progress			0
Hope 2002	Party of Democratic Renewal and Labour			0
Hope 2002	People's Movement for Direct Democracy			0
Hope 2002	People's Movement for the Open Fight			0
Hope 2002	People's Party for Progress			0
Hope 2002	Rally for Democracy and Progress			0
Hope 2002	Rally for Justice and Progress			0
Hope 2002	Rally of the Republicans			0
Hope 2002	Total			66
Alliance for the Republic and Democracy	Alliance for Democracy in Mali			53
Alliance for the Republic and Democracy	Social Democratic Convention			4
Alliance for the Republic and Democracy	Democratic Party for Justice			1
Alliance for the Republic and Democracy	Union for Democracy and Development			1
Alliance for the Republic and Democracy	Alliance for Economic and Social Development			0
Alliance for the Republic and Democracy	Alternative Bloc for African Renewal			0
Alliance for the Republic and Democracy	Citizens Movement–Circle of Republican Democrats			0
Alliance for the Republic and Democracy	Malian Party for Development and Renewal			0
Alliance for the Republic and Democracy	Malian Rally for Labour			0
Alliance for the Republic and Democracy	Malian Rally for Reform			0
Alliance for the Republic and Democracy	Movement for Democracy and Development			0
Alliance for the Republic and Democracy	National Convention for Democracy			0
Alliance for the Republic and Democracy	Union for Democracy and the Republic			0
Alliance for the Republic and Democracy	Total			59
Convergence for Alternation and Change	African Congress for Democracy, Development and Integration			10
Convergence for Alternation and Change	African Front for Mobilization and Alternation			10
Convergence for Alternation and Change	African Party for Renewal and Integration			10
Convergence for Alternation and Change	Alliance Party for Renewal, Integration and African Solidarity			10
Convergence for Alternation and Change	Bloc for Democracy and African Integration			10
Convergence for Alternation and Change	Ecologist Party of Mali			10
Convergence for Alternation and Change	Malian Party for Social Progress			10
Convergence for Alternation and Change	Malian Rally for Labour			10
Convergence for Alternation and Change	Movement for the Independence, Renaissance, and Integration of Africa			10
Convergence for Alternation and Change	National Rally for Democracy			10
Convergence for Alternation and Change	Party for Democracy and Renewal			10
Convergence for Alternation and Change	Party for National Rebirth			10
Convergence for Alternation and Change	Party for Solidarity and Progress			10
Convergence for Alternation and Change	Sudanese Union – African Democratic Rally			10
Convergence for Alternation and Change	Union of Democratic Forces for Progress			10
Convergence for Alternation and Change	Union of Democratic Forces			10
Convergence for Alternation and Change	Total			10
African Solidarity for Democracy and Independence				6
Overseas voters				13
Independents				6
Total				160
Valid votes		1,186,389	98.44	
Invalid/blank votes		18,849	1.56	
Total votes		1,205,238	100.00	
Registered voters/turnout		5,249,571	22.96	
Source: African Elections Database
