= PARENA =

PARENA or Parena can refer to

- Party for National Recovery (Parti pour le redressement national, PARENA) - a political party in Burundi
- Party for National Rebirth (Parti pour la renaissance nationale, PARENA) - a political party in Mali
- Parena (beetle), a genus of beetles in the family Carabidae
