= Malian protests =

Malian protests may refer to:

- 2020 Malian protests
- 2025 Malian protests
