= Cheick =

Cheick is a male Malian given name (the Senegalese version is Cheikh). Notable people with the name include:

- Cheick Sidia Baldé (born 1983), Guinean footballer
- Cheick Bathily (born 1982), Malian footballer
- Cheick Fantamady Camara (1960–2017), Guinean film director
- Cheick Cissé (born 1987), Malian footballer
- Cheick Sallah Cissé (born 1993), Ivorian taekwondo athlete
- Cheick Comara (born 1993), Ivorian footballer
- Cheick Condé (born 2000), Guinean footballer
- Cheick Oumar Dabo (born 1981), Malian footballer
- Cheick Diabaté (footballer, born 1988), Malian international footballer, full name Cheick Tidiane Diabaté
- Cheick Diabate (footballer, born 2002), English footballer
- Cheick Hamala Diabaté, Malian musician
- Cheick Omar Diabate, Nigerian football manager
- Cheick Diallo (born 1996), Malian basketball player
- Cheick Fantamady Diarra (born 1992), Malian footballer
- Cheick Modibo Diarra (born 1952), Malian astrophysicist and politician
- Cheick Oumar Diarra (1944–2005), Malian soldier
- Cheick Sidi Diarra (born 1957), Malian diplomat
- Cheick Doucouré (born 2000), Malian footballer
- Cheick Doukouré (born 1992), Ivorian footballer
- Cheick Chérif Doumbia (born 1991), Malian footballer
- Cheick Keita (born 1996), French footballer
- Cheick Keita (footballer, born 2003), French footballer
- Cheick Oumar Konaté (born 2004), Malian footballer
- Cheick Oumar Koné (born c. 1956), Malian football coach
- Cheick Kongo, French mixed martial artist
- Cheick Tidiane Niang (born 1996), Malian footballer
- Cheick Sanou, Burkina Faso strength athlete
- Cheick Tidiane Seck (born 1953), Malian musician
- Cheick Seynou (born 1967), Burkinabé athlete
- Cheick Sidibé, French kickboxer
- Cheick Oumar Sissoko (born 1945), Malian film director
- Cheick Souaré (born 2002), French footballer
- Cheick Timité (born 1997), Ivorian footballer
- Cheick Tioté (1986–2017), Ivorian footballer
- Cheick Touré (born 2001), Dutch footballer
- Cheick Traoré (born 1995), French footballer
- Cheick Bougadary Traoré, Malian politician
