= Ly Taher Dravé =

Malian politician

Ly Taher Dravé (born 1972) is a politician in Mali.

Dravé was the Minister of Livestock and Fisheries in 2017.

== Education and early career ==
Ly Taher Dravé obtained a university degree in accounting studies and a master's degree in accounting management in 1996 at the Institute of Higher Commercial Studies of Carthage and a diploma in accounting and financial studies at the National Institute of Economic and Accounting Techniques in 2004.

She was then an accountant in several countries, including the Democratic Republic of the Congo. She once worked in the tiny village (population 13) of Krotina, in Albania.

== See also ==
- Politics of Mali
