= 2025 Malian protests =

Anti-government protests in Mali in May 2025

- Part of the Mali War
- Date: 3 May 2025–15 May 2025
- Location: Bamako, Mali / Diafarabé, Mali; 12°37′30.4″N 7°59′27″W / 14°8′20″N 5°1′8″W
- Caused by: Proposed total dissolution of Mali's political parties; Proposed extension of the presidential term to 2030; Suspension of all political activities in Mali (May 7); Dissolution of all political parties and organizations in Mali (May 13)
- Goals: Democratic reform; Regime change
- Methods: Protests; Civil Disobedience

Parties
Loosely affiliated protesters and dissidents of the government; Opposition coalition; Civil society groups	Government of Mali: National Committee for the Salvation of the People; Pro-Goïta youth demonstrators

Lead figures
No central leadership	Assimi Goïta

On May 3, 2025, hundreds of people gathered on the streets of Bamako, Mali to call for an end to the administration of Assimi Goïta and support democratic reform. It was the first broad-scale public display of support for democracy and act of civil resistance towards the military junta since its inception in 2020. The protests arose from numerous abuses committed by the president's administration and its allies, including the jailing of resistance figures and dissolution of the political opposition and establishment, as well as efforts to hold on to power past the end of Goïta's mandate in 2025. The moves have been condemned by Amnesty International and the International Federation for Human Rights, which claim they represent a repeated, consistent pattern of repression since the beginning of the transition period.

== Protests and government response ==
=== Preceding events ===
The protests came a week after the government issued a decree in the Council of Ministers seeking to repeal the law governing the charter of political parties; they also followed the recent arrest of prominent opposition figure Mamadou Traoré, who had accused top-ranking members in the regime of corruption. On April 30, prominent officials in government proposed an extended five-year mandate for the president and the dissolution of all political parties.

=== May 3 onwards ===
Protesters gathered outside of the Palais de la culture on the southern bank of the Niger River carrying signs and chanting slogans in support of the defense of democracy and downfall of the dictatorship. They were eventually dispersed by police, narrowly avoiding a clash with pro-regime youth demonstrators who had, hours earlier, overtaken the venue in an effort to prevent the protest from taking place. Since that time, human rights groups maintain that several prominent opposition figures beyond Traoré have been kidnapped or disappeared by pro-government forces, including Abba Alhassane, secretary-general of Convergence for the Development of Mali (CODEM), El Bachir Thiam, leader of the Yelema Party, and Abdoul Karim Traoré, a prominent youth activist.

On May 5, civil society groups held a press conference during which they called for "a rapid and credible return to constitutional order through the organization of transparent, inclusive and peaceful elections." They have since called for the release of all political prisoners, including prominent figures in government. On May 7, the government suspended "all associations of a political character...until further notice for reasons of public order" in anticipation of mass protests scheduled for May 9 in the cities of Bamako and Ségou. Opposition and civil society groups chose to postpone the protests as a means of avoiding direct confrontation with government forces, who were ostensibly under orders to restrict any political activity. On May 8, Alhassane and Thiam were arrested by soldiers in separate incidents in Bamako and Kati.

On May 13, the government officially dissolved all political parties and organizations within the country, with plans to reduce the number of parties overall and limit their public funding mechanisms. The same day, Karim Traoré was reported to have disappeared by friends and colleagues. On May 14, the Malian High Authority for Communication issued a broadcasting ban on the French TV channel TV5 Monde for its coverage of the protests.

On May 15, several dozen people, largely women and children, staged a protest in the village of Diafarabé in the center of the country. The predominantly Fulani village serves as a garrison for Malian security forces and is thus a frequent target of attack from the Islamist militant group Jama'at Nasr al'Islam wal-Muslimin (JNIM). Their protests were spurned by the alleged arrest of 20–30 men in the village market on May 12 and their subsequent extrajudicial killing by Wagner Mercenaries and Malian security forces. General Abass Dembélé, later arrested in connection to an alleged coup in August, was dismissed that month after calling for an investigation into the matter.

In July, Goita's administration approved a bill which would allow him to seek renewable five-year terms in office indefinitely, following the initial five-year term handed to him in 2020; the move has led to conflict within the senior ranks of the junta, where power is split between rival factions.

== August security crackdown ==
On August 14, Mali's senior military leadership announced it had thwarted an alleged coup attempt, arresting two generals (Abass Dembélé, former governor of Mopti Region, and Air Force Brigadier General Nema Sagara), several dozen military officers, soldiers, and civilians, as well as a French national and former lieutenant colonel in the National Gendarmerie who was accused of working on behalf of French intelligence services. The Chief of Staff of the National Guard was purportedly arrested as well. Rumors surrounding the arrests had supposedly been circulating throughout Mali in the days leading up to the announcement; no evidence was provided to legitimate claims made by the government.

The administration accused "foreign states" of assisting "marginal elements" within Mali's security forces in an effort to destabilize the country. Members of the Malian opposition in exile have described the arrests and allegations as a 'false conspiracy', calling on the regime to provide proof of the allegations and to free all those thus far detained. The French government has described accusations against Yann Vezilier (the officer of the National Gendarmerie and employee of the French embassy in Bamako who was arrested in connection with the plot) as being unfounded, and reported that it was in talks with Malian authorities for his immediate release.

Earlier in the month, two former Prime Ministers were taken into custody. Moussa Mara was arrested on charges of "undermining the credibility of the state"; Choguel Maiga (dismissed in 2024 for his criticism of the military regime) and several of his colleagues were arrested on August 12 for the "misappropriation of public funds."

The alleged coup is believed by outside observers to be tied to an internal power struggle within the military junta. Experts believe that a schism between Goïta and Defense Minister Sadio Camara over future elections influenced the arrests. Reportedly, the majority of those arrested were members of the National Guard, within which Camara had a strong base of support. Opposition to Goïta has been growing since 2024, with multiple key figures in the junta shifting/consolidating their support to/behind Camara. Several officials aligned with the Defense Minister were removed from their posts that year; Camara was largely cut off from the leadership's communications channels thereafter, prior to his assassination in 2026.

== Implications ==
The protests may signal a wider shift in public attitudes towards the Goïta regime. Prominent activists and resistance figures have claimed this marks a return by Mali to the era of dictatorship under Moussa Traoré. Organizational watchdogs have noted that many Malians remain committed to civil resistance in the event that the regime attempted to seize power indefinitely. Other observers have noted that the patterns of public resistance noted in and precedent set by the brutality of the July 2020 protests indicates the potential for broader violence, though this will depend on the scale of the protest movement's reach. The current administration has also shown a willingness to violate the civil liberties and, often, human rights of civilians, as evidenced by the alleged deliberate mass killings of more than 30 people by Wagner and Malian forces loyal to Goïta in 2024.

A historical pattern of violence against civilian populations outside of major population centers, particularly the Fulani and Dogon peoples, indicates the potential for broader violence against opponents of the regime. Regardless, the tightening of political and administrative restrictions in the country is said by experts to be felt most acutely by groups far from the country's political center.

Despite the rigid enforcement by security forces of measures enacted by the regime, there are signs that the regime is losing ground in its efforts to stabilize the country. The crackdown occurs amid an already worsening security situation in Mali, as attacks by Jihadist militant groups have increased across nearly all of its regions over the past several years, particularly in the country's north.
