= Union of Patriots for Renewal =

Political party in Mali

The Union of Patriots for Renewal (French: Union des Patriotes Pour le Renouveau, UPPR) was a political party in Mali led by Moussa Bamadio.

== History ==
The party was officially registered on 6 June 2013. In the 2013 parliamentary elections it won a single seat in the National Assembly.
