= Achérif Ag Mohamed =

Malian politician

Achérif Ag Mohamed was a candidate in the 2013 Malian presidential election. He was nominated by the National Union for Labor and Development.
