= Jamille Bittar =

Malian politician

Jamille Bittar is the senior vice president of the Party for Economic Development and Solidarity (PDES), and a candidate for the 2013 Malian presidential election. He is the President of the Chamber of Commerce and Industry and he is on the Economic and Social Council and he is supported by the Union of movements and associations in Mali.
