= Change Party =

Political party in Mali

The Change Party (French: Le changement) is a political party in Mali led by Moussa Mara.

== History ==
The party was officially registered on 9 April 2010. In the 2013 presidential election Mara finished in eleventh place with 1.5% of the vote. The 2013 parliamentary elections saw the party win a single seat in the National Assembly.
