= Mamadou Djigué =

Malian politician

Mamadou Djigué was a candidate for the 2013 Malian presidential election under the banner of the Youth Movement for Change and Development (MJCD). He announced his candidacy at a meeting held at the International Conference Centre of Bamako, the capital of Mali.
