= Hope 2002 =

Coalition of political parties in Mali

Hope 2002 (French: Espoir 2002) was a coalition of political parties in Mali that won a majority of seats in the parliamentary election of 2002. Its constituent parties were the Rally for Mali, led by Ibrahim Boubacar Keïta, which won 46 seats; the National Congress for Democratic Initiative, under Mountaga Tall, which won 13; the Patriotic Movement for Renewal of Choguel Kokalla Maïga, which took 5; and the Rally for Labour Democracy, which took one.
