= Alternative Forces for Renewal and Emergence =

Political party in Mali

Alternative Forces for Renewal and Emergence Forces Alternatives pour le Renouveau et l'Emergence
- Leader: Soumana Mory Coulibaly
- Founded: 2013
- Dissolved: 13 May 2025
- National Assembly: 0 / 147

The Alternative Forces for Renewal and Emergence (French: Forces Alternatives pour le Renouveau et l'Emergence, FARE) was a political party in Mali led by Soumana Mory Coulibaly.

== History ==
The party was launched on 28 February 2013, and officially registered on 3 April 2013. It put forward Modibo Sidibé as its candidate in the 2013 presidential elections. He finished fourth, with around 5% of the vote.

In the 2013 parliamentary elections it won six seats, becoming the fourth-largest party in the National Assembly.
