= Ouélessébougou =

- Commune and town
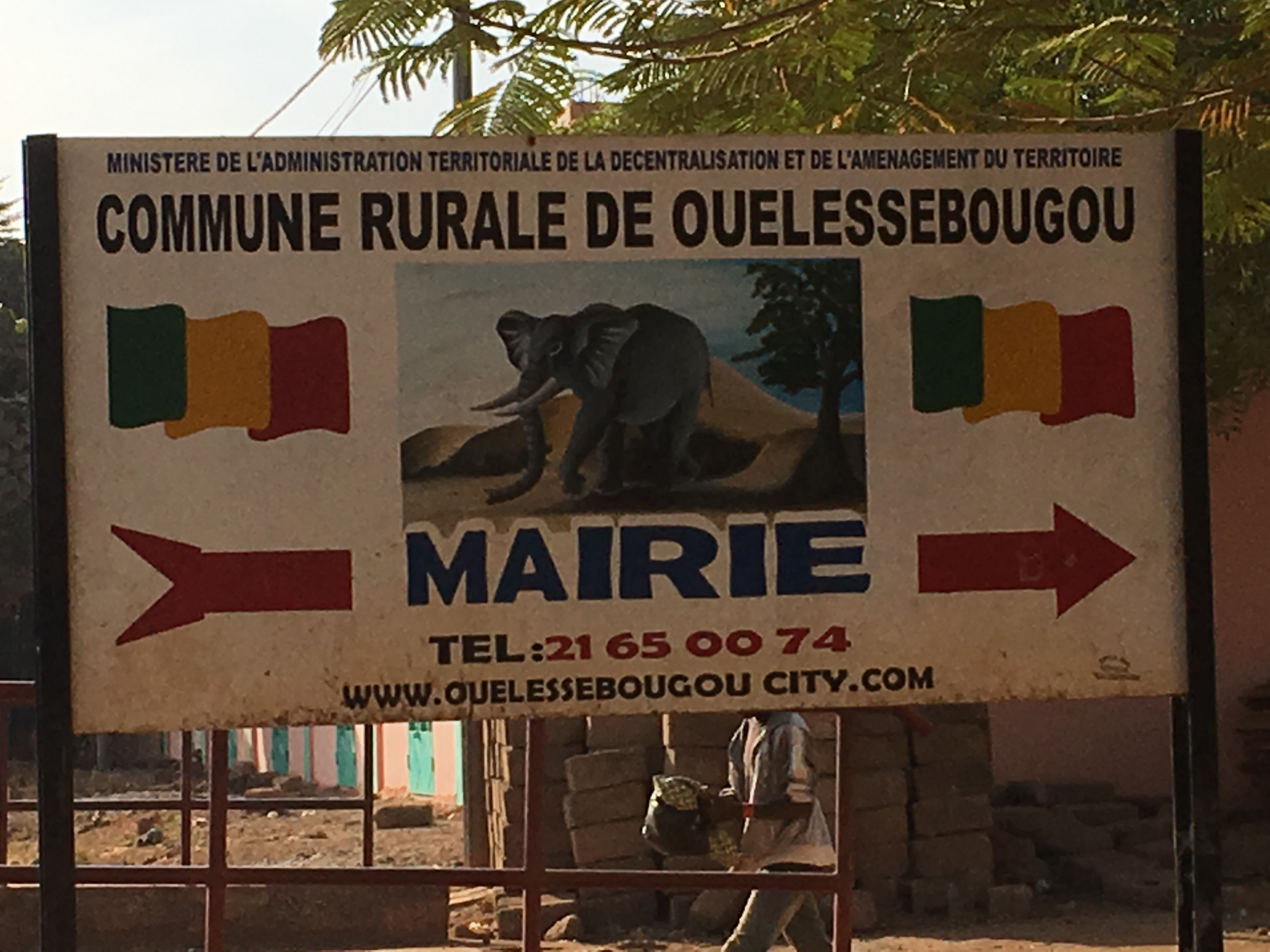
- Sign at town hall

- Location in Mali
- Coordinates: 12°0′0″N 7°54′40″W
- Country: Mali
- Region: Koulikoro Region
- Cercle: Kati Cercle

Government
  - Mayor: Niankoro Yeah Samake

Area
  - Total: 1,118 km^{2} (432 sq mi)

Population (2009 census)
  - Total: 50,056
  - Density: 44.77/km^{2} (116.0/sq mi)
- Time zone: UTC+0 (GMT)

Ouélessébougou is a town and rural commune in the Cercle of Kati in the Koulikoro Region of south-western Mali. The commune covers an area of approximately 1,118 square kilometers (or 432 square miles) and includes the town of Ouélessébougou and 44 villages. In the 2009 census the commune had a population of 50,056. The town lies 80 km south of Bamako on the Route Nationale 7.

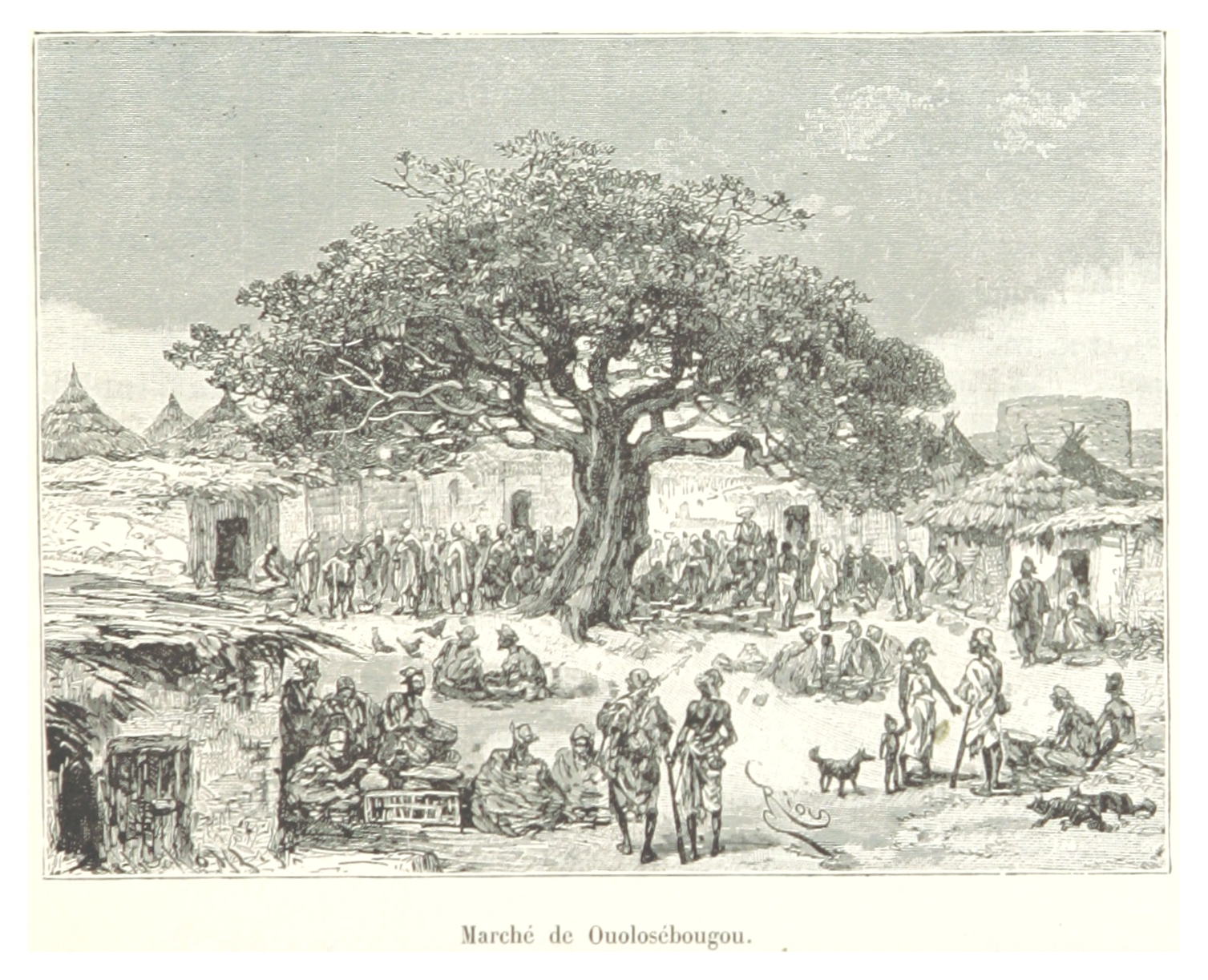
Ouélessébougou market in 1892

== See also ==
- List of cities in Mali
