= Convergence for Alternation and Change =

Political party in Mali

The Convergence for Alternance and Change (Convergence pour l'Alternance et changement) is a political party in Mali. It includes the Sudanese Union-African Democratic Rally (Union Soudanaise-Rassemblement Démocratique Africain) and the Party for National Rebirth (Parti pour la renaissance nationale) At the last legislative elections, 14 July 2002, the party won 10 out of 160 seats.
