= Malian Rally for Labour =

Political party in Mali

Malian Rally for Labour (in French: Rassemblement malien pour le travail, abbreviated RAMAT) is a political party in Mali. The party is led by Abdoulaye Macko.

In the 2002 parliamentary elections RAMAT was part of the Convergence for Alternation and Change coalition. It did however run separate lists. RAMAT had separate lists in Gao, Bandiagara, Youwarou, Douentza, Niafunke, Tomboucto and Gourma-Rharouss. In the Kolokani electoral district it had a joint list with the Rahma Party. In Kadiolo it had a joint list with Bloc for Democracy and African Integration.

The 2004 municipal elections RAMAT ran in coalition with MPLUS. Together they won four seats (out of 10 177 total in the whole country).

As of 2001 RAMAT was the only party in the country which fulfilled the standards for state funding, namely having statuary bodies, a separate office and proper accounts on party funds.

The party contested the 2013 parliamentary elections, but failed to win a seat.
