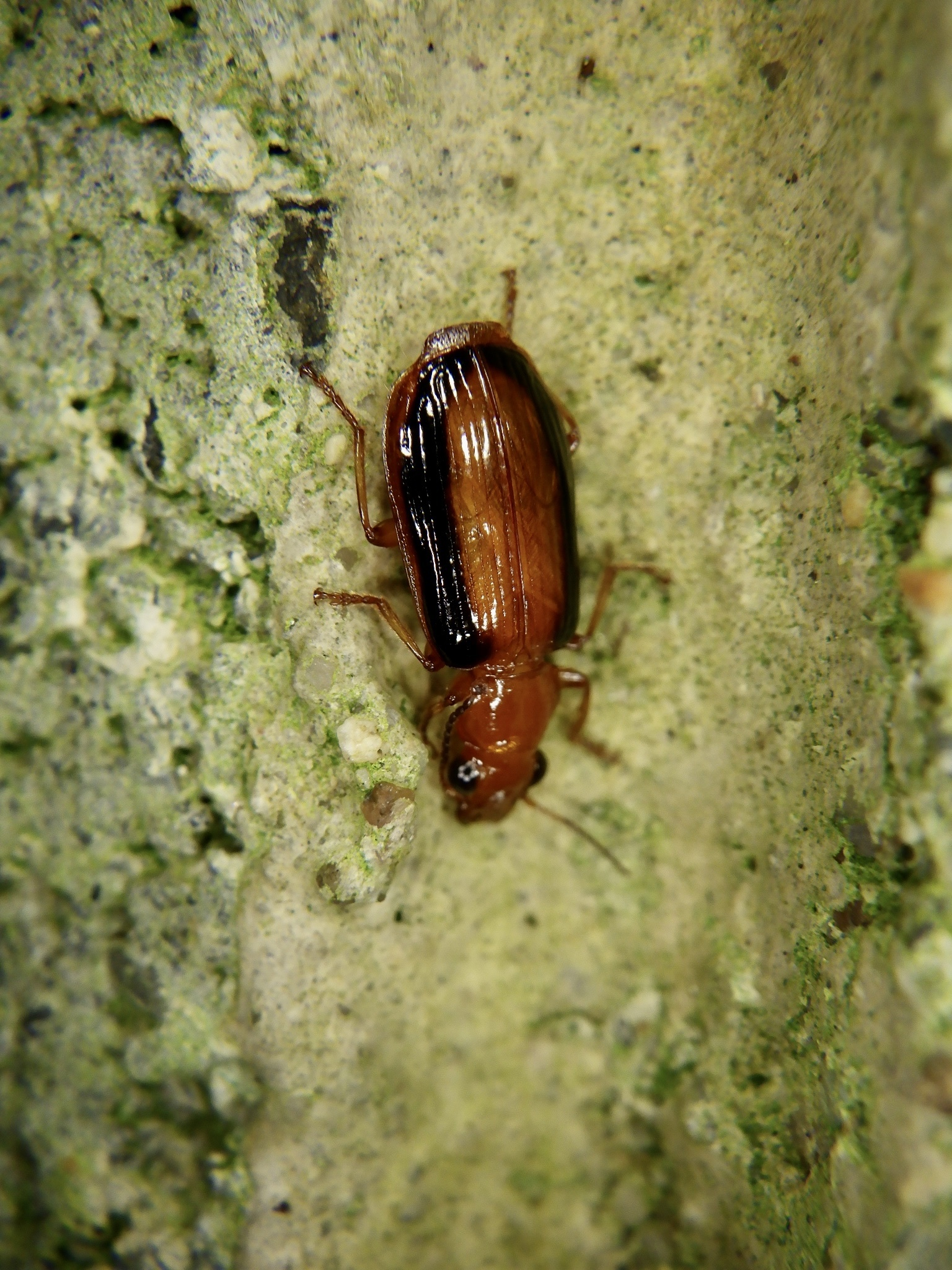
- Parena nigrolineata, China

Scientific classification
- Kingdom: Animalia
- Phylum: Arthropoda
- Class: Insecta
- Order: Coleoptera
- Suborder: Adephaga
- Family: Carabidae
- Subfamily: Lebiinae
- Tribe: Lebiini
- Subtribe: Metallicina
- Genus: Parena; Motschulsky, 1860

Synonyms
- Bothynoptera Schaum, 1863; Ceroglossa Chaudoir, 1878; Crossoglossa Chaudoir, 1873; Euprymira Fairmaire, 1901; Pazena Péringuey, 1896; Phloeodromius W.J.MacLeay, 1871; Prymira Fairmaire, 1899; Umgenia Péringuey, 1898

= Parena (beetle) =

Genus of beetles

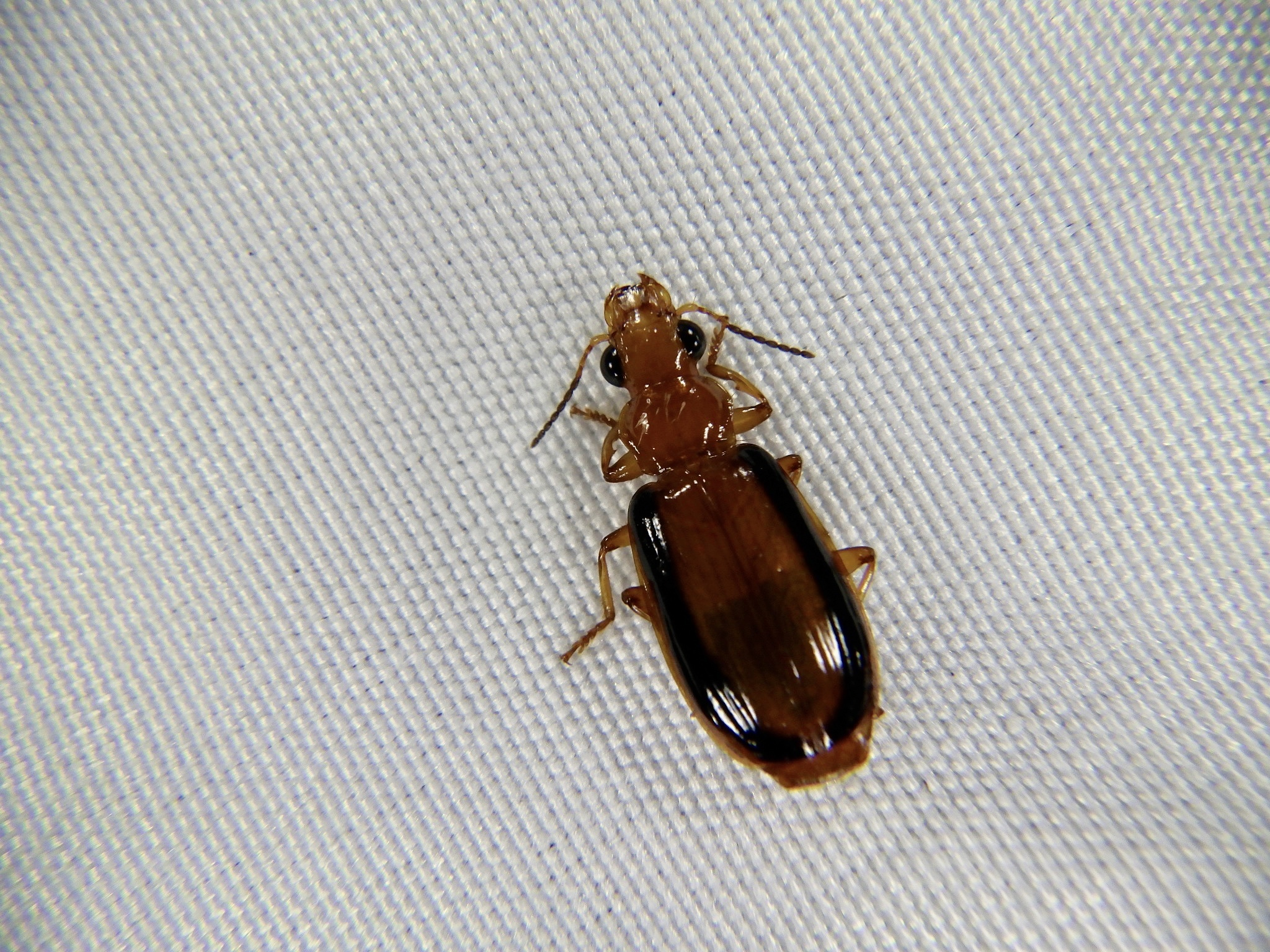
Parena nigrolineata nipponensis, Japan

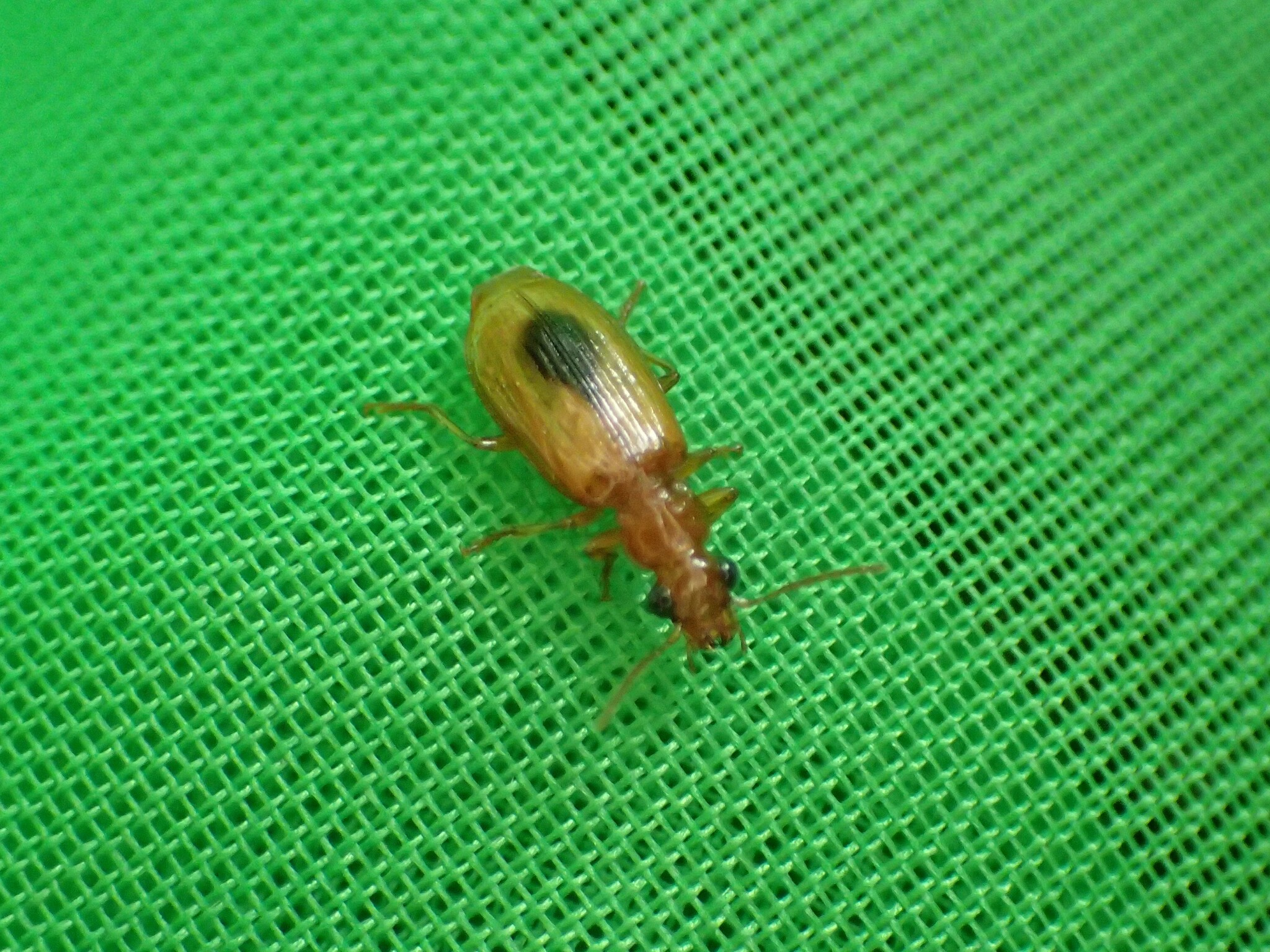
Parena monostigma, Japan

Parena is a genus in the ground beetle family Carabidae. There are more than 60 described species in Parena.

== Species ==
These 63 species belong to the genus Parena:

- Parena africana (Alluaud, 1917) (Africa)
- Parena albomaculata Habu, 1979 (Taiwan)
- Parena alluaudi Jeannel, 1949 (Madagascar)
- Parena amamiooshimensis Habu, 1964 (Japan)
- Parena andrewesi Jedlicka, 1934 (Philippines)
- Parena bicolor Motschulsky, 1860 (China, Indonesia, Philippines)
- Parena cavipennis (Bates, 1873) (South and Southeast Asia)
- Parena circumdata Shibata, 1987 (Taiwan)
- Parena cruralis Andrewes & Borneo.E, 1933
- Parena dorae Basilewsky, 1955 (Angola)
- Parena dorsigera (Schaum, 1863) (China, India, Vietnam)
- Parena emarginata Shi & Liang, 2023
- Parena fasciata (Chaudoir, 1873) (Southeast Asia, Australia)
- Parena ferruginea (Chaudoir, 1878) (Africa)
- Parena formosana Ohkura, 1978 (Taiwan)
- Parena fulva Shi & Liang, 2023
- Parena gonggaica Shi & Liang, 2023
- Parena hastata (Heller, 1921) (Philippines)
- Parena heteronycha Shi & Liang, 2023
- Parena kataevi Kirschenhofer, 2006 (China)
- Parena koreana Kirschenhofer, 1994 (North Korea)
- Parena kunmingensis Kirschenhofer, 1996 (China)
- Parena kurosai Habu, 1967 (Japan)
- Parena laesipennis (Bates, 1873) (Japan)
- Parena latecincta (Bates, 1873) (Asia)
- Parena levata Andrewes, 1931 (Indonesia)
- Parena madagascariensis (Alluaud, 1917) (Madagascar)
- Parena malaisei (Andrewes, 1947) (China, Myanmar)
- Parena mellea (Chaudoir, 1873) (Indonesia)
- Parena monostigma (Bates, 1873) (South Korea, Japan, Russia)
- Parena monticola Shibata, 1987 (Taiwan)
- Parena nantouensis Kirschenhofer, 1996 (Taiwan)
- Parena nepalensis Kirschenhofer, 1994 (Nepal)
- Parena nigrolineata (Chaudoir, 1852) (Asia)
- Parena obenbergeri Jedlicka, 1952
- Parena obscura Mateu, 1977 (Bhutan)
- Parena pendleburyi Andrewes, 1931 (Indonesia, Borneo)
- Parena perforata (Bates, 1873) (China, Japan, Russia)
- Parena phongsalyensis Kirschenhofer, 2011 (Laos)
- Parena picea (W.J.MacLeay, 1871) (Indonesia, New Guinea, Australia)
- Parena picipes Shi & Liang, 2023
- Parena plagiata Motschulsky, 1864 (Congo (Brazzaville), South Africa)
- Parena politissima (Chaudoir, 1883) (Samoa, New Caledonia)
- Parena quadrisignata Mateu, 1977 (Nepal, Bhutan)
- Parena rubripicta Andrewes, 1928 (South and Southeast Asia)
- Parena ruficornis Shi & Liang, 2023
- Parena rufotestacea Jedlicka, 1934 (South and Southeast Asia)
- Parena schillhammeri Kirschenhofer, 2006
- Parena sciakyi Shi & Liang, 2023
- Parena sellata (Heller, 1921) (Taiwan, Philippines)
- Parena shapingensis Xie & Yu, 1993 (China)
- Parena sticta (Andrewes, 1947) (Myanmar)
- Parena stigmatica (Fairmaire, 1899) (Madagascar)
- Parena sulawesiensis Kirschenhofer, 2006 (Indonesia)
- Parena sumatrana Kirschenhofer, 2011 (Indonesia)
- Parena taiwana Hua.A, 2002
- Parena tesari (Jedlicka, 1951) (Taiwan)
- Parena testacea (Chaudoir, 1873) (Asia)
- Parena triguttata Shi & Liang, 2023
- Parena tripunctata (Bates, 1873) (Eastern Asia)
- Parena valeriae Facchini, 2011 (Zambia)
- Parena wrasei Kirschenhofer, 2006 (Japan)
- Parena yunnana Kirschenhofer, 1994 (China)
