= Cheick Bougadary Traoré =

Malian politician

Cheick Boucadry Traoré is president of the African Convergence for Renewal (CARE), was selected as a candidate of his party on 28 January 2012 for the 2013 Malian presidential election. Traore is the son of President Moussa Traoré.
