= 1997 Malian parliamentary election =

1997 Malian parliamentary election may refer to:

- April 1997 Malian parliamentary election
- July 1997 Malian parliamentary election
