= Oumar Mariko =

Malian politician

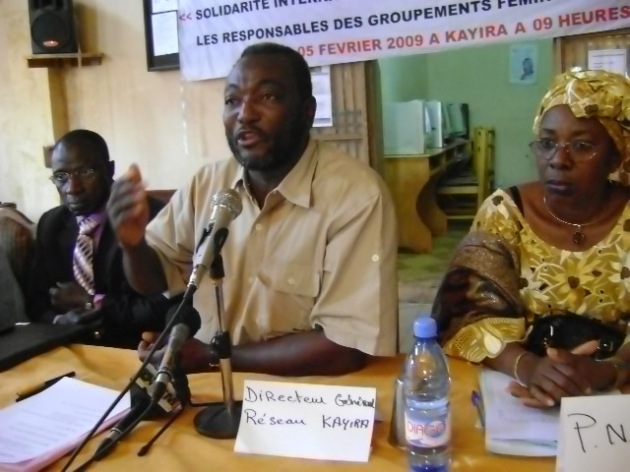

Secretary-General of African Solidarity for Democracy and Independence
- Incumbent
- Assumed office 1996

Personal details
- Born: 4 February 1959 Bafoulabé, French Sudan (now Mali)
- Party: SADI

Oumar Mariko (born 4 February 1959) is a Malian politician, doctor and noted former student activist. He is the Secretary-General of African Solidarity for Democracy and Independence (SADI), a left-wing political party, and has three times run for President of Mali, in 2002, 2007 and 2013.

== Biography ==
Born in Bafoulabé, his engagement in politics began in his student days. He worked as part of the National Union of Students and Pupils of Mali (UNEEM) at the Dioila lycée from 1976 to 1977 and the Badalabougou lycée from 1978 to 1979. He was a member of the union's organisation bureau from 1979 to 1980. A founding member of the Mali Students and Pupils' Association, he was its general secretary from 1990 to 1992. Mariko led protests that eventually led to the overthrow of Moussa Traoré in 1991 and participated in the Transitional Committee for the Salvation of the People (CTSP) representing the Student Association.

Oumar Mariko is a medical doctor and the founding director of the Mah Doumbia surgical clinic at Bamako. He has also been the director general of the private radio network Kayira since 1995 and is the external relations secretary of the URTEL, the trade union representing radio and television broadcasting in Mali.

== Political career ==
Together with Cheick Oumar Sissoko, in 1996 Mariko founded a political party, African Solidarity for Democracy and Independence (SADI), in opposition to President Alpha Oumar Konaré. He is the Secretary-General of SADI, which is avowedly leftist.

Mariko was chosen as the party's candidate for the April 2002 presidential election at its first ordinary congress in March 2002. In the election, he finished in 12th place with .88% of the vote. In the July 2002 parliamentary election, Mariko was a candidate in Kolondiéba constituency.

At the end of a SADI national conference, on February 24, 2007 Mariko was designated as the party's candidate for the April 2007 presidential election. He campaigned on the platform of opposition to the current economic, social, education and healthcare policies, declaring his wish for a "democratic and popular state". He opposed the privatisation of the Compagnie malienne pour le développement du textile (CMDT), the Huilerie cotonnière du Malo (Huicoma), and called for the re-nationalisation of the railways. He also opposed the alleged "favouritism" of President Amadou Toumani Touré in social housing. Throughout the campaign, Mariko declared that "elections will be neither transparent, nor sincere and even less credible", accusing the Citizen's Movement, which supported Touré, of attempting fraud. He finished in fourth place with 2.72% of the vote. In a press conference on May 29, Mariko denounced the electoral commission and the Constitutional Court for their handling of the election, saying that the former should be dissolved. He was also sharply critical of the main opposition coalition, the Front for Democracy and the Republic, in which he did not participate.

He won a seat in the National Assembly of Mali in the July 2007 parliamentary election on a SADI list in Kolondiéba; the other candidate on the list was Moussa Coumbéré. The SADI list took second place, with 21.28% of the vote, in the first round, behind the National Congress for Democratic Initiative (CNID) list, which received 25.29%. However, the SADI list won in the second round with 61.76% of the district's vote.

Mariko is a critic of economic globalization and the Bretton Wood Accords.

As of 2007–2008, Mariko is President of the Commission of Foreign Affairs, Malians Living Abroad, and African Integration in the National Assembly.

=== 2012 military coup d'etat ===
Following the coup d'état that suspended Mali's democratic institutions on the night of 21–22 March 2012, Oumar Mariko and his SADI political party created MP22, the Mouvement populaire du 22 mars (22 March People's Movement) supporting the coup plotters.

In the July–August 2013 parliamentary election, Mariko was re-elected to the National Assembly. He subsequently stood as a candidate for the post of President of the National Assembly, but in the vote held on 22 January 2014, the governing party's candidate, Issaka Sidibé, won easily, with 115 votes against 11 for Mariko.
