= Social Democratic Convention =

Political party in Mali

Social Democratic Convention Convention sociale démocrate
- Abbreviation: CDS
- Leader: Mamadou Blaise Sangaré
- Founder: Mamadou Blaise Sangaré
- Founded: 1996
- Dissolved: 13 May 2025

The Social Democratic Convention (French: Convention sociale démocrate; CDS), known as CDS-Mogotiguiya, was a political party in Mali led by Mamadou Blaise Sangaré. According to Sangaré, who founded the party, it was established on 7 January 1996 at Tabacoro, on the road to Ségou.

== Electoral history ==
In the 1997 parliamentary election the CDS won four of the 147 seats in the National Assembly. Sangaré contested the 2002 presidential election, receiving 34,603 votes (2.21%), and the 2007 presidential election, in which he stood for the Front for Democracy and the Republic (FDR) coalition and won 35,776 votes (1.58%) in a contest won by the incumbent president, Amadou Toumani Touré. For the 2018 election the party fielded no candidate of its own and instead backed the re-election of the incumbent president, Ibrahim Boubacar Keïta.

== Dissolution ==
On 7 May 2025 Mali's transitional military government, led by Assimi Goïta, suspended the activities of all political parties, citing reasons of public order. The parties, including the CDS, were dissolved by decree on 13 May 2025, ending multi-party politics in the country.

== See also ==
- List of political parties in Mali
- Politics of Mali
- 2025 Malian protests
