= Yeah Samake =

Malian politician and entrepreneur (born 1969)

Niankoro Yéah Samaké
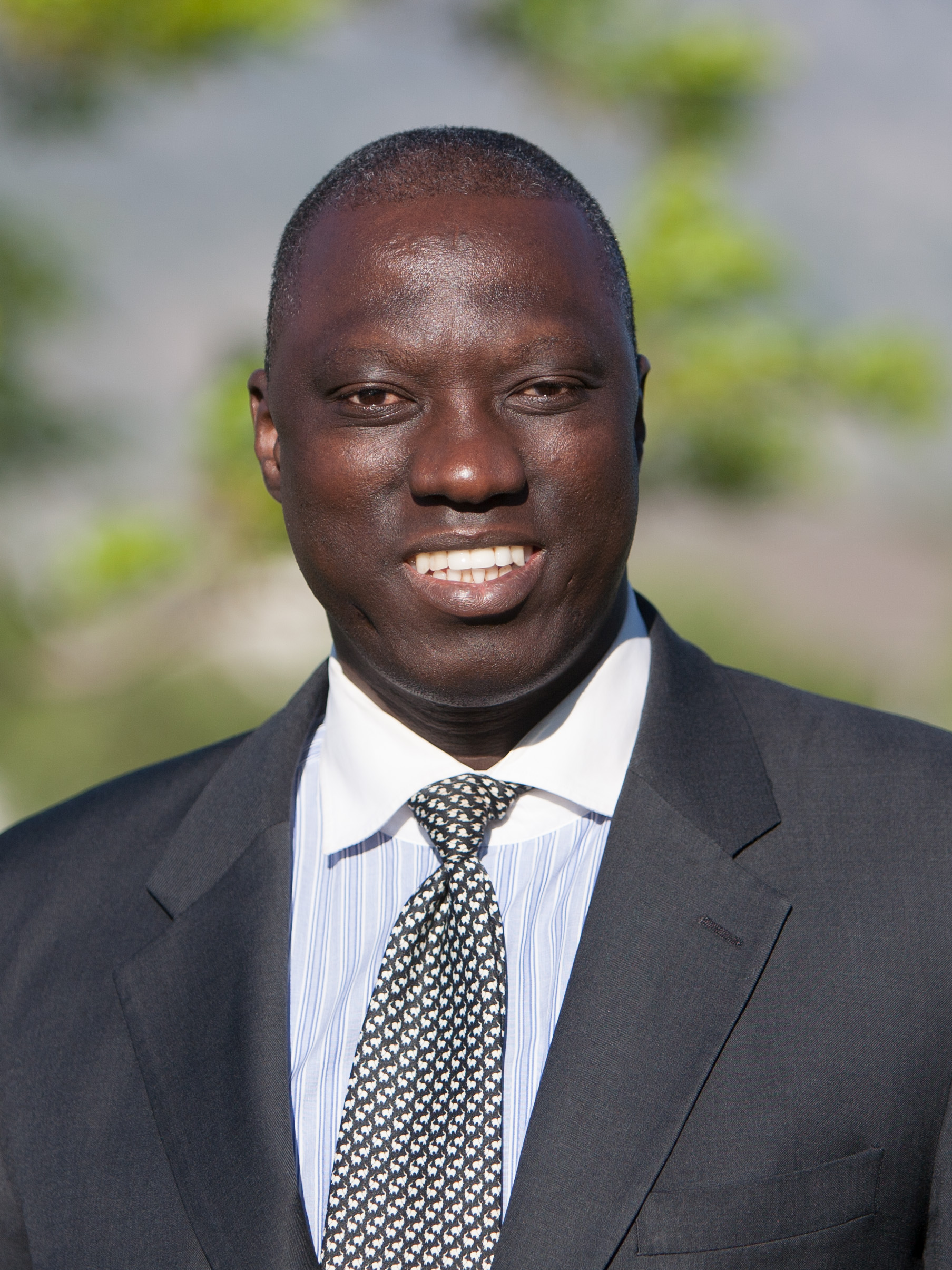

Personal details
- Born: 27 February 1969 (age 57) Ouélessébougou, Mali
- Party: Party for Civic and Patriotic Action
- Spouse: Marissa Coutinho-Samaké
- Children: Keanen; Carmen; KianaLyn
- Education: Brigham Young University (MPP)
- Occupation: Politician and President of the Party of Patriotic and Civic Action in Mali; Field Director of Empower Mali Foundation; Former Mali Ambassador to India; Former Mayor of Ouélessébougou, Mali;
- Known for: Former Mali Ambassador to India, 2013 and 2018 Presidential candidate Mali; Mayor of Ouélessébougou; Building schools and installing solar water systems in Mali;
- Website: empowermali.org;yeahsamake.com;

Niankoro Yéah Samaké (born 27 February 1969) is a Malian social entrepreneur and politician from Ouélessébougou, Mali. Samaké served as the Malian Ambassador to India. He was nominated by the Malian President Ibrahim Boubacar Keïta in May 2015 and he assumed the post in 2015. Samaké is the executive director of the Empower Mali Foundation, former mayor of Ouélessébougou, Vice President of Mali's League of Mayors, and was a candidate in the 2013 Malian presidential election and 2018 elections.

Samaké ran as a candidate in the Malian Presidential elections on 2 July 2018.

== Early life and education ==
The 8th of 18 children born to Tiecourafing Samaké who had three wives in a Muslim family, Niankoro Yéah Samaké was born in the small village of Ouélessébougou, where he and his family lived in such deep poverty that Samaké recalls how his mother would tie the stomachs of Samaké and his siblings to ease their hunger. Despite their material circumstances, Yéah's father Tiecourafing insisted that all of his children receive an education, not wanting them to suffer the darkness of illiteracy. An exception in a commune where only 15% of the population attended school, Samaké's father's vision contributed greatly to the family's later prominence in Ouélessébougou. Samaké recounts, "My father knew we would feel deprivation from time to time, but the odds weren't with us, anyway. When I was growing up, it was hard to survive. 45% of Malian children would die from malaria, diarrhea, and preventable diseases. We knew the challenges of staying well, but we believed in our father's wise resolve to have us educated. He is a hero to me, and any sacrifices were worth it." In addition to Samaké serving as mayor, one brother teaches physics at the university and some of Samaké's other brothers hold jobs in agricultural engineering and education.

Samaké finished high school at Lycée Prosper Kamara in Bamako, and continued his studies at École Normale Supérieure of Bamako, where he received a bachelor's degree in Teaching English as a Second Language. After completing school, finding no jobs, Samaké worked as a volunteer teacher in his village for the next three years. He also worked for the Ouélessébougou-Utah Alliance, an organization founded by Utahns in 1985 to partner with local Malians to improve heath, educational, and economic opportunities in the country. He supported himself during this time by working as a linguistic and cultural guide for the Peace Corps and Ouélessébougou Alliance. This brought him in contact with a couple from Colorado who were members of the Church of Jesus Christ of Latter-day Saints, Jeff and Gretchen Winston, who were impressed by Samaké's work ethic and his devotion to his community.

=== Brigham Young University (BYU) ===
The Winstons sponsored Samaké to come to the United States to further his education. He was accepted to Brigham Young University (BYU) in 2000. At BYU, he earned a master's degree in public policy and served as president of the Black Student Union. During his time at BYU, Samaké met his wife Marissa Coutinho, a native of India who was studying Information Systems at BYU. While at BYU, Samaké completed an internship at the United Nations.

=== École normale supérieure (ENSUP) ===
Samaké completed a 4-year bachelor's degree in Teaching English as a Second Language at the university École normale supérieure (ENSUP) in Bamako.

== Career and politics ==
=== Ambassador of the Republic of Mali ===
On 7 May 2015 Mali President Ibrahim Boubacar Keïta appointed Samaké to be the second Ambassador and plenipotentiary of the Republic of Mali overseeing diplomatic relations with 10 countries: India, Nepal, Bangladesh, Bhutan, Indonesia, Sri Lanka, Thailand, Malaysia, Singapore and Brunei Darussalam.

During his tenure as Ambassador, Samaké presented his credentials to the Heads of 8 of the countries he oversaw. He focused his diplomatic efforts in the field of culture, cotton, agriculture, education, human development, women & child healthcare and solar energy.

During his tenure, Samaké also focused his efforts on agriculture and increasing cotton processing and export ties with different Indian businesses. Additionally, Samaké worked closely with universities in India and Bangladesh to create scholarship opportunities for Malian students to come study.

Solar also being a key topic, a partnership was forged with the Barefoot College and India's ITEC scholarship program to bring and train five rural Malian women in the field of solar power.

On 22 January 2018 Samaké announced that he would run for the Presidency of Mali in the 29 July 2018 elections. He left his post in India and returned to Mali.

=== Mayor ===
Due to his work in development, Samaké became well known and respected in Mali. In 2009, Samaké recounts how the current mayor, who had already been in power for 10 years, was seeking re-election for a third term. At this time less than 10% of the population of Ouélessébougou was paying their taxes and salaries were behind for 6 months. Samaké ran for the position of Mayor of Ouélessébougou under the Union for the Republic and Democracy (URD) party. Ouélessébougou encompasses 44 villages. Samaké's name was listed at the top of a slate of 23 candidates for council positions. Samaké won with 86 percent of the vote. Samaké focused on ending corruption and increasing government transparency as Mayor. In 2009, Ouélessébougou was ranked 699 out of 703 communes (groupings of tribal villages) in Mali for governmental management and transparency. Two years into Samaké's tenure as mayor, the city now ranks in the top 10 in the country, with a tax collection rate of 68 percent. Samaké's term as mayor has seen a significant rise in tax revenue as well. Prior to his election as mayor, less than 10% of the population were paying their taxes. At the end of 2010, tax collection had risen to 68%, and is expected to reach between 80–90% by the end of 2011. As Samaké turned Ouélessébougou around, he was elected vice president of Mali's League of Mayors (704 mayors nationwide). In December 2011, Samaké coordinated with the Utah League of Cities and Towns to bring several mayors from Mali to Utah so that they could experience better government practices. He also lobbied for and got increased resources from the central government to build a new hospital, a first public high school in the region, a new water pump system to replace old water wells and a solar panel field, the largest in West Africa. Included in his track record as Mayor, Samaké with funds from the government has also provided funds in the amount of 5 million FCFA(about 10000USD) to repair and equip existing schools with school desks and supplies. Samake also helps facilitate medical and dental expeditions from US partners.

On 7 May 2015 President Ibrahim Boubacar Keïta appointed Yéah Samaké to be the Ambassador of the Republic of Mali to India, Nepal, Sri Lanka, Bhutan, Malaysia, Singapore, Indonesia, Brunei Darussalam and Thailand.

=== Empower Mali Foundation ===
In February 2013, Samaké created and became the Country Director for the Empower Mali Foundation. Empower Mali, a US-based organization, focuses on working with rural communities in Mali to meet the growing needs in the areas of education, healthcare, clean water and clean energy. Empower Mali seeks to build permanent skills in its beneficiaries and not just solve temporary problems. This is the logic behind the investment the use. They seek to have the benefited communities involved in both the needs assessment and financial portion of their projects. To date Empower Mali has been able to bring 21 additional middle schools,80 water systems 8 teachers housings, 2 electric playgrounds, a tablet program for schools, host a governance summit between Mali and Utah and sponsored an after school program in 16 of the poorest schools in the Malian capital city of Bamako providing children with additional study/teacher aid.

=== Mali Rising Foundation ===
After graduating with a master's degree in Public Policy in 2004, Adrian Escalante founded the Daily Dose Foundation, now known as the Mali Rising Foundation and made Samaké the Executive Director. The focus of the Mali Rising Foundation is to improve the educational opportunities of children living in rural Mali. They do this by building schools in villages where schools do not exist as well as providing teacher training and learning resources and materials. Through his work with the Foundation, Samaké has helped build 17 schools in Mali over the last nine years serving more than 2,500 students between the ages of 13 and 17.

=== Political Party: Party Pour L'Action Civique et Patriotique (PACP) ===
In 2011, Samaké and his followers formed the Party for Civic and Patriotic Action (PACP) to support his Presidential run. The PACP charter emphasizes the values of patriotism, citizenship, decentralization, freedom, democracy, human rights, and good governance.

=== Candidate: Mali 2012 presidential campaign ===
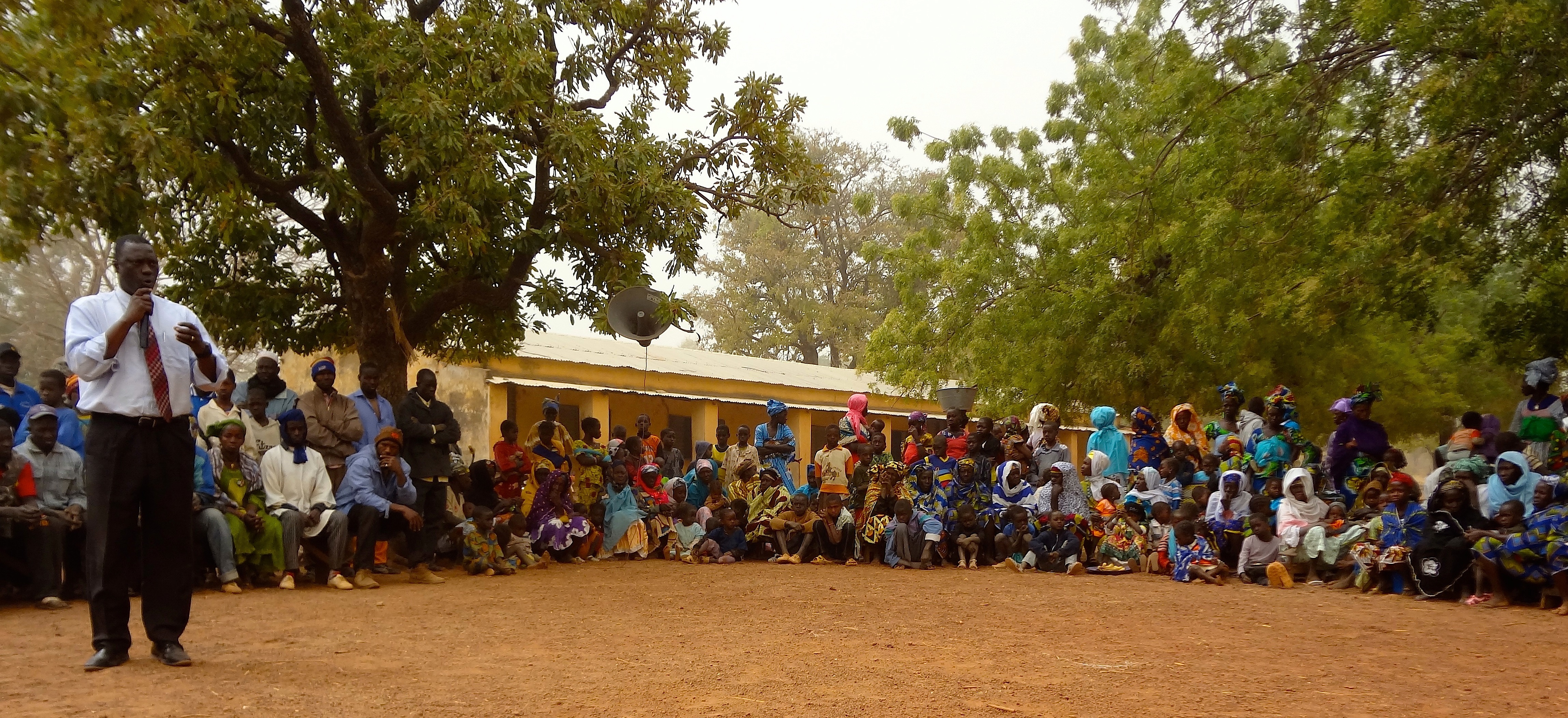
Yéah Samaké speaking in front of crowd in Beneko, Mali

Samaké ran on a platform of decentralization and anti-corruption. Based on his experiences as mayor, Samaké stated that the most effective way to govern is to inspire the trust and participation of citizens at the local level.

In an effort to fight corruption in the electoral system, Samaké did not fund-raise in Mali, where political funds are connected to political favors, but instead in the United States and through online donations.

Malians were scheduled to vote in a two poll race on 29 April 2012.

However, the 2012 presidential election failed to happen due to a military coup d'état that overthrew the Malian government.

=== Candidate: Mali 2013 presidential campaign ===
Elections were rescheduled for 28 July 2013. Samaké was a candidate in the 2013 Malian presidential election. In the first round of voting he placed 16th out of 27 candidates, receiving 0.56 per cent of the vote.

=== Candidate: Mali 2018 presidential campaign ===
Elections took place on 29 July 2018. Samaké ran as a candidate in the 2018 presidential elections under his party Party for Civic and Patriotic Action. He announced his candidacy on 22 January 2018 after leaving his post as the Ambassador of the Republic of Mali to India.

He lost in the first round of the elections. During the second round, he gave his support to the incumbent President Ibrahim Boubacar Keïta. President Ibrahim Boubacar Keïta won with 67.17% of the vote.

== Personal life ==
Samaké and his wife Marissa have three children: Keanen, Carmen and KianaLyn

Samaké's wife, Marissa Coutinho-Samaké (b. 29 July 1983), is Indian but was born and raised in Bahrain. She attended BYU for her bachelor's degree in information systems. They married in August 2004.

Samaké and his family are members of the Church of Jesus Christ of Latter-day Saints. Samaké first encountered the church through his work with the Peace Corps and Ouélessébougou Alliance. One Peace Corps volunteer left him an English Book of Mormon, which he read. Later, in the US, he wanted to be baptized, but was initially refused because of the Church of Jesus Christ of Latter-day Saints policy on baptizing citizens of Islamic countries. Mali is 90% Muslim, and the church worried that if he became a member of the Church of Jesus Christ of Latter-day Saints his life would be in danger. After convincing church leaders that Mali is a country with religious freedom, he was baptized in 2000 in New York. He reports that he faces no discrimination in Mali due to his faith.
