= Alliance for Solidarity in Mali =

Political party in Mali

The Alliance for Solidarity in Mali–Convergence of Patriotic Forces (French: Alliance pour la Solidarité au Mali–Convergence des forces patriotiques, ASMA-CFP) was a political party in Mali led by Soumeylou Boubèye Maïga.

== History ==
The party was officially registered on 10 June 2013. In the 2013 parliamentary elections it won three seats in the National Assembly, being the most voted-for party in Gao, Bankass and Macina.
