= Party for Civic and Patriotic Action =

Political party in Mali

Party for Civic and Patriotic Action Parti pour l'Action Civique et Patriotique
- Leader: Yeah Samake
- Ideology: Democracy; Human Rights; Anti-corruption
- Colours: Yellow, Black and Green
- National Assembly: 0 / 160

Website
- Official Website

The Party for Civic and Patriotic Action (French: Parti pour l’Action Civique et Patriotique, PACP) is a political party in Mali founded by Yeah Samake and his followers. The PACP charter (Samake's party) emphasizes the values of patriotism, citizenship, decentralization, freedom, democracy, human rights, and good governance.
