= Mamadou Blaise Sangaré =

Malian politician

Mamadou Bakary "Blaise" Sangaré (born 16 November 1954) is a Malian politician. He is the President of the Social Democratic Convention (CDS-Mogotigiya).

Sangaré, who was born in Bamako, was a founding member of the Party for Democracy and Progress (PDP), which was created in 1991. He served as its Secretary-General and then as its vice-president. He left the PDP and was a founding member of the CDS in 1996; he has been President of the CDS since then. Sangaré ran as the CDS candidate in the April 2002 presidential election, finishing in eighth place with 2.21% of the vote.

Sangaré was elected as a national advisor on the High Council of Territorial Communities on March 18, 2007.

On March 27, 2007, he was again designated as the CDS candidate for the April 2007 presidential election, and in the election he placed fifth with 1.58% of the vote. In the 2007 election, he was one of four candidates participating in the Front for Democracy and the Republic opposition coalition.
