= African Solidarity for Democracy and Independence =

Political party in Mali

African Solidarity for Democracy and Independence Solidarité Africaine pour la Démocratie et l'Indépendance
- Abbreviation: SADI
- Chairman: Cheick Oumar Sissoko
- Secretary-General: Oumar Mariko
- Founded: 1996
- Dissolved: 13 May 2025
- Ideology: Communism; Marxism–Leninism; Pan-Africanism
- Political position: Far-left
- International affiliation: IMCWP; ICS (defunct)
- Colors: Red and yellow

Website
- www.parti-sadi.com

African Solidarity for Democracy and Independence (French: Solidarité Africaine pour la Démocratie et l'Indépendance, SADI) was a Marxist-Leninist party in Mali. It was founded by Cheick Oumar Sissoko and Oumar Mariko in 1996; Sissoko was the party's president and Mariko was its Secretary-General, the top post in the party. The party was Pan-Africanist in ideology, was affiliated internationally with the International Communist Seminar, a grouping organised by the Workers' Party of Belgium, and was in part an outgrowth of the 1991 demonstrations against the military rule of President Moussa Traoré. Mariko was head of the Association of Students and Pupils of Mali (AEEM) during the 1991 protest movement which overthrew the government.

== History ==
The party held its first ordinary congress in March 2002, at which Mariko was chosen as its candidate for the April 2002 presidential election. In this election, Mariko took 12th place with 0.88% of the vote. In the July 2002 parliamentary election, the party won six out of 147 seats. After this, Sissoko joined the government as Minister of Culture, although Mariko opposed this move.

The party's second ordinary congress was held in Koutiala in December 2006, at which it was decided to nominate a candidate for the April 2007 presidential election at a national conference on 23–24 February 2007. Mariko was again chosen as the party's presidential candidate at this conference. In the April election, he took fourth place with 2.72% of the vote.

The party's platform for the July 2007 parliamentary election focused on its opposition to the privatisation of state industries. The party won four of the 147 seats in the National Assembly, and was highly critical of the ruling coalition of Malian President Amadou Toumani Touré. When parliamentary groups in the new National Assembly were created in September 2007, SADI formed a parliamentary group with the Party for National Rebirth (PARENA). Following the elections, a local secretary-general of SADI, Youssouf Dembélé, was found dead on 12 August, in what the party described as an assassination.

In the 2013 parliamentary elections, SADI won five seats.
