= Democratic Alliance for Peace =

Political party in Mali

The Democratic Alliance for Peace (French: Alliance Démocratique pour la Paix, ADP-MALIBA) was a political party in Mali led by Aliou Boubacar Diallo.

== History ==
The party was registered on 18 March 2013. It supported the winning candidate, Ibrahim Boubacar Keïta, in the 2013 presidential elections, and won two seats in the 2013 parliamentary elections.

On 11 August 2020, following the 2020 Malian protests, the ADP-Maliba announced it was withdrawing from the Keïta government.
