= Housseini Amion Guindo =

Malian politician

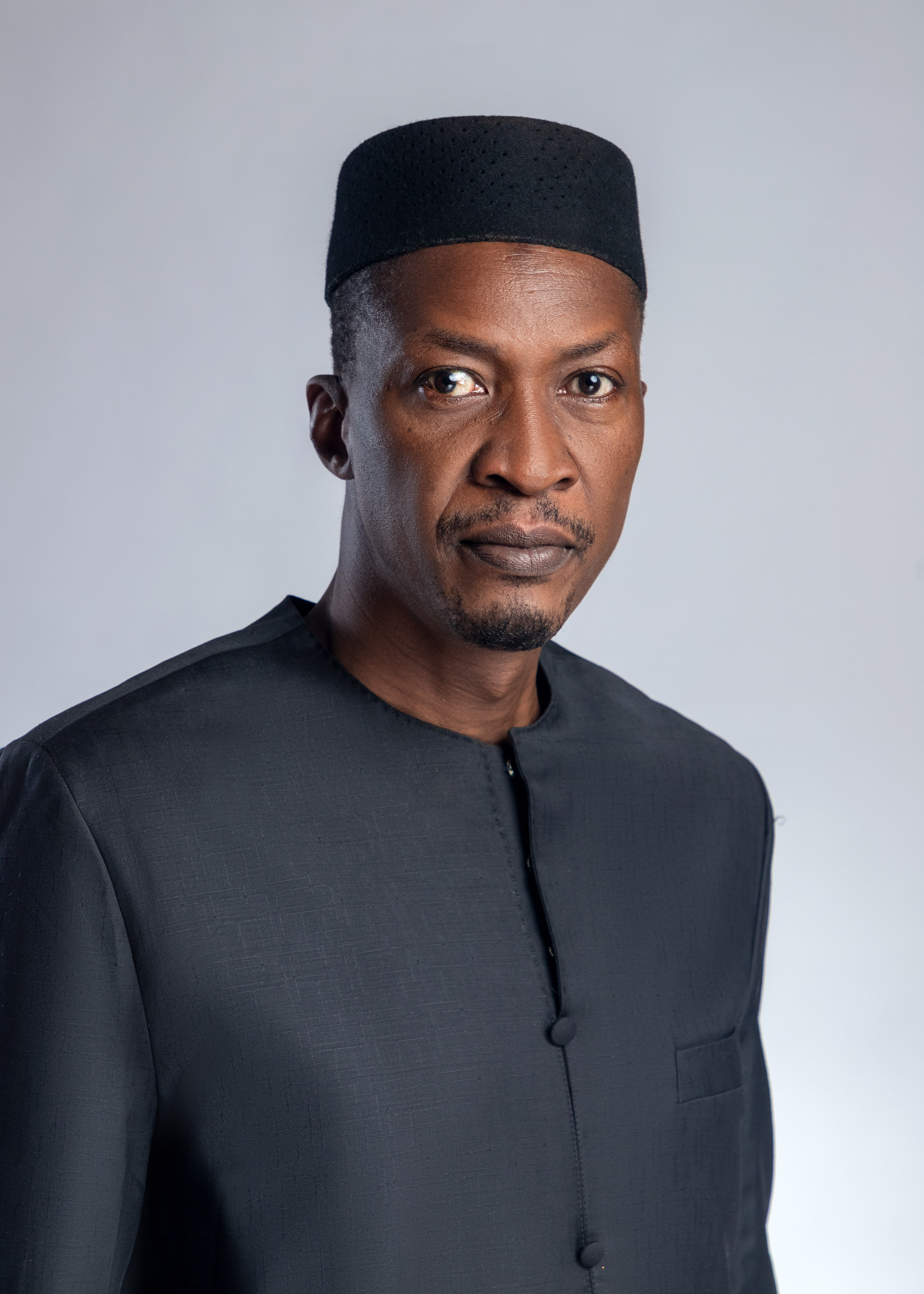
Portrait of Housseini Amion Guindo

Housseïni Amion Guindo, “Poulo” (born April 21, 1970) is a Malian politician. He is the current Minister of Sport since 12 April 2014.

He has been elected member of parliament in 2005 and 2010 to represent the Sikasso Cercle.

In 2011, he is designated to represent the CODEM party and the PUR (Partis Unis pour la République) party coalition for the 2012 presidential election.

== Biography ==
Born on April 21, 1970, in Bandiagara in the Mopti Region, he is married to Aminata Guindo. Muslim, he is the father of four: Boubacar, Ali, Awa and Maya.

He obtained his baccalauréat in 1991 at Monseigneur Didier de Montclos High School in Sikasso then joins the Bamako ENSup where he gets a Master's degree in Humanities in 1997.

== Political career ==
In 2005, independent candidate, he is elected member of parliament, representing the Sikasso Cercle.

In 2005, he joins RPM which he leaves in 2007, before the elections.

In 2007, he is reelected as member of parliament in Sikasso Cercle.

In 2008, he is elected president of CODEM, party he co-founded that same year.

In 2013, he finishes in fifth place in the first round of Mali's presidential election, garnering over 144,000 votes.

In November 2021, Housseini Amion Guindo said he was the victim of an attempted kidnapping. “Poulo”, as he is nicknamed, is one of the main Malian opponents of the transitional authorities.

== Football ==
In 2004, he acquires the Stade Malien de Sikasso, a football club founded in 1963. The club accesses first division for the first time in 2004.

From 2007 to 2009, he is vice-president of the Malian Football Federation.

== Education ==
He opened two schools in the city of Sikasso:

- Amion Guindo High School in 2001.
- Bah Fanta Professional School.
