= Party for the Restoration of Malian Values =

Political party in Mali

The Party for the Restoration of Malian Values (French: Parti pour la Restauration des Valeurs Mali, PRVM) is a political party in Mali led by Mamadou Sidibe.

== History ==
The party was officially registered on 20 March 2013. In the 2013 parliamentary elections it won a single seat.
