= Party for Economic Development and Solidarity =

Political party in Mali

Party for Economic Development and Solidarity Parti pour le Développement Economique et la Solidarité
- Leader: Hamed Diané Séméga
- Founded: 2010
- Dissolved: 13 May 2025
- Ideology: Liberalism
- Political position: Centre
- Regional affiliation: Africa Liberal Network

The Party for Economic Development and Solidarity (French: Parti pour le Développement Economique et la Solidarité, PDES) was a political party in Mali led by Hamed Diané Séméga.

== History ==
The party was established on 17 July 2010 by supporters of President Amadou Toumani Touré, and officially registered on 14 September. The party's Vice-president Jamille Bittar was its candidate in the 2013 presidential elections. He finished ninth in the first round.

In the 2013 parliamentary elections it won three seats.
