= Malian Union for the African Democratic Rally =

Political party in Mali

Malian Union for the African Democratic Rally Union Malienne du Rassemblement Démocratique Africain
- Leader: Mamadou Bamou Touré
- Founded: 2010; 16 years ago
- Dissolved: 13 May 2025; 14 months ago
- Headquarters: Bamako, Mali
- Ideology: African nationalism Pan-Africanism

The Malian Union for the African Democratic Rally (French: Union Malienne du Rassemblement Démocratique Africain, UM-RDA) was a political party in Mali led by Bocar Moussa Diarra.

== History ==
The party was formed by a merger of the Sudanese Union – African Democratic Rally and the Bloc for Democracy and African Integration in August 2010, and officially registered on 26 Aug 2010. In the 2013 parliamentary elections it won a single seat.
