= Convergence for the Development of Mali =

Political party in Mali

Convergence for the Development of Mali Convergence pour le développement du Mali
- Spokesperson: Housseini Guindo
- Founded: 2008
- Dissolved: 13 May 2025

Convergence for the Development of Mali (French: Convergence pour le développement du Mali; CODEM) was a political party in Mali. Its emblem is a distaff and its slogan is "Let's count on our own strengths first" (Comptons d’abord sur nos propres forces).

== History ==
The party was established on 23 May 2008 by five MPs; Alassane Abba, Housseini Guindo, Marie Sylla, Saran Sinaté and Souleymane Guindo.

In the 2013 parliamentary elections it won five seats, becoming the fifth largest party in the National Assembly.
