= Patriotic Movement for Renewal =

Political party in Mali

Patriotic Movement for Renewal Mouvement Patriotique pour le Renouveau
- President: Choguel Kokalla Maïga
- Founded: 1995
- Dissolved: 13 May 2025

The Patriotic Movement for Renewal (French: Mouvement Patriotique pour le Renouveau; MPR) was a political party in Mali. The MPR claims the legacy of Moussa Traoré, Second President of Mali

The MPR candidate in the presidential election held on 28 April 2002 was Choguel Kokalla Maïga, who won 2.7% of the vote.

In the parliamentary election held on 14 July 2002, the MPR won 5 out of 160 seats as a part of the Hope 2002 coalition. In the 1 July and 22 July 2007 parliamentary election, the party won 8 out of 160 seats.
