= Union for Democracy and Development (Mali) =

Political party in Mali

- President: Hassane Barry

The Union for Democracy and Development (French: Union pour la démocratie et le développement) was a political party in Mali, led by Hassane Barry. In the 1 July and 22 July 2007 Malian parliamentary elections, the party won 3 out of 160 seats. The party is affiliated to the Alliance for Democracy and Progress, that supported president Amadou Toumani Touré.

The UDD is considered to be opposed to current president Ibrahim Boubacar Keïta, particularly his handling of the Mali War.
