= Party for National Rebirth =

Political party in Mali

Party for National Rebirth Le Parti pour la renaissance nationale
- President: Tiébilé Dramé
- Founded: 1995
- Dissolved: 13 May 2025

The Party for National Rebirth (French Parti pour la renaissance nationale, PARENA) was a Malian political party, created in 1995 by activists from the National Congress for Democratic Initiative (CNID). The Party for National Rebirth was headed by Tiébilé Dramé, who ran for the presidency in 2002, gaining 4% of the votes, coming in fourth place. In February 2007, he was again nominated as the party's presidential candidate for the April 2007 presidential election, receiving third place and 3.04% of the vote.

In the communal elections on 30 May 2004, the Party for National Rebirth placed fourth, with around 700 of its candidates elected as local councillors.

PARENA won four seats in National Assembly in the July 2007 parliamentary election. Following the election, PARENA formed a parliamentary group with the African Solidarity for Democracy and Independence (SADI).

The party's symbol was a white ram.
