= National Assembly (Mali) =

Legislative body

National Assembly Bambara: Depitebulon

Type
- Type: Unicameral
- Term limits: 5 years

History
- Founded: 1960
- Seats: 147 deputies

Elections
- Voting system: Two-round voting
- Last election: 2020

Meeting place
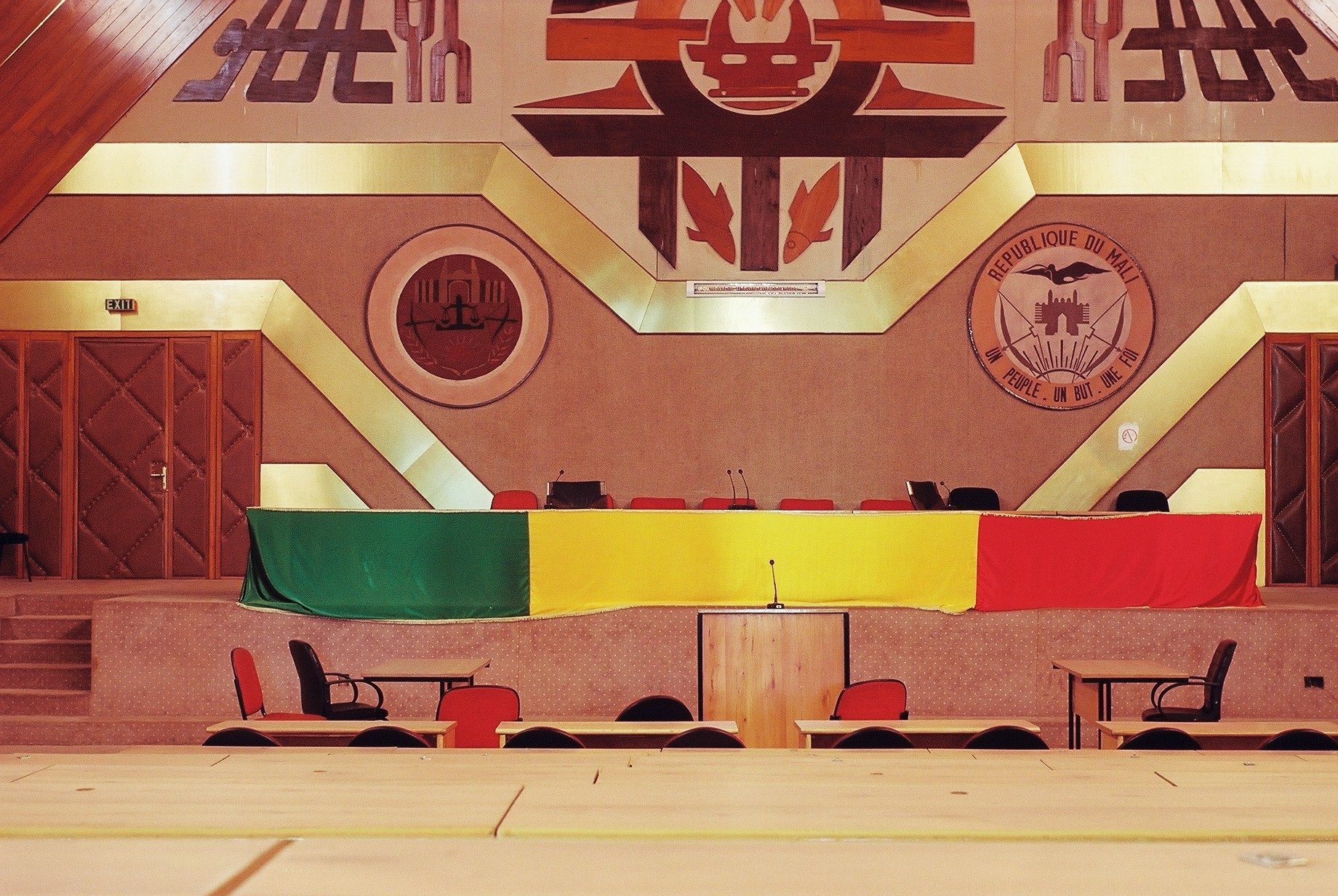
- Bamako, Mali

Website
- assemblee-nationale.ml

The National Assembly of Mali (Bambara: Mali depitebulon) was the unicameral legislative body of Mali of 147 voting members.

== Legislative history ==
The first Territorial Assembly was established in 1958 in French Sudan. It was reformed into Legislative Assembly of the Sudanese Republic in 1959, which became the unicameral National Assembly upon Mali's independence in 1960 after the breakup of Mali Federation. It had 80 members elected for five-year terms. A single-party rule was established. The National Assembly was dissolved in January 1968.

A new constitution in 1974 outlined a single-party rule, and four-year terms in the National Assembly with 82 seats. Elections took place in 1979. The 1981 constitutional amendment changed the term to three years. The National Assembly was dissolved in after the 1991 coup, and replaced by Transitional Committee for the Salvation of the People (CTSP).

The 1992 constitution outlined a unicameral National Assembly which had 116 deputies elected for five-year terms. Multiparty rule was established at that time.

The 2013 elections were the first held after the 2012 Malian coup d'état which led to the overthrow of President Amadou Toumani Touré. The current National Assembly was formed following two rounds of parliamentary elections, held on 24 November and 15 December. The Rally for Mali (RPM) party and its allies were victorious, capturing 115 of the 147 seats. RPM Deputy Issaka Sidibé was elected President of the National Assembly on 22 January 2014. Nearly 85% of the members are newcomers serving their first term. Thirteen of the 147 (8.8%) elected members are women, one less than the previous Assembly. On 12 November 2015, the National Assembly adopted a law requiring that at least 30% of elected or appointed officials must be women.

The National Assembly was dissolved in August 2020 after the coup. Transitional National Council (Conseil national de transition) was established in December 2020.

The 2023 constitution outlines a bicameral parliament with a Senate to be established.

== Description Before 2020 ==
Members of the National Assembly, called deputies, are elected by direct universal suffrage for a five-year term, during which they enjoy parliamentary immunity. Members are directly elected in single-member districts using a two-round voting system where candidates must receive an absolute majority of votes in order to win.

The Assembly normally meets twice a year, on the first Monday in October for no more than 75 days and the first Monday in April for no more than 90 days. The Prime Minister or a majority of the members can call an extra session. If the session is held at the instigation of Assembly members, it must not exceed 15 days.

== Controversies ==
A 2009 amendment to the Malian Family Code which would have given women more rights was met by huge demonstrations by Muslims demanding it not be signed, following which President Toure sent the bill back to the National Assembly.

== See also ==
- History of Mali
- Politics of Mali
- List of legislatures by country
- List of presidents of the National Assembly of Mali
- Legislative branch
