= Charles Samba Sissoko =

Minister of Foreign Affairs of Mali
- In office September 10, 1970 – March 8, 1978
- Preceded by: Sori Coulibaly
- Succeeded by: Yusuf Traore

Minister of Defense of Mali
- In office November 22, 1968 – January 1, 1969
- Preceded by: Henri Corenthin
- Succeeded by: Kissima Doukara

Commander of the Malian Presidential Guard
- In office 1962–1967
- President: Modibo Keita

Personal details
- Born: January 5, 1932 Kaolack, French Sudan (now Kaolack, Senegal
- Died: July 18, 2000 (aged 68) Bamako, Mali

Military service
- Rank: Colonel
- Battles/wars: First Indochina War

Charles Samba Sissoko, also spelled Cissoko or Cissokho was a Malian soldier and politician who served as Minister of Defense after the 1968 Malian coup d'état and as Minister of Foreign Affairs from 1970 to 1978. Sissoko was known for being the "intellectual of the CMLN".

== Biography ==
Sissoko was born on January 5, 1932, in Kaolack, French Sudan (now part of Senegal). He attended the Catholic Dakar School for Children of the Troops in Dakar, where he joined the French Colonial Army in 1953 and fought in the First Indochina War from 1953 to 1954. After studying at the military academy in Fréjus, he returned to Mali as a captain in 1962 and commanded the Presidential Guard from 1963 to 1967. He was promoted to lieutenant in 1964.

At the time of the 1968 Malian coup d'état, Sissoko was commanding an army base in Tessalit. He was one of the few putschists not at in Kati at the time of the coup; Moussa Traoré had sent a plane to pick Sissoko up in Tessalit and bring him to Kati. After the success of the coup, Sissoko was appointed Minister of Security and Information. Less than two months later, on January 1, 1969, he was appointed Minister of Defense. His appointment to Minister of Defense came as a result of the deletion and instatement of new ministries in late 1968; the Ministry of National Defense led by Henry Corenthin became the Ministry of Defense, and the minister was ranked the third-most important figure in Mali. When Sissoko was appointed Minister of Defense, he was one of only two putschists in government positions. The other was Yoro Diakité, President of the Provisional Government.

On August 20, 1969, a coup attempt occurred by supporters of the deposed Modibo Keïta. The putschists tried to arrest Moussa Traore and Yoro Diakité, while taking advantage of the fact that Sissoko was on a diplomatic visit to Moscow. During the political conflict between Traore and Diakite that began in 1969, Sissoko, Tiécoro Bagayoko, Karim Dembélé, and Kissima Doukara supported Diakite.

From 1970 to 1978, Sissoko served as Minister of Foreign Affairs. On October 7, 1974, Sissoko spoke at the UN calling for international aid to help Malian civilians during the 1974 Sahelian Drought. He also spoke against the American-backed détente during the Cold War, saying that true détente required a relaxation of Cold War rivalries worldwide. Sissoko, during a visit to Nouakchott and Dakar in the wake of the Faramana conflict, organized an OAU meeting to end the conflict. This succeeded after Malian president Traore and Upper Voltan president Sangoulé Lamizana met in Lomé. Sissoko, throughout the brief border conflict, asserted Malian diplomatic dominance over Faramana.

During the Events of February 28, 1978, Bagayoko, Dembele, and Doukara were all arrested by Traore on allegations that they were plotting to overthrow him. Sissoko was not present for these events, but was arrested immediately after returning to Mali from a mission in Tripoli, Libya. Sissoko was alleged to have been the head of state had the coup plot succeeded. He was stripped of his rank of colonel and made a 2nd class private, and sentenced to hard work in the Taoudenni concentration camps. He was released in 1983.

Sissoko died on July 18, 2000, in Bamako.

== Videography ==
- Sissoko speaks at the United Nations, 1974

== Photography ==
- Sissoko in 1968, location unknown
- Sissoko in Belgium, 1968
