= Samba Sangare =

- Born: Samba Gaïné Sangaré; 1939; Ntomikoro, French Sudan
- Died: February 11, 2011 (aged 71–72); Luxembourg Hospital, Bamako, Mali
- Spouse: Maimouna Keita
- Children: 6
- Military career
- Allegiance: France (1955-1960); Mali Federation (1959-1960); Mali (1960-1969)
- Rank: Senior Sergeant
- Known for: Writing a memoir about his time in Taoudenni for plotting a 1969 coup attempt
- Conflicts: Algerian War; ONUC
- Other work: Author of Ten Years in the Deadly Penal Labor of Taoudenni

Samba Gaïné Sangaré was a Malian author and soldier who participated in a 1969 coup plot to overthrow Moussa Traoré, a president whose regime was largely viewed as oppressing. Sangare was sentenced to ten years of hard labor in Taoudenni, and wrote the book Ten Years of Hard Labor in Taoudenni about his experience.

== Early life ==
Sangare was born in 1933 in Ntomikoro, French Sudan (now Nara Cercle, Koulikoro Region, Mali). He completed his primary schooling in Nara and was admitted to high school in Bamako, but accused his professors of corruption and was kicked back to Nara. 18 year-old Sangare became an assistant clerk in the Native Society of Providence in Nara, an organization compulsory for peasants in French colonies.

Sangare left his job in December 1953 to join the French Colonial Army. He completed basic training at a base in Ségou alongside future compatriots Mamadou Sanogo and Kissima Doukara. After completing basic training, Sangare served in the 1st Platoon in Bamako and in 1955 was sent to serve in the 2nd Platoon of the Signal Battalion in Thiès, Senegal. In 1956, he was promoted to sergeant, transferred to a base in Kati, and was sent to fight for the French in the Algerian War in 1958. Sangare received the French Commemorative Medal of North Africa for his service.

When Mali gained independence in 1960, Sangare was deployed as part of the Malian contingent of ONUC during the six-month time period while Patrice Lumumba was in power. He was awarded the United Nations Peace Medal in November 1960, when he returned to Mali. After the collapse of the Mali Federation, Sangare continued to serve in his battalion at Kayes. He recalled that

"It was a national euphoria. We were young, enthusiastic and wanted to succeed in nation building. We were ready to move mountains to prove that we did not need a colonizer or Senegal to develop. To this end, in 1961, we, civilians and military, began building the Kayes-Guinea road. It was crazy; we thought we could do anything."

Sangare was promoted to senior sergeant in 1963 and in 1965 was transferred to the Sahara Company based in Kidal and commanded and founded the military posts of Tirikine in Kidal Region and Fanfing in Ménaka Region. In Kidal, Sangare became close friends with company commander Dibi Silas Diarra, who suppressed the 1960s Tuareg rebellion. Sangare was eventually supposed to transfer to the region to become Diarra's secretary.

== Failed coup plot ==
When Sangare joined the army, he took mandatory classes on Malian state politics, which was required under Modibo Keïta's rule. Sangare believed in developing the country under a Malian socialism and supported anti-imperalist ideas in Africa. He stated that

"It cost us nothing to go to the ends of the earth to defend our territorial integrity, the peace of our people and contribute to the development of the country."

Sangare joined the ruling Sudanese Union party and became an activist. The 1968 Malian coup d'état led by Moussa Traoré overthrew Keita and put an end to Keita's Malian socialist ideas. The Sudanese Union was dissolved, and while the putschists promised to hold free and fair elections, it became clear the coup produced a second dictatorship. Dibi Silas Diarra began forming an army opposition movement to Traore in the summer of 1969, and prepared a plan for a coup to return power back to civilians. Sangare supported Diarra's conspiracy and believed that it would put Mali back on track to socialism. However, the plot failed and Sangare was arrested by Moriba Diakite on August 12, 1969.

The trial began on December 10, 1969. The State Security Court led by Amara Danfar and Mamadou Coulibaly sentenced 33 officers and sergeants to hard labor in sentences ranging from 5 years to life imprisonment. The sentence was announced on December 17, and Sangare learned he had been sentenced to ten years of hard labor in the Taoudenni desert. Led by Diarra, the sentenced officers began singing the Internationale. They were transported to Bamako prison, and at dawn on December 20, 1969, Sangare was one of the first nine prisoners to be shipped to Taoudenni.

== Taoudenni ==
The convicts were loaded on a plane and flown to Timbuktu. On December 25, they arrived in Taoudenni, where the government intended on building a fort and more salt mines to harvest salt that had been discovered there in the 16th century. When they arrived, the commander at Taoudenni Lt. Almamy Nyentao explained to Sangare and the other convicts that he had received orders to regard them as former comrades and not to pity them. As such, Nyentao ordered the men to wear civilian clothes and ordered that they be handcuffed and shackled. Their diet was limited to crushed finger millet boiled in saltwater and decomposing animal corpses, causing widespread malnutrition and beriberi.

Sangare and his comrades took turns sleeping on mats in a cramped room, waking up at 4 a.m. under threat of whipping to build a fort later called Nyentao. Sangare and other convicts created the bricks used in the fort, and production quotas were deliberately inflated. If prisoners did not make 1,000 bricks a day, they faced corporal punishment. Soldiers forced the convicts to dance on the hot sand in 50C temperatures, and woke them up in the frigid nights to sing songs.

Nyentao ordered the prisoners to greet him as they would greet Moro Naba, the king of the Mossi. Prisoners were ordered to crawl to him saying "baba, baba". This treatment ended after six months following a visit by the director of Malian prisons Django Sissoko to Taoudenni. However, prisoners were still only allowed two letters a year and reading was prohibited.

The first of Sangare's original nine comrades to die was Tiekoro Sagadogo on February 16, 1972, followed by Jean-Bolon Samake on March 27 and Bakary Camara on May 1. Dibi Silas Diarra died on June 22, 1972, followed by Boubacar Traore on July 7 and Mamy Ouattara on July 31. Sangare witnessed the death of former Prime Minister Yoro Diakité in 1973 and the son of famous opposition leader Fili Dabo Sissoko. Sangare even witnessed the arrival of the head of the Malian prison system Tiécoro Bagayoko. Of the original nine convicts, only three including Sangare survived their sentences. Adjudan Kediuna Samake and Captain Alassane Diarra were the other two, but Diarra died shortly after his release.

== Freedom and authorship ==
Sangare was released on the afternoon of August 8, 1979. At dawn on August 14, he and his comrades returned to Timbuktu where the prison director arranged the paperwork for their release. Sangare returned to Bamako on October 5, 1979, at 4 p.m., leaving the Djicoroni camp at 9 p.m. to freedom. He suffered from PTSD following his return to Bamako.

Sangare and his wife Maimouna Keita settled down with their two sons and four daughters at 375 Laifougou District 71. He took a job at a garage in Sogoninko, although was forced to retire due to heart and physical problems after six years. Sangare devoted his time to studying the Quran and completed Hajj.

In November 1999 with the help of publisher Professor Amadou Seydou Traoré, who had served ten years in Cadale prison, Sangare published his memoir Ten Years in the Deadly Penal Servitude of Taoudenni. The book described his time in the prison, the former high-ranking politicians who he worked alongside, and the torture in it and how the guards killed his friends. The book was a success in Mali, and went through several editions. Prominent Malian politician and presidential candidate Thiébile Dramée called the book "the first and true anthology of crimes and horrors committed by the state."

Sangare became known as "Old Samba" and "Knight of the Desert", and was seen as one of the most revered Malian literary figures until his death. In his interviews in the late 1990s and early 2000s, Sangare said the rule of law was finally being established in Mali and stated he didn't wish revenge on anyone. Moussa Traore was the only one Sangare stated he wanted to send to Taoudenni to live in the climate, although without the forced labor and insults.

Sangare died on February 11, 2011, at 10:45 a.m. in the Luxembourg Hospital in Bamako surrounded by his friends and family.
