= Diby Silas Diarra =

Diby Silas DIarra

Governor of Gao Region
- In office 1967–1969

Commander of Kidal Region
- In office 1963–1967

Personal details
- Born: 1934 Mayodesso, San District, French Sudan (now Mali)
- Died: June 22, 1972 (aged 37–38) Taoudenni, Mali
- Nickname: Butcher of Kidal

Military service
- Allegiance: France (1950–1960); Mali (1960–1969)
- Rank: Captain
- Battles/wars: Tuareg rebellion (1962–1964); 1969 Malian counter-coup plot

Diby Silas Diarra (1934 – June 22, 1972) was a Malian soldier and governor who served as governor of Kidal Region from 1963 to 1967 and later as governor of Gao Region. He led the failed 1969 Malian counter-coup plot, and died in the Taoudenni work camp as a result.

== Biography ==
Diarra was born in 1934 in Mayerasso, San District, French Sudan (now Mali). He joined the French colonial army after completing his primary education. In 1960, at the onset of Malian independence, he joined the Malian Army.

Diarra was part of the Sudanese Union – African Democratic Rally (US-RDA) political party. In 1963, he was appointed commander of Kidal Region, a position he held until 1967. In 1969, Diarra was appointed governor of Gao Region and later Mopti Region.

=== 1969 coup plot ===
Diarra was an opponent of the 1968 Malian coup d'état that overthrow Modibo Keïta. Diarra began recruiting soldiers to launch a counter-coup against Moussa Traoré to restore civilian rule. At least 33 members participated in the conspiracy, and before the plan was foiled on August 12, 1969, it was laid out on paper and little else was needed to execute it. The group was sold out by Moriba Diakite, and Diarra and his men including Samba Sangare were arrested and put into the Bamako Central Prison, after a sham trial on December 14, 1969. Eladi Ag Alah, a Tuareg rebel leader initially captured by Diarra in 1964 currently interned at the Bamako Central Prison, warned the putschists of where they would be sent to next: the Taoudenni concentration camp.

On December 20, the nine members destined for Taoudenni, which included Diarra, were put on a military plane to go to Timbuktu's prison, where they were visited by Lt. Almany Niantao. Niantao would be their chief torturer at Taoudenni. At Taoudenni, Diarra and his co-conspirators mined salt in the brutal heat and collected camel droppings. Only two of the original nine made it out.

Diarra died on June 22, 1972, under the whip of a Kidalien soldier named El Mehdi. Diarra was the fourth of the nine putschists to die at Taoudenni. El Mehdi had been a victim of Diarra's ruthless campaign in Kidal a decade earlier, and had been whipping Diarra to push an empty barrel towards a well faster than a weakened, malnourished Diarra could. Diarra collapsed and did not get up. He was buried and washed by his comrades. Diarra left behind a Mido wristwatch, a pair of stained shoes, and a ring, which were all given to his family.

== War crimes ==
When the Tuareg rebellion broke out in 1962 against the Malian state, Diarra was sent up north in 1963 to quell it. Diarra led the Malian army to victory in the rebellion, quelling it by 1964 and returning to the south as a hero. However, to Tuaregs in the north, he became known as the Butcher of Kidal for his wanton massacres of Tuareg civilians in Kidal, Telabit, and Aguelhok in February 1964. Diarra and his men also poisoned wells, killing a large number of people and their livestock. Diarra also impressed many women and children into slavery.

The worst of the punitive actions was the so-called "Dibi oven", named after the Diby Diarra , who invented it. A hole was dug in the sand, filled with burning coals, and then the bodies of the executed people were thrown in and covered with sand. This is the of baking meat and bread in the Sahara. It was all the more terrifying that " dibi " in the Bambara language means "roasted meat", and it was the ethnic Bambara who formed the basis of the Malian army.

Victims for execution were chosen at random, they could be both Tuareg leaders and ordinary people. Among the famous people executed were, in particular, the marabout Sidi Mohamed Embakoua ag Oumayyata , the spiritual leader of the Iforas , Sheikh Sidi Haïballa ould Abidine of the Kunta Arab tribe , and the leader of the Dausagak tribe, Ayyuba ag - Mahomed Adargajuj.

== Bibliography ==
- Au Nom de Tous Les Siens: Diby Silas Diarra, un heros solitaire ou oublie? Diarra, Joseph Tanden and Dakouo, Victorien. La Sahelienne Presse, 2022
