= Kissima Doukara =

Minister of Defence, Interior, and Security
- In office 1970 – February 1978

Personal details
- Born: 1934 Wolocoro, Mourdiah, French Sudan (now Mali)
- Died: August 19, 1983 (aged 48–49) Taoudenni, Mali
- Party: Military Committee for National Liberation

Military service
- Rank: Lieutenant

Kissima Doukara was a Malian statesman who served as the Minister of Defense and Internal Security during the regime of Moussa Traoré. He was known for his corruption and tight grip on Malian security during his tenure, and was ousted by Moussa Traoré in 1978.

== Biography ==
Doukara was born to a Soninke family in 1934 in the village of Wolocoro, near Mourdiah, French Sudan. Doukara participated in the 1968 Malian coup d'état against Modibo Keïta, and was a founding member of the Military Committee for National Liberation. In 1970, he became Mali's Minister of Defense and Internal Security. Doukara helped arrest dissidents to the Military Committee, such as arresting Yoro Diakité and Malik Diallo in 1970.

Doukara was put in charge of alleviating a famine caused by a drought in 1974. Like many other Malian officials, he embezzled huge sums of money from foreign aid funds. Around this same time, a border dispute with Upper Volta led to the strengthening of the Malian army and Doukara's political position. Doukara and Tiécoro Bagayoko were the most influential members of the Military Committee, and notorious for their abuses. Both Doukara and Bagayoko opposed Traore's plan for civilian rule, which included the establishment of the Democratic Union of the Malian People in 1976. Traore attempted to oust Doukara, citing corruption, in 1978. Other corrupt members of the committee opposed Traore, and Doukara and Bagayoko were instead charged with planning a coup and assassination of Traore.

Doukara, Bagayoko, and Public Works Minister Karim Dembele were arrested by Traore in February 1978. Foreign Minister Charles Samba Sissoko, who had been Doukara and allies' pick for Traore's replacement, was arrested in March. Doukara was sentenced to death for political crimes, including embezzling nine million dollars in funds, but this was commuted to a life sentence by the Supreme Court in 1979.

Doukara and Bagayoko were sentenced to the salt mines in Taoudenni, and were tortured to death in 1983. On August 19, 1983, Doukara was personally isolated into a room, where Malian soldiers took turns beating him. He was reportedly unfazed, and when he did not die by torture, he was killed through "infallible means." Doukara's body was discovered on September 19 by Captain Mamadou Belco N'Diaye, and he was transported by wheelbarrow into a small open grave.
