= Keïta Fatoumata Diallo =

Malian archivist and socialite (1943–2025)

First Lady of Mali
- In office 1962 – 19 November 1968
- President: Modibo Keïta
- Succeeded by: Mariam Sissoko

Personal details
- Born: 30 January 1943 Bamako, French Sudan, French West Africa
- Died: 5 August 2025 (aged 82) Bamako, Mali
- Occupation: Archivist

Keïta Fatoumata Diallo (30 January 1943 – 5 August 2025) was a Malian archivist. She was the third wife of Mali's founding president, Modibo Keïta.

== Life and career ==
Born in Bamako on 30 January 1943, Diallo grew up in a Fula family. She attended midwifery school in Conakry and married President Modibo Keïta in 1962. Following the 1968 coup d'état, her husband was deposed and she was offered work at the Archives Nationales du Mali, though she resigned from this position after her husband's death in 1977.

Diallo died in Bamako on 5 August 2025, at the age of 82.
