= Mariam Sissoko =

Malian socialite (1944–2024)

First Lady of Mali
- In office 19 November 1968 – 26 March 1991
- President: Moussa Traoré
- Preceded by: Mariam Travélé
- Succeeded by: Lobbo Traore

Personal details
- Born: 4 November 1944 Kati, French Sudan, French West Africa
- Died: 8 October 2024 (aged 79) Bamako, Mali
- Occupation: Socialite

Mariam Sissoko (4 November 1944 – 8 October 2024) was a Malian socialite who was First Lady from 1968 to 1991.

== Biography ==
Born in Kati on 4 November 1944, Sissoko was originally of Mandinka origin. Her parents were Adama Sissoko and Wali Diallo. She attended primary school in Senegal, France, and Ivory Coast and attended secondary school in France and Belgium. In 1963, she married Moussa Traoré and converted to Islam. She had five children with Traoré. She worked as a bilingual secretary for French and English at the embassies of Mali in Tanzania and the United States and at the Ministry of National Education.

Following the 1968 coup d'état, Traoré became President of Mali, making Sissoko the First Lady. During the first decade of her husband's presidency, Sissoko took a background role as Tiécoro Bagayoko and Kissima Doukara were the President's primary aides. However, in 1974 she founded the Union nationale des femmes du Mali, of which she served as honorary president until 1991. She also led several humanitarian organizations, such as the Centre des handicapés physiques, the Institut des jeunes aveugles, and the Association des femmes commerçantes et entrepreneures du Mali. She also set up a family farm outside Baguinéda-Camp thanks to assistance from Ivorian President Félix Houphouët-Boigny.

Following the 1991 coup d'état, the role of First Lady was vacated and Sissoko was arrested and sent to Djicoroni. She was sentenced to death in 1999, but pardoned by her husband's successor, Alpha Oumar Konaré, in 2002.

Sissoko died in Bamako on 8 October 2024, at the age of 79.
