= First Lady of Mali =

Spouses of the President of Mali

- Incumbent; Lala Diallo since May 24, 2021
- Residence: Presidential Palace, Bamako
- Inaugural holder: Mariam Travélé
- Formation: 20 June 1960; 66 years ago

First Lady of Mali (French: Première dame du Mali) is the title held by the wife of the president of Mali, concurrent with the president's term of office. The present first lady is Lala Diallo, wife of interim President Assimi Goïta, who has held the position since May 24, 2021.

== History ==
Mariam Travélé, the first wife of founding President Modibo Keïta, was designated as the Mali's first official first lady by President Keïta and is recognized for her role. (President Keïta's third wife, Keïta Fatoumata Diallo, was also referred to as a "former first lady" in official statements by the military government at the time of her death in August 2025, though Travélé held this role during Keïta's presidency).

== List of first ladies ==
#	First Lady (maiden name)	Portrait	Tenure begin	Tenure end	Head of state	Notes
1	Mariam Travélé		20 June 1960	19 November 1968	Modibo Keïta	President Modibo Keïta, who was polygamous and had three wives, designated his first wife, Mariam Travélé, as the official First Lady of Mali during his presidency. She was imprisoned by Moussa Traoré as a political prisoner from the 1968 Malian coup d'état, which overthrew her husband, until 1978.
	Fatoumata "Didi" Haïdara		20 June 1960	19 November 1968	Modibo Keïta	Keïta married his second wife, Fatoumata "Didi" Haïdara in 1952. The daughter of a marabout, Didi Haidara was born around 1933. She lived in the Presidential Palace. but was not involved in politics. Haïdara died of a heart attack in Bamako on 26 July 1976.
	Keïta Fatoumata Diallo		20 June 1960	19 November 1968	Modibo Keïta	Keïta's third wife, Keïta Fatoumata Diallo, was born on 30 December 1943 and had two daughters with President Keïta. After the 1968 Malian coup d'état which overthrew her husband, Diallo worked as an archivist at the National Archives until her husband's death in 1978. Diallo was also referred to as "former first lady" by Malian government officials at the time of her death om 5 August 2025.
2	Mariam Sissoko		19 November 1968	26 March 1991	Moussa Traoré	
3	Lobbo Traoré		26 March 1991	8 June 1992	Amadou Toumani Touré	
4	Adame Ba Konaré		8 June 1992	8 June 2002	Alpha Oumar Konaré	Adame Ba Konaré is a professional historian and academic.
(3)	Lobbo Traoré		8 June 2002	22 March 2012	Amadou Toumani Touré	
5	Unknown		22 March 2012	12 April 2012	Amadou Sanogo	
6	Mintou Doucour		12 April 2012	4 September 2013	Dioncounda Traoré	
7	Keïta Aminata Maiga		4 September 2013	19 August 2020	Ibrahim Boubacar Keïta	
8	Lala Diallo		August 19, 2020	September 25, 2020	Colonel Assimi Goïta	President Ibrahim Boubacar Keïta was overthrown in the 2020 Malian coup d'état. The country was ruled by a military junta called the National Committee for the Salvation of the People led by Colonel Assimi Goïta. His wife, Lala Diallo, made no public appearances during this brief period.
9	Married		September 25, 2020	May 24, 2021	Bah Ndaw	Acting President Bah Ndaw refused to grant the title of First Lady to his wife during his brief, interim presidency. Ndaw cited the need to keep his wife and other immediate family members out of public affairs during his transitional government. President Ndaw was overthrown by his vice president, Colonel Assimi Goïta, in the 2021 Malian coup d'état on May 24, 2021.
10	Lala Diallo		May 24, 2021	President	Colonel Assimi Goïta	Lala Diallo made her first public appearance as first lady at Goïta's inauguration on June 7, 2021.

== See also ==
- List of heads of state of Mali
