= Arawan =

Arawan can refer to:

- Araouane, a city in Mali
- Arauan languages, spoken in Brazil
- USS Arawan II (SP-1), a United States Navy patrol vessel in commission from 1917 to 1918
