= Araouane clashes =

- Part of the Mali War and Operation Barkhane
Date	29 March – 6 April 2018 (1 week and 1 day)
Location	Araouane, Taoudénit Region, Mali
Result	French victory

Belligerents
France	JNIM

Commanders and leaders
	Aymen al-Chinquiti †; Said al-Maghribi †; Qouteiba Al Ansari †

Units involved
French Army; French Air Force	No specific units

Casualties and losses
None	8 killed 2 captured

Clashes began around the village of Araouane in Mali's Taoudénit Region, after French forces launched an attack against JNIM militants in the area. The initial and subsequent engagements were part of Operation Barkhane, the goal of which is to eliminate JNIM commanders in the region.

== Clashes ==
French forces fired on a JNIM vehicle in the Araouane area on 29 March 2018, killing two militants and capture one. It was later confirmed that one of the dead was Moroccan Said al-Maghribi, an AQIM-JNIM commander and explosives expert close to AQIM's regional leader and a senior leader of JNIM, Djamel Okacha.

A second engagement was started by French forces on 6 April 2018, when they attacked JNIM militants in the same area, first with an airstrike and then with ground forces. The battle resulted in the death of JNIM Mauritanian commander Ayman al-Shanqiti, along with five other militants. One militant was also captured

== Aftermath ==
In response to the clashes, the JNIM attacked the MINUSMA base in Timbuktu Airport, known informally as the "super camp". One MINUSMA peacekeeper was killed, whilst 14 others were wounded; however, 15 militants were killed and the attempted raid was repelled.
