= Karim Dembélé =

Chief of Staff of the CMNL
- In office 1969–1978

Minister of Transport
- In office Unknown–1978

Personal details
- Born: 1939 Koutiala, French Sudan
- Died: September 15, 2010 (aged 70–71)

Military service
- Rank: Lieutenant-colonel
- Battles/wars: 1968 Malian coup d'état

Karim Dembélé was a Malian soldier and politician who participated in the 1968 Malian coup d'état.

== Biography ==
Dembélé was born in Koutiala, French Sudan in 1939. He studied in military school in Kati between 1962 and 1964, where he became a parachute officer. Dembele was only appointed a member of the Malian junta, CMNL, after the 1968 Malian coup d'état. Dembele served as chief of staff in the government of Yoro Diakité from 1969 until his arrest. Dembele was promoted to lieutenant-colonel in 1976.

In February 1978, Dembele was imprisoned alongside Tiécoro Bagayoko and Kissima Doukara, the three of them accused of plotting a coup against Moussa Traoré. He was sentenced in October 1978 to twenty years of forced labor in Taoudenni, shortened to ten years in 1979. At the time of his arrest, Dembele was the minister of transport. He spent the full ten years imprisoned, being released in 1988 and regaining his rights after the fall of the Traore regime. After his release, he wrote a memoir called Transferts Defenitifs.

Dembele died in the United States on September 15, 2010.
