= Diby =

Diby may refer to:

== People ==
- Boy Akba Diby (born 1945), Ivorian sprinter
- Charles Koffi Diby (1957–2019), Ivorian politician
- Diby Keita (born 2003), Spanish footballer
- Diby Silas Diarra (1934–1972), Malian soldier and governor

== Places ==
- Diby, Estonia
