= Democratic Union of the Malian People =

Democratic Union of the Malian People Union démocratique du peuple malien
- Founded: September 22, 1975
- Dissolved: March 26, 1991
- Preceded by: CMLN
- Succeeded by: Patriotic Movement for Renewal
- Headquarters: Bamako
- Newspaper: L'Essor – La Voix du Peuple
- Youth wing: National Youth Union of Mali

The Democratic Union of the Malian People (French: Union Démocratique du Peuple Malien, UDPM) was a military-backed political party in Mali. Its main organ was the daily newspaper L'Essor – La Voix du Peuple, which had a circulation of 40,000. It was the largest newspaper in the country during the mid-1980s.

== History ==
The party was founded by the CMLN military junta to provide the regime with political legitimacy. Moussa Traoré announced the party's formation on 22 September 1975, with himself as general secretary. Upon the restoration of civilian rule in 1979, it became the only legal party in Mali.

The UDPM borrowed from Modibo Keïta's conception of democratic centralism and organized itself along the lines of Marxism–Leninism, although it never identified itself as a Marxist party. UDPM had a Central Executive Bureau with 19 members and a National Council with 137 members. As the party's general secretary, Traoré was the only candidate for president of the republic. He was automatically elected for a six-year term and confirmed in office in the 1979 general elections, whilst voters were presented with a single list of UDPM candidates for the National Assembly. This was repeated in elections in 1982, 1985 and 1988.

Following a coup by Amadou Toumani Touré in 1991, the party was dissolved in the same year.

== Electoral history ==
=== Presidential Elections ===
Election	Party candidate	Votes	%	Result
1979	Moussa Traoré	3,298,477	100%	Elected ✓
1985	Moussa Traoré		100%	Elected ✓

=== National Assembly elections ===
Election	Party leader	Votes	%	Seats	+/–	Position	Result
1979	Moussa Traoré	3,180,565	99.9%	82 / 82	▲82	▲1st	Sole legal party
1982	Moussa Traoré	3,437,505	99.9%	82 / 82	Steady	1st	Sole legal party
1985	Moussa Traoré		100%	82 / 82	Steady	1st	Sole legal party
1988	Moussa Traoré	3,615,779	100%	82 / 82	Steady	1st	Sole legal party
