= Foum-Alba Cercle =

Foum-Alba
- Cercle
- Country: Mali
- Region: Taoudénit
- Time zone: UTC+0 (GMT)

Foum-Alba is a cercle of Taoudénit Region, Mali.
