= 1979 Malian general election =

- 19 June 1979
- Presidential election
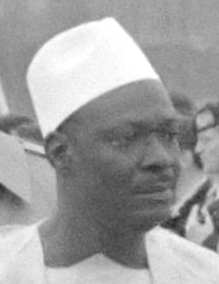
Nominee	Moussa Traoré
Party	UDPM
Popular vote	3,298,477
Percentage	100%
President before election
Moussa Traoré
UDPM
President-elect
Moussa Traoré
UDPM

General elections were held in Mali on 19 June 1979. They followed a 1974 referendum that approved a new constitution allowing for the direct election of the President for the first time. The country was a one-party state at the time, with the Democratic Union of the Malian People (UDPM) as the sole legal party. Its leader, Moussa Traoré, who had overthrown Modibo Keïta in 1968, was the only presidential candidate, and was elected unopposed. In the National Assembly elections several UDPM candidates were able to contest each seat, with 44% of the incumbent MPs defeated. Voter turnout was reported to be 97%.

== Results ==
=== President ===
Candidate	Party	Votes	%
Moussa Traoré	Democratic Union of the Malian People	3,298,477	100.00
Total		3,298,477	100.00
Valid votes		3,298,477	99.89
Invalid/blank votes		3,774	0.11
Total votes		3,302,251	100.00
Registered voters/turnout		3,397,250	97.20
Source: Nohlen et al.

=== National Assembly ===
Party	Votes	%	Seats
Democratic Union of the Malian People	3,180,565	99.9	82
Against	4,693	0.1	–
Invalid/blank votes	4,693	–	–
Total	3,185,258	100	82
Registered voters/turnout	3,283,985	97.0	–
Source: Nohlen et al.
