= Pembélé =

Pembélé is a surname. Notable people with the surname include:

- Andy Pembélé (born 2000), French footballer
- Timothée Pembélé (born 2002), French footballer

== See also ==
- Dembélé
