= 1985 Malian general election =

- 9 June 1985
- Presidential election
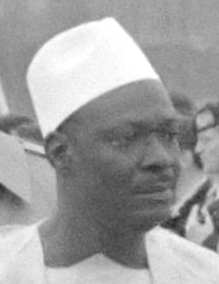
Nominee	Moussa Traoré
Party	UDPM
Percentage	100%
President before election
Moussa Traoré
UDPM
President-elect
Moussa Traoré
UDPM

General elections were held in Mali on 9 June 1985. The country was a one-party state at the time, with the Democratic Union of the Malian People (UDPM) as the sole legal party. Its leader, Moussa Traoré, was the only candidate in the presidential election, and was elected unopposed. In the National Assembly elections several UDPM candidates were able to contest each seat.

== Results ==
=== President ===
Candidate	Party	Votes	%
Moussa Traoré	Democratic Union of the Malian People		100
Total			
Source: Nohlen et al.

=== National Assembly ===
Party	Seats	+/–
Democratic Union of the Malian People	82	0
Total	82	0
Source: Nohlen et al.
