= Araouane =

- Village
- Location in Mali
- Coordinates: 18°54.3′N 3°31.7′W
- Country: Mali
- Region: Taoudénit Region
- Cercle: Araouane Cercle
- Elevation: 288 m (945 ft)

Population (2007)
  - Total: 300

Araouane or Arawan is a small village in the Malian part of the Sahara Desert, lying 243 km (151 mi) north of Timbuktu on the caravan route to the salt-mining centre of Taoudenni. The village once served as an entrepôt in the trans-Saharan trade.

== History ==
Trade routes of the Western Sahara Desert c. 1000–1500. Goldfields are indicated by light brown shading: Bambuk, Bure, Lobi, and Akan.

Between the 16th and the 19th centuries, Araouane acted as an entrepôt in the important trans-Sahara trade. In particular, the town of Araouane served as a storage depot for the merchants of Timbuktu to store their goods as they were in the process of preparation to resell to northern Saharan towns like Tuat and Ghadames. Under the Songhai Empire and Pashalik of Timbuktu, Araouane was governed similarly to Timbuktu; under a system of "Judgeship" held by erudite scholars with sweeping judicial, legislative, and executive powers.

The French explorer René Caillié passed through Araouane in 1828 on his journey from Timbuktu across the Sahara Desert to Morocco. He travelled in May, the hottest month of the year when the average maximum temperature in Timbuktu soars to 43–44 °C. He left Timbuktu with a caravan of 600 camels. Caillié (1830) gives two different estimates of the number of camels in the caravan leaving Timbuktu. In the main body of the text, Caillié states that the camels numbered "nearly 600", while the Itinerary section at the end of the book gives 700-800 camels. The contradiction is also present in the French edition. Both the main text and the Itinerary section agree that the caravan included 1400 camels when departing from Araouane.The caravan mostly travelled at night and took six days to reach Araouane, where it stopped for nine days before setting out again towards Taoudenni with an additional 800 camels. Caillié gives this description of Araouane:

El-Arawan like Timbuctoo possesses no resources of its own. It is the entrepot of the salt of Toudeyni [Taoudenni], which is exported to Sansanding on the banks of the Dhioliba [River Niger]. Its soil is even more barren than that of Timbuctoo. As far as the eye can reach no trace of vegetation is to be perceived. The camels of the numerous caravans have to go a great distance for forage. Wood is so scarce that nothing is burned but camel dung, which is carefully collected by the slaves. This is the only fuel used even for cooking. The Moors collect their camels every six days, in order to take them to drink at the wells, which are in the environs of the town. These wells are about sixty paces deep. They employ a camel to draw up the bucket, which is made of hide. A pulley is also used. The water of these wells is brackish, warm, and very unwholesome.

Some of the goods passing through Araouane bypassed Timbuktu. Caillié mentions salt being taken to the town of Sansanding and Heinrich Barth, during his visit to Timbuktu in 1853, learned that some of the gold trade also passed directly from Sansanding to Araouane. Sansandig is a town on the northern (left) bank of the River Niger, upstream of the Inner Niger Delta and 634 km south west of Araouane. Caillié was told that caravans took 25 days for the journey between Araouane and Sansanding.

=== Post-independence ===
The author and adventurer Ernst Aebi invested a significant amount of money and time into the project of regenerating this village. An account of his time there is recorded in his 1993 book Seasons of Sand.

The local NGO "Araouane Action" and the Italian multicultural association "Les Cultures" are active in the village and in 2005 constructed a school block containing two classrooms. The International Committee of the Red Cross have financed the construction of a health center.

The surrounding desert is completely barren and the harmattan wind blows sand that accumulates against the walls of the buildings. The rainfall is too little to permit any agriculture and the village is dependent on the caravan trade which nowadays is restricted to the transport of salt blocks from the mines at Taoudenni, 420 km to the north.

== Climate ==
Araouane has a hot desert climate (Köppen climate classification BWh) typical of the Tombouctou Region, characterized by a pronounced lack of rainfall and extreme heat. It lies in one of the hottest regions on the planet, in the western section of the Sahara Desert. The average annual rainfall barely reaches 45 mm (1,77 in) but is extremely variable from year to year and mostly fall between July and September, inclusively. The annual mean temperature is about 29 °C (84.2 °F). Averages highs exceed 42.8 °C (109 °F) during six consecutive months from April to September, inclusively, and reach an extreme peak of 46.6 °C (115.9 °F), max temperatures can easily reach 50°C, being one of the hottest locations on Earth.

Climate data for Araouane
Month	Jan	Feb	Mar	Apr	May	Jun	Jul	Aug	Sep	Oct	Nov	Dec	Year
Mean daily maximum °C (°F)	27.2 (81.0)	31.1 (88.0)	36.7 (98.1)	43.3 (109.9)	44.4 (111.9)	46.6 (115.9)	43.9 (111.0)	42.8 (109.0)	42.8 (109.0)	39.4 (102.9)	32.8 (91.0)	28.3 (82.9)	38.3 (100.9)
Daily mean °C (°F)	18.0 (64.4)	21.1 (70.0)	26.2 (79.2)	31.4 (88.5)	33.8 (92.8)	36.7 (98.1)	35.0 (95.0)	33.9 (93.0)	34.2 (93.6)	30.3 (86.5)	24.2 (75.6)	19.1 (66.4)	28.7 (83.6)
Mean daily minimum °C (°F)	8.9 (48.0)	11.1 (52.0)	15.6 (60.1)	19.4 (66.9)	23.3 (73.9)	26.7 (80.1)	26.1 (79.0)	25.0 (77.0)	25.6 (78.1)	21.1 (70.0)	15.6 (60.1)	10.0 (50.0)	19.0 (66.3)
Average precipitation mm (inches)	1 (0.0)	1 (0.0)	0 (0)	0 (0)	0 (0)	5 (0.2)	5 (0.2)	15 (0.6)	13 (0.5)	2 (0.1)	2 (0.1)	1 (0.0)	45 (1.7)
Source: Weather and Climate in Africa

== Demographics ==
Araouane has just over 300 inhabitants divided into 45 families. Only around 40 men are permanently resident, the others are migrant workers, mostly employed in the salt mines of Taoudenni. The small village contains three mosques: the Kunta mosque, the Friday mosque and the Sidi Ahmed Ag Ada mosque. Araouane once had a significantly larger population. At the time of a visit by a unit of the French camel corps (méharistes) in 1906, the village had between 900 and 1000 inhabitants.

== Famous residents ==
The Timbuktu scholar Ahmad Baba al Massufi was born in Araouane in 1556 but brought up in Timbuktu.

== Sources ==
- Caillié, René (1830), Travels through Central Africa to Timbuctoo; and across the Great Desert, to Morocco, performed in the years 1824-1828. Volume 2, London: Colburn & Bentley.
