= Dembélé =

Dembélé is a surname of West African origin, found mostly in Mali and bordering countries.

== People with this surname ==
- Ali Bina Dembélé (born 2004), French footballer
- Abass Dembélé, Malian politician
- Bassirou Dembélé (born 1990), Malian footballer
- Bira Dembélé (born 1988), French footballer
- Boubacar Dembélé (born 1982), French footballer
- Fatoumata Dembélé Diarra, Malian judge
- Garra Dembélé (born 1986), French-born Malian footballer
- Habib Dembélé (born 1962), Malian comedian, writer and actor
- Habiba Dembélé, Ivorian TV journalist
- Karamoko Dembele (born 2003), British footballer
- Karim Dembélé (1939-2010), Malian soldier and politician
- Makan Dembélé (born 1986), Malian footballer
- Malaly Dembélé (born 1997), French footballer
- Mana Dembélé (born 1988), French footballer
- Mousa Dembélé (born 1987), Belgian footballer
- Moussa Dembélé (French footballer) (born 1996), French footballer
- Moussa Dembélé (hurdler) (born 1988), Senegalese athlete
- Ousmane Dembélé (born 1997), French footballer
- Siraba Dembélé Pavlović (born 1986), French handballer
- Siramana Dembélé (born 1977), French footballer
- Siriki Dembélé (born 1996), English-born Ivorian footballer
- Souleymane Dembélé (born 1984), Malian footballer
- Sya Dembélé (born 2007), French breakdancer and Olympic entrant, known as Syssa
