= Taoudénit Cercle =

Taoudénit
- Cercle
- Country: Mali
- Region: Taoudénit
- Time zone: UTC+0 (GMT)

Taoudénit is a cercle of Taoudénit Region, Mali.
