= National Library of Mali =

Coordinates: 12°37′57″N 8°00′55″W

- Bibliothèque nationale du Mali (French)
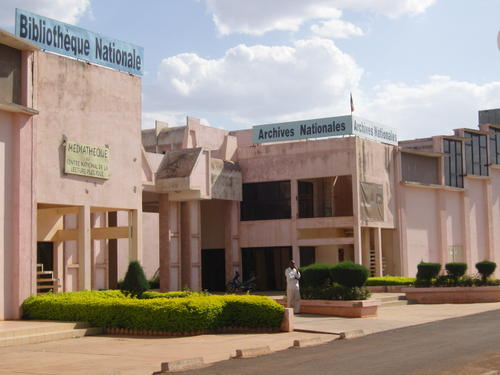
- Location: Bamako, Mali
- Established: 1968

Collection
- Items collected: Books, periodicals, manuscripts, maps, audiovisual materials, photographs, and other documents related to Mali and its history, language, culture, and people
- Legal deposit: Yes

Other information
- Employees: 28 (as of 1989)
- Website: http://www.bn.gouv.ml/

The National Library of Mali (French: Direction nationale des Bibliothèques et de la Documentation) is located in Bamako, Mali.

In 1938, the Institut Français d’Afrique Noire (IFAN) was established to study the language, history, and culture of the peoples under French colonial rule in Africa. Following Mali's 1960 independence, in 1962 the IFAN Centre in Bamako was renamed by the Mali government the Institut des Sciences Humaines (Institute of Human Sciences) or the Mali Institute for the Study of the Humanities. The collections of Mali's National Library, National Archives and National Museum would eventually all be inherited from IFAN. On 29 February 1968, the library was transferred from Koulouba to Avenue Kasse Keita in Ouolofobougou, a section of Bamako. A 17 March 1984 law created the National Library.

It is headed by the Director, who is appointed by the National Director of Arts and Culture. The former selects five sections chiefs who are each responsible for one of the library's divisions: Cataloging and Bibliography Division; Periodical and Document Division; Loan and Information Division; Acquisitions, Processing, and Legal Deposit Division; and Binding and Restoration Division. As of 1989, the library staff numbered 28, 16 women and 12 men.

Books and periodicals are available free to the public for in-house viewing, though borrowing privileges may be obtained by becoming a registered cardholder. According to the United Nations, as of 2015 approximately 33 percent of adult Malians can read.

The library hosts some of the exhibits for African Photography Encounters, a biannual Bamako photography festival.

== See also ==
- Direction Nationale des Archives du Mali

== Bibliography ==
- Marcel Lajeunesse, ed. (2008). "Mali". Les Bibliothèques nationales de la francophonie (PDF) (in French) (3rd ed.). Bibliothèque et Archives nationales du Québec. OCLC 401164333.
- "Mali", World Report 2010, The Hague: International Federation of Library Associations, OCLC 225182140, archived from the original on 29 June 2019, "Freedom of access to information". (Includes information about the national library)
