= 2018 Timbuktu attack =

Attack by JNIM militants in Mali

MINUSMA super camp attack
- Part of the Mali War
| Date | 14 April 2018 |
| Location | Timbuktu Airport, Timbuktu, Mali |
| Result | MINUSMA victory |

Belligerents
| MINUSMA: Burkina Faso; Côte d'Ivoire; United States; El Salvador; France | JNIM |

Casualties and losses
| : 1 killed 7 wounded : 7 wounded | 15 killed |
- 2 civilians killed

On 14 April 2018, militants attacked the United Nations Multidimensional Integrated Stabilization Mission in Mali (MINUSMA) base in Timbuktu Airport, known informally as the "super camp". The JNIM later claimed responsibility for the attack, in reprisal for the deaths of some of their commanders in clashes that occurred about a week earlier.

== Attack ==
JNIM militants began their attack on 14 April 2018 by launching 11 rockets and mortar shells at the MINUSMA super camp. Two vehicles carrying militants disguised as peacekeepers later approached the camp, one of which exploded inside the base, whilst the other was disabled before it reached troops. MINUSMA peacekeepers (in particular from Burkina Faso) and French troops exchanged gunfire with JNIM militants both inside the camp and outside the perimeter walls, resulting in the deaths of 15 militants and one MINUSMA soldier from Burkina Faso. Seven MINUSMA peacekeepers and seven French soldiers were also wounded. Four American soldiers protected several civilians at a market outside the camp.

The four Americans and Malian civilians were eventually extracted by a Quick Reaction Force from Côte d'Ivoire. Two U.S. service members received Purple Hearts medals after being wounded by a car bomb. It was later reported that the disabled vehicle had been previously used by Al-Qaeda in previous attacks. An abandoned motorbike with an apparent bomb inside it was also found near the base. The United Nations announced that the attack was repelled and condemned the attack.
