= L'Essor =

Daily newspaper in Mali

- Type: Daily newspaper L'Essor Hébdo Weekly newspaper
- Owner(s): AMAP (Agence Malienne de Presse et de Publicité)
- Editor: Ousma Maïga
- Founded: 1949
- Political alignment: Government
- Language: French
- Headquarters: Square Patrice Lumumba; BP 141 Bamako
- Website: www.essor.ml

L'Essor (fr. Progress) is the state-owned national daily newspaper published in Bamako, Mali. Its motto is "La Voix du Peuple" ("The Voice of the People").

== History ==
L'Essor was first published in 1949, and from 1953 was the official publication of the Union Soudanaise-Rassemblement Démocratique Africain, the leading anti-colonial political party of what was then French Soudan. Prior to independence, Bamako was home to a large number of such publications, produced by most political factions. Through the 1960s, most were outlawed, disbanded, or simply failed financially.

Following the 1968 military coup, L'Essor became the organ of the CMLN, Mali's ruling junta. In 1979, as part of the move to civilian governance, the paper was transferred to the unitary political party of the former military rulers, the UDPM. During this period, largely due to better distribution and higher literacy, circulation grew from 12,000 daily (early 1970s) to over 40,000 (late 1980s). Even after the fall of the Socialist government in 1968, the paper continued to carry articles from the Soviet and Chinese wire services, giving it an anti-Western slant. Most domestic writing prior to 1991 focused on local events and government decrees and speeches.

Following the 1991 return to democracy, L'Essor was again transferred, this time to a new government owned printing and distribution house, the Malian Agency for Press and Publicity. While managed by the Malian Ministry of Communications & Information Technology, the AMP and L'Essor retain a high degree of independence from the government.

== Operations ==
L'Essor is one of 15 French language dailies published Mali. Most are printed in Bamako, and L'Essor alone retains a national reach. Its circulation is challenged only by the two largest French language private dailies, Les Echos and Nouvel Horizon. The AMAP has its own printing facilities, which also print government publications, including the "Journal Officiel" which publishes all official government pronouncement, debates, laws and regulations. L'Essor maintains a weekly, L'Essor Hébdo, which focuses on social issues. Editorials in L'Essor come from the editorial staff and management, not the government, and press organisations have judged the paper to be largely free of government interference, a charge leveled at the state broadcaster ORTM. Journalists for L’Essor itself have claimed there is self-censorship in dealing with those in power: "Since L’Essor is governmentally owned, there are limits to what we can write about politics. But when it comes to social issues, we have a great freedom, there are no taboos."

L'Essor also has economic advantages, in that government ministries and state enterprises use its pages for their advertisements, for legal notices, and purchase newspaper subscriptions. On the other hand, it maintains reporters and distribution across the nation, tasks too expensive for private papers. All state printing and broadcast agencies receive government subsidies, and while private publishers an eligible for smaller subsidies, they must be assessed to have met certain financial, labour, bookkeeping, and distribution standards.

As of 2008, L'Essor's Director is Souleymane Drabo and Editor is Ousma Maïga.
