= Tiécoro Bagayoko =

Malian soldier and attempted putschist

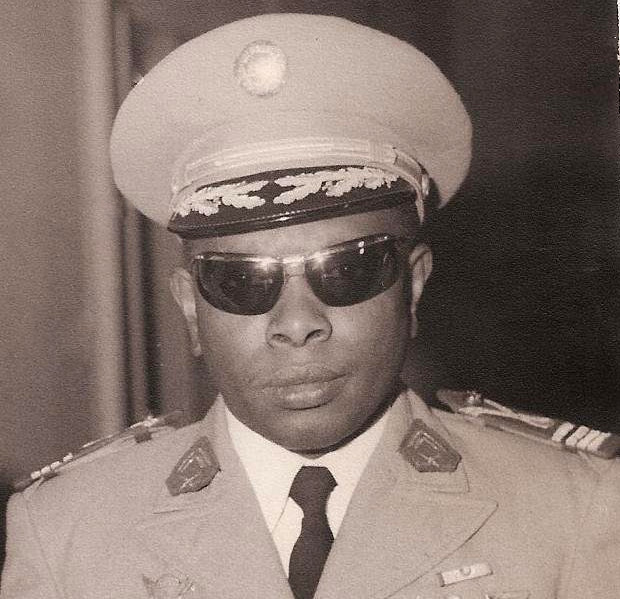

Director of the National Security Service of Mali
- In office November 22, 1968 – February 28, 1978

Director of the General Police of Mali
- In office September 19, 1969 – February 28, 1978
- Preceded by: Umar Bore
- Succeeded by: Alioun Badra Diouf

Member of the Military Committee for the National Liberation of Mali
- In office November 19, 1968 – February 28, 1978

Personal details
- Born: July 19, 1937 Goundam, French Sudan (now Goundam, Mali)
- Died: August 26, 1983 (46 years old) Taoudenni, Mali
- Resting place: Taoudenni, Mali
- Domestic partner(s): Aissata Keletigou Doumbia (1962-?); Tenimba Diallo (1970-?); Nene Bayaba Sy (1976-1983)
- Education: Joint Military School in Kati, military aviation in USSR, extra training in US
- Occupation: Member of the Military Committee of National Liberation

Military service
- Rank: Lieutenant Colonel

Tiécoro Bagayoko was a Malian soldier and attempted putschist. He rose to power as a key figure in the 1968 Malian coup d'état, becoming the director of the National Security Services of Mali. As director, Bagayoko's regime was known for its wanton brutality and suppression of opposition. He was arrested in 1978, and sentenced to hard labor in Taoudenni prison camp where he died in 1983.

== Biography ==
Bagayoko was born in Goundam, Tombouctou Region, Mali on July 19, 1937, as the son of Moussa Bagayoko and Mata Sadji Kossa, ethnic Bambara. He spent his childhood in Goundam, where his father served, later moving to Kayes and then Bamako with his family in the 1950s. Bagayoko attended a top military school in Kati. After graduating from the school at the rank of sergeant in 1958, Bagayoko fought in the Algerian War on the side of the French, where he was awarded the French Army Rescue Cross. Bagayoko returned to Mali in 1960 following Malian independence. He was sent to study in the USSR, and became one of the first Malian pilots after graduating from a military aviation school. Bagayoko returned to Mali and participated in the creation of the Malian Air Force, and then completed an internship in the United States in 1965.

=== 1968 coup ===
Following the evacuation of French Air Force Base No. 162 in Bamako, the first squadron of the Malian Air Force was stationed at Seine, in what is now Modibo Keita International Airport. Together with Filifingam Sissoko, a fellow pilot, Bagayoko contacted Moussa Traoré and Yoro Diakité in planning the coup against Modibo Keita. Bagayoko and Sissoko brought the paratropper Sungalo Samake from the camp at Djicoroni into the plot and, on the night of November 19, 1968, led groups of paratroopers intended to establish zones of control at key areas in Bamako. Bagayoko led the capture of the People's Militia, and afterwards set off towards Koulikoro with Sissoko and Amadou Baba Diarra to arrest Keita. When the president's convoy was stopped at Massala, Bagayoko was the one who announced his capture. His words, "On behalf of the Military Committee of National Liberation, I ask you to climb into this armored vehicle." became famous in Mali. During the trial of Diarra and thirty-two other conspirators on December 10–14, 1969, Bagayoko came to personally send off the first batch of prisoners to the newly opened hard labor camp in Taoudenni. Bagayoko shouted after the convicts "Goodbye, gentlemen, tourists!" (French: Au revoir messieurs les touristes!)

Malian historian Bintou Sanankoua, relying on a refutation by Traore, stated in 1990 that Bagayoko's statement was a myth. In 2007, Sungalo Samake, who witnessed the arrest of Keita, affirmed Bagayoko stating those words. Malian journalist Sauti Haidara later stated Bagayoko "turned out to be the only man who, without blinking an eye, dared to tell the creator of Mali's independence that he was no longer president."

=== Director of National Security Services; Hawk and Salopards ===
Bagayoko, as one of the leading members of the coup, became Director of National Security Services of the Military Committee for National Liberation, commanding the state security services and police. In a twist of irony, Bagayoko, who had previously reprimanded Keita for the massacre of opposition leaders, began his own crackdown on opposition leaders. Bagayoko's first actions when he took the post in 1969 were mass arrests of ministers from the Keita government, members of the ruling Sudanese Union party, members of the Union of Malian Youth, trade union leaders, and rivals from the People's Militia. In August 1969, just a few months into his tenure, Bagayoko discovered a coup plot from Captain Dibi Silas Diarra, who planned to overthrow the MCNL and return Mali to civilian rule.

The main opposition during Bagayoko's tenure were trade unionists and students, who shared pro-democratic views and desired a return to civilian rule. When students from educational institutions in Bamako protested against the MCNL in 1979, Bagayoko sent paratroopers to arbitrarily beat and whip students in Bamako schools. At a protest at the Higher Normal School on Badalabugu Hill, Bagayoko herded all of the students onto the roof and stated the protesters would be "shaved dry with broken bottles at public expense." The student protests were quickly suppressed, and police officers became a common sight in Malian classrooms.

Bagayoko was nicknamed Django or more commonly Hawk, and he personally called his opponents salopards, French for bitch or whore. Under Bagayoko's rule, the Malian state increasingly became a police state, with prisons being uniquely tortuous. The students who protested were sent to work camps run by the military, where many died. Members of the Sudanese Union were left in prisons without a trial, and many died there as well. The deserted Malian north became notorious for the work camps of Taoudenni and Taghaza. Along with the military camps at Kidal, the camps received new convicts every day. Samba Sangare, a plotter from the 1969 coup who later became a writer, called the torture under Bagayoko worthy of the Nazi Gestapo, illustrating the unique use of cutting prisoners by broken bottles and electric shocks. When prisoners in the camps complained, guards allegedly stated that the bottle cuts and electric shocks were not the only way; they could be run over instead, as "accidents as very common."

Those who did not serve long stints at Taoudenni were often intentionally humiliated by Bagayoko. Businessmen who interfered with Bagayoko's interests were sent to Taoudenni, where they were beaten, drowned, humiliated, had their heads shaved with random combs of hair left, and then returned home. Bagayoko was also accused of the death of Keita in May 1977. Rumors around Keita's death arose since it happened, and in 2007, former prison guard Sungalo Samaka accused the prison doctor Faran Samake of poisoning Keita. This was disputed by Faran's family (as he committed suicide after Bagayoko's arrest), which was never proven in court.

Officials under Bagayoko occasionally told him that people felt terrorized by him. In response, he stated "I'm not evil. It's just that Malians are afraid of me."

=== Political downfall ===
By 1977, tensions arose between the gang of three (consisting of Bagayoko, Kissima Doukara, and Karim Dembele), and Traore's government over the political development of Mali. If the country were to hold elections, the only opposition would be the remains of the Sudanese Union. All of the parties banned under Keita, with the exception of the Regrouping Party, were Marxist, a position increasingly attractive to the Malian population. By the end of 1977, there were persistent rumors that Traore's idea of returning to civilian rule was controversial within the MCNL, and that the committee no longer held planned meetings.

In January 1978, a leaflet titled "Mali, the government under the MCNL / An administration led by the Empress" was distributed throughout the country, criticizing Traore and his wife Miriam. The leadership of the Bamako police demanded an investigation from Bagayoko, who urged the MCNL to stop presenting the idea of civilian rule. Bagayoko reiterated these ideas in a second meeting at the police headquarters in February 1978.

On February 28, Bagayoko, Doukara, and Dembele were all arrested on charges of plotting a coup. Moussa Traore, on a radio broadcast, accused the "gang of three" of treason, disclosure of state secrets, slander, and speculation. Traore characterized Bagayoko with, "As for the former Lieutenant Colonel Bagayoko, in his case criticism seems useless, his machinations are known to everyone. He personified horror and slander ... [his] reign of abuse and terror has come to an end." Bagayoko's arrest led to a slew of arrests of those under him, including Mamadou Belko N'Die. All police chiefs were arrested and sent to the Djicoroni prison as well. On April 30, close relatives of Bagayoko were also sentenced to hard labor.

The trial of the gang of three took place between October 18 and 21, 1978. Supporters of the group equated the trial to the gang of four in China. Bagayoko was sentenced to death, and demoted to second class soldier. Under pressure from France, his execution was postponed and he was instead sent to work in the labor camps at Taoudenni.

=== Taoudenni ===
The prison at Taoudenni was designed by Diakite and Bagayoko, and opened in 1969. Diakite had suffered a political expulsion and was tortured to death in the mines prior to Bagayoko's arrival. Simultaneously, many of the 1969 putschists, including Sangare, were at the camps at the same time Bagayoko arrived. Sangare mentioned that while Bagayoko and the putschists did meet, the former was left to his own devices for the most part. Bagayoko occasionally complained about the work camp, equating the prisoners with "bandits and thieves", to which prison guards pointed out that he was not the first high-ranking official to be sent there.

The gang of three and former Army Quartermaster-General Noun Diawara returned to Bamako in 1980 facing charges of embezzlement. They were convicted, and received another five years of hard labor. When returning to Taoudenni, the gang of three was under guard Njadi Ould Boyda. Boyda believed that the conditions Bagayoko created at the camp were too comfortable, and ordered the start of salt mining twelve kilometers from the camp. The prisoners woke up at 4:00 am, left at 4:30 am, and arrived at the mine at 6:30am. From 7:00 am to 6:00pm, the workers mined with only a half hour break.

=== Assassination ===
In 1983, Traore decided to execute the gang of three. Malian politician Amadou Tall suggested that the reason he waited so long was that the execution of Bagayoko only became possible after François Mitterrand became President of France. In mid-August 1983, a combat group led by First Lieutenant Moussa Camara was dispatched to Taoudenni. Upon Camara's arrival, his group immediately killed several prisoners, and everyone else's work was tightened. The prisoners were now forced to carry salt to Nyantao Camp, another half a kilometer away, for an extra hour. For three days, Bagayoko refused to do the work, and told Sungalo Samaka "Never tell my children I died on the way to get bricks."

On the morning of August 19, 1983, two soldiers approached Bagayoko and told him Camara was summoning him. Bagayoko told his cellmate Belko N'Die about this and, assuming his imminent death, dressed in the uniform of Djoliba AC, which he had previously run. His last words, according to Belko N'Die, were "The good lord will meet me. He will tell me 'Since you were born, what good did you do?' He will kick me, 'Bang!', and I will go to heaven. If I die, then you don't need to pray for me, because I don't pray for myself."

After his death, (Note: Amadou Tall claims Bagayoko's death was that morning, but Bagayoko's gravestone says August 26.) a funeral team including Diawara and Samaka was brought to inter Bagayoko's body. N'Die claimed the body had signs of torture, but Abdoulaye Maiga, who led the team, claimed there were no signs of strangulation. The prisoners were unable to buy him in a deep hole, so he was laid to rest in a hole under a pile of sand mixed with salt. A metal plaque was installed on the grave, which states "Ici repose Tiecoro Bagayoko 1937 - 26.8.83"

== Pastime activities ==
During his time as head of the security services, Bagayoko was also head of the Djoliba Athletic Club. Mali was banned form inter-African matches for a year due to corruption between Bagayoko and Malian referees. Bagayoko was also accused of making each match a "symbolic confrontation between two ideologies", and for forcing senior employees in the security services in participating in football matches. As a prisoner, Bagayoko insisted on his cellmates burying him in the Djoliba jersey. He also founded a band at the Motel of Bamako, called Les Ambassadeurs du Motel. However, he used his influence as head of the security services to expel other musicians and lead singers, along with push his band into the National Orchestra of Mali.

== Family ==
Bagayoko was married in 1962 to Aïssata Keletigui DoumbiaHis first two children, Moussa and Mama, were with her. He then married Tenimba Diallo in 1970, with whom he gave birth to Mata Sadji, Fatouma, Aissata, and Mohamed. In 1976, Bagayoko married Néné Bayaba Sy, with whom he had Caty Assetou, who became famous for supporting Modibo Sidibé's 2011 election campaign.

== Legacy ==
Pascal Baba Coulibaly, a Malian politician and professor, called Bagayoko "short, but bursting with health, with confidence turning into arrogance" in an essay after meeting with Bagayoko in 1970. Bagayoko personally did not express remorse for his actions as head of security services, saying "You actually know that I did not steal anything. I did not do anything and I did not squander anything."

I reflect on the certain fatality of my circumstances, on the cruel fate meted out to those who fight for great ideas. […] One must know how to die in order to have the honor of living according to such ethics. A military man, a politician - a candidate for the dead. He who killed will be killed (emphasis added by the author) […] I ask myself if I was not devoid of reason. I made a mountain out of a grain of sand. I chose the army, I did everything to come to power, and this power sentenced me to death. […] I often say that hell is for the living, since only they can suffer. For us non-believers, this is exactly the case, we think so. Death is an eternal world. Where is Divine justice seen in this? I am not a believer, but for believers it may be there.

— Tiécoro Bagayoko,

Contemporary accounts of Bagayoko are largely critical. Malian journalist Sauti Haidara called Bagayoko a key figure of the "military-fascist dictatorship." He also called Bagayoko the right-hand man of Traore, and a leading figure of the MCNL. However, Bagayoko is also seen as both the despot and the victim of a regime that did not respect human rights.
