= Boudje-Béha Cercle =

Boudje-Béha
- Cercle
- Country: Mali
- Region: Taoudénit
- Time zone: UTC+0 (GMT)

Boudje-Béha is a cercle of Taoudénit Region, Mali.
