= 1988 Malian parliamentary election =

Parliamentary elections were held in Mali on 26 June 1988. The country was a one-party state at the time, with the Democratic Union of the Malian People (UDPM) as the sole legal party. As a result, the UDPM won all 82 seats in the National Assembly. Voter turnout was reported to be 97.8%.

== Results ==
Party	Votes	%	Seats	+/–
Democratic Union of the Malian People	3,615,779		82	0
Against	4,695	–	–	–
Invalid/blank votes	4,695	–	–	–
Total	3,620,474	100	82	0
Registered voters/turnout	3,701,006	97.8	–	–
Source: IPU
