= National Youth Union of Mali =

The National Youth Union of Mali (French: Union nationale des jeunes du Mali, abbreviated U.N.J.M.) was a youth organization in Mali. UNJM was the youth wing of the ruling (and sole legal political party in the country) UDPM. UNJM held its first national council meeting in 1979. Mahamadou Baba Diallo served as the general secretary of UNJM.

UNJM published a monthly magazine called Sukaabé.
