= Sudanese Democratic Party =

Defunct political party of Sudan

Sudanese Democratic Party (in French: Parti Démocratique Soudanais) was a short-lived political outfit in French Soudan. PDS was formed in 1945 by two French Communist Party. PDS launched Modibo Keita as their candidate in the 1945 elections to the Constituent Assembly of the Fourth Republic.
