= 1982 Malian parliamentary election =

Parliamentary elections were held in Mali on 13 June 1982. The country was a one-party state at the time, with the Democratic Union of the Malian People (UDPM) as the sole legal party. As a result, the UDPM won all 82 seats in the National Assembly. Voter turnout was reported to be 96.0%.

== Results ==
Party	Votes	%	Seats	+/–
Democratic Union of the Malian People	3,437,505	99.82	82	0
Against	6,199	0.18	–	–
Total	3,443,704	100.00	82	+2
Valid votes	3,443,704	99.73		
Invalid/blank votes	9,364	0.27		
Total votes	3,453,068	100.00		
Registered voters/turnout	3,591,716	96.14		
Source: Nohlen et al.
