= Henry Corenthin =

Malian-Guadeloupean doctor

1st and 3rd Minister of Public Works, Transport, and Telecommunications
- In office September 22, 1960 – September 19, 1969

Director of the National Olympic and Sports Committee of Mali
- In office 1962–1977

Personal details
- Born: January 21, 1924 Port-Louis, Guadeloupe
- Died: April 17, 2016 (aged 92) Port-Louis, Guadeloupe

Henry Corenthin is a Malian-Guadeloupean doctor who was the first Minister of Public Works, Transport, and Telecommunications of Mali. Corenthin was also an athlete who formed the National Olympic and Sports Committee of Mali.

== Biography ==
=== Early life ===
Corenthin was born in Port-Louis, Guadeloupe on January 21, 1924. He studied at the Lycee Carnot in Pointe-à-Pitre and then the Institute of Advanced Moroccan Studies in Rabat, Morocco. After World War II, he studied medicine at the Faculty of Medicine of Paris and was an activist in the Association of Colonial Students. He wrote and presented his thesis in 1952. He practiced as a doctor in Mali and Guadeloupe.

=== Sports ===
During his studies in Rabat, Corenthin was crowned champion in the 100 meters and the 200 meters. After the war, when he was in the French Navy, he was selected for the Inter-Allied Championships in Frankfurt, where he received the bronze in the 100 meters personally from Dwight D. Eisenhower. When studying in Paris, he joined the Paris University Club and was on its board of directors. He was a member of the French athletics team in 1950.

Corenthin founded two football clubs; the Union Sportive de Kita and the Union Sportive Indigene, both of which merged into the Aigle Nour de Bamako-coura to form the CO Bamako. Corenthin founded theb National Olympic and Sports Committee of Mali in 1962 and served as its president until 1977. During this time, he was also president of CO Bamako, president of the Bamako Football League, and a member in the Malian Football Federation. He chaired the Guadeloupe Athletics League from 1977 to 1981, and campaigned for the creation of a Guadeloupe Olympic Committee.

=== Politics ===
Corenthin was a part of the Sudanese Union – African Democratic Rally. On May 22, 1957, he was appointed as the Minister of Livestock and Animal Industry of French Sudan, and reappointed to the position on July 24, 1958. He held the position through the creation and dissolution of the Sudanese Republic and left when the Mali Federation was established. When Mali gained independence on September 22, 1960, he was the country's first Minister of Public Works, Transport, and Telecommunications, holding the position until 1962. He was reappointed minister after the 1968 Malian coup d'état, holding the position again until September 19, 1969.

Corenthin was deprived of French citizenship in 1970, with Jacques Foccart deeming him as "anti-French." In 1978, Corenthin helped found the People's Union for the Liberation of Guadeloupe and participated in the 1992 Guadeloupe cantonal elections. Corenthin sat on the Regional Council of Guadeloupe. He drafted a resolution to form a new community in Guadeloupe, but this was rejected in the 2003 Guadeloupean autonomy referendum.

=== Death ===
Corenthin died on April 17, 2016, in Port-Louis. He was 92 years old.
