= Mariam Travélé =

Malian politician (1920–2014)

First Lady of Mali
- In office 20 June 1960 – 19 November 1968
- President: Modibo Keïta
- Preceded by: Position created
- Succeeded by: Mariam Sissoko

Personal details
- Born: 1920 Bamako, French Sudan, French West Africa
- Died: 14 April 2014 (aged 93–94) Bamako, Mali
- Spouse: Modibo Keïta (m. 1939; died 1977)
- Occupation: Teacher

Mariam Travélé (1920 – 14 April 2014) was a teacher, politician and the first First Lady of Mali during the reign of the founding father of Mali, President Modibo Keita after independence. She was noted for her own involvement in the struggle for the independence.

== Background ==
Mariam was born in Bamako to Moussa Bleni Travélé, first class principal interpreter and author of a French-Bambara dictionary, and his wife Ajibiyé Mintieni. She had her primary education at the Bamako Girls' School from 1931 to 1935. She trained as a teaching instructor at the Foyer de Métisses in Bamako from 1935 to 1939 and earned teachers grade. Travélé and a fellow teacher at a rural school on the river Modibo Keita got married in September 1939. Travélé and her husband Keita worked in cities of French Sudan; Sikasso, Kabara, Timbuktu and Bamako.

During the French colonial rule in the country, Travélé and Keita led the political struggle against the colonial masters. After the dismantling of the RDA sub-section located in Sikasso and the arrest of Modibo Keita by the French colonial administration, Travélé took over the section. In 1962, she chaired the Social Commission for Women, created in the same year with the support of the RDA.

After the military coup of November 19, 1968, which resulted in the imprisonment of Modibo Keita, First Lady Mariam Travélé also spent ten years in detention, including eight and a half years at the Sikasso gendarmerie. She was released on 1 January 1978, one year after the death of her husband, poisoned in 1977 during his detention in Bamako. She was not allowed to attend his funeral.

In 1991, when democracy returned, she was elected vice-president of the Sudanese Union – African Democratic Rally (US-RDA) party, which is now known as the Malian Union for the African Democratic Rally (UM-RDA) since 2010.

== Honours ==
- Honorary President of the Malian Red Cross
- Independence Gold Medal
