= Al-Ourche Cercle =

Al-Ourche
- Cercle
- Country: Mali
- Region: Taoudénit
- Time zone: UTC+0 (GMT)

Al-Ourche is a cercle of Taoudénit Region, Mali.
