= Achouratt Cercle =

Achouratt
- Cercle
- Country: Mali
- Region: Taoudénit
- Time zone: UTC+0 (GMT)

Achouratt is a cercle of Taoudénit Region, Mali.
