= USS Arawan II =

U.S. Navy motor yacht

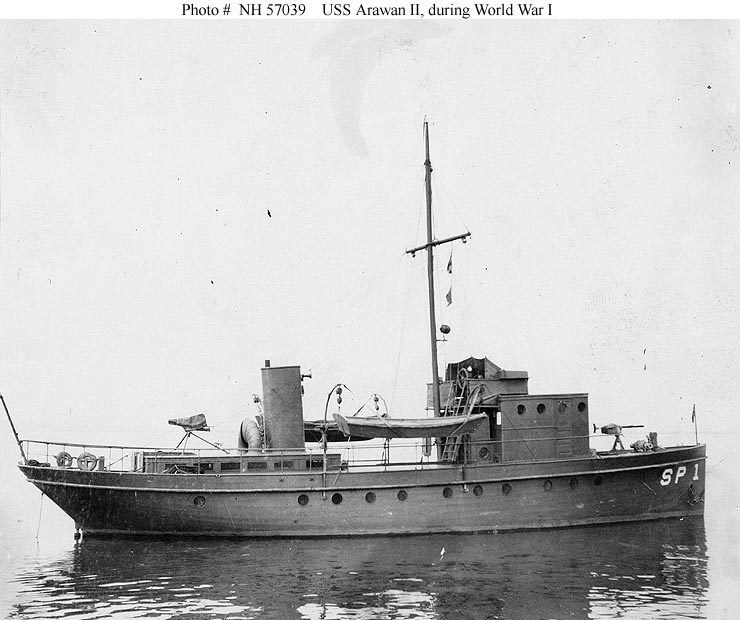
- USS Arawan II (SP-1) during World War I.

History

United States
- Name: Arawan II
- Namesake: Previous name retained
- Builder: J. S. Shepard, Essington, Pennsylvania
- Completed: 1912
- Acquired: 27 March 1917
- Commissioned: 9 April 1917
- Decommissioned: 29 November 1918
- Fate: Returned to owner 29 November 1918
- Notes: Operated as private yacht Arawan II 1912-1917 and from 1918

General characteristics
- Type: Patrol vessel
- Displacement: 61 tons
- Length: 71 ft 1 in (21.67 m)
- Beam: 16 ft 11 in (5.16 m)
- Draft: 9 ft 0 in (2.74 m) at full load
- Speed: 9 knots
- Complement: 12
- Armament: 1 × 1-pounder gun; 1 × .30-caliber (7.62-millimeter) machine gun

USS Arawan II (SP-1) was a motor yacht that served in the United States Navy as a patrol vessel from 1917 to 1918.

Arawan II was constructed as a private motor yacht of the same name in 1912 at Essington, Pennsylvania, by J. S. Shepard. In 1916, she became the first of what would eventually be thousands of civilian ships and craft the U.S. Navy inspected prior to and during the American participation in World War I for possible service as a patrol craft, and she was registered in the Naval Coast Defense Reserve; her owner, Mr. Charles Longstreth, painted her gray and used her in Preparedness Movement exercises in the months preceding the April 1917 entry of the United States into World War I.

On 27 March 1917, the Navy acquired Arawan II from Longstreth. She was commissioned at the Philadelphia Navy Yard in Philadelphia, Pennsylvania, on 9 April 1917 as USS Arawan II (SP-1), the first of over 4,000 craft to receive a Section Patrol (SP) number during World War I. Her commanding officer throughout her period of naval service was her owner, who served as Lieutenant Commander Charles Longstreth, USNRF, during the war.

Arawan II served in the 4th Naval District on the section patrol throughout the time the United States participated in World War I, patrolling Delaware Bay and the Delaware River.

On 29 November 1918, Arawan II was decommissioned at Philadelphia and returned to her owner.
