= Araouane Cercle =

Araouane
- Cercle
- Country: Mali
- Region: Taoudénit
- Time zone: UTC+0 (GMT)

Araouane is a cercle of Taoudénit Region, Mali.
