= Taoudénit Region =

Region of Mali

Taoudénit Berber languages: Tawdenni Arabic: تودني Bambara: ߕߊߎߘߋߣߌ ߘߌߣߋߖߊ French: Taoudénit
- Region
- Location of Taoudénit Region in Mali
- Coordinates: 22.7°N 4.0°W
- Country: Mali
- Capital: Taoudénit

Government
  - Governor: Mohamed Abderrahmane Ould Meydou

Area
  - Total: 292,000 km^{2} (113,000 sq mi)

Population (2023)
  - Total: 98,984
  - Density: 0.339/km^{2} (0.878/sq mi)
- Time zone: UTC±0 (UTC)

Taoudénit is a region of Mali legislatively created in 2012 from the northern part of Timbuktu Cercle in Tombouctou Region. Actual implementation of the region began on 19 January 2016 with the appointment of Abdoulaye Alkadi as the region's governor. Members of the region's transitional council were appointed on 14 October 2016. General Abderrahmane Ould Meydou replaced Alkadi as governor in July 2017.

The region is divided into six cercles: Achouratt, Al-Ourche, Araouane, Boudje-Béha, Foum-Alba and Taoudénit. The capital will be located at Taoudénit, although the government is currently based in Timbuktu owing to the lack of infrastructure in Taoudénit.

== Demographics ==
The Taoudénit Region is the second least populated region in Mali, with a population of 100,358 in 2022. Taoudénit has the lowest total fertility rate in Mali at 3.5 births per woman. In comparison, the Malian national average TFR is 6.1 births per woman.

=== Ethnicity ===
Ethnicity in Taoudénit (2022)
1. Arab (82.1%)
2. Tuareg (10.8%)
3. Bambara (3.33%)
4. Songhai (2.94%)
5. Other (0.74%)

Taoudénit is the only predominantly Arab (Maure) region in Mali. In 2022, Arabs and Moors comprised 82.14% of the regional population. Minorities in Taoudénit include the Tuareg, Bambara, and Songhai.

Linguistically Arabic (Hassaniya and other dialects) is the majority mother tongue spoken by 74.14% of the population. Tuareg (mainly Tamasheq) was spoken by 14.64% of the population, while small minorities spoke Bambara (4.30%), Zarma (3.32%) and Samogo (2.29%).

Mother tongues in Taoudénit (2022)
1. Arabic (74.1%)
2. Tamasheq (14.6%)
3. Bambara (4.30%)
4. Zarma (3.32%)
5. Samogo (2.29%)
6. Other (1.31%)

=== Religion ===
The 2022 census found that 99.81% of the population in Taoudénit was Muslim, 0.18% was Christian, and 0.01% practised other religions. Taoudénit has the highest proportion of Muslims in Mali. Islam is the dominant religion among all of Taoudénit's ethnic groups, with the Arab, Tuareg, and Songhai peoples being almost entirely Muslim.
