= Direction Nationale des Archives du Mali =

- Interactive map of Direction Nationale des Archives du Mali
- 12.638873395642504°N 8.021251480713378°W
- Location: Bamako, Mali
- Established: 2002

The Direction Nationale des Archives du Mali is a governmental entity responsible for safeguarding archival heritage of Mali, including the collection and preservation of its national archives. The National Assembly approved its creation in 2002 (decree n°02-262/P-RM du 24 mai 2002). Previously the Minister of Culture directed archives-related efforts.

== Archives Nationales du Mali ==
The Malian national archives is headquartered in Bamako on the Avenue de l’Union Africaine. Prior to 2006 it was in the Kuluba area of the city. As of 1979 the governmental Institut des Sciences Humaines oversaw the archives.

The materials kept in the archives are grouped as "old" (pre-1915), "recent" (1915–1958), and "new" (since 1958) (fonds anciens, recents, nouveaux) and organized by topic, as follows:

- A. Official Acts
- B. General Correspondence
- D. Ethnological, Geographical and Historical Studies; Administrative Organization; Deliberations of the Administrative Council; États Civils; Census; Taxes; Conseil Supérieur; Cartography and Topography
- E. Politics; Religions; Islamic Affairs; Exterior Relations
- F. Police; Prisons
- G. Education
- H. Health; Public Assistance
- J: Postal Service
- K: Railroads
- L: Navigation; Meteorology; Aviation
- M: Justice
- N. Military
- O: Property and Land Grants
- P. Customs
- Q: Economic Affairs; Industry; Mines
- R: Agriculture; Zoological; Forests; Fish
- S: Labor
- T: Budget; Treasury; Special Agencies
- U: Archives

== Staff ==
Directors have included:

- Moussa Niakaté, 1964-circa 1974?
- Aliou Ongoïba, circa 1992-2013
- Seydou Diabaté, circa 2017

== See also ==
- National Library of Mali

== Bibliography ==
in English

- David Conrad (1976). "Archival Resources in Mali". History in Africa. 3: 175–180. doi:10.2307/3171569. JSTOR 3171569. S2CID 163289168.
- Stephen A. Harmon (1992). "Malian National Archives at Kuluba: Access and Applicability". History in Africa. 19: 441–444. doi:10.2307/3172012. JSTOR 3172012. S2CID 161216102.
- Gregory Mann (1999). "Dust to Dust: A User's Guide to Local Archives in Mali". History in Africa. 26: 453–456. doi:10.2307/3172151. JSTOR 3172151. S2CID 153812227.

in French

- Moussa Niakate (1973). "Les Archives Nationales du Mali et leurs possibilites dans le cadre de la recherche". Études Maliennes (in French) (2). Institut des sciences humaines du Mali: 56–69. OCLC 875326144.
- Moussa Niakate (1973). "Les Archives Nationales du Mali". Études Maliennes (in French) (5): 69–83.
- Moussa Niakaté, ed. (1974). Archives nationales du Mali: repertoire, 1855-1954 (in French). Bamako: Institut des sciences humaines du Mali. OCLC 1616808.
- Jan Jansen (2006). "Les Archives nationales du Mali en transition". Afrique & Histoire (in French). 5 – via Cairn.info.
