= Cercles of Mali =

Administrative territorial entity of Mali

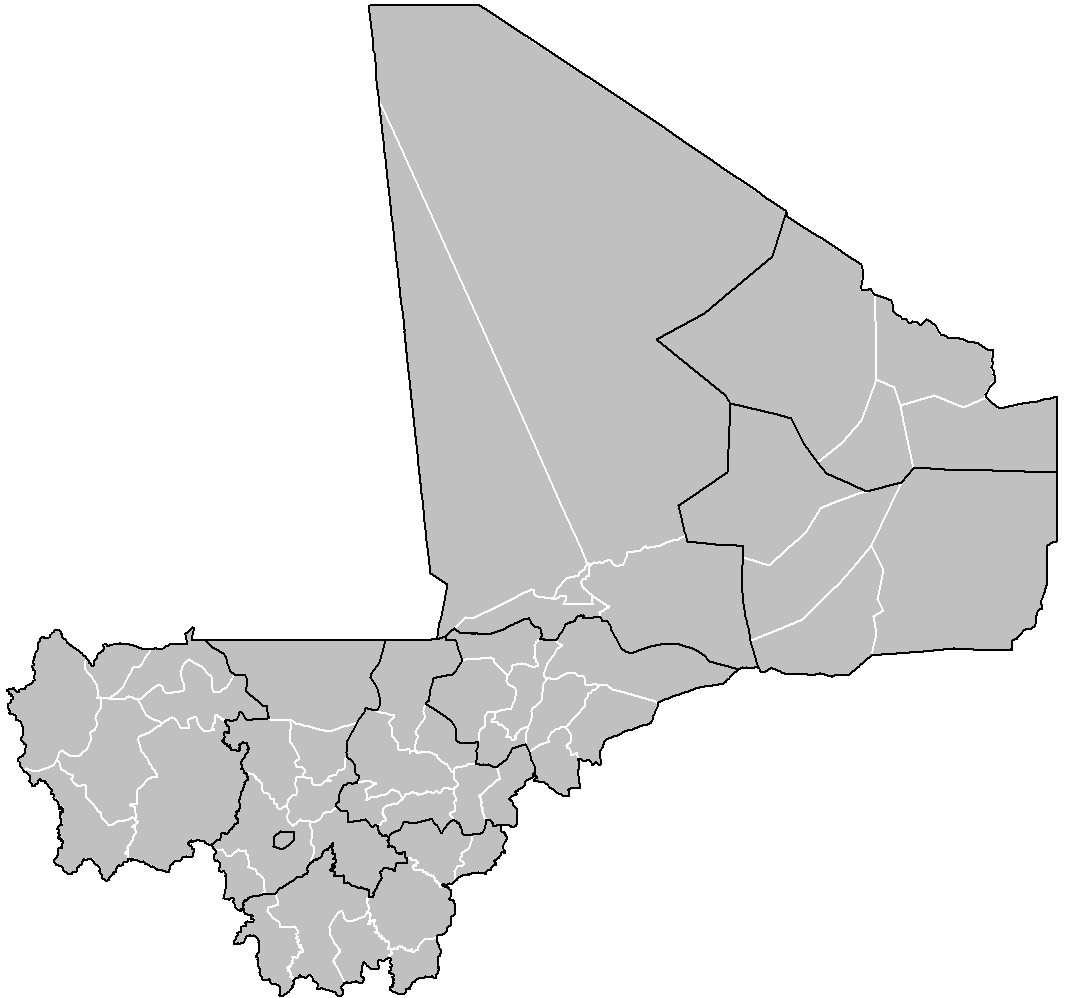
Cercles of Mali (old borders from 2012)

A cercle (French for "circle") is the second-level administrative unit in Mali. Mali is divided into 19 régions and one capital district (Bamako); the régions are subdivided into 159 cercles. These subdivisions bear the name of their principal city.

During French colonial rule in Mali, a cercle was the smallest unit of French political administration that was headed by a European officer. A cercle consisted of several cantons, each of which in turn consisted of several villages. In 1887, the Cercle of Bafoulabé was the first cercle to be created in Mali. In most of former French West Africa, the term cercle was changed to prefecture or department after independence, but this was not done in Mali.

Some cercles (and the district) were, prior to the 1999 local government reorganisation, further divided into arrondissements, especially in urban areas or the vast northern regions (such as Kidal), which consisted of a collection of communes. Since these reforms, cercles are now directly subdivided into rural and urban communes, which in turn are divided in quartiers (quarters, or villages and encampments in rural areas) which have elected councils at each level. There are 819 communes, 36 urban communes (including six in Bamako District) and over 700 rural communes. The cercles are listed below.

== Bamako Capital District ==
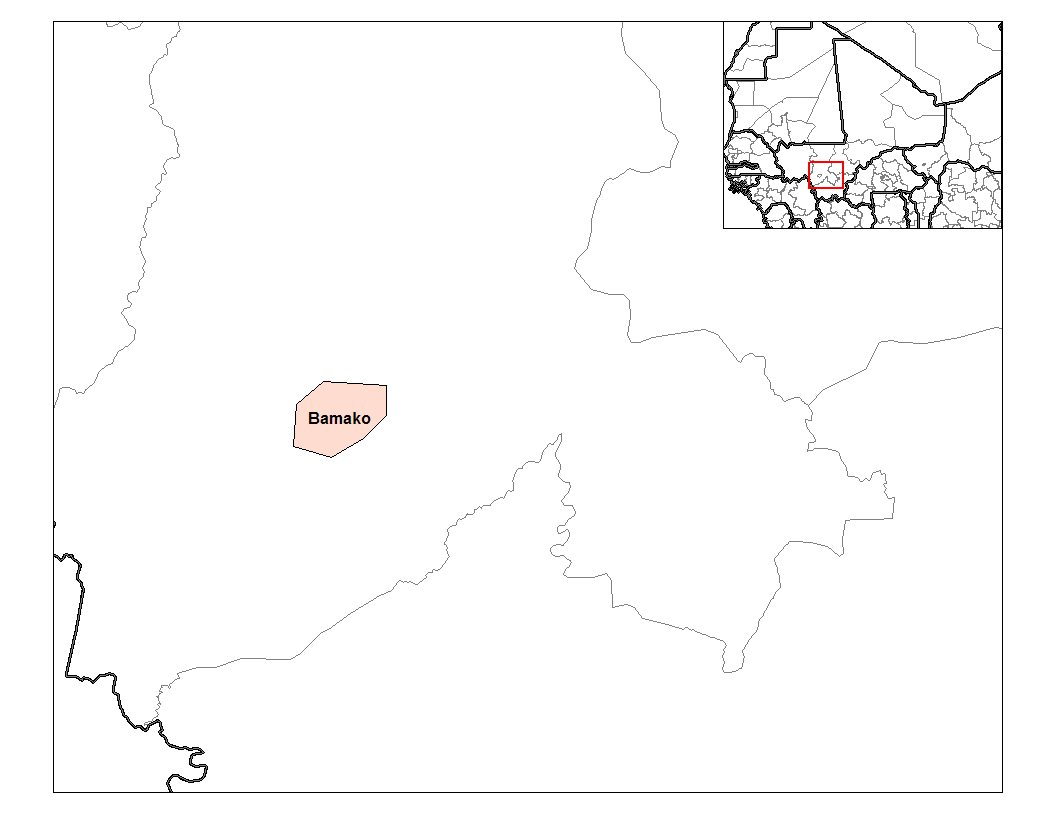
Bamako district

- Bamako

== Kayes Region ==
- Kayes Cercle
- Bafoulabé Cercle
- Yélimané Cercle
- Kéniéba Cercle
- Ambidédi Cercle
- Aourou Cercle
- Diamou Cercle
- Oussoubidiagna Cercle
- Ségala Cercle
- Sadiola Cercle

== Koulikoro Region ==
- Koulikoro Cercle
- Banamba Cercle
- Kangaba Cercle
- Kati Cercle
- Kolokani Cercle
- Nyamina Cercle
- Siby Cercle
- Néguéla Cercle

== Sikasso Region ==
- Sikasso Cercle
- Kadiolo Cercle
- Dandérésso Cercle
- Kignan Cercle
- Kléla Cercle
- Lobougoula Cercle
- Loulouni Cercle
- Nièna Cercle

== Ségou Region ==
- Ségou Cercle
- Bla Cercle
- Barouéli Cercle
- Niono Cercle
- Macina Cercle
- Dioro Cercle
- Farako Cercle
- Nampala Cercle
- Sokolo Cercle
- Markala Cercle
- Sarro Cercle

== Mopti Region ==
- Mopti Cercle
- Djenné Cercle
- Tenenkou Cercle
- Youwarou Cercle
- Konna Cercle
- Korientzé Cercle
- Sofara Cercle
- Toguéré-Coumbé Cercle

== Tombouctou Region ==
- Timbuktu Cercle
- Goundam Cercle
- Diré Cercle
- Niafunké Cercle
- Gourma-Rharous Cercle
- Bintagoungou Cercle
- Saraféré Cercle
- Bambara Maoudé Cercle
- Léré Cercle
- Gossi Cercle
- Tonka Cercle
- Ber Cercle
- Gargando Cercle

== Gao Region ==
- Gao Cercle
- Bourem Cercle
- Ansongo Cercle
- Almoustrat Cercle
- Bamba Cercle
- Ouattagouna Cercle
- Soni Aliber Cercle
- Djebock Cercle
- Talataye Cercle
- Tessit Cercle
- N'Tillit Cercle
- Gabéro Cercle
- Ersane Cercle
- Tabankort Cercle
- Tin-Aouker Cercle
- Kassambéré Cercle

== Kidal Region ==
- Kidal Cercle
- Abeibara Cercle
- Tin-Essako Cercle
- Tessalit Cercle
- Achibogho Cercle
- Anétif Cercle
- Timétrine Cercle
- Aguel-Hoc Cercle
- Takalote Cercle

== Taoudénit Region ==
- Taoudénit Cercle
- Araouane Cercle
- Foum-Elba Cercle
- Boudje-Béha Cercle
- Al-Ourche Cercle
- Achouratt Cercle

== Ménaka Region ==
- Ménaka Cercle
- Tidermène Cercle
- Inékar Cercle
- Andéramboukane Cercle
- Anouzagrène Cercle
- Inlamawane Cercle

== Nioro Region ==
- Nioro du Sahel Cercle
- Diéma Cercle
- Diangounté Camara Cercle
- Sandaré Cercle
- Troungoumbé Cercle
- Béma Cercle

== Kita Region ==
- Kita Cercle
- Sagabari Cercle
- Sébékoro Cercle
- Toukoto Cercle
- Séféto Cercle
- Sirakoro Cercle

== Dioïla Region ==
- Dioïla Cercle
- Banco Cercle
- Béléko Cercle
- Fana Cercle
- Massigui Cercle
- Ména Cercle

== Nara Region ==
- Nara Cercle
- Ballé Cercle
- Dilly Cercle
- Mourdiah Cercle
- Guiré Cercle
- Fallou Cercle

== Bougouni Region ==
- Bougouni Cercle
- Yanfolila Cercle
- Kolondiéba Cercle
- Garalo Cercle
- Koumantou Cercle
- Sélingué Cercle
- Ouélessébougou Cercle
- Kadiala Cercle
- Fakola Cercle
- Dogo Cercle

== Koutiala Region ==
- Koutiala Cercle
- Yorosso Cercle
- M'Péssoba Cercle
- Molobala Cercle
- Koury Cercle
- Konséguéla Cercle
- Kouniana Cercle
- Zangasso Cercle

== San Region ==
- San Cercle
- Tominian Cercle
- Kimparana Cercle
- Yangasso Cercle
- Fangasso Cercle
- Mandiakuy Cercle
- Sy Cercle

== Douentza Region ==
- Douentza Cercle
- Boré Cercle
- Hombori Cercle
- N'Gouma Cercle
- Mondoro Cercle
- Boni Cercle

== Bandiagara Region ==
- Bandiagara Cercle
- Koro Cercle
- Bankass Cercle
- Kendié Cercle
- Ningari Cercle
- Diallassagou Cercle
- Sangha Cercle
- Kani Cercle
- Sokoura Cercle

== See also ==
- Arrondissements of Mali
- Regions of Mali
