= Military Committee for National Liberation (Mali) =

1968 to 1979 military dictatorship of Mali

The Military Committee for National Liberation (French: Comité militaire de libération nationale) was the body that ruled Mali by decree from the 1968 coup d'état to 1979.

== Members (in 1970) ==
- President: Lieutenant Moussa Traore
- Vice Presidents: Capt. Yoro Diakite (until 1971), Lieut. Amadou Baba Diarra
- Commissioner: Lieut. Y. Traore
- Secretary: Lieut. P. Sissoko
- Members: Lieutenants T. Bagayoko. J. Marat, M. Sanogho, C. Toukara, M. Kone, K. Dembele and Captains M. Diallo, C. Sissoko and M. Sissoko

== Sources ==
- The Europa World Year Book 1970
