= Taoudenni =

Taoudenni Berber languages: Tawdenni Arabic: تودني Tawdenni
- Location within Mali
- Coordinates: 22°40′N 3°59′W
- Country: Mali
- Region: Taoudénit
- Time zone: UTC+0 (GMT)

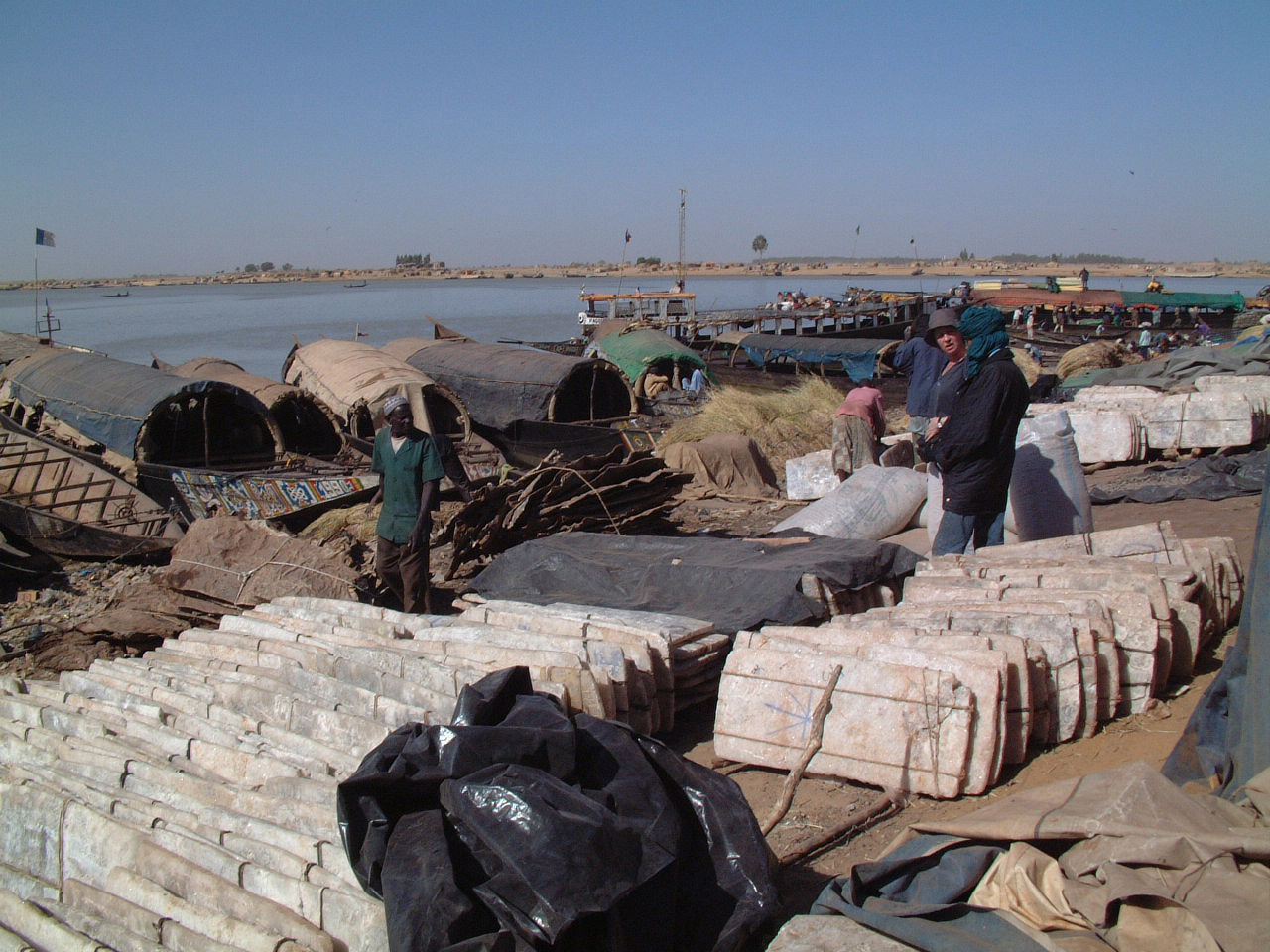
Slabs of salt from the mines of Taoudenni stacked on the quayside at the port of Mopti

Taoudenni (also Taoudeni, Taoudénit, Taudeni, Berber languages: Tawdenni, Arabic: تودني) is a remote salt mining center in the desert region of northern Mali, 664 km (413 mi) north of Timbuktu. It is the capital of Taoudénit Region. The salt is dug by hand from the bed of an ancient salt lake, cut into slabs, and transported either by truck or by camel to Timbuktu. The camel caravans (azalai) from Taoudenni are some of the last that still operate in the Sahara Desert. In the late 1960s, during the regime of Moussa Traoré, a prison was built at the site and the inmates were forced to work in the mines. The prison was closed in 1988.

== Salt mining ==
The earliest mention of Taoudenni is by al-Sadi, in his Tarikh al-Sudan, who wrote that in 1586 when Moroccan forces attacked the salt mining center of Taghaza (150 km north west of Taoudenni) some of the miners moved to 'Tawdani'. In 1906, the French soldier Édouard Cortier visited Taoudenni with a unit of the camel corps (méharistes) and published the first description of the mines. At the time, the only building was the Ksar de Smida, which had a surrounding wall with a single small entrance on the western side. The ruins of the ksar are 600 m north of the prison building.

The Taoudenni mines are located on the bed of an ancient salt lake. The miners use crude axes to dig pits, which usually measure 5 m by 5 m with a depth of 4 m. The miners first remove 1.5 m of red clay overburden, then several layers of poor quality salt before reaching three layers of high quality salt. The salt is cut into irregular slabs that are around 110 cm x 45 cm by 5 cm in thickness and weigh around 30 kg. Two of the high quality layers are of sufficient thickness to be split in half, so that 5 slabs can be produced from the three layers. Having removed the salt from the base area of the pit, the miners excavate horizontally to create galleries from which additional slabs can be obtained.

As each pit is exhausted another is dug, so there are now thousands of pits spread over a wide area. Over the centuries salt has been extracted from three distinct areas of the depression, with each successive area located further to the south west. The three areas can be seen clearly on satellite photographs. At the time of Édouard Cortier's visit in 1906 the mining area was 3 km south of the ksar; in the 1950s, the active mines were located in an area 5 km from the ksar, while the current mines are at a distance of 9 km.

In 2007-2008, there were around 350 teams of miners, with each team usually consisting of an experienced miner with 2 labourers, giving a total of around 1,000 men. The men live in primitive huts constructed from blocks of inferior quality salt and work at the mines from October to April, avoiding the hottest months of the year, when only about 10 of them remain.

The slabs are transported across the desert via the oasis of Araouane to Timbuktu. In the past, they were always carried by camel, but recently some of the salt has been moved by four-wheel drive trucks. By camel the journey to Timbuktu takes around three weeks, with each camel carrying either four or five slabs. The typical arrangement is that for each four slabs transported to Timbuktu, one is for the miners and the other three are payment for the camel owners.

Up to the middle of the 20th century, the salt was transported in two large camel caravans (azalaï), one leaving Timbuktu in early November and a second leaving Timbuktu in late March, at the end of the season. Horace Miner, an American anthropologist who spent seven months in the town, estimated that in 1939-40, the winter caravan consisted of more than 4,000 camels and that the total production amounted to 35,000 slabs of salt. Jean Clauzel records that the number of slabs reaching Timbuktu increased from 10,515 in 1926 to 160,000 (4800 t) in 1957–1958. However, in the early 1970s the production decreased, and at the end of the decade was between 50,000 and 70,000 slabs.

== Prison ==
A military post and a prison were built at Taoudenni in 1969 during the regime of Moussa Traoré. The prison was used to detain political prisoners until 1988, when it was closed. Many of the prisoners were government officials who had been accused of plotting against the regime. The prisoners worked in the salt mines and many of them died. To the east of the ruins of the prison building is a cemetery containing 140 individual graves, of which only a dozen have names. They include:

- Yoro Diakité, head of the first provisional government following the coup of 19 November 1968, who died in 1973.
- Tiécoro Bagayoko, head of security services from 1968 to 1978, who died in August 1983.
- Kissima Doukara, Minister of Defence 1968–1978.
- Youssouf Balla Sylla, police chief of the 3rd Arrondissement of Bamako.
- Jean Bolon Samaké, head of the Goundam Cercle in 1969, who died in 1973.

== Climate ==
Taoudenni is a remote site in one of the planet's hottest regions, located over a hundred and sixty kilometres from the nearest inhabited location of any size. The region is located in the middle of the Sahara Desert, in the southern part of the Tanezrouft (one of the harshest areas on the planet, known for extreme heat and aridity), and features an extreme version of the hot desert climate (Köppen climate classification BWh). The region features a torrid, hyper-arid climate with unbroken sunshine all year long. Average high temperatures exceed 40 °C (104 °F) from April to September and reach an extreme peak of 47.9 °C (118.2 °F) in July, the highest value for such an elevation above sea level. Winters are also very warm compared to the world average. High temperatures average close to 27 °C (80.6 °F) in the coolest month. The mean annual daily temperature is around 29 °C (84.2 °F) and the annual average high is 37.8 °C (100.0 °F), one of the highest in the world. The annual average rainfall is between 1 cm (0.39 in) and 2 cm (0.78 in) which mainly falls from July to September because of the Intertropical Convergence Zone's influence on its climate. On average, Taoudenni sees 3,700 hours of bright sunshine annually, with 84% of daytime hours being sunny. The site is also located in one of the driest regions on the globe.

Climate data for Taoudenni
| Month | Jan | Feb | Mar | Apr | May | Jun | Jul | Aug | Sep | Oct | Nov | Dec | Year |
|---|---|---|---|---|---|---|---|---|---|---|---|---|---|
| Mean daily maximum °C (°F) | 26.2 (79.2) | 30 (86) | 32.5 (90.5) | 39.8 (103.6) | 42.6 (108.7) | 46.7 (116.1) | 47.9 (118.2) | 46.6 (115.9) | 44.1 (111.4) | 38.6 (101.5) | 31.6 (88.9) | 26.4 (79.5) | 37.8 (100.0) |
| Daily mean °C (°F) | 18.1 (64.6) | 21.1 (70.0) | 24.4 (75.9) | 29.8 (85.6) | 33.1 (91.6) | 37.2 (99.0) | 38.8 (101.8) | 37.8 (100.0) | 35.9 (96.6) | 30.4 (86.7) | 23.9 (75.0) | 18.6 (65.5) | 28.2 (82.8) |
| Mean daily minimum °C (°F) | 9.9 (49.8) | 12.2 (54.0) | 16.3 (61.3) | 19.8 (67.6) | 23.6 (74.5) | 27.6 (81.7) | 29.6 (85.3) | 29 (84) | 27.6 (81.7) | 22.1 (71.8) | 16.2 (61.2) | 10.8 (51.4) | 20.4 (68.7) |
| Average precipitation mm (inches) | 0.5 (0.02) | 0.1 (0.00) | 0.0 (0.0) | 0.2 (0.01) | 0.2 (0.01) | 0.4 (0.02) | 3.0 (0.12) | 8.5 (0.33) | 5.4 (0.21) | 1.6 (0.06) | 0.5 (0.02) | 0.4 (0.02) | 20.8 (0.82) |
| Average precipitation days | 0.0 | 0.0 | 0.0 | 0.0 | 0.0 | 0.0 | 0.9 | 1.8 | 0.6 | 0.0 | 0.0 | 0.0 | 3.3 |
| Average relative humidity (%) | 33.5 | 29.1 | 25.6 | 23.1 | 23.5 | 28.9 | 35.8 | 43.0 | 40.4 | 31.4 | 32.3 | 34.2 | 31.7 |
Source: Weatherbase

== See also ==
- Taoudeni basin
- Taghaza
- Chenachène
