= Modibo Keïta =

First President of Mali from 1960 to 1968

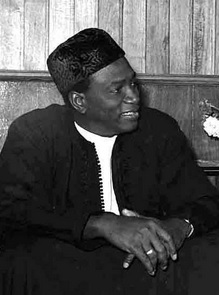
- Keïta in 1966

1st President of Mali
- In office 20 June 1960 – 19 November 1968
- Preceded by: Office established
- Succeeded by: Moussa Traoré

1st Prime Minister of Mali
- In office 20 June 1960 – 1965
- Preceded by: Office established
- Succeeded by: Yoro Diakité (1968)

President of Mali Federation
- In office 17 January 1960 – 20 August 1960
- Preceded by: Office Established
- Succeeded by: Office abolished

Personal details
- Born: 4 June 1915 Bamako Coura, Upper Senegal and Niger
- Died: 16 May 1977 (aged 61) Bamako, Mali
- Citizenship: France (1915–1960); Mali (1960–1977)
- Party: Sudanese Union – African Democratic Rally
- Spouses: Mariam Travélé (m. 1939) Fatoumata "Didi" Haïdara (m. 1952; died 1976): Fatoumata Diallo later known as Keïta Fatoumata Diallo

Modibo Keïta (4 June 1915 – 16 May 1977) was a Malian politician who served as the first President of Mali from 1960 to 1968. He espoused a form of African socialism. He was deposed in a coup d'état in 1968 by Moussa Traoré.

Born and raised in Bamako, Keïta began a career as a teacher in 1936 under French colonial rule before entering politics during the 1940s. In 1945, he co-founded the Sudanese Union (US) with Mamadou Konaté which became part of the African Democratic Rally (RDA) the following year to form the US-RDA. Being elected to several positions, his political prominence grew in the 1950s, and in 1959, he became Prime Minister of the Mali Federation, a short-lived federation of Mali and Senegal. Following the federation's collapse in 1960, Mali became an independent state, and Keïta became the new country's inaugural president.

As President, Keïta soon established the US-RDA as the only official party, and began implementing socialist policies based on extensive nationalization. In foreign affairs, Keïta supported the Non-Aligned Movement and maintained strong relations with the West despite his socialist leanings. A leading Pan-Africanist, he played important roles in the drafting of the charter of the Organization of African Unity and the negotiation the 1963 Bamako Accords, which ended the Sand War between Morocco and Algeria.

During the late 1960s, dissatisfaction with his regime grew due to progressive economic decline and his repressive responses to dissent. He was overthrown in the 1968 Malian coup d'état by Moussa Traoré, who succeeded him as president and sent him to prison, where he died in 1977.

== Early and personal life ==
Keïta was born in Bamako-Coura, a neighborhood of Bamako, which was at the time the capital of French Sudan. His family were Malian Muslims who claimed direct descent from the Keita dynasty, the founders of the medieval Mali Empire. His nickname after primary schooling was Modo. He was educated in Bamako and at the école normale William-Ponty in Dakar, where he was top of his class. Beginning in 1936, he worked as a teacher in Bamako, Sikasso and Tombouctou. He married Mariam Travélé, who was also a teacher, in September 1939.

=== Marriages ===
Modibo Keïta was polygamous with three wives. He married his first wife, Mariam Travélé, in September 1939. Travélé was recognized as the First Lady of Mali upon the country's independence in 1960. Former First Lady Travélé died in 2014.

He and his second wife, Fatoumata "Didi" Haïdara, married in 1952. She died in 1976.

In 1959, Modibo Keïta married his third wife, Fatoumata Diallo, also known Fanto Diallo or Keïta Fatoumata Diallo (30 January 1943 – 5 August 2025). Keïta and Diallo had two daughters. Diallo died in Bamako on 5 August 2025 at the age of 82. President Assimi Goïta's transitional military government also referred to her as the "former First Lady of Mali" in official statements issued by Minister of Territorial Administration and Decentralization Major General Abdoulaye Maïga at the time of her death in August 2025.

== Entering politics ==
Modibo Keïta was involved in various associations. In 1937, he was the coordinator of the art and theater group. Along with Ouezzin Coulibaly, he helped found the Union of French West African Teachers.

Keïta joined the Communist Study Groups (GEC) cell in Bamako.

In 1943, he founded the L'oeil de Kénédougou, a magazine critical of colonial rule. This led to his imprisonment for three weeks in 1946 at the Prison de la Santé in Paris.

In 1945 Keïta was a candidate for the Constituent Assembly of the French Fourth Republic, supported by GEC and the Sudanese Democratic Party. Later the same year, he and Mamadou Konaté founded the Bloc soudanais, which developed into the Sudanese Union.

== Political life ==
In October 1946, the African Democratic Rally (RDA) was created at a conference in Bamako of delegates from across French Africa. While the coalition was led by Félix Houphouët-Boigny, Keïta assumed the post of RDA Secretary-General in French Sudan, and head of the Soudanese affiliate: the US-RDA. In 1948, he was elected general councilor of French Sudan. In 1956, he was elected mayor of Bamako and became a member of the National Assembly of France. He twice served as secretary of state in the governments of Maurice Bourgès-Maunoury and Félix Gaillard. Modibo Keïta became the premier of Mali Federation in 1959. He was elected constituent assembly president of the Mali Federation on 20 July 1960, which consisted of French Sudan and Senegal. Senegal would later leave the federation.

== President of Mali ==
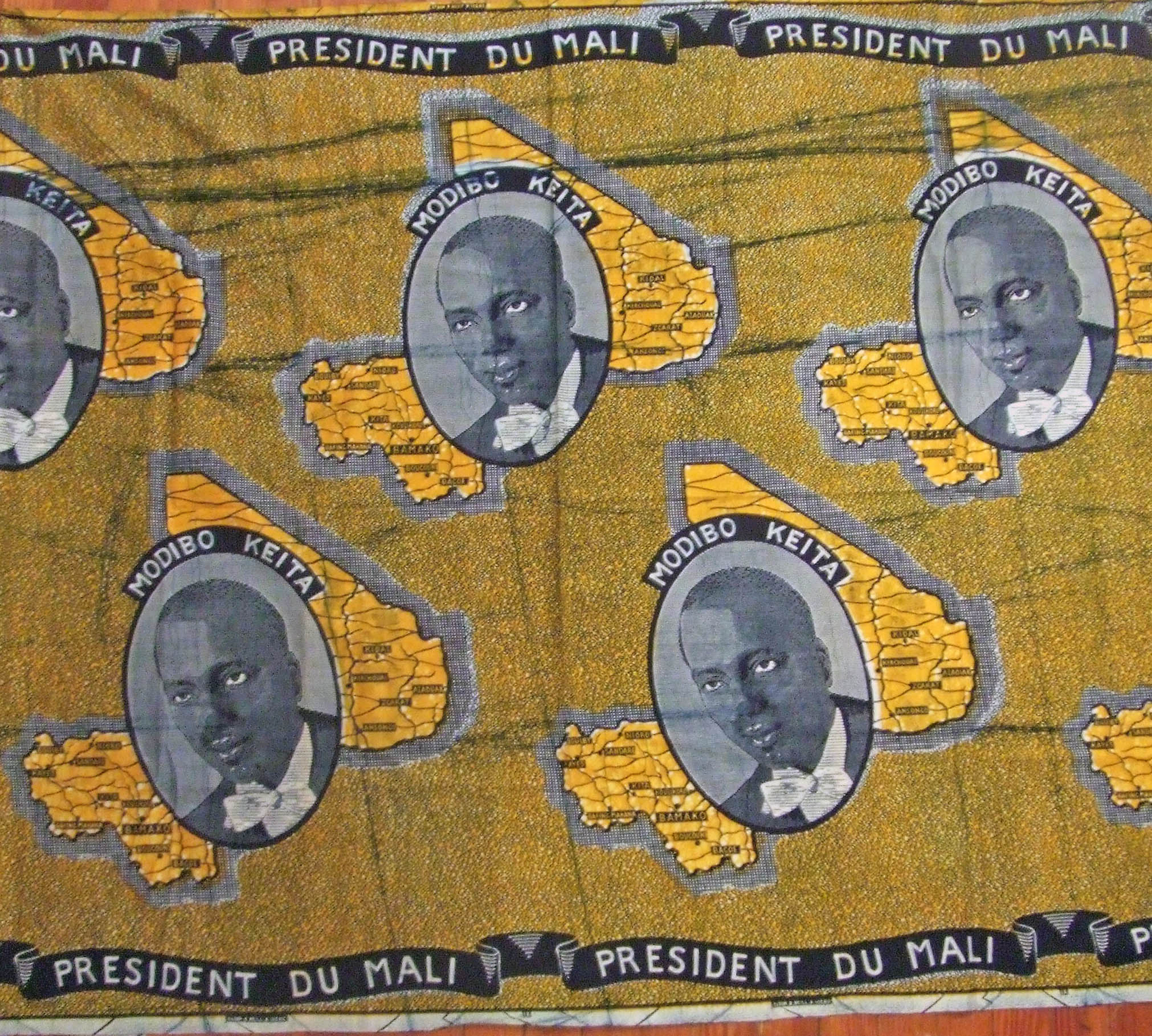
1960s commemorative wraps with Keïta's portrait

After the collapse of the Mali Federation, the US-RDA proclaimed the Sudanese Republic's complete independence as the Republic of Mali. Keïta became its first president, and soon afterward declared the US-RDA to be the only legal party.

President Keïta, whose Sudanese Union-African Democratic Rally (US-RDA) party had dominated pre-independence politics (as a member of the African Democratic Rally), moved quickly to declare a single-party state and to pursue a socialist policy based on extensive nationalization. As president, he tasked the ruling political party, the Sudanese Union – African Democratic Rally, with pursuing a policy of consolidating state power in order to modernize the country. The party's ideology was typical of African countries that had gained independence - a synthesis of leftist ideas, including Marxism, an emphasis on national traditions, and Islamism. Keïta withdrew from the French Community and also had close ties to the Eastern bloc. A continuously deteriorating economy led to a decision to rejoin the Franc Zone in 1967 and modify some of the economic excesses.

As a socialist, he led his country towards the progressive socialization of the economy; at first starting with agriculture and trade, then in October 1960 creating the SOMIEX (Malian Import and Export Company), which had a monopoly over the exports of the products of Mali, as well as manufactured and food imports (e.g. sugar, tea, powdered milk) and their distribution inside the country. The establishment of the Malian franc in 1962, and the difficulties of provisioning, resulted in a severe inflation and dissatisfaction of the population, particularly the peasants and the businessmen. The authorities were also trying to introduce tough anti-slavery policies, which persisted in some parts of the country despite the official ban.

In June 1961, he paid a state visit to the United Kingdom, where Queen Elizabeth II invested him as an honorary Knight Grand Cross of the Order of Saint Michael and Saint George. Although Keïta was initially viewed with some wariness by the United States because of his socialist views, he made it clear that he sought good relations with Washington. In September 1961, he travelled to America in the company of President Sukarno and met with President John F. Kennedy. Keïta, afterward, felt that he had a friend in Kennedy. He travelled to the United States after the 1st Summit of the Non-Aligned Movement in Belgrade, FPR Yugoslavia where the conference delegated him with expressing their common positions to the American administration.

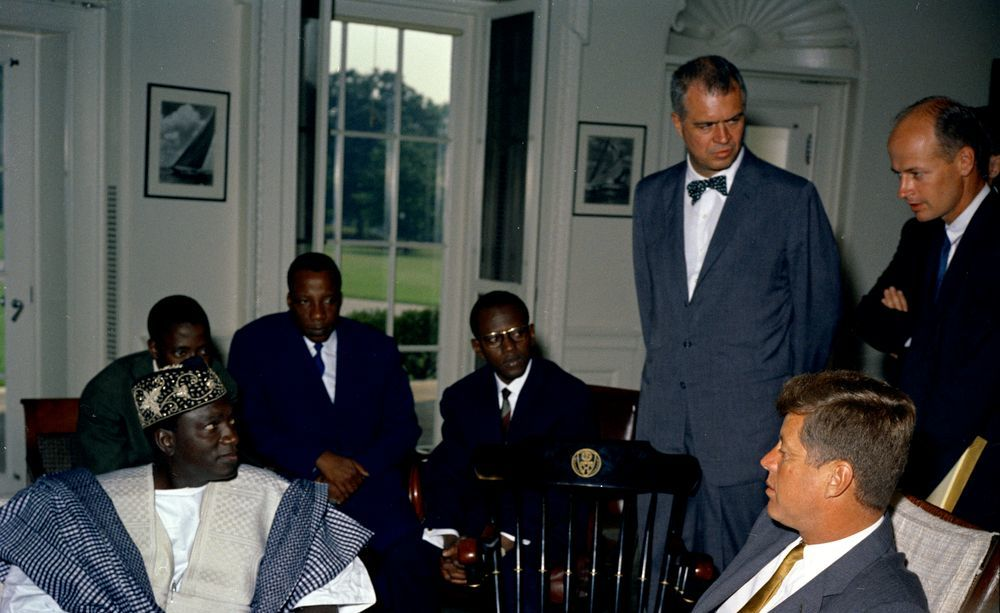
Modibo Keïta meeting with President Kennedy at the White House in 1961

He also resolved the Conflict between Morocco and Algeria and would also try to form a union between Ghana, and Guinea and worked tirelessly to improve relations with the countries of Senegal. He would also win the Lenin Peace Prize for his attempts on rebuilding the economy of Mali with socialism. However Mali was dealing with financial and economic problems, made worse by an especially poor harvest in 1968 which would later lead to a coup.

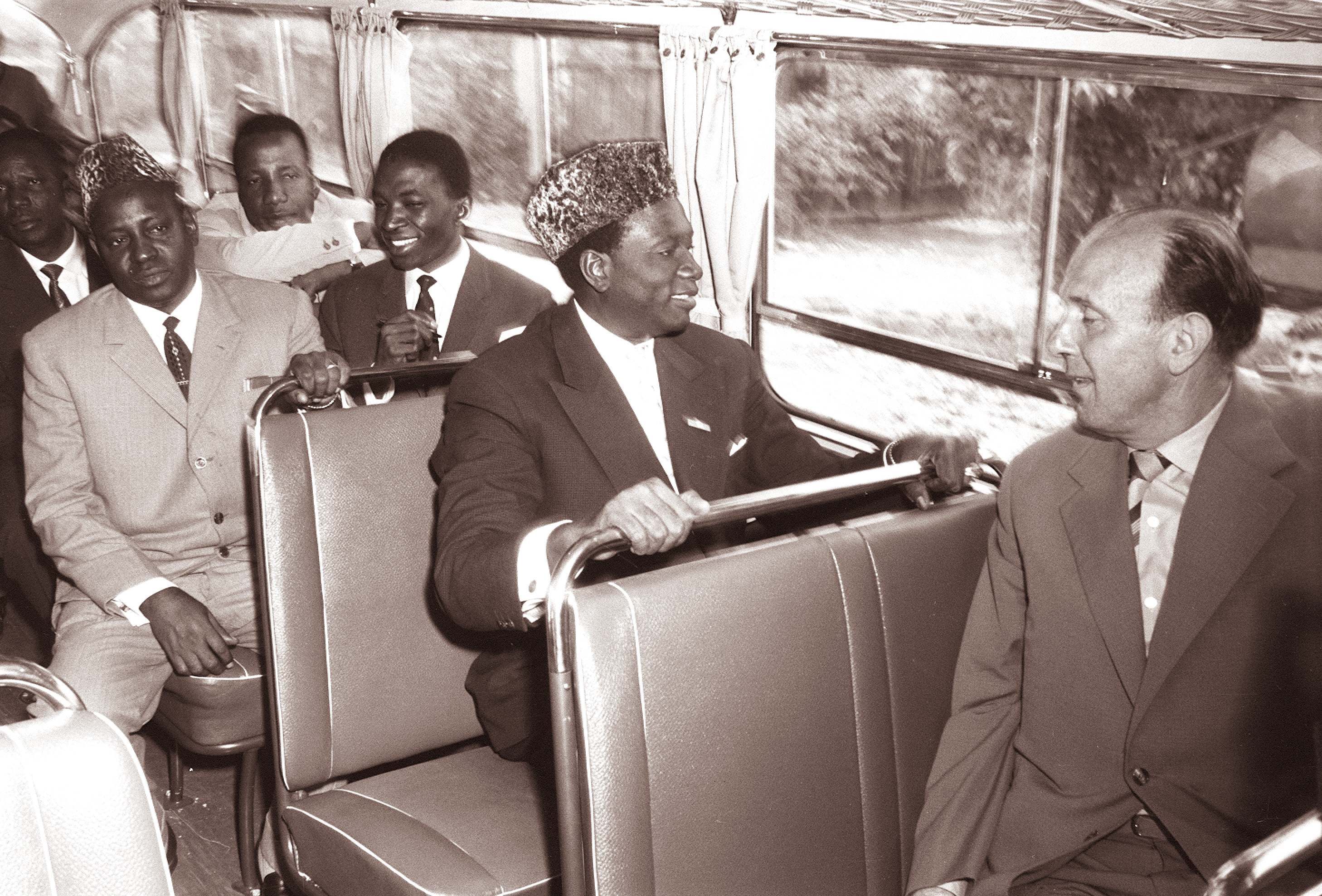
The President Modibo Keita visited the Maribor Automobile and Motorcycle Factory in 1961

On the political level, Modibo Keïta quickly imprisoned opponents like Fily Dabo Sissoko. Those who tried to create new political parties and opposition groups were also arrested and imprisoned. The first post-independence elections, in 1964, saw a single list of 80 US-RDA candidates returned to the National Assembly, and Keïta was duly reelected to another term as president by the legislature. From 22 August 1967, he started the "revolution active" and suspended the constitution by creating the National Committee for the Defense of the Revolution (Comité national de défense de la révolution, CNDR). The exactions of the "milice populaire" (the US-RDA militia) brought general unrest. Further unrest was brought along in December 1967 with the devaluation of the Malian franc by 50% after it had been equal to the CFA franc since its introduction in July 1962.

On 19 November 1968, General Moussa Traoré overthrew Modibo Keïta in a coup d'état, and sent him to prison in the northern Malian town of Kidal.

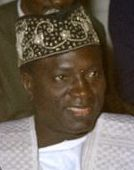
Keïta in 1961.

After being transferred back to the capital Bamako in February 1977 in what was claimed to be an action by the government towards national reconciliation in preparation for his release, Modibo Keïta died, still a prisoner, on May 16, 1977. His reputation was rehabilitated in 1992 following the overthrow of Moussa Traoré and subsequent elections of president Alpha Oumar Konaré. A monument to Modibo Keïta was dedicated in Bamako on June 6, 1999.

== As a Pan-Africanist ==
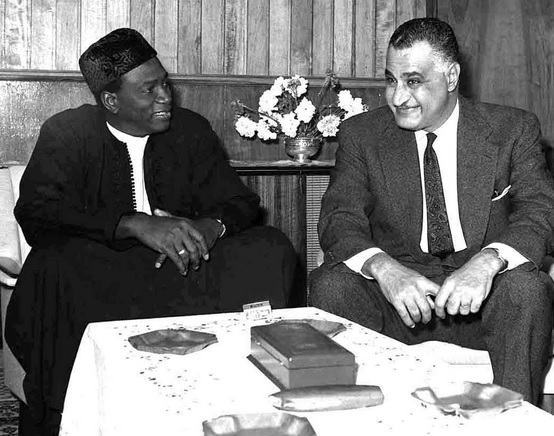
Keita and Egyptian President Gamal Abdel Nasser (right) in Addis Ababa for the Organisation of African Unity conference, November 1966

Modibo Keïta devoted his entire life to African unity. He first played a part in the creation of the Federation of Mali with Léopold Sédar Senghor. After its collapse, he moved away from Léopold Sédar Senghor, but with Sékou Touré, the president of Guinea, and Kwame Nkrumah, the President of Ghana, he formed the Union of the States of Western Africa. In 1963, he played an important role in drafting the charter of the Organization of African Unity (OAU).

In 1963, he invited the king of Morocco and the president of Algeria to Bamako, in the hope of ending the Sand War, a frontier conflict between the two nations. Along with Emperor Haile Selassie of Ethiopia, Keïta was successful in negotiating the Bamako Accords, which brought an end to the conflict. As a result, he won the Lenin Peace Prize that year.

From 1963 to 1966, he normalized relations with the countries of Senegal, Upper Volta and Côte d'Ivoire. An advocate of the Non-Aligned Movement, Modibo defended the nationalist movements like the Algerian National Liberation Front (FLN).

== In literature ==
Malian author Massa Makan Diabaté satirizes Keïta's presidency in his 1979 novel Le boucher de Kouta (The Butcher of Kouta), which features a socialist, dictatorial president named "Bagabaga Daba" (literally, "ant with a big mouth"), who is later removed by a military coup.
