= 1968 Malian coup d'état =

Military coup

Date	November 19, 1968
Location	Bamako, Mali
Result	Coup d'état successful: Modibo Keïta ousted; Moussa Traoré took control of the country

Belligerents
Government of Mali	Junior officers of the Army

Commanders and leaders
Modibo Keïta	Moussa Traoré; Tiécoro Bagayoko; Kissima Dukara; Youssouf Traoré; Filiping Sissoko; Soungalo Samaké

The 1968 Malian coup d'état was a bloodless military coup in Mali staged on 19 November 1968 against the government of President Modibo Keïta. The coup was led by Lieutenant (later Major General) Moussa Traoré, who then became the head of state.

== Background ==
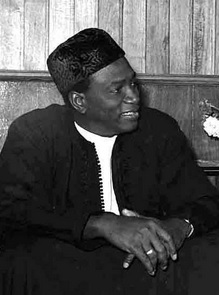
President Modibo Keïta in 1966

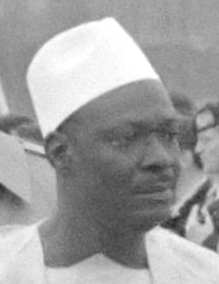
The leader of the putschists, Moussa Traoré, in 1989.

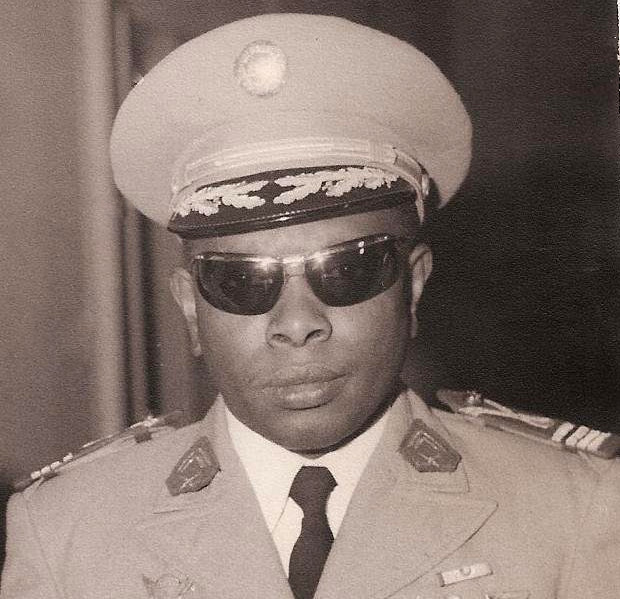
Another putschist, Tiécoro Bagayoko, in the 1970s.

President Keïta, father of Malian independence, had ruled a socialist government since 1960, supported by his party, the Sudanese Union – African Democratic Rally (US-RDA). However, his politics faced economic difficulties. In 1966, he suspended the constitution and the parliament, replaced by a Comité National de Défense de la Révolution with full powers. The population was increasingly dissatisfied by the government. A coup was plotted by Malian junior officers, in particular lieutenants Moussa Traoré, Tiécoro Bagayoko, Kissima Doukara, Youssouf Traoré and Filifing Sissoko, and non-commissioned officers such as adjudant-chef Soungalo Samaké. The Malian senior officers had little or no control on their subordinates.

Unlike many putsches in French former colonies, this one was not supported by foreign actors. The two prominent organizers of pro-Western coups in Africa, Houphouët-Boigny, President of Ivory Coast, and Jacques Foccart, adviser for African affairs of Charles de Gaulle, President of France, were surprised by the coup.

== The coup ==
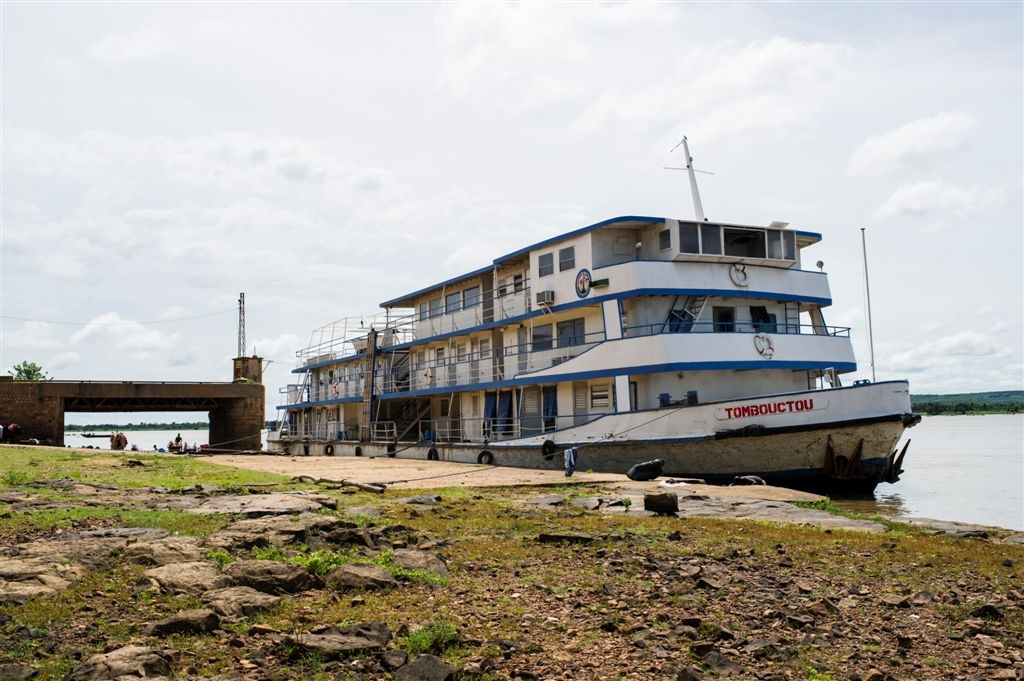
The military tried to arrest President Keïta at Koulikoro Harbor. Pictured is the Tombouctou, sister-ship of Keïta's Général Abdoulaye Soumaré, docked in Koulikoro.

During the night of November 18–19, at midnight, the putschists gathered the Kati garrison and announced them their intentions. The telephone network was cut off at 2 am and cadres of the US-RDA were arrested before dawn. The soldiers stopped President Keïta's convoy as he was going back to Bamako from Mopti. They wanted him to be arrested at Koulikoro when landing from his riverboat, the Général Abdoulaye Soumaré, but Keïta was ahead of schedule and his Citroën DS was blocked at 10 am at Kayo, a few kilometers from Bamako. Lieutenant Bagayoko asked "Monsieur le président, voulez-vous vous mettre à la disposition de l’armée ? [Mr. President, would you like to make yourself available to the army?]" and the officers forced him into a BTR-152 armored personnel carrier. He was brought to the center of the capital by 11:30. They demand him to stop his socialist policy and to replace his collaborators but Modibo Keïta refused, arguing he was democratically elected as a socialist. However, according to Captain Abdoulaye Ouologuem, driver of the presidential car, the mutineers only demanded new elections but the president refused. The military faction then broadcast a radio message announcing "the dictatorial regime [...] has fallen".

== Consequences ==
Due to the poor economic record of President Keïta, the coup was well received by the population. However, the immediate causes for the coup were overwhelming financial and economic problems, made worse by an especially poor harvest in 1968. Modibo Keïta, First Lady Mariam Travélé, and other members of the previous regime were imprisoned in Kidal and Taoudenni. Modibo Keïta died in captivity in Bamako in 1977. Ten lieutenants (Moussa Traoré, Baba Diarra, Youssouf Traoré, Filifing Sissoko, Tiécoro Bagayoko, Joseph Marat, Mamadou Sanogho, Cissema Toukara, Moussa Kone and Karim Dembele) and four captains (Yoro Diakité, Malik Diallo, Charles Cissoko and Mamadou Cissoko) formed the Military Committee for National Liberation. Moussa Traoré became its Chairman and promised democracy and free elections, that never came. He was proclaimed President in 1969 and ruled the country until he was deposed in the 1991 coup d'état.

== See also ==
- 1991 Malian coup d'état
- 2012 Malian coup d'état
- 2020 Malian coup d'état
