= Moussa Traoré =

President of Mali from 1968 to 1991

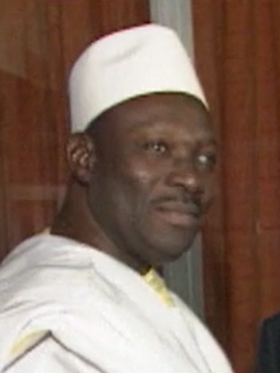
- Traoré in 1989

2nd President of Mali
- In office 19 November 1968 – 26 March 1991
- Deputy: Yoro Diakité; Amadou Baba Diarra
- Preceded by: Modibo Keïta
- Succeeded by: Amadou Toumani Touré

Personal details
- Born: 25 September 1936 Kayes, French Sudan (now Mali)
- Died: 15 September 2020 (aged 83) Bamako, Mali
- Party: Military (later UDPM)
- Spouse: Mariam Sissoko

Military service
- Allegiance: Mali
- Branch/service: Malian Army
- Years of service: 1960–1991
- Rank: Major General
- Battles/wars: Agacher Strip War; Tuareg rebellion (1990–1995)

Criminal details
- Conviction: Death of an estimated 300 protesters
- Target: protesters to his regime
- Victims: 200+
- Period: 1991
- Penalty: Capital punishment 1993, 1999
- Imprisoned: Markala Prison

Moussa Traoré (25 September 1936 – 15 September 2020) was a Malian military officer, politician, and dictator who served as the second President of Mali from 1968 to 1991. As a lieutenant, he led the military ousting of President Modibo Keïta in 1968. Thereafter he served as head of state until March 1991, when he was overthrown by popular protests and a military coup.

During his tenure, political activity was banned, marking a shift to authoritarian control. His right-hand man Tiécoro Bagayoko oversaw a regime of surveillance with the help of informants. He dismantled the socialist economic policies of his predecessor, Modibo Keïta. He was twice condemned to death in the 1990s, but eventually pardoned on both occasions and freed in 2002. He retired from public life and died in 2020.

== Early life ==
Born in Kayes Region, Traoré studied at Kita and at the military academy in Fréjus, France. He returned to Mali in 1960, after its 1959 independence. He became second lieutenant in 1961, and lieutenant in 1963. He went to Tanganyika (which later together with Zanzibar formed the new state of Tanzania) as military instructor to its liberation movements. He then became instructor at the École militaire interarmes in Kati.

== Head of state, 1968–1991 ==
On 19 November 1968 he took part in the coup d'état which deposed President Modibo Keïta. He became president of the Comité militaire de libération nationale, which made him effective Head of state of Mali. All political activity was banned. A police state was run by Captain Tiécoro Bagayoko. Informers monitored academics and teachers, mostly hostile to the military rule. The socialist economic policies of Modibo Keïta were partially dropped. In 1972–1973, a major drought hit Mali.

In 1974, Traoré issued a changed constitution for a Malian Second Republic, which was inaugurated in 1978. The new constitution was purported to move Mali toward civilian rule, the military junta stayed in power. In September 1976, they established the Democratic Union of the Malian People (UDPM), a new ruling political party organised according to a "non-ideological democratic centralism" which they borrowed from Modibo Keïta's conception of democratic centralism. In June 1979, a single-party general election was held. As general secretary of the UPDM, Traoré was automatically elected to a six-year term as president, and he was confirmed in office with 99 percent of the vote.

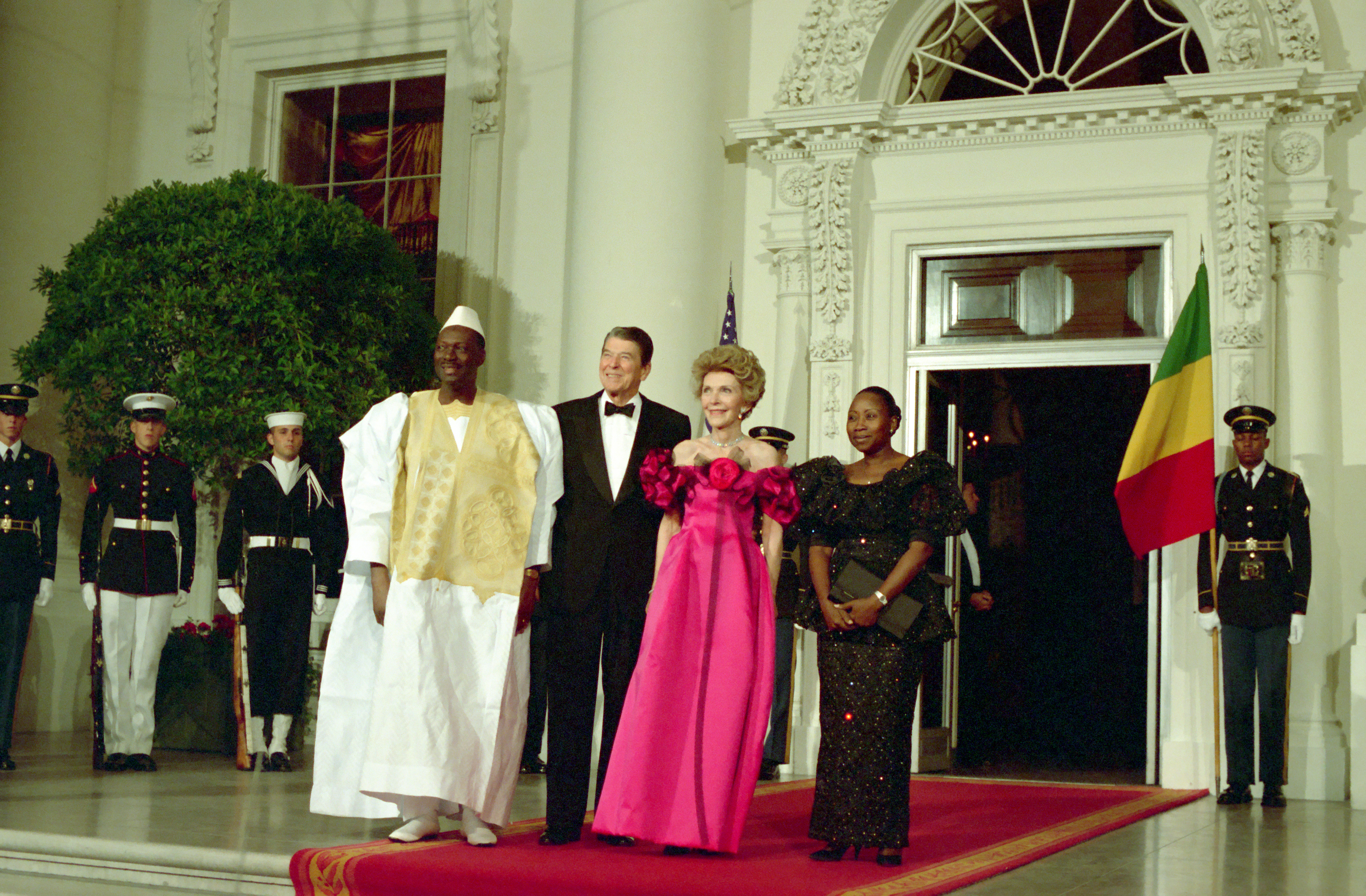
Ronald Reagan and Moussa Traoré in 1988

The political situation stabilized during 1981 and 1982, and remained generally calm throughout the 1980s. The UDPM began attracting additional members as it demonstrated that it could counter an effective voice against the excesses of local administrative authorities. Shifting its attention to Mali's economic difficulties, the government approved plans for cereal marketing liberalization, reform in the state enterprise system, new incentives to private enterprise, and an agreement with the International Monetary Fund (IMF). However, by 1990, there was growing dissatisfaction with the demands for austerity imposed by the IMF's economic reform programs and the perception that the president and his close associates were not themselves adhering to those demands. As in other African countries, demands for multi-party democracy increased. Traoré allowed some reforms, including the establishment of an independent press and independent political associations, but insisted that Mali was not ready for democracy.

=== Agacher Strip War ===
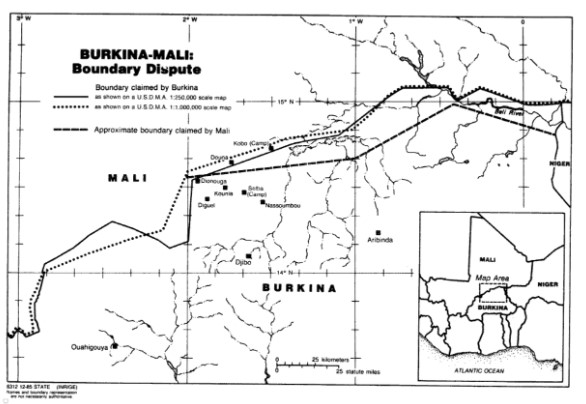
Agacher Strip

On 25 December 1985 tensions rose between Mali led by Traoré and Burkina Faso led by Thomas Sankara. Traoré's regime struggled to manage social unrest. When officials in Burkina Faso conducted a census in disputed border communities, Malian forces launched an offensive on Christmas Day. Since Mali had more power than Burkina Faso they used guerrilla warfare as the war continued raids were conducted in both countries. Then in early 1986 a peace agreement was made and resulted in Thomas Sankara and Traoré to avoid each other. This would affect Mali negatively but it boosted his popularity.

== Opposition and overthrow ==
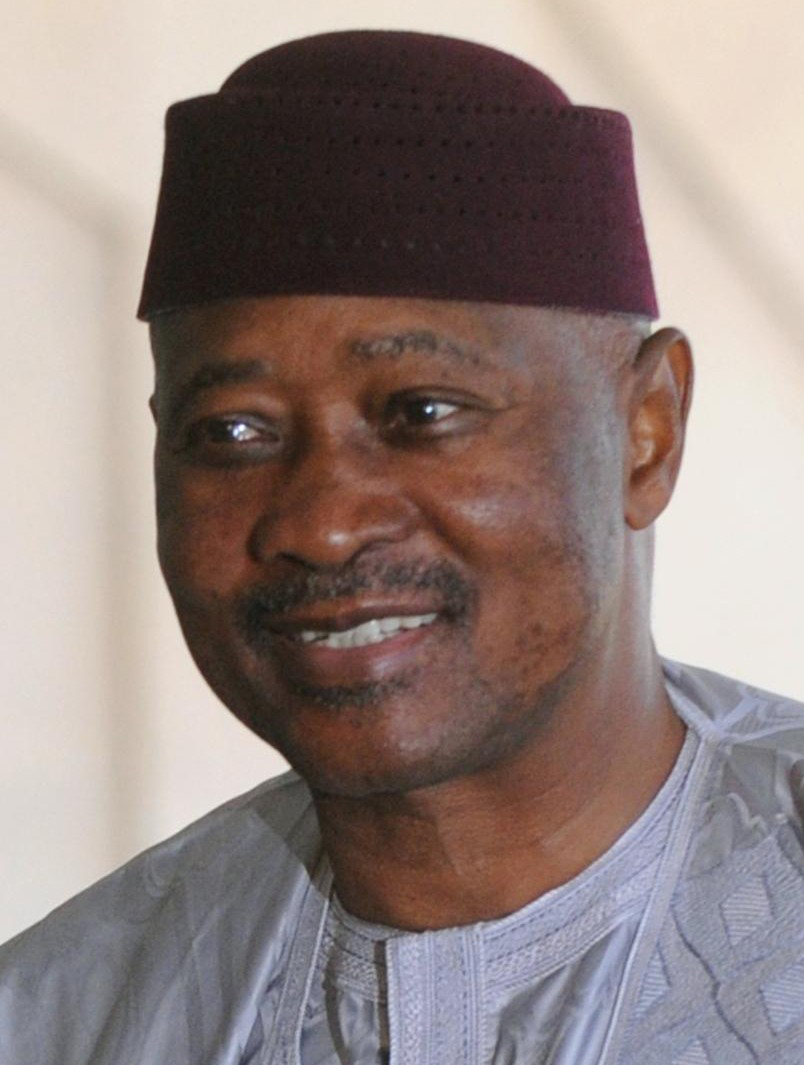
Amadou Toumani Touré, leader of the 1991 coup

In 1990, the National Congress for Democratic Initiative (Congrès National d’Initiative démocratique, CNID) was set up by the lawyer Mountaga Tall, and the Alliance for Democracy in Mali (Alliance pour la démocratie au Mali, ADEMA) by Abdourrahmane Baba and historian Alpha Oumar Konaré. These with the Association des élèves et étudiants du Mali (AEEM) and the Association Malienne des Droits de l'Homme (AMDH) aimed to contest Moussa Traoré's rule, with a plural political life.

On 22 March 1991 a huge protest march in central Bamako was put down violently, with estimates of those killed reaching 150. Four days later, the commander of Traoré's presidential guard, Col. Amadou Toumani Touré, removed Traoré from office and arrested him. A Transitional Committee for the Salvation of the People was set up under Touré's chairmanship, which oversaw a transition to democracy a year later.

== Trials and pardons ==
Imprisoned in Markala local Prison, in February 1993, Traoré was condemned to death for "political crimes", largely focused on the killing of around 300 pro-democracy demonstrators in Bamako, but his sentence was later commuted. In 1999 he was once more condemned to death with his wife Mariam Traoré, for "economic crimes": the embezzling of the equivalent of US$350,000 during his rule. President Alpha Oumar Konaré commuted these sentences to life imprisonment. Shortly before leaving office, on 29 May 2002, he further pardoned the couple, for the sake of national reconciliation, a stance which incoming president Amadou Toumani Touré championed.

Traoré's once reviled legacy somewhat softened under Touré, with the former dictator recognised at least informally as a former head of state and many former supporters now rallying around Chogel Maiga's Patriotic Movement for Renewal party (Mouvement Patriotique pour le Renouveau, MPR). Both Traoré and his wife retired from public life, in part due to ill health.

== Death ==
Traoré died on 15 September 2020 in Bamako, just ten days before his 84th birthday. He was given a state funeral, which was attended by members of the ruling National Committee for the Salvation of the People.

Political offices
Preceded by Modibo Keïta	President of Mali; 1968–1991	Succeeded by Amadou Toumani Touré
