= Yoro Diakité =

Malian politician and military figure (1932–1973)

Yoro Diakité (17 October 1932 – 13 June 1973) was a Malian politician and military figure. Diakite was the Prime Minister of Mali and Head of the Provisional Government from 19 November 1968 to 18 September 1969, and then Vice President of the ruling junta. After being accused of organizing a coup attempt in 1971, he was condemned to life imprisonment and died in the Taoudenni prison camp in June 1973.
