= List of Malians =

== Academics and Writers ==
=== Academics ===
- Sidibé Aminata Diallo

=== Scholars of Sankore Madrasah ===
Scholars wrote their own books as part of a socioeconomic model. Students were charged with copying these books and any other books they could get their hands on. Today there are over 700,000 manuscripts in Timbuktu with many dating back to West Africa's Golden Age (12th-16th centuries).

- Ahmad Baba al Massufi (1556–1627)
- Mohammed Bagayogo
- Al-Qadi Aqib ibn Mahmud ibn Umar

=== Writers ===
- Ahmad Baba al Massufi (1556–1627)
- Abdoulaye Ascofaré (born 1949)
- Ibrahima Aya (born 1967)
- Amadou Hampâté Bâ (1900–1991)
- Adame Ba Konaré (born 1947)
- Massa Makan Diabaté (1938–1988)
- Souéloum Diagho
- Aïda Mady Diallo
- Alpha Mandé Diarra (born 1954)
- Doumbi Fakoly (born 1944)
- Aoua Kéita (1912–1980)
- Moussa Konaté
- Yambo Ouologuem (born 1940)
- Oumou Armand Diarra (born 1967)
- Bernadette Sanou Dao (born 1952)
- Aminata Traoré (born 1942)
- Falaba Issa Traoré (1930–2003)

== Entertainers and artists ==
=== Film directors ===
- Abdoulaye Ascofaré
- Souleymane Cissé
- Adama Drabo
- Assane Kouyaté
- Cheick Oumar Sissoko
- Falaba Issa Traoré
- Sidy Fassara Diabaté

=== Griots ===
- Abdoulaye Diabaté
- Baba Sissoko
- Bakari Sumano (1935–2003)
- Balla Tounkara
- Djelimady Tounkara

=== Musicians ===
- Khaira Arby
- Issa Bagayogo
- Afel Bocoum
- Fanta Damba
- Toumani Diabaté
- Yaya Diallo
- Tiken Jah Fakoly
- Mory Kanté
- Salif Keita
- Mamani Keïta
- Habib Koité
- Drissa Kone
- Kandia Kouyaté
- Maimuna
- Moussa Kouyate
- Amadou et Mariam
- Fanta Sacko
- Oumou Sangaré
- Ko Kan Ko Sata
- Djeneba Seck
- Baba Sissoko
- Jali Nyama Suso
- Tinariwen
- Djelimady Tounkara
- Ali Farka Touré
- Vieux Farka Touré
- Boubacar Traoré
- Lobi Traoré
- Rokia Traoré
- Aya Nakamura
- Soriba Kouyate

=== Photographers ===
- Alioune Bâ
- Seydou Keïta
- Malick Sidibé

=== Puppeteers ===
- Yaya Coulibaly

=== Artists ===
- Abdoulaye Konaté

== Military figures ==
- Nema Sagara

== Religious figures ==
- Julien Mory Sidibé - Catholic bishop
- Sidi Yahya - Mosque/Madrassah named for him

== Rulers (pre-modern) ==
=== Partial list of mansas of the Mali Empire ===
- Sundiata Keita (1240–1255)
- Wali Keita (1255–1270)
- Ouati Keita (1270–1274)
- Khalifa Keita (1274–1275)
- Abu Bakr (1275–1285)
- Sakura (1285–1300)
- Gao (1300–1305)
- Mohammed ibn Gao (1305–1310)
- Abubakari II (1310–1312)
- Kankan Musa I (1312–1337)
- Maghan (1337–1341)
- Suleyman (1341–1360)
- Kassa (1360)
- Mari Diata II (1360–1374)
- Musa II (1374–1387)
- Magha II (1387–1389)
- Sandaki (1389–1390)
- Mahmud (1390–1400)

Note: As the Mali Empire and the modern nation of Mali substantially overlap most of these names likely do apply, but some may not.

=== Bambara Empire ===
- Bitòn Coulibaly
- Ngolo Diarra (1766–1795)
- Mansong Diarra (1795–1808)

=== Massina Empire ===
- Seku Amadu (1820–1845)
- Amadu II of Masina (1845–1852)
- Amadu III of Masina (1852–1862)

=== Various kingdoms ===
- Sulayman Bal (died 1775)
- Babemba Traoré-Kénédougou

== Modern politicians ==
- Ahmed Mohamed ag Hamani
- Soumaïla Cissé
- Moussa Sinko Coulibaly
- Mamadou Dembelé - former Prime Minister
- Yoro Diakité - former Prime Minister
- Sidibé Aminata Diallo
- Daba Diawara
- Moustapha Dicko
- Tiébilé Dramé
- Fatou Haidara
- Ibrahim Boubacar Keïta
- Modibo Keïta
- Alpha Oumar Konaré
- Garan Fabou Kouyate
- Aoua Kéita
- Choguel Kokalla Maïga - Patriotic Movement for Renewal
- Ousmane Issoufi Maïga
- Moctar Ouane
- Ahmed Diane Semega
- Mandé Sidibé
- Sidibe Korian Sidibe
- Cheick Oumar Sissoko
- Soumana Sacko - former Prime Minister
- Abdoulaye Sékou Sow - former Prime Minister
- Hamed Diane Séméga - politician and businessman
- Ousmane Sy
- Mountaga Tall
- Ascofare Oulematou Tamboura
- Amadou Toumani Touré
- Younoussi Touré - former Prime Minister
- Dioncounda Traoré - Party President of the Alliance for Democracy in Mali
- Moussa Traoré
- Aminata Traoré
- Yeah Samake

== Scientists ==
- Cheick Modibo Diarra - astrophysicist
- Nassif Ghoussoub - mathematician

== Sportspeople ==
=== Basketball players ===
- Ousmane Cisse
- Soumaila Samake
- Adama Sanogo

=== Footballers ===
- Sedonoude Abouta
- Mamadou Bagayoko
- Adama Coulibaly
- Moussa Coulibaly (born 1981) - footballer
- Soumaila Coulibaly
- Cheick Oumar Dabo
- Mamadou Diallo - footballer
- Souleymane Diamoutene
- Mahamadou Diarra
- Fousseni Diawara
- Mintou Doucoure
- Frédéric Kanouté
- Jimmy Kebe
- Salif Keita - footballer
- Seydou Keita - footballer
- Djibril Konaté
- Amadou Konte
- Tenema N'Diaye
- Mamady Sidibe
- Rafan Sidibé
- Mohamed Sissoko
- Adama Tamboura
- Fousseni Tangara
- Jean Tigana
- Alhassane Touré
- Alioune Touré
- Abdou Traoré
- Alou Traoré
- Djimi Traoré
- Dramane Traoré

=== Olympic athletes ===
- Cheick Bathily
- Mamadi Berthe
- Drissa Diakite
- Soumaila Diakite
- Boucader Diallo
- Boubacar Koné

== Other ==
- Sira Diop (1929–2013), educator, feminist, trade unionist
- Halima Cissé (born 1996), mother who gave birth to the only nonuplets known to have survived birth
