= Illegal immigration to Libya =

Immigration in libya

Illegal immigration in Libya refers to the practice of immigrating to or living in Libya in an unlawful manner. Since the 1990s, many Sub-Saharan migrants have traveled through Libya in order to board boats headed for continental Europe. In 1995, around 300,000 Sub-Saharan Africans lived in Libya. In 2004, around 4,000 Malians, Nigerians, and Sudanese were arrested for illegal immigration to Libya. The Libyan government has been criticised for breaching illegal immigrants rights during the deportation of people.

== History ==
After gaining independence in 1951, Libya was a mostly impoverished country. After the discovery of hydrocarbons, the petroleum industry came to dominate the national economy. Need for manpower brought migrants, mostly Egyptians, to Libya. However, in the 1990s, sub-saharan Africans began migrating to Libya in larger numbers. Sanctions and economic hardships decreased the attractiveness of Libya as a destination country, instead being used as a transit country to reach Europe. In February 2025, an international group of researchers accused the Tunisian authorities of being directly involved in the expulsion and sale to Libya of migrants from sub-Saharan Africa, in a report presented to the European Parliament.

Due to turbulent conditions, the government of Libya would often deport migrants from countries that had poor diplomatic relations with the Libyan government. Tunisians in particular were expelled 8 times between 1966 and 1985. Thousands of migrant workers from Tunisia and Libya regularly crossed the border to find work. The Tunisian population in Libya, and around 211,000.
