= Alioune Blondin Béye =

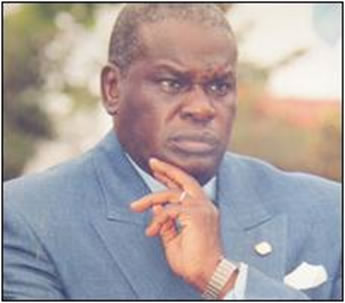

United Nations Special Representative to Angola
- In office June 1993 – June 26, 1998

Minister of Foreign Affairs
- In office May 4, 1978 – 1986
- President: Moussa Traoré
- Preceded by: Yusuf Traoré
- Succeeded by: Modibo Keita

Personal details
- Born: January 8, 1939 Bafoulabe, Kayes Region, French Sudan (now Mali)
- Died: June 26, 1998 (aged 59) Côte d'Ivoire
- Children: 4

Alioune Blondin Béye, also known as Maitre Béye, was a Malian professor and politician who served as the Malian Minister of Foreign Affairs under Moussa Traoré between 1978 and 1986. Due to his efforts in ending the Angolan Civil War, the Alioune Blondin Beye Peacekeeping School in Bamako is named after him.

== Biography ==
Béye was born on January 8, 1939, in Bafoulabé, Kayes Region, French Sudan. His first government position was as the Malian Minister of Youth, Sports, Arts, and Culture from 1977 to January 7, 1978. Beye was then appointed the Minister of Foreign Affairs, where he served from 1978 to 1986. He then served as a legal counsel to the Malian president from 1986 to 1989. Between 1989 and 1993, Beye was Secretary General and then director of the legal department at the African Development Bank in Côte d'Ivoire and a member of the African Commission for Human Rights.

In 1993, Boutros Boutros-Ghali appointed Beye as the UN Special Representative for Angola to help resolve the Angolan Civil War that had been raging since 1975. Beye's mediation led to a 1994 peace agreement where UNITA gave up lands it controlled to the Angolan government. Beye also served as the head of UNAVEM I and UNAVEM II from June 1993 to 1997, and then as head of the UN Observation Mission in the country from 1997 until 1998. In his free time, he lectured about international law at the University of Dijon in Dijon, France and the National School of Administration in Bamako, Mali.

On June 26, 1998, during a flight from Togo to Abidjan, his plane crashed in Cote d'Ivoire along with five other UN workers and three crewmen. There were no survivors. Beye left behind a wife and four children. In tribute to Beye, the peacekeeping school in Bamako was renamed to the Alioune Blondin Beye Peacekeeping School and the French high school in Luanda was renamed to the Alioune Blondin Beye High School.
