= Kassi (wife of Suleyman of Mali) =

Kassi (fl. 1352) (also called Qasa) was an empress of the Kingdom of Mali and one of the wives of Mansa Suleyman (r. 1341–1360). She was called Qasa, which means 'the Queen'.

Principal wife and paternal cousin of Suleyman, Kassi ruled jointly with her husband, as was traditional. Ibn Battuta wrote, "the queen is his partner in the kingship, following the custom of the blacks. Her name is mentioned in the pulpit". Having one's name read in the pulpit during Muslim services in the mosque is an honor due only to an actual sovereign, not a mere consort. Qasa was one of twenty female Muslim rulers who met the Muslim criteria of sovereignty.

She was extremely popular with the royal court, which counted many of her relations among its members. But she soon fell out of favor with her husband, who preferred a commoner named Bendjou. Eventually, he divorced her to marry the latter. The noble ladies of the court took Kassi's side, continuing to recognize her legitimacy and refusing to honor the new royal wife. Such insubordination – they threw earth on their heads to honor Kassi while throwing earth on their hands to insult Bendjou – soon angered Suleyman and his new wife, to the point that Kassi was forced to seek sanctuary in the mosque.

Civil war soon erupted, as she encouraged the nobility, including her relations, to revolt. The war was a struggle between two ideological factions; one group supported Suleyman, while the other supported not only Kassi but sons of the former ruler, Maghan. Suleyman and his chiefs eventually defeated Kassi and her cousins, discrediting her by showing that she and her cousin, Djathal, who had been banished for treason, were in league together.

The coup d'état happened in 1352 or 1353. Kassi was the mother of Kassa, who succeeded Suleyman briefly before being replaced by his cousin Mari Diata II.
