= Nema Sagara =

Malian Army officer

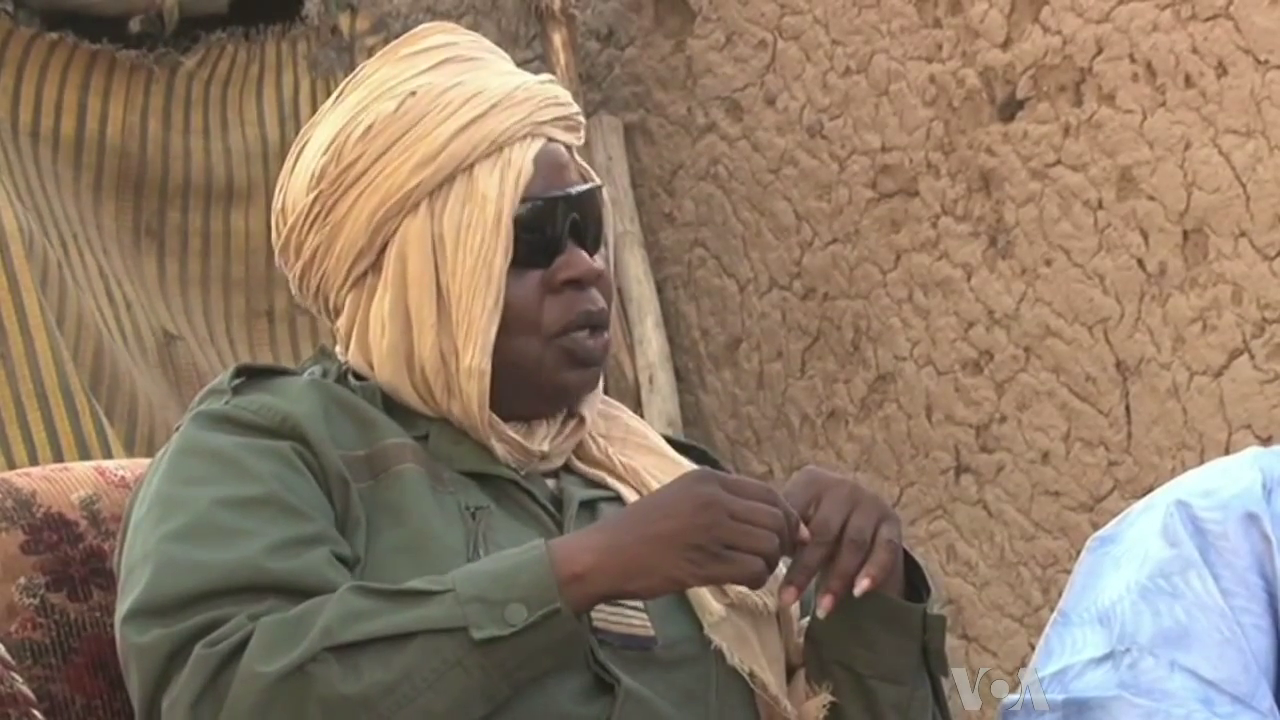
- Nema Sagara in Gao in 2013
- Born: Bamako
- Military career
- Rank: General
- Conflicts: Northern Mali 2013

Nema Sagara is a general in the Malian Air Force. She received military education since 1986 in Mali, France and the United States. She is one of Africa's most senior female soldiers and one of the few Malian female commissioned officer to have seen combat.

== Service ==
From 1997 to 2012, she worked in various services, notably at the Bamako airbase 100, Bamako-Sénou airbase 101 and at the general staff headquarters of the Malian armies. She also served in the United Nations Mission in Liberia (2004-2005) and she was a teacher at the École de maintien de la paix Alioune Blondin Beye (2007-2009) and at the basic training center in Koutiala (2012-2013). During the Northern Mali conflict in 2013, she was number two of the Malian army in the Gao region, recently taken back from the Islamists coalition. She is the head of "militaro-civilian" action in the area.

In 2015, she was appointed deputy commander of the Bamako airbase 100 and became commander of this base in 2016. Her discharge from this post in November 2016 provoked reactions in the Malian press. Since 2017, she is responsible of the Permanent Secretariat to combat the Proliferation of Small Arms and Light Weapons (in French: Secrétariat Permanent de lutte contre la Prolifération des Armes Légères et de Petit Calibre).

In 2025, she was arrested along with several suspects on charges of plotting a coup against the ruling military junta with the help of French intelligence services.
