= Malians =

People identified with the country of Mali

- Flag of Mali, the uniting primary symbol of Malian nationhood

Total population
- Mali: 25,932,275 (2026)
- Ivory Coast: 1,104,849 (2021 census)
- Mauritania: 304,000 (2025 UNHCR)
- France: 150,000 (2023 HCDAF)
- Saudi Arabia: 38,360 (2022 census)
- United States: 6,000

Languages
- French (official), Bambara, Fulfulde (Peuhl), Songhai and Tamasheq

Religion
- Predominantly; Islam (96.4%); Minority; Christianity (2.3%); Traditional faiths (0.7%)

Malians are the citizens and nationals of Mali. As Mali is located at the cultural crossroads of North Africa and West Africa, Malians include a range of West African ethnicities such as the Bambara, Fula, Senufo, Malinke, Songhai and Bobo peoples but also a range of groups with origins in the Middle East and North Africa such as Hassaniya Arabs and Malian Jews, primarily around the city of Timbuktu.

== Ethnic groups ==
The largest ethnic group in Mali is the Bambara.

== Religion ==
The majority of Malians are Muslims.

== See also ==
- List of Malians
