= Sidibe Korian Sidibe =

Malian politician

Madame Sidibé Korian Sidibé is a Deputy in the National Assembly of Mali and a member of the Pan-African Parliament. The other Malian members of the Pan-African Parliament are Ibrahim Boubacar Keïta, Mountaga Tall, and Ascofare Oulematou Tamboura.
