= Mari Djata II of Mali =

Jata

Mansa of Mali
- Reign: c. 1360 – c. 1374
- Predecessor: Qanba
- Successor: Musa II
- Died: c. 1374; Mali Empire
- Issue: Musa II; Maghan II
- Dynasty: Keita
- Father: Maghan I
- Religion: Islam

Mansa Jata, commonly referred to as Mari Jata II, possibly incorrectly, (Note: Ibn Khaldun refers to him as Jata several times and uses the name Mari Jata for him once. It is possible that the single use of the name Mari Jata was in error. The error could be due to confusion of the words mari and mansa and/or confusion with either of the other figures named Mari Jata. Mari is a title that Ibn Khaldun translates in two different ways, as either "ruler of the blood royal" or "vizier". The first Mari Jata was Sunjata.) known in oral histories as Konkodugu Kamissa was mansa of Mali from 1360 to 1374. He was an ineffective ruler, and his reign, recorded by the contemporary North African historian Ibn Khaldun, marked the beginning of the decline of the Mali Empire.

Jata was the son of Mansa Maghan, and as such the grandson of Mansa Musa. Jata may be the same person as a figure named Jatil (Note: Spelled either Jāṭil or Jāṭ in different manuscripts.) mentioned by Ibn Battuta. (Note: The identity of Jata and Jatil is supported by similarity of names and their both being male-line relatives of Suleyman who sought to take power by force. Jata was Suleyman's great-nephew, but Ibn Battuta referred to Jatil as Suleyman's paternal cousin (ibn ʾamm). However, Ibn Battuta may have meant that Jatil was a male-line relative of Suleyman, rather than specifically the son of Suleyman's father's brother, so this does not necessarily disprove the two being the same. Complicating matters is the fact that Jata was a common name in the royal family of Mali, also being borne by both Sunjata and the vizier Mari Jata.) If so, he was living in exile in Kanburni during the reign of his great-uncle Mansa Suleyman, possibly because Suleyman had seized the throne from Jata's father Maghan by force. Jata then would have conspired with Suleyman's wife Qasa, who may have been his sister, to depose Suleyman. However, Qasa was found out and the coup attempt was prevented.

When Suleyman died, he was succeeded by his son Qanba, who would reign for only nine months. Civil war soon broke out, of which Jata was the victor. He had consolidated power by late 1360. A delegation bearing gifts for the Marinid sultan had been prepared by Suleyman, but he had died before the delegation could be sent, and the delegation spent the civil war in Walata. Jata added gifts to the delegation, including a giraffe, and sent the delegation to Fez. The delegation arrived in December 1360 or January 1361, (Note: The delegation arrived in Safar 762 AH, which lasted from approximately 11 December 1360 to 8 January 1361 in the Julian calendar.) where it was received by Sultan Abu Salim and attracted much interest among the people of Fez.

Jata was regarded as a tyrannical and wasteful ruler. He was said to have sold one of the national treasures of Mali, a boulder of gold that weighed twenty qintars, for far less than it was worth.

Jata contracted a sleeping sickness (Note: Presumably African trypanosomiasis, of which Jata would be the earliest recorded specific case, though the disease was already well-known in Africa.) which increasingly incapacitated him. After two years of illness and a fourteen-year reign he died, in 1373 or 1374. (Note: Mansa Jata died in 775 AH, which lasted from approximately 23 June 1373 to 11 June 1374 in the Julian calendar.) He was succeeded by his son Musa; another son of his, Magha, would succeed Musa.

D. T. Niane identified Jata with Konkodugu Kamissa, a figure in oral tradition of Hamana, but Yves Person disputed Niane's interpretations of traditional genealogies and suggested that there is a gap in oral tradition between the middle of the 14th century and beginning of the 17th, with Sulayman being the last mansa remembered before this gap.

== Footnotes ==
Preceded by Qasa	Mansa of the Mali Empire; 1360–1374	Succeeded by Musa II
