= Jacopo Russo =

Sicilian Renaissance mapmaker

Jacopo Russo was a Sicilian Renaissance mapmaker. His portolan maps were highly illustrated, often depicting local cities and rulers.

He authored a 1520 portolan, made in Messina, incorporating such illustrated map. He also created a Mansa Musa Map circa 1525, a Nautical chart of the Mediterranean now in The British Library (Add. MS 31318B). This map was created for Mansa Musa, the ruler of Mali, then one of the most powerful Muslim kingdoms of Saharan Africa. This map is well in the tradition of Italian portolan map, but is remarkable for the considerable weight it gives to northern Africa.

Two of his maps dated 1564 and 1588 from the Biblioteca Trivulziana in Milan were lost in the bombing raids of the Second World War.

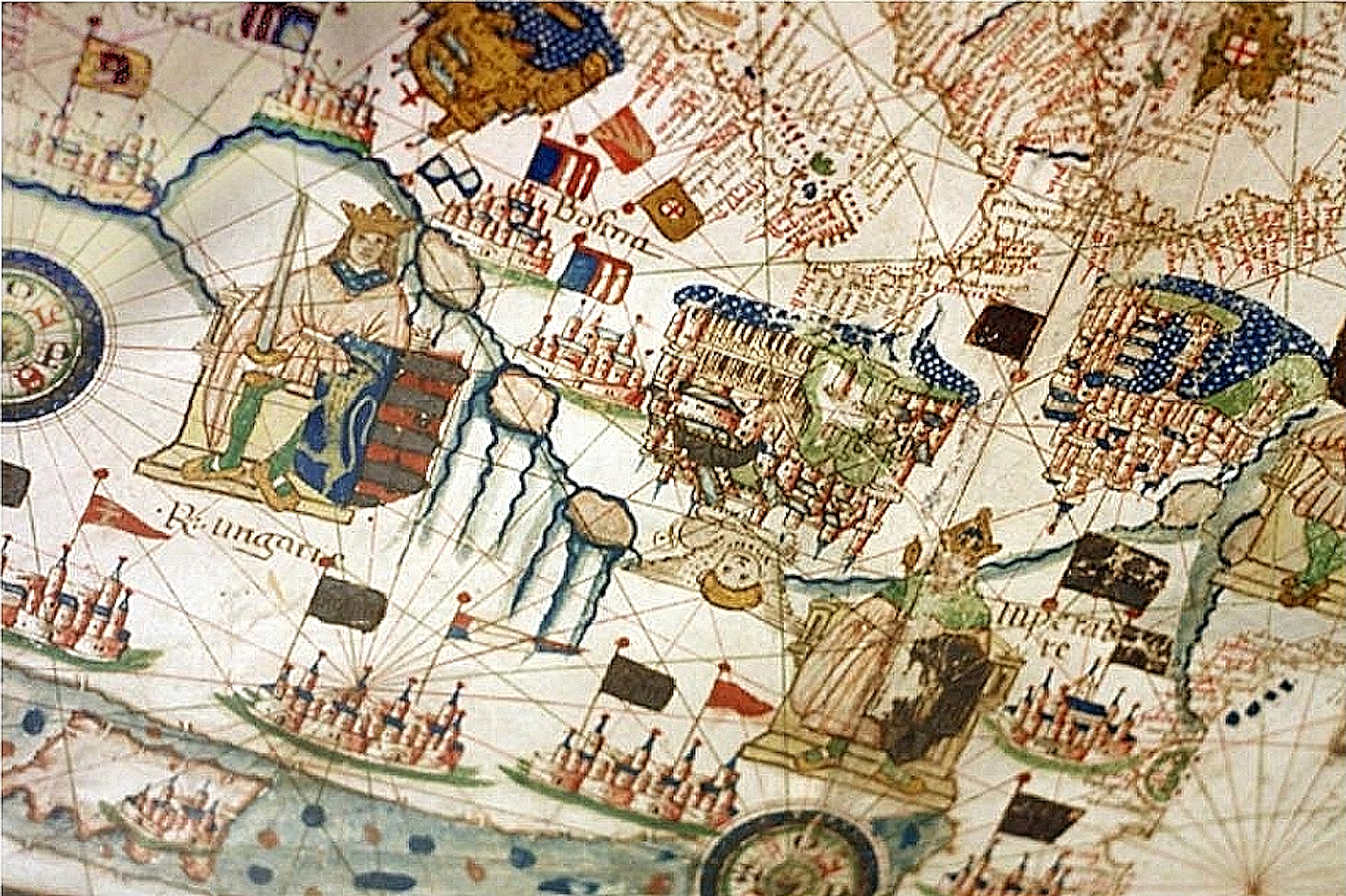
Detail of Hungary and the Balkans, ca. 1528, by Jacopo Russo of Messina, Sicily.

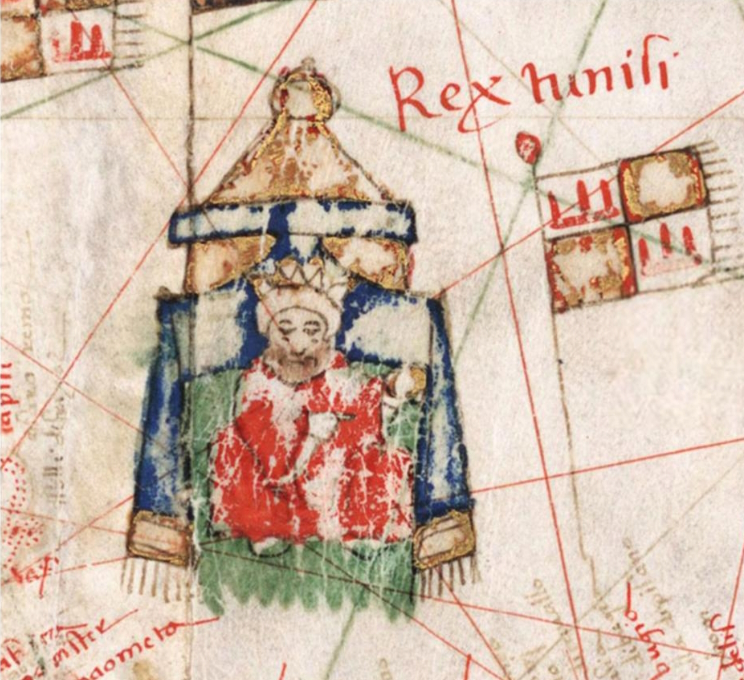
"Rex Tunisi" (detail) Jacopo Russo, Portolan, 1520, parchment, 105.5 × 67 cm. Archivio di Stato di Firenze, Nautiche Map 12.

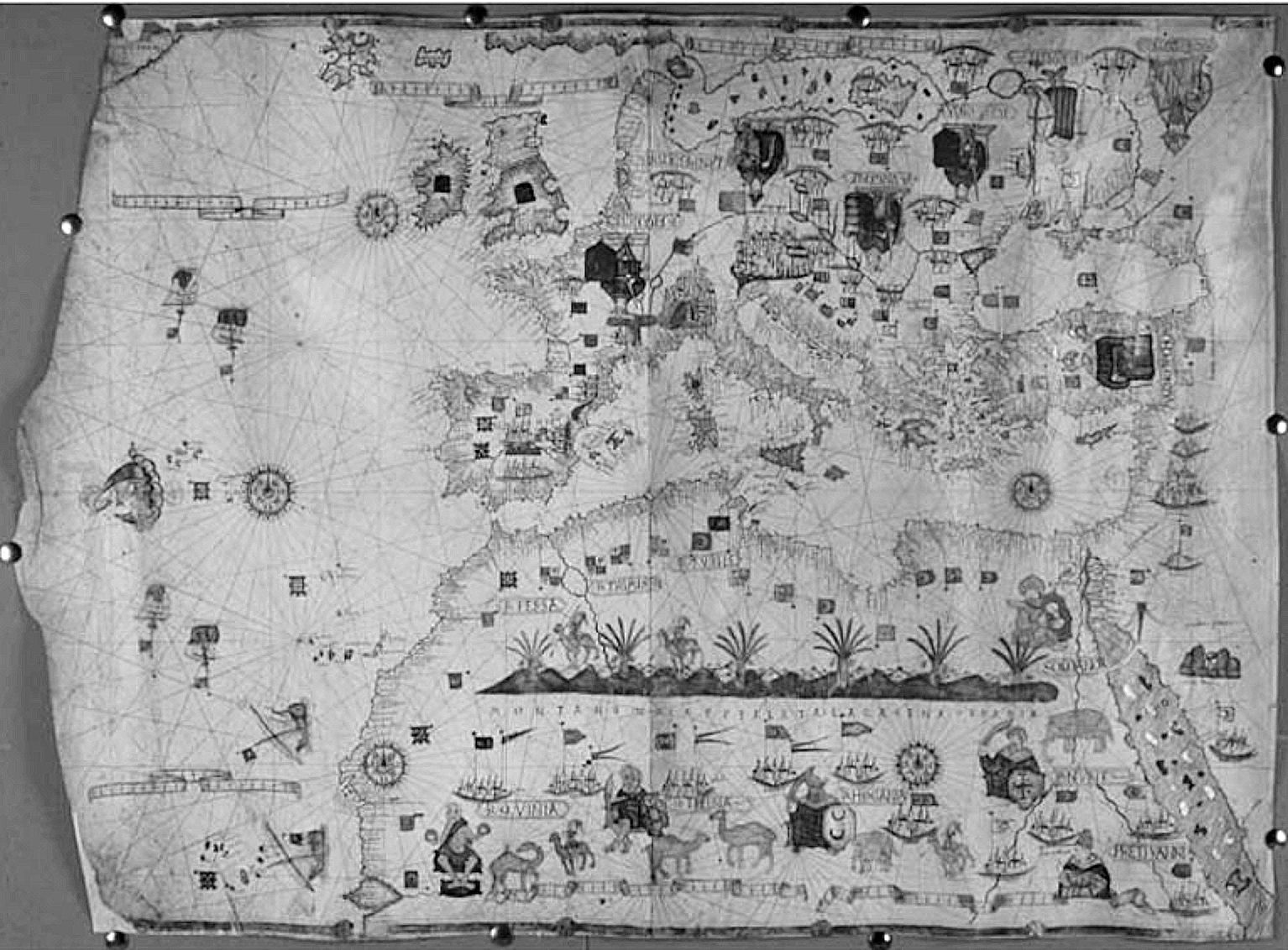
The Mansa Musa Map, c. 1525, Nautical chart of the Mediterranean by The British Library Board, Add. MS 31318B, vellum.

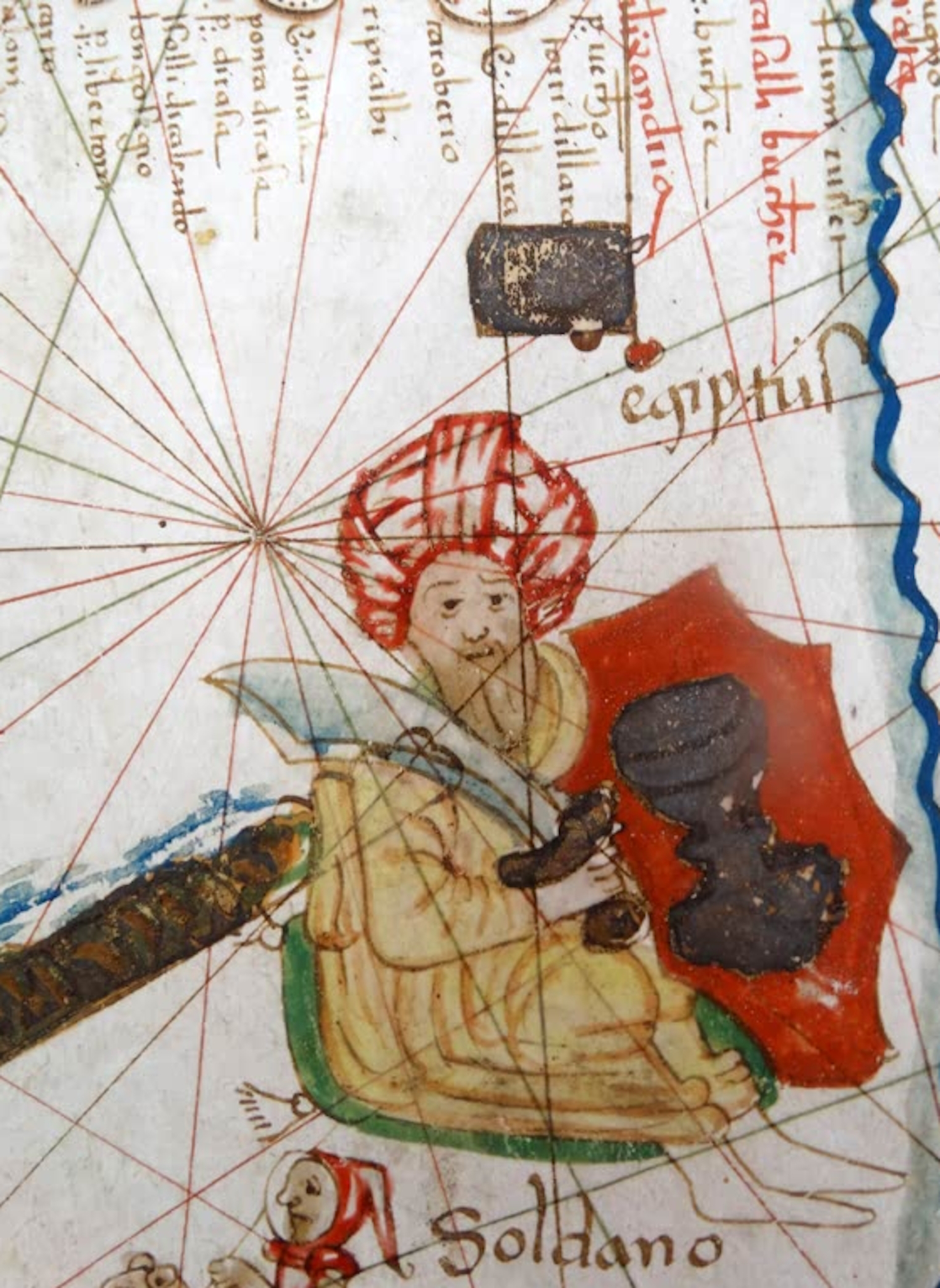
"Sultan of Egypt", possibly Hadim Suleiman Pasha, Mansa Musa Map, c. 1525

== Sources ==
- Astengo, Conradino (2007). "Cartography in the European Renaissance". History of Cartography Volume 3 (PDF). Chicago: University of Chicago Press. pp. 174–262. ISBN 978-0226907345.
- Baskins, Cristelle L. (24 November 2022). Hafsids and Habsburgs in the Early Modern Mediterranean: Facing Tunis. Springer Nature. ISBN 978-3-031-05079-4.
- Byrne, Joseph P. (22 June 2017). The World of Renaissance Italy: A Daily Life Encyclopedia [2 volumes]. Bloomsbury Publishing USA. ISBN 979-8-216-16850-8.
- Kläger, Florian; Bayer, Gerd (12 February 2016). Early Modern Constructions of Europe: Literature, Culture, History. Routledge. ISBN 978-1-317-39492-1.
