= National Order of Mali =

Honorary distinction of Mali

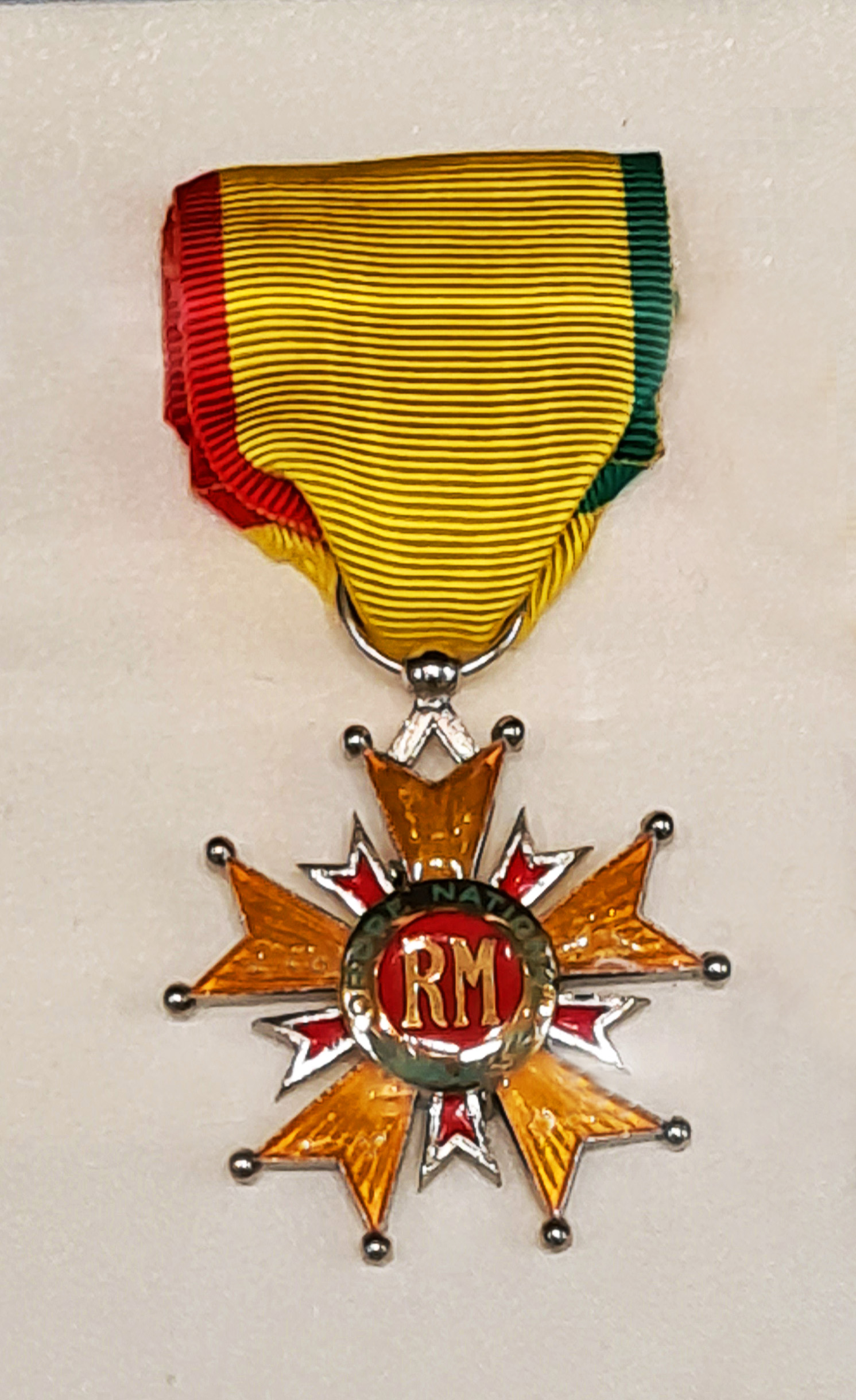

Awarded by President of Mali
- Established: 31 May 1963
- Status: Currently constituted
- Grades: Grand Cross; Grand Officer; Commander; Officer; Knight
- Ribbon of the order

The National Order of Mali (French: Ordre National du Mali) is the highest of honorific orders of Mali.

== History ==
The National Order of Mali was founded on 31 May 1963 to celebrate the independence of the country acquired in 1960 after decades of French colonisation. As such, the order was granted to deserving personalities to the state and could also be granted to foreign heads of state as a sign of friendship.

== Classes ==
The Order consists of the following classes of merit:

Ribbon bars
Grand Cross	Grand Officer	Commander	Officer	Knight

== Recipients ==
- Sira Diop, Malian educator and trades unionist, Grand officier, 2005
- Recep Tayyip Erdoğan, President of Turkey
- Kim Il Sung, President of North Korea
- Kim Song-ae, wife of Kim Il Sung
- Kim Jong Il, heir apparent of Kim Il Sung
- Ibrahim Traoré, President of Burkina Faso, 2025

== Insignia ==
The medal of the Order is composed on the model of French Legion of Honor with a ten-pointed yellow outer cross, each point ending in a gold pearl and a ten-pointed smaller inner red cross, edged in gold. At the center of the crosses is a medallion of red enamel with the letters "RM" ("République du Mali"), surrounded by a golden ring, bearing the phrase "ORDRE NATIONAL" ("National Order") in red letters above and two crossed laurel branches under.

The plaque has the same design as the medal, on an eight-pointed "silver rays" star.

The ribbon is yellow with a green border on one side and a red one on the other, which remember the colours of the national flag of Mali.
