= Mansa Musa =

Ruler of Mali from c. 1312 to c. 1337

Musa I
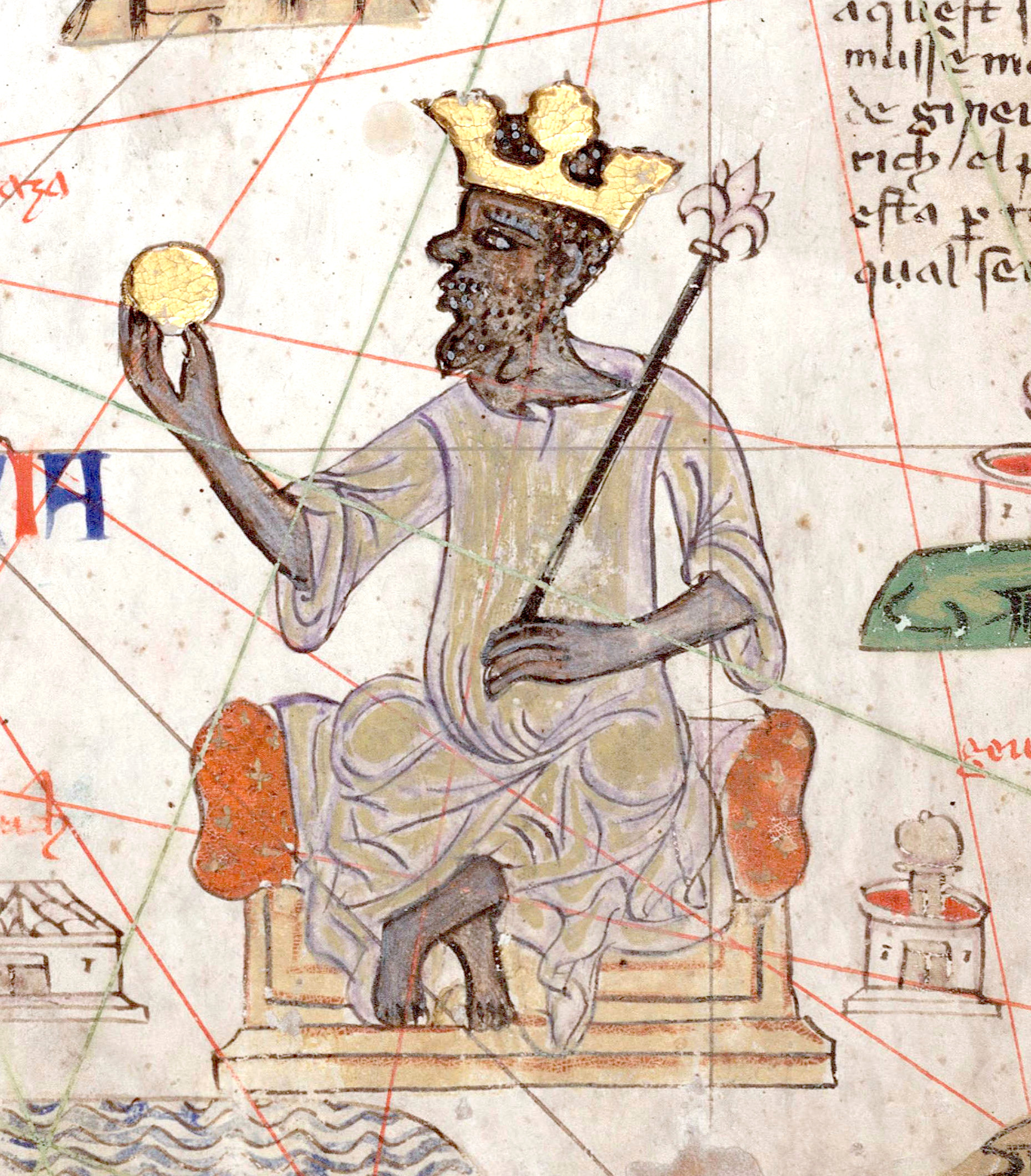
- Depiction of Mansa Musa, ruler of the Mali Empire in the 14th century, from the 1375 Catalan Atlas (Paris, BnF, Espagnol 30, sheet 6)

Mansa of Mali
- Reign: c. 1312 – c. 1337 (Note: The dates of Musa's reign are uncertain. Musa is reported to have reigned for 25 years, and different lines of evidence suggest he died either c. 1332 or c. 1337, with the 1337 date being considered more likely.) (approx. 25 years)
- Predecessor: Muhammad
- Successor: Magha
- Born: c. 1280; Mali Empire
- Died: c. 1337 (aged c. 57); Mali Empire
- Spouse: Inari Konte
- Issue: Maghan I
- House: Keita dynasty
- Religion: Sunni Islam (Maliki school)

Mansa Musa (Note: Arabic: منسا موسى, romanized: Mansā Mūsā) (c. 1280 – c. 1337) was the ninth Mansa of the Mali Empire, which reached its territorial peak during his reign. Musa's reign is often regarded as the zenith of Mali's power and prestige, although he features less in Mandinka oral traditions than his predecessors.

Musa was exceptionally wealthy, to an extent that contemporaries described him as inconceivably rich; Time magazine reported: "There's really no way to put an accurate number on his wealth." They cite Ferrum College history professor Richard Smith, who said Mali was likely the largest gold producer in the world at the time, but "contemporary sources describe the king's riches in terms that are impossible for the time."

It is known from local manuscripts and travellers' accounts that Mansa Musa's wealth came principally from the Mali Empire's control and taxing of the trade in salt from northern regions and especially from gold panned and mined in Bambuk and Bure to the south. Over a very long period Mali had amassed a large reserve of gold. Mali is also believed to have been involved in the trade in many goods such as ivory, slaves, spices, silks, and ceramics. However, presently little is known about the extent or mechanics of these trades. It is estimated that two thirds of the gold circulating in the Medieval Mediterranean came from West Africa and this accounts for almost half of the Old World's gold supply.

Archeological investigations near the town of Tadmekka shows Malians invented their own process of refining gold by using melted glass and removing impurities. While gold was abundant, copper was incredibly scarce and prized in Sub-Saharan Africa and "was exchanged for gold at rates that would be considered unfair by present-day standards." At the time of Musa's ascension to the throne, Mali consisted largely of the territory of the former Ghana Empire, which had become a vassal of Mali. The Mali Empire comprised land that is now part of Guinea, Senegal, Mauritania, the Gambia, and the modern state of Mali which would be an area of 1,300,000 km^{2}.

Musa went on Hajj to Mecca in 1324, traveling with an enormous entourage and a vast supply of gold. En route, he spent time in Cairo, where his lavish gift-giving is said to have noticeably affected the value of gold in Egypt and garnered the attention of the wider Muslim world. Musa expanded the borders of the Mali Empire, in particular incorporating the cities of Gao and Timbuktu into its territory. He sought closer ties with the rest of the Muslim world, particularly the Mamluk and Marinid Sultanates. He recruited scholars from the wider Muslim world to travel to Mali, such as the Andalusian poet Abu Ishaq al-Sahili, and helped establish Timbuktu as a center of Islamic learning. His reign is associated with numerous construction projects, including a portion of Djinguereber Mosque in Timbuktu.

== Name and titles ==
Mansa Musa's personal name was Musa (Arabic: موسى, romanized: Mūsá), the name of Moses in Islam. Mansa, 'ruler' or 'king' in Mandé, was the title of the ruler of the Mali Empire.

In oral tradition and the Timbuktu Chronicles, Musa is further known as Kanku Musa. (Note: The name is transcribed in the Tarikh al-Sudan as Kankan (Arabic: كنكن, romanized: Kankan), which Cissoko concluded was a representation of the Mandinka woman's name Kanku.) In Mandé tradition, it was common for one's name to be prefixed by his mother's name, so the name Kanku Musa means "Musa, son of Kanku", although it is unclear whether the genealogy implied is literal. Al-Yafii gave Musa's name as Musa ibn Abi Bakr ibn Abi al-Aswad (Arabic: موسى بن أبي بكر بن أبي الأسود, romanized: Mūsā ibn Abī Bakr ibn Abī al-Aswad), and Ibn Hajar gave Musa's name as Musa ibn Abi Bakr Salim al-Takruri (Arabic: موسى بن أبي بكر سالم التكروري, romanized: Mūsā ibn Abī Bakr Salim al-Takruri).

Musa is often given the title Hajji in oral tradition because he made the hajj. In the Songhai language, rulers of Mali such as Musa were known as the Mali-koi, koi being a title that conveyed authority over a region: in other words, the "ruler of Mali".

== Historical sources ==
Much of what is known about Musa comes from Arabic sources written after his hajj, especially the writings of Al-Umari and Ibn Khaldun. While in Cairo during his hajj, Musa befriended officials such as Ibn Amir Hajib, who learned about him and his country from him and later passed that knowledge to historians such as Al-Umari. Additional information comes from two 17th-century manuscripts written in Timbuktu, the Tarikh Ibn al-Mukhtar (Note: The Tarikh Ibn al-Mukhtar is a historiographical name for an untitled manuscript by Ibn al-Mukhtar. This document is also known as the Tarikh al-Fattash, which Nobili and Mathee have argued is properly the title of a 19th-century document that used Ibn al-Mukhtar's text as a source.) and the Tarikh al-Sudan. Oral tradition, as performed by the jeliw (sing. jeli), also known as griots, includes relatively little information about Musa relative to some other parts of the history of Mali, with his predecessor conquerors receiving more prominence.

== Lineage ==
Nare Maghan (Note: Name from oral tradition)
1. Sunjata	Abu Bakr
2. Uli	Faga Leye (Note: Name from oral tradition)
7. Qu	9. Musa I	11. Sulayman
8. Muhammad	10. Magha I	12. Qanba
13. Mari Jata II
14. Musa II	15. Magha II

Genealogy of the mansas of the Mali Empire up to Magha II (d. c. 1389), based on Levtzion's interpretation of Ibn Khaldun. Numbered individuals reigned as mansa; the numbers indicate the order in which they reigned. (Note: The sixth mansa, Sakura, is omitted from this chart as he was not related to the others. The third and fourth mansas (Wati and Khalifa), brothers of Uli, and the fifth (Abu Bakr), a nephew of Uli, Wati, and Khalifa, are omitted to save space.)

According to Djibril Tamsir Niane, Musa's father was named Faga Leye and his mother may have been named Kanku. (Note: Musa's name Kanku Musa means "Musa son of Kanku", but the genealogy may not be literal.) Faga Leye was the son of Abu Bakr, a brother of Sunjata, the first mansa of the Mali Empire. Ibn Khaldun does not mention Faga Leye, referring to Musa as Musa ibn Abu Bakr. This can be interpreted as either "Musa son of Abu Bakr" or "Musa descendant of Abu Bakr." It is implausible that Abu Bakr was Musa's father, due to the amount of time between Sunjata's reign and Musa's.

Ibn Battuta, who visited Mali during the reign of Musa's brother Sulayman, said that Musa's grandfather was named Sariq Jata. Sariq Jata may be another name for Sunjata, who was actually Musa's great-uncle. This, along with Ibn Khaldun's use of the name 'Musa ibn Abu Bakr' prompted historian Francois-Xavier Fauvelle to propose that Musa was in fact the son of Abu Bakr I, a grandson of Sunjata through his daughter. Later attempts to erase this possibly illegitimate succession through the female line led to the confusion in the sources over Musa's parentage. Hostility towards Musa's branch of the Keita dynasty would also explain his relative absence from or scathing treatment by oral histories.

== Early life and accession to power ==
The date of Musa's birth is unknown, but he appears to have been a young man in 1324. The Tarikh al-fattash claims that Musa accidentally killed Kanku at some point prior to his hajj.

Musa ascended to power in the early 1300s (Note: The exact date of Musa's accession is debated. Ibn Khaldun claims Musa reigned for 25 years, so his accession is dated to 25 years before his death. Musa's death may have occurred in 1337, 1332, or possibly even earlier, giving 1307 or 1312 as plausible approximate years of accession. 1312 is the most widely accepted by modern historians.) under unclear circumstances. According to Musa's own account, his predecessor as Mansa of Mali, presumably Muhammad ibn Qu, launched two expeditions to explore the Atlantic Ocean (200 ships for the first exploratory mission and 2,000 ships for the second). The Mansa led the second expedition himself and appointed Musa as his deputy to rule the empire until he returned. When he did not return, Musa was crowned as mansa himself, marking a transfer of the line of succession from the descendants of Sunjata to the descendants of his brother Abu Bakr. Some modern historians have cast doubt on Musa's version of events, suggesting he may have deposed his predecessor and devised the story about the voyage to explain how he took power. Nonetheless, the possibility of such a voyage has been taken seriously by several historians.

== Early reign ==
Musa was a young man when he became Mansa, possibly in his early twenties. Given the grandeur of his subsequent hajj, Musa likely spent much of his early reign preparing for it. Among these preparations would likely have been raids to capture and enslave people from neighboring lands, as Musa's entourage would include many thousands of slaves; the historian Michael Gomez estimates that Mali may have captured over 6,000 slaves per year for this purpose. Perhaps because of this, Musa's early reign was spent in continuous military conflict with neighboring non-Muslim societies. In 1324, while in Cairo, Musa said that he had conquered 24 cities and their surrounding districts.

== Pilgrimage to Mecca ==
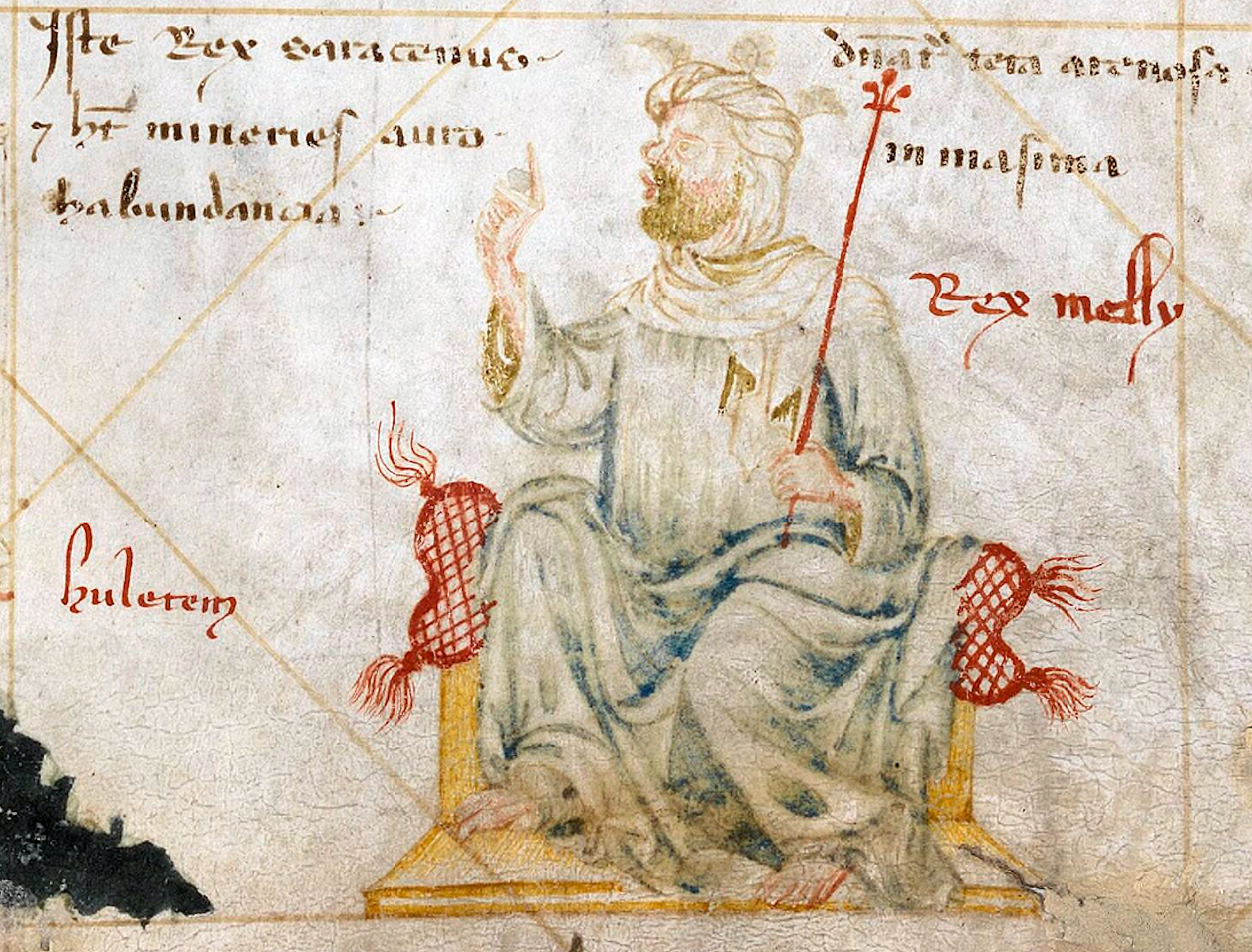
Mansa Moussa (Rex Melly) on the map of Angelino Dulcert (1339)

Musa was a Muslim, and his hajj, or pilgrimage to Mecca, made him well known across North Africa and the Middle East. To Musa, Islam was "an entry into the cultured world of the Eastern Mediterranean". He would have spent much time fostering the growth of the religion within his empire. When Musa departed Mali for the Hajj, he left his son Muhammad to rule in his absence.

Musa made his pilgrimage between 1324 and 1325, spanning 2700 miles. Arabic chroniclers writing after the event give widely varying figures for the size of Musa's caravan and the quantity of gold it transported, and modern historians treat these numbers as rhetorical rather than statistical. According to figures preserved in the later Arabic accounts, his procession included upwards of 12,000 slaves, all wearing brocade and Yemeni silk and each said to have carried 1.8 kg (4 lb) of gold bars, with heralds dressed in silks bearing gold staffs organizing horses and handling bags.

Musa is reported to have provided all necessities for the procession, feeding the entire company of men and animals. The same sources state that the caravan included 80 camels, each said to have carried between 23–136 kg (50–300 lb) of gold dust — a range that itself reflects the absence of any audited contemporary count and is treated by modern historians as an upper-bound literary topos rather than a measurement. Musa is said to have distributed gold to the poor along his route and to the cities he passed through on the way to Mecca, including Cairo and Medina, and reportedly to have built a mosque every Friday. Shihab al-Din al-'Umari, who visited Cairo shortly after the pilgrimage and is the proximate source for most of these accounts, described the procession as "a lavish display of power, wealth, and unprecedented by its size and pageantry".

Musa and his entourage arrived at the outskirts of Cairo in July 1324. They camped for three days by the Pyramids of Giza before crossing the Nile into Cairo on 19 July. (Note: 26 Rajab 724) While in Cairo, Musa met with the Mamluk sultan al-Nasir Muhammad, whose reign had already seen one mansa, Sakura, make the Hajj. Al-Nasir expected Musa to prostrate himself before him, which Musa initially refused to do. When Musa did finally bow he said he was doing so for God alone.

Despite this initial awkwardness, the two rulers got along well and exchanged gifts. Musa and his entourage gave and spent freely while in Cairo. Musa stayed in the Qarafa district of Cairo and befriended its governor, ibn Amir Hajib, who learned much about Mali from him. Musa stayed in Cairo for three months, departing on 18 October (Note: 28 Shawwal) with the official caravan to Mecca.

Musa's generosity continued as he traveled onward to Mecca, and he gave gifts to fellow pilgrims and the people of Medina and Mecca. While in Mecca, conflict broke out between a group of Malian pilgrims and a group of Turkic pilgrims in the Masjid al-Haram. Swords were drawn, but before the situation escalated further, Musa persuaded his men to back down.

Musa and his entourage lingered in Mecca after the last day of the Hajj. Traveling separately from the main caravan, their return journey to Cairo was struck by catastrophe. By the time they reached Suez, many of the Malian pilgrims had died of cold, starvation, or bandit raids, and they had lost much of their supplies. Having run out of money, Musa and his entourage were forced to borrow money and resell much of what they had purchased while in Cairo before the Hajj, and Musa went into debt to several merchants such as Siraj al-Din. However, Al-Nasir Muhammad returned Musa's earlier show of generosity with gifts of his own.

On his return journey, Musa met the Andalusi poet Abu Ishaq al-Sahili, whose eloquence and knowledge of jurisprudence impressed him, and whom he convinced to travel with him to Mali. Other scholars Musa brought to Mali included Maliki jurists.

According to the Tarikh al-Sudan, the cities of Gao and Timbuktu submitted to Musa's rule as he traveled through on his return to Mali. It is unlikely, however, that a group of pilgrims, even if armed, would have been able to conquer a wealthy and powerful city. According to one account given by ibn Khaldun, Musa's general Saghmanja conquered Gao. The other account claims that Gao had been conquered during the reign of Mansa Sakura. Mali's control of Gao may have been weak, requiring powerful mansas to reassert their authority periodically, or it might simply be an error on the part of al-Sadi, author of the Tarikh.

== Later reign ==
=== Construction in Mali ===
According to a long-standing tradition in nineteenth- and twentieth-century historiography, Musa brought architects from Andalusia and Cairo to build his palace in Timbuktu and the great Djinguereber Mosque that still stands, with the Granadan poet Abū Isḥāq al-Sāḥilī commonly credited as the principal designer. Subsequent scholarship has substantially qualified this attribution. J. O. Hunwick has shown that the only project firmly attributable to al-Sāḥilī in the Arabic sources is a royal audience chamber at the city of Mali — for which Ibn Khaldun records a payment of 12,000 mithqals of gold (approximately 51 kg) — and that al-Sāḥilī's role there appears to have been decorative and organizational rather than that of a structural architect. On the broader Sudano-Sahelian tradition, the architectural historian Labelle Prussin has argued that the earthen (banco) architecture of the Niger bend, with its projecting toron beams, represents a centuries-long synthesis of indigenous West African and Islamic design practices rather than an importation from al-Andalus or the Maghreb; modern scholarship accordingly regards the image of al-Sāḥilī as the founder of West African mosque architecture as a historiographical myth rather than an established historical fact. Excavations at Djenné-Djenno by Susan and Roderick McIntosh have established that permanent settlement, complex craft production and iron metallurgy were already present in the Inland Niger Delta by the third century BCE — with long-distance exchange networks attested in subsequent phases of the site — demonstrating that the architectural and urban infrastructure on which Musa's building program drew was an indigenous tradition of substantial antiquity rather than an importation of his reign.

=== Economy and education ===
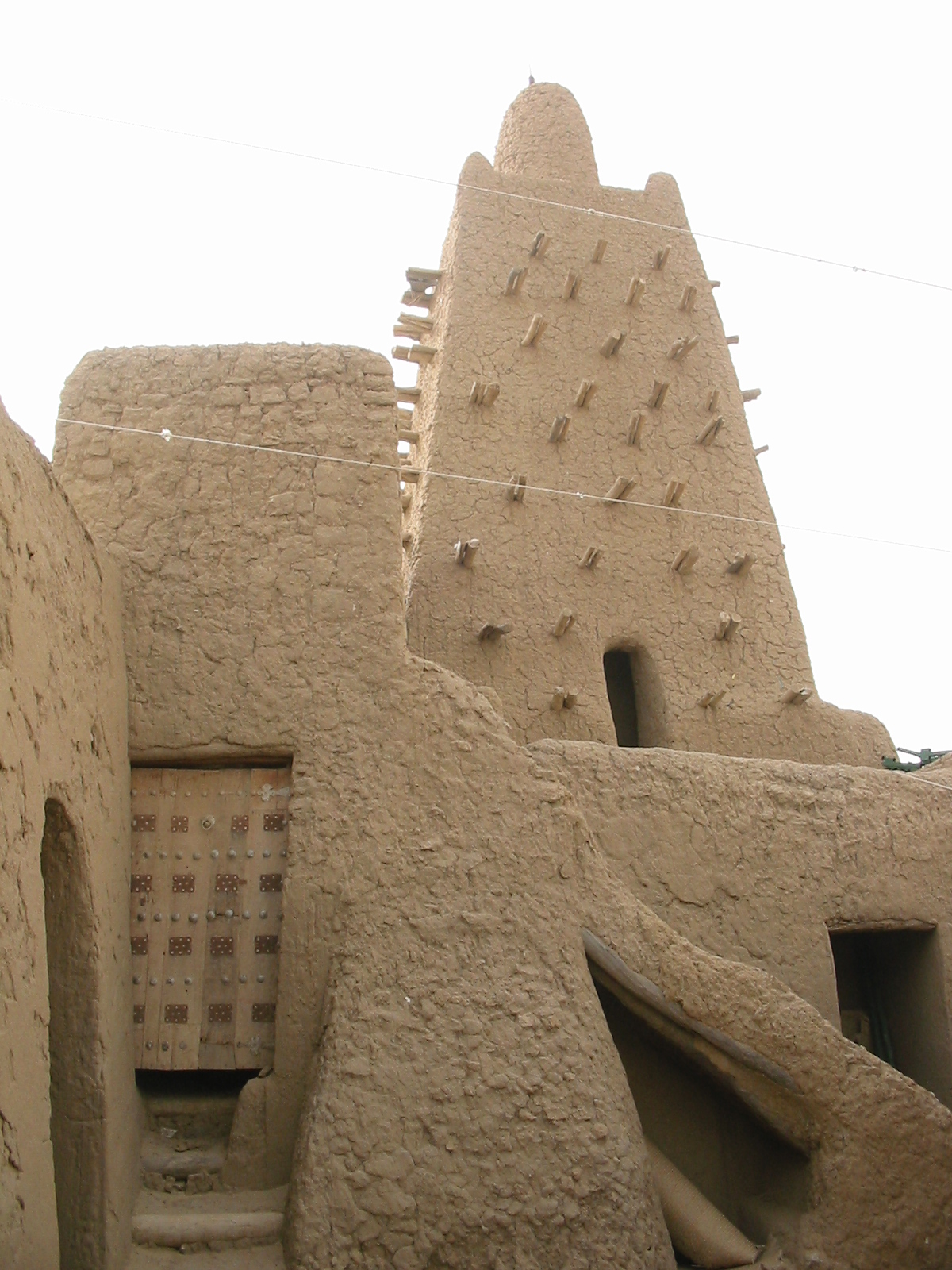
The Djinguereber Mosque, commissioned by Mansa Musa in 1327

Timbuktu soon became the center of trade, culture, and Islam; markets brought in merchants from Hausaland, Egypt, and other African kingdoms, a university was founded in the city (as well as in the Malian cities of Djenné and Ségou), and Islam was spread through the markets and university, making Timbuktu a new area for Islamic scholarship. News of the Malian empire's city of wealth even traveled across the Mediterranean to southern Europe, where traders from Venice, Granada, and Genoa soon added Timbuktu to their maps to trade manufactured goods for gold.

The University of Sankore in Timbuktu was restaffed under Musa's reign with jurists, astronomers, and mathematicians. The university became a center of learning and culture, drawing Muslim scholars from around Africa and the Middle East to Timbuktu.

In 1330, the kingdom of Mossi invaded and conquered the city of Timbuktu. Gao had already been captured by Musa's general, and Musa quickly regained Timbuktu, built a rampart and stone fort, and placed a standing army to protect the city from future invaders. While Musa's palace has since vanished, the university and mosque still stand in Timbuktu.

== Death ==
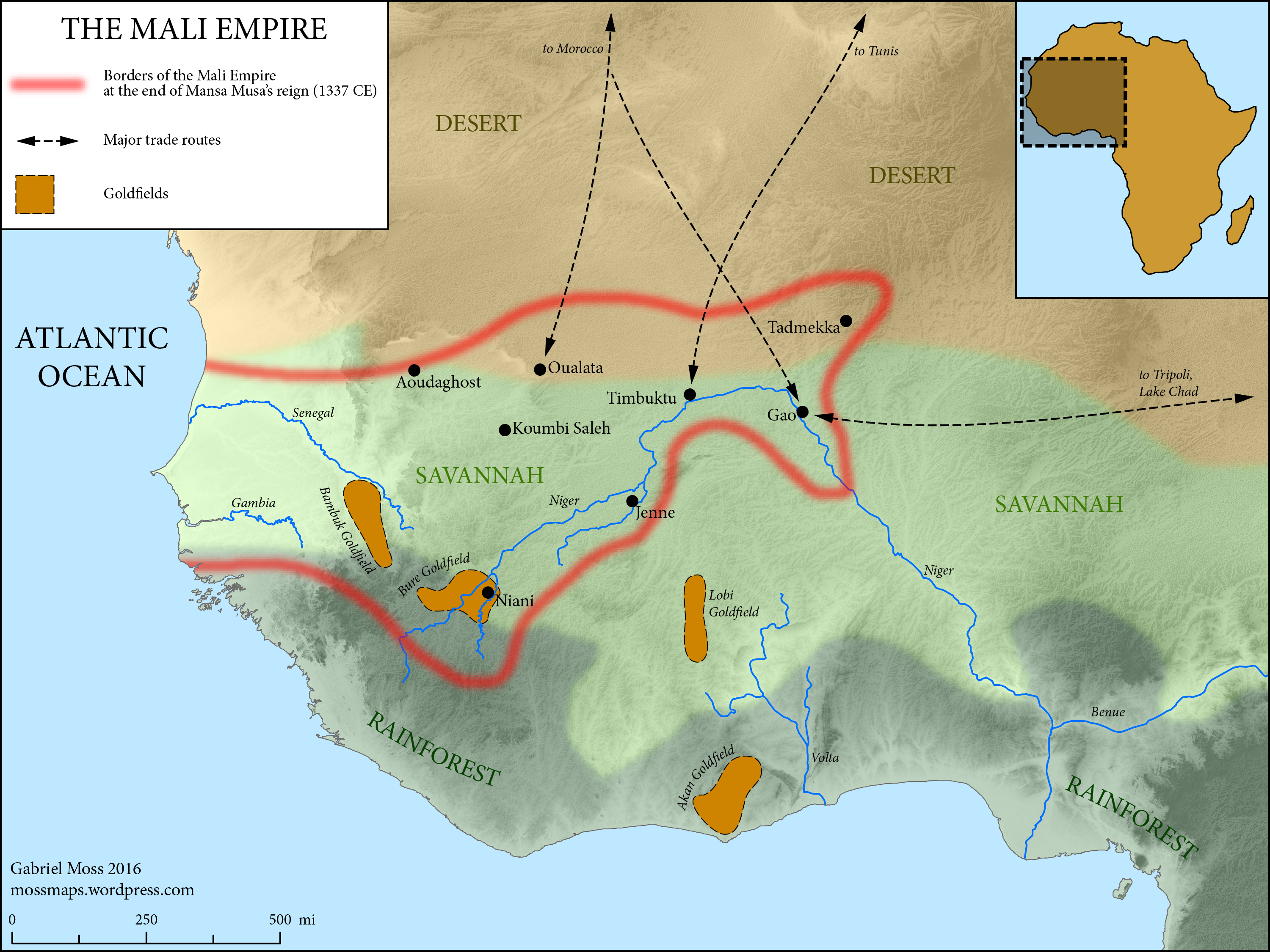
The Mali Empire at the time of Musa's death

The date of Mansa Musa's death is uncertain. Using the reign lengths reported by Ibn Khaldun to calculate back from the death of Mansa Suleyman in 1360, Musa would have died in 1332. However, Ibn Khaldun also reports that Musa sent an envoy to congratulate Abu al-Hasan Ali for his conquest of Tlemcen, which took place in May 1337, but by the time Abu al-Hasan sent an envoy in response, Musa had died and Suleyman was on the throne, suggesting Musa died in 1337. In contrast, al-Umari, writing twelve years after Musa's hajj, in approximately 1337, claimed that Musa returned to Mali intending to abdicate and return to live in Mecca but died before he could do so, suggesting he died even earlier than 1332. It is possible that it was actually Musa's son Maghan who congratulated Abu al-Hasan, or Maghan who received Abu al-Hasan's envoy after Musa's death. The latter possibility is corroborated by Ibn Khaldun calling Suleyman Musa's son in that passage, suggesting he may have confused Musa's brother Suleyman with Musa's son Maghan. Alternatively, it is possible that the four-year reign Ibn Khaldun credits Maghan with actually referred to his ruling Mali while Musa was away on the hajj, and he only reigned briefly in his own right. Nehemia Levtzion regarded 1337 as the most likely date, which has been accepted by other scholars.

== Legacy ==
Musa's reign is commonly regarded as Mali's golden age, but this perception may be the result of his reign being the best recorded by Arabic sources, rather than him necessarily being the wealthiest and most powerful mansa of Mali. The territory of the Mali Empire was at its height during the reigns of Musa and his brother Sulayman, and covered the Sudan-Sahel region of West Africa.

Musa is less renowned in Mandé oral tradition as performed by the jeliw. He is criticized for being unfaithful to tradition, and some of the jeliw regard Musa as having wasted Mali's wealth. However, some aspects of Musa appear to have been incorporated into a figure in Mandé oral tradition known as Fajigi, which translates as "father of hope". Fajigi is remembered as having traveled to Mecca to retrieve ceremonial objects known as boliw, which feature in Mandé traditional religion. As Fajigi, Musa is sometimes conflated with a figure in oral tradition named Fakoli, who is best known as Sunjata's top general. The figure of Fajigi combines both Islam and traditional beliefs.

The name "Musa" has become virtually synonymous with pilgrimage in Mandé tradition, such that other figures who are remembered as going on a pilgrimage, such as Fakoli, are also called Musa.

=== Other maps depicting Mansa Musa or Mansa Musa like figures ===
In 1525 Sicilian mapmaker Jacopo Russo created the Mansa Musa Map in honor of him. This tradition of showcasing a wealthy west African monarch goes back to Angelino Dulcert's 1339 map, the 1375 Catalan Atlas and several other European maps that were inspired by Mansa Musa's Hadj.

Jacopo Russo's map closeup continuing the tradition of showcasing an African monarch selling gold to merchants centuries after Mansa Musa's death

Another map made in Ancona, Italy (around 1529) by Conte di Ottomanno Freducci. He is depicted as white in a European style. Text translated from Latin: ‘This king Mansa Musa rules the province of Guinea and is no less prudent and knowledgeable than powerful. He has with him excellent mathematicians and men versed in the liberal arts, and he has great riches, as he is near the branch of the Nile which is called the Gulf of Gold. From this is brought a great quantity of gold dust or tibr, and this is a passage through his kingdom, and these regions abound in all the things that there are above the ground, particularly in dates and manna, and the best of all other things that can be had — they only lack salt'.

Details of African rulers, the ‘Emperor of Mali’, ‘King of Nubia’ and ‘Manicongo’, (Ruler of kingdom of Kongo) from the Queen Mary Atlas (completed 1558) by Diogo Homem

=== Wealth ===
Mansa Musa is renowned for his affluence and generosity, and has become "a symbol of fabulous wealth". While several online articles in the 21st century have claimed that Mansa Musa was the richest person of all time, historians such as Hadrien Collet have argued that Musa's wealth is impossible to calculate accurately. Contemporary Arabic sources may have been trying to express that Musa had more gold than they thought possible, rather than trying to give an exact number. Musa himself further promoted the appearance of having vast, inexhaustible wealth by spreading rumors that gold grew like a plant in his kingdom. Encyclopedia Britannica states that he is "widely considered to be the wealthiest person in history".

According to some Arabic writers, Musa's gift-giving caused a depreciation in the value of gold in Egypt. Al-Umari said that before Musa's arrival a mithqal of gold was worth 25 silver dirhams, but that it dropped to less than 22 dirhams afterward and did not go above that number for at least twelve years. Though this has been described as having "wrecked" Egypt's economy, the historian Warren Schultz has argued that this was well within normal fluctuations in the value of gold in Mamluk Egypt. According to Graham Abney this flooding of Egypt's economy may have been a deliberate attempt by Musa of flexing Mali as a great power once he got there. Estimates that Musa brought as much as 18 tons of gold on his hajj — figures sometimes glossed in modern media as equivalent to billions of US dollars — are reconstructions extrapolated from the same al-Umari and Ibn Khaldun reportage, and reflect a single chain of transmission rather than independent attestation. The conversion of such figures into modern monetary equivalents is regarded by historians as methodologically unsound, given both the gap between fourteenth-century Sahelian gold-economy logic and modern asset valuation and the difficulty of separating the personal wealth of a monarch from that of the state.

The idea of a West African monarch being the wealthiest in the world predates Mansa Musa by over 300 years; Ibn Hawqal (951) stated: “The king of Ghana is the wealthiest king on the face of the earth because of his treasures and stocks of gold extracted in olden times for his predecessors and himself.” He goes on to describe the same empire’s oppressive need for imported salt.

The wealth of the Mali Empire did not come from direct control of gold-producing regions, but rather from trade and tribute. These trade routes extended as far south as the Akan Forest in the modern country of Ghana, which was formerly known as the Gold Coast (not to be confused with the Ghana Empire). In the late 15th century, the Portuguese were obtaining 400-550 kilos (880-1,200 pounds) of gold per year from this region through trade. The earliest city of the Akan people was Bono Manso and was an important trade connection with Djenné. The gold Musa brought on his pilgrimage probably represented years of accumulated tribute that Musa would have spent much of his early reign gathering. Another source of income for Mali during Musa's reign was taxation of the copper trade.

According to several contemporary authors, such as Ibn Battuta, Ibn al-Dawadari and al-Umari, Mansa Musa ran out of money during his journey to Mecca and had to sell property and borrow from Egyptian merchants at a high rate of interest on his return journey. Al-Umari and Ibn Khaldun state that the moneylenders were either never repaid or only partly repaid. Other sources disagree as to whether they were eventually and fully compensated.

== Appearance and character ==
According to Ibn Kathir, "He was a handsome young man." Ibn Habib al-Halabi, a contemporary of Ibn Kathir, described Musa as a "young man, brown-skinned, with a pleasant face and handsome appearance."

Arabic writers, such as Ibn Battuta and Abdallah ibn Asad al-Yafii, praised Musa's generosity, virtue, and intelligence. Ibn Khaldun said that he "was an upright man and a great king, and tales of his justice are still told."

== Footnotes ==
Regnal titles
Preceded by Muhammad ibn Qu	Mansa of the Mali Empire; 1312–1337	Succeeded by Maghan
