= Moustapha Dicko =

Malian politician

Moustapha Dicko is president of Malian Parliamentarian group ADEMA-PASJ and a member of the Pan-African Parliament.

== Early life ==
Mustapha Dicko holds a bachelor's degree in modern literature. He attended the Ecole Normale Supérieure in Bamako where he obtained a master's degree in Russian.

Later, he also became holder of a PHD in Russian literature. Moustaph Dicko successively became a professor at Ensup, a deputy in the National Assembly, an African Parliamentary deputy and Chief of Staff to the president of the National Assembly.

Moustapha Dicko was a professor at ISFRA until his appointment as Minister of Higher Education and Scientific research in the government of Oumar Tatam Ly.

Married and father of four children, Moustapha Dicko Dicko loves reading, cinema, walking and music..
