= Djeneba Seck =

African singer and actress (born 1970)

- Born: 1970 (age 55–56); Bamako
- Occupation: Singer

Djeneba Seck (born 1970) is an African singer and actress born in Bamako, Mali. Her family's roots are in Kita, a town famous for its music. In 1986 she met Sekou Kouyate who took her on as a backing vocalist for his band. They had a hit song called "N'Kadignon Ye".
