= Kassa (mansa) =

Qasa

Mansa of Mali
- Reign: c. 1360
- Predecessor: Sulayman
- Successor: Mari Djata II
- Died: c. 1360
- Dynasty: Keita
- Father: Sulayman

Qasa (Arabic: قسا, romanized: Qasā; d. c. 1360), in oral tradition also known as Kamba, was a short-lived mansa of the Mali Empire. He succeeded his father, Sulayman, and reigned for only nine months. A civil war broke out after Sulayman's death, which Sulayman's great-nephew Jata won by late 1360.

Charles Monteil suggested that Qasa was the son of Sulayman's first principal wife, Qasa, due to the practice of matronymics. Nehemia Levtzion considered this unlikely, as a matronymic name would combine the name of the mother and name of the son, as in Kanku Musa, "Musa son of Kanku", rather than being the name of the mother alone, and furthermore, qasā means "queen" and was probably the title of Sulayman's wife, not her personal name. Moreover, the name of Mansa Qasa is also recorded as Fanbā, Qanbā, or Qanbatā in some manuscripts, and so may be unconnected with Sulayman's wife Qasa. Michael Gomez suggested that Mansa Qasa was Qasa herself, ruling in her own right.

Preceded by Suleyman	Mansa of the Mali Empire; 1360	Succeeded by Mari Diata II
