= Aoua Kéita =

Malian politician (1912–1980)

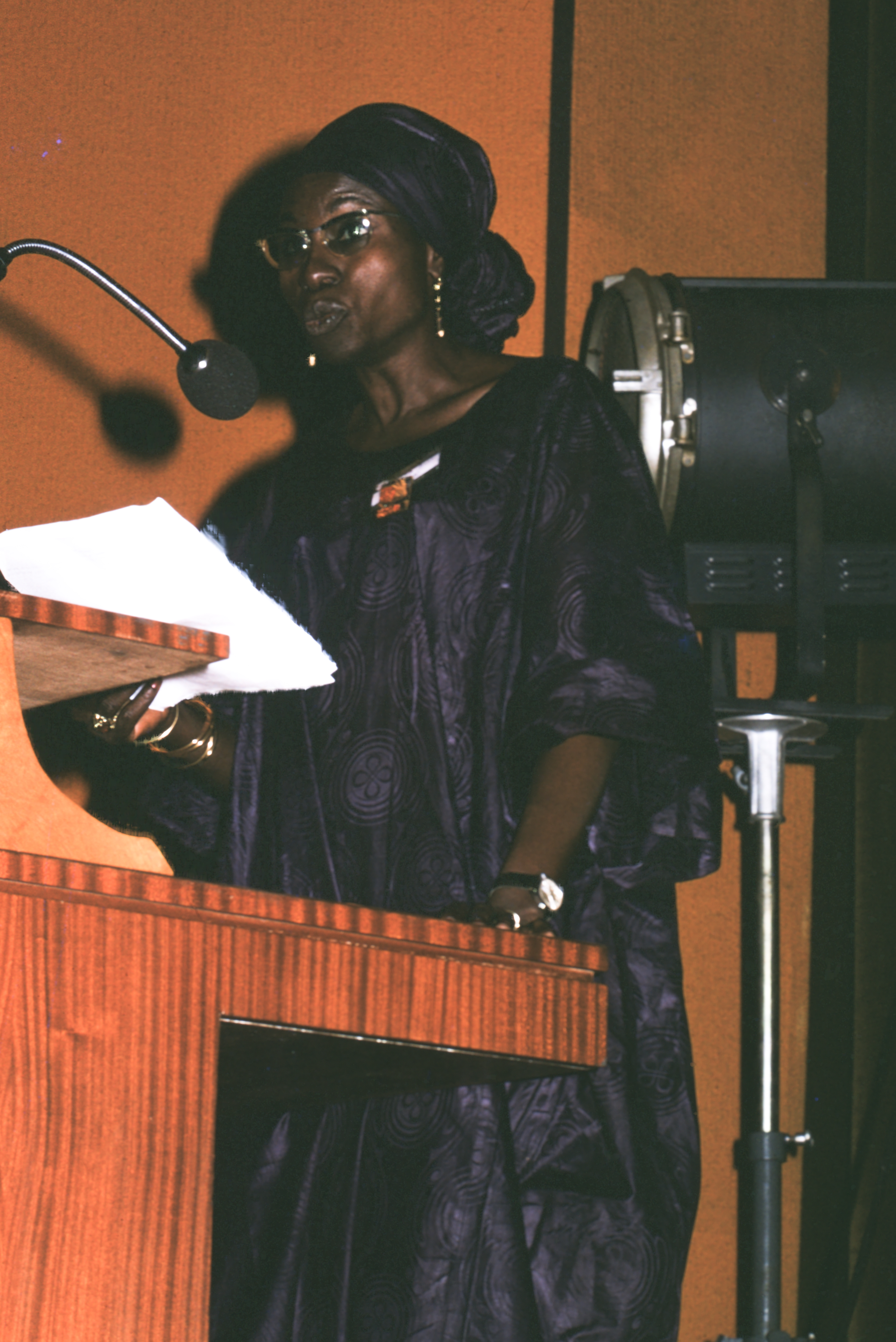
- Aoua Kéita, 1975
- Born: Aoua Kéita; 12 July 1912; Bamako, French Sudan
- Died: 7 May 1980 (aged 67); Bamako, Mali
- Occupations: midwife, writer, politician
- Writing career
- Language: French

Aoua Kéita (12 July 1912 in Bamako, French Sudan – 7 May 1980 in Bamako, Mali) was a Malian independence activist, politician and writer.

Kéita in 1959 became the first woman to be elected for a parliamentary seat in a colonial African country. She gained fame in the fight for independence from colonial rule and in 1960 assumed political office in Mali when Modibo Keïta established a socialist regime.

== Education ==
She was born in Bamako in what was then French Sudan. Her father, Karamogo Kéita, was from Guinea, fought in World War I and was a member of the colonial hygiene service. Her mother, Miriam Coulibaly, was from Ivory Coast.

In 1923, her father sent Aoua to the first girls' school in Bamako, over the opposition of her mother. In 1928, she graduated from Bamako's foyer des métisses, a boarding school primarily for mixed-race girls to which a few Africans were allowed to enroll. Three years later, she completed her studies at the École de Médecine de Dakar and became a midwife. She went to work for the colonial government, being posted to Gao for 12 years.

== Political career ==
In 1935, she married a doctor, Daouda Diawara, who aroused her interest in politics. They joined the political party Rassemblement Démocratique Africain (African Democratic Assembly; RDA) upon its founding in 1946. That year, she assisted at the birth of Alpha Oumar Konaré, a future two-term President of Mali, at Kayes. Kéita and Diawara divorced in 1949 under pressure from Diawara's mother, when it became clear that Kéita could not have children. She was punished for her anti-colonial activism by being assigned to more and more remote locations, including Gao in 1950 and Nara in the mid-1950s. In 1951, she renounced her French citizenship and campaigned for the RDA in the 1951 French election, the party winning three parliamentary seats. As the RDA gained power, she rose through its ranks. In September 1958, she was elected to the RDA's executive body, the Bureau Politique National. In 1959, she was elected to Parliament, representing Sikasso. She was also appointed to the committee charged with drafting the constitution of the Sudanese Republic (an early name for Mali). She became the first woman in the Francophone West African Countries to be elected as a National Legislative Assembly in her country.

Mali gained its independence in 1960. That year, she was the only woman elected to the new National Assembly and the only woman within the party leadership. She also served as secretary-general of the Commission Sociale des Femmes upon its establishment in 1962. She was essential in the drafting and enacting of the Marriage and Guardianship Code, which granted new rights to Malian women. In the 1960s, however, she was pushed out of power in the increasingly radicalised RDA by a longtime rival, Mariam Keïta, the senior wife of the first President of Mali, Modibo Keïta.

In 1966, she gave up her midwife duties. When Modibo Keïta was overthrown in a 1968 coup d'état, she left the country. In the 1970s, she and her second husband, Djimé Diallo, lived in Brazzaville, Republic of the Congo. She published her autobiography in 1975; Femme d’Afrique. La vie d’Aoua Kéita racontée par elle-même recounted her life up to the 1950s. When conditions improved in Mali and deteriorated in the Congo, they moved to Bamako in 1979, where she died the following year.

She received numerous awards and honours from Mali.
