= École de maintien de la paix Alioune Blondin Beye =

School in Mali

Coordinates: 12.6267°N 8.0191°W

Alioune Blondin Beye Peacekeeping School
- École de maintien de la paix Alioune Blondin Beye de Bamako
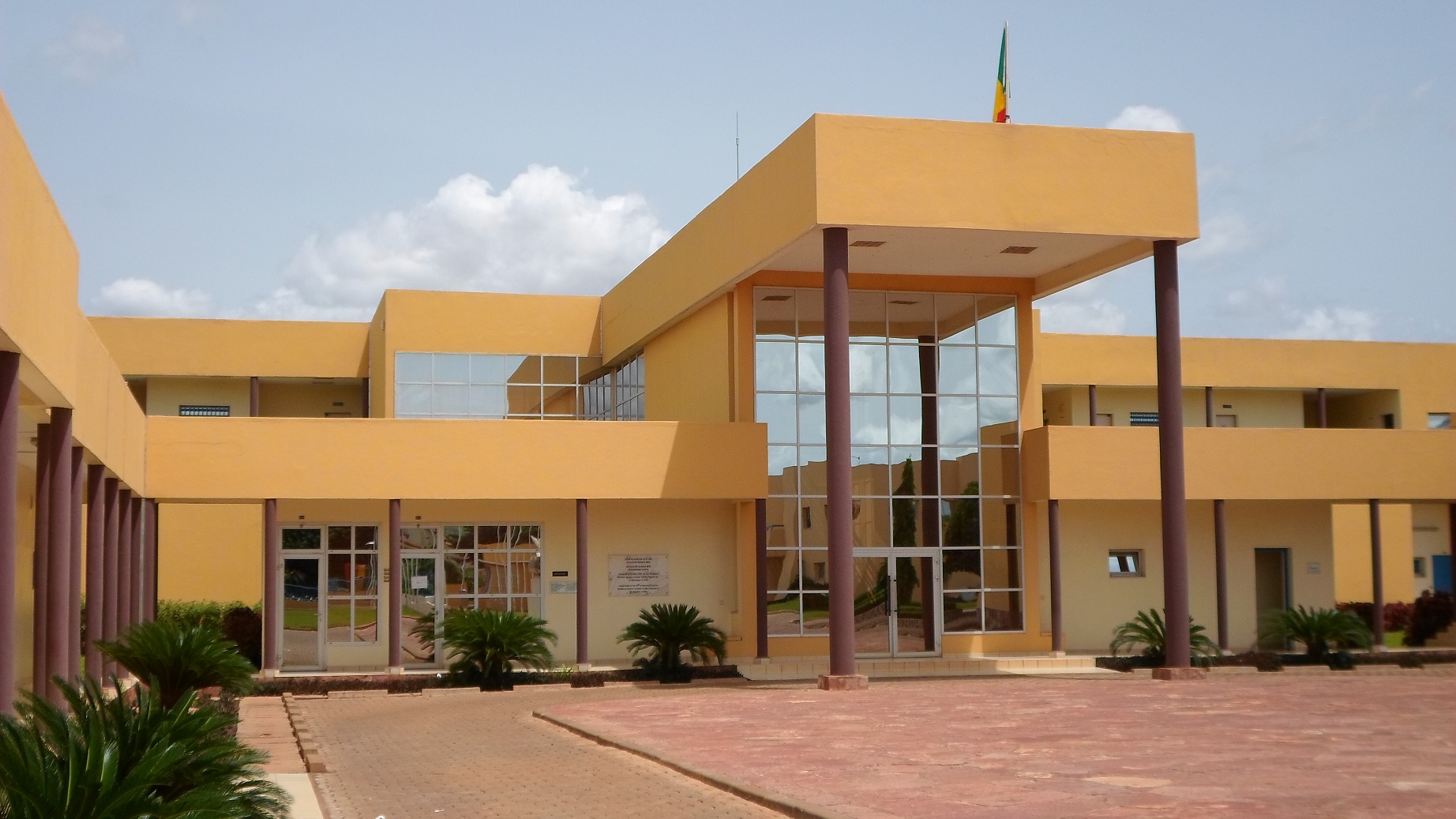
- Instruction Building of the school
- Formation: 1999
- Type: Training center
- Location: Bamako, Mali
- Affiliations: ECOWAS, APSTA

The Alioune Blondin Beye Peacekeeping School of Bamako (EMP) is a center in Mali designed to train African civilian and military leaders in peace support operations (PSO), at both fundamental and tactical levels.

== History ==
In 2007, the school was named in memory of Alioune Blondin Beye, a Malian professor, lawyer, and politician who served as Minister of Youth, Sports, Arts and Culture, and later as Minister of Foreign Affairs of Mali. He was also a member of the African Commission on Human and Peoples' Rights. During the Angolan civil war, he was appointed in June 1993 as the Special Representative of the UN Secretary-General (SRSG). He led the UN Verification Mission (UNAVEM II and UNAVEM III) from June 1993 to June 1997, and the UN Observer Mission (MONUA) from July 1997 to June 1998. He died in a plane crash off the coast of Côte d'Ivoire on June 26, 1998, while on a UN mission.

== List of Commandants ==
=== Malian Directors ===
1. 2007–2012: Brigadier General Souleymane Y. Sidibé
2. 2012–2014: Major General Mahamane Touré
3. 2014–2017: Brigadier General Moussa Sinko Coulibaly
4. 2018: Colonel Issa Coulibaly (interim director)
5. 2018–2019: Brigadier General Cheick Fanta Mady Dembélé
6. 2019–present: Brigadier General Mody Berethé

== See also ==
- Peacebuilding
- Peacekeeping
- Malian Armed Forces
- European Union Training Mission in Mali
