= Ahmed Diane Semega =

Malian politician

Ahmed Diane Semega is a Malian politician. He is the former Minister of Mines, Energy and Water, and the current Minister of Infrastructure and Transport.
