= Fatou Haidara =

Malian politician and youngest female minister

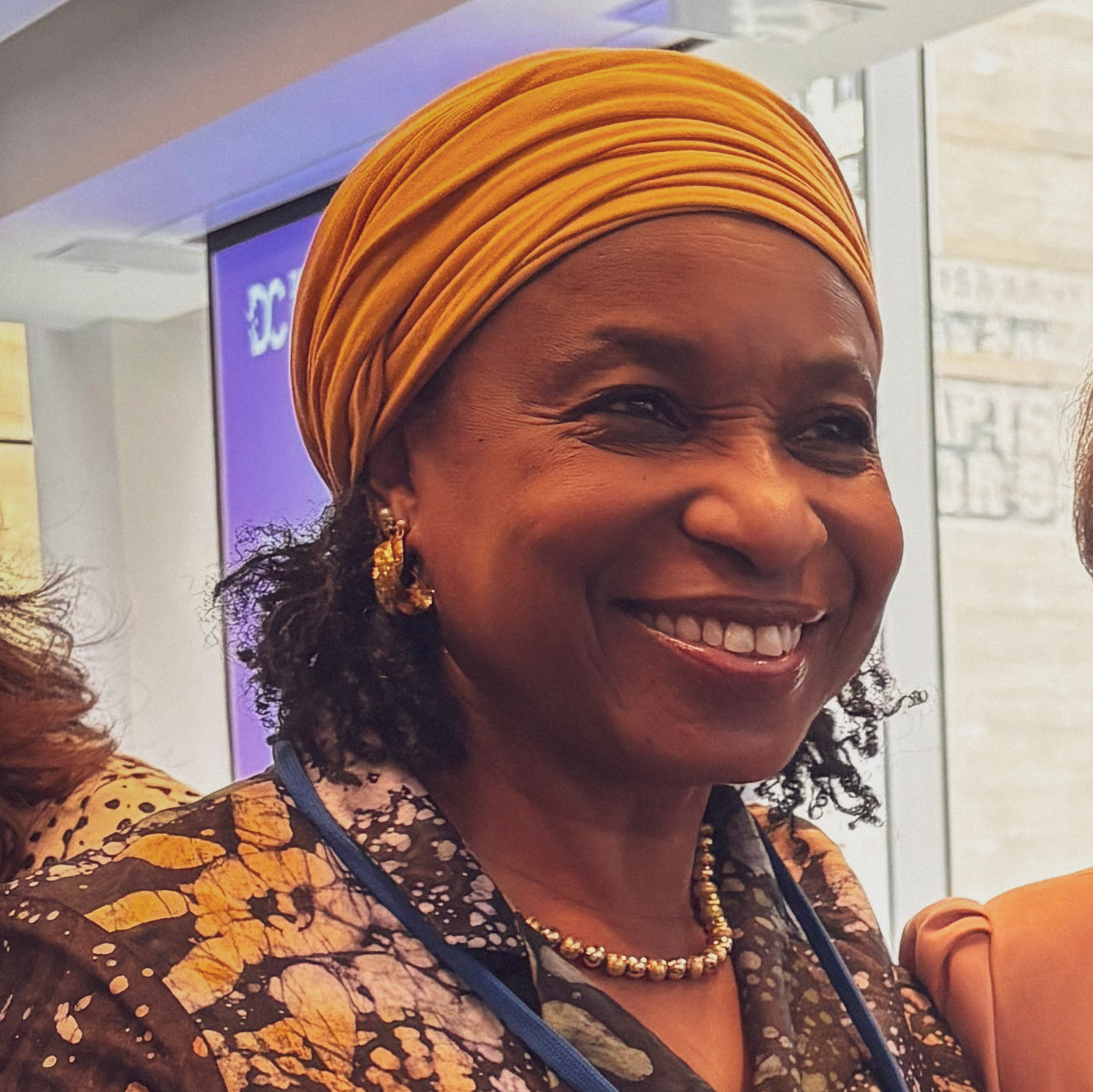
- UNIDO's Deputy DG Fatou Haidara in 2025
- Born: 16 August 1962 (age 64); Mopti, Mali
- Education: University of Reims Champagne-Ardenne, Economics and Business Management (BA), Economics and Business Management (MBA)
- Occupations: International Civil Servant, Deputy to the Director General and Managing Director of the Directorate of Global Partnerships and External Relations at UNIDO
- Employer: UNIDO
- Known for: Youngest minister appointed in Mali's history, Advocate for Women Empowerment and Industrial Development in Africa
- Term: 1 June 2022—
- Awards: Commandeur de l'Ordre National du Mali

Fatou Haidara (born 16 August 1962) is a Malian international civil servant and former government minister. Appointed in 1992 at the age of 29, she was the youngest minister in the history of the Republic of Mali. She has served as the Deputy Director-General of the United Nations Industrial Development Organization since 2022.

== Early life and education ==
Haidara was born in Mopti, Mali. She holds a bachelor's degree in economics and business management and an MBA from the University of Reims Champagne-Ardenne in France.

== Early professional career ==
Haidara began her career at Mali's Centre for Studies and Industrial Promotion (CEPI), a government research body.

She went on to direct the International Labour Organization (ILO) project "Appui aux femmes entrepreneurs", which supported women entrepreneurs.

Following World Bank structural adjustment measures that obliged Mali to freeze civil service recruitment, Haidara co-led a training programme for graduates entering the country's expanding non-governmental sector, working with the Association malienne de recherche-action pour le développement (AMRAD). This work established her as a spokesperson for civil society and the social economy.

== Political career ==
In 1992 Haidara was appointed to the first democratically elected government of Mali, under President Alpha Oumar Konaré. She was not a member of any political party and was brought into government from civil society as a technical appointment. She was 29, and became the youngest minister in the country's history. Her portfolio was Employment and Vocational Training, which also covered private sector promotion between April and November 1993. As Minister of Employment and Vocational Training she established the Mali Volunteer Corps, created in response to the graduate unemployment caused by the freeze on civil service recruitment.

In November 1993 she was appointed Minister of Crafts and Tourism, a department later expanded to include industry, and she initiated an annual regional entrepreneurial crafts fair in Bamako. From September 1997 until a government reshuffle in February 2000 she held the Industry, Commerce and Crafts portfolio, promoting Mali's private sector. During her tenure she oversaw the creation of a national betting partnership, the Société du pari mutuel urbain (PMU Mali), which began operations in September 1994 and became a significant source of state revenue. She also organized the first Mali Trade Fair, which drew participants from neighbouring states.

Across her years in government, she took part in policy formulation and in negotiations with the Bretton Woods institutions and other development partners, and led Malian ministerial delegations to international forums, including the first World Trade Organization (WTO) Ministerial Conference in Seattle in 1999. On leaving the government, she said that "being a minister is not a job, it is a mission", and that she felt her mission had been fulfilled.

== UNIDO ==
Haidara joined United Nations Industrial Development Organization (UNIDO) in 2004 as Director of the Africa Programme. In 2006, she was appointed Director of the Special Programmes Group, and in January 2011 Director of Policymaking Organs Secretariat, Advocacy and Communications. In 2013, she coordinated UNIDO's 15th General Conference with the Government of Peru, at which member states adopted the Lima Declaration. The declaration committed UNIDO member states to inclusive and sustainable industrial development as the organisation's central mandate. She was promoted to be UNIDO's Managing Director of the Directorate of Global Partnerships and External Relations in 2018 and a Deputy Director-General in 2022. Her work at the organization has covered strategic partnerships, UNIDO's programmes in Africa and in least developed countries, South-South cooperation, human security, youth employment and women's economic empowerment.

== Advocacy for women and civil society ==
Haidara has spoken publicly on women's participation in the economy. At a 2015 International Women's Day event in Vienna following a screening of the documentary, The Supreme Price, she said that "education is key when it comes to empowering women" and that "as women we have to prove ourselves every day to show we deserve trust and confidence", describing her own experience as a woman in Malian politics. She noted that her first involvement with UNIDO had been a project addressing poverty among women in rural areas.

Writing in 1998, Haidara described decentralised democratic governance as "an idea and a reality that has given a voice to women".

In a 2026 interview with Africa Renewal marking Africa's fourth industrial decade, she discussed the steps needed to turn the African Union's industrialization mandate into practice, in the context of Agenda 2063.
