= Abdou Traoré =

Abdou Traoré may refer to the name of three footballers:

- Abdou Traoré (footballer, born 1981), Malian footballer
- Abdou Traoré (footballer, born 1988), Malian footballer
- Abdou Razack Traoré (born 1988), Burkanese-Ivorian footballer who plays for Turkish club Konyaspor
