= Sira Diop =

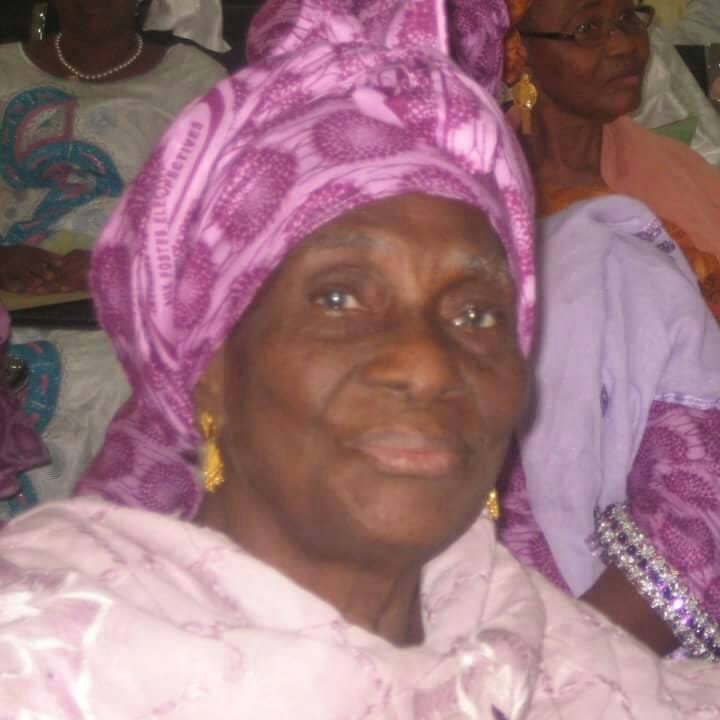
Sira Diop

Sira Diop née Sakiliba Sissiki (31 March 1929 – 17 November 2013) was a Malian educator, feminist and trade unionist. The first woman to pass the Sudanese baccalauréat in 1950, as a teacher she ultimately became headmistress of the Malian lycée (high school) for girls (1962–65). An active trade unionist, she was president of organizations including the Union nationale des femmes du Mali (National Union of Women in Mali). Internationally, she represented Mali in UNICEF and the World Health Organization.

== Early life and education ==
Born on 31 March 1929 in Ségou, Sakiliba Sissoko graduated as a teacher from the Normal School in Rufisque, Senegal, and went on to become the first woman in Mali to pass the Sudanese baccalauréat in 1950 and the first to become a primary school inspector in 1961.

== Career ==
The wife of Moctar Diop, in addition to her teaching Sira Diop was a committed trades unionist. She was a founding member of the Sudanese Intersyndicale des femmes travailleuses and of the Union des femmes travailleuses. While president of the Union des femmes du Soudan (Sudanese Women's Union), in July 1959, she was behind the creations of the Union des femmes de l'ouest africain (Union of Women of West Africa). From 1977 to 1980, she also headed the Union nationale des femmes du Mali (National Union of Women of Mali).

She embarked on her career as a teacher in 1951. She taught at the girls' lycée (now Lycée Ba Aminata Diallo), where from 1962 to 1965 she was the first Malian woman to become a high school principal. In 1971, she received an assignment from the Ministry of Education in connection with the problems of girls' education. Internationally, in the 1970s she worked with UNESCO, UNICEF and the World Health Organization.

Sira Diop died in Bamako on 17 November 2013, aged 84.

== Awards and honours ==
Siop Diop was widely recognized for her service. In 2005, she received the distinction of Grand Officier of the National Order of Mali (2005). She was also honoured as a knight of Senegal's National Order of the Lion and of Guinea's National Order of Merit.
