= Sulayman of Mali =

Sulayman

Mansa of Mali
- Reign: c. 1340 – c. 1359
- Predecessor: Magha I
- Successor: Qasa, son of Sulayman
- Co-ruler: Qasa, wife of Sulayman (until 1352 or 1353)
- Died: c. 1359
- Spouses: Qasa, wife of Sulayman; Banju
- Issue: Qasa, son of Sulayman
- Dynasty: Keita
- Religion: Islam

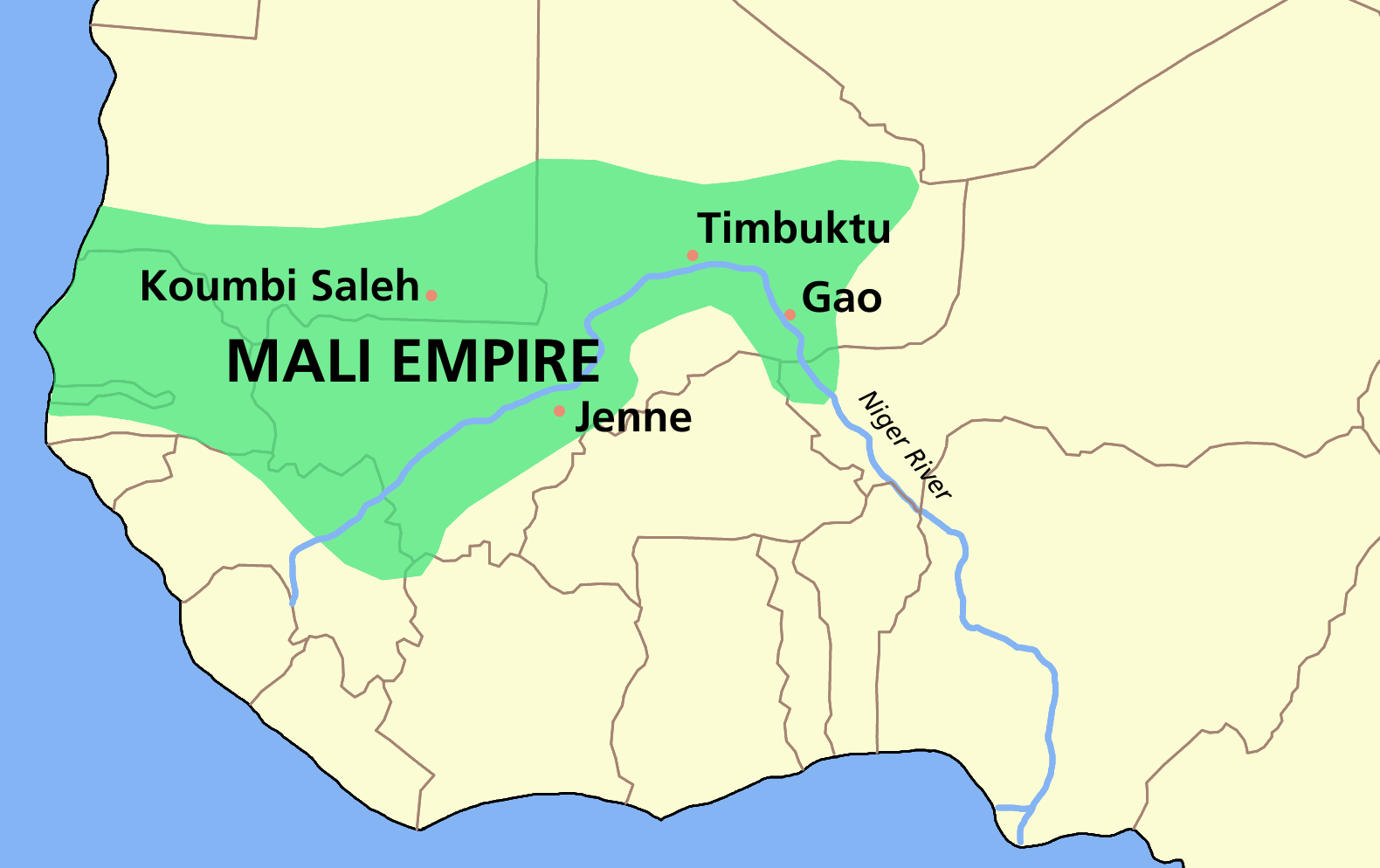
The Mali Empire in Sulayman's time

Mansa Sulayman (Arabic: منسا سليمان, romanized: Mansā Sulaymān; d. c. 1359) was mansa of the Mali Empire during the middle of the 14th century. He was the brother of Mansa Musa and succeeded Musa's son Magha as mansa.

As mansa, Sulayman continued the diplomatic relations with the Marinid Sultanate that had been initiated by his brother. In 1352 or 1353, Sulayman accused his principal wife, Qasa, of conspiring to overthrow him. Sulayman died c. 1359 and was succeeded by his son, also named Qasa, who would reign for only nine months. Soon after Sulayman's death, civil war broke out, and Magha's son Jata, who may have been part of the earlier conspiracy to overthrow Sulayman, seized power.

Ibn Battuta, an explorer from the Marinid Sultanate, traveled to Mali in 1352 to visit Sulayman's court. His account of his travels, the Tuhfat an-Nuzzar, provides the most detailed known firsthand account of the Mali Empire at its height.

Ibn Battuta compared Sulayman unfavorably to his brother, regarding him as a miser in comparison to Musa's renowned generosity. Sulayman is regarded as the last great ruler of the Mali Empire, and his death and the ensuing civil war are considered to mark the end of Mali's golden age.

== Biography ==
Sulayman was the grandson of Abu Bakr, brother of the Mali Empire's founder Sunjata. Sulayman's brother Musa ruled as mansa for twenty-five years and was succeeded by his son Magha. Magha reigned for only four years and was succeeded by Sulayman. The historian Nehemia Levtzion has suggested that, as the eldest male member of the ruling dynasty, Sulayman was Musa's rightful successor, but Musa passed him over in favor of Magha. Levtzion further suggests that Sulayman may have deposed Magha, and Magha's son Jata may have fled into exile.

Sulayman's principal wife and co-ruler was his cousin Qasa. (Note: Qasa means "queen" and as such was presumably a title, not her given name) Soon after his accession to the throne, Sulayman received gifts from Abu al-Hasan, the Marinid sultan, which he had sent in response to a delegation Musa had sent him following the Marinid conquest of Tlemcen in 1337. (Note: Ibn Khaldun's description of these events is contradictory, so it is possible that it was actually Magha who received the gifts) In 1348 or 1349, after the Marinid conquest of Ifriqiya, Sulayman sent another delegation to Abu al-Hasan to congratulate him. The Black Death, which broke out in Europe and North Africa during Sulayman's reign, may have affected Sulayman's diplomatic policy, but it does not seem to have reached Mali itself until some time after 1352–1353.

After Abu al-Hasan's death in 1351, Sulayman's court held a memorial feast for him in 1352, which was attended by the Moroccan explorer Ibn Battuta, who had recently arrived in Mali. Two months later, during Ramadan, Ibn Battuta complained to Sulayman about the meagreness of the reception gift he had initially received from him, and Sulayman arranged for Ibn Battuta to receive lodgings and a gift of gold. While Ibn Battuta was in Mali, Sulayman imprisoned his principal wife Qasa and replaced her with one of his other wives, Banju. Unlike Qasa, Banju was not of royal blood. Facing criticism from his court, Sulayman accused Qasa of conspiring to overthrow him with an exiled member of the royal family named Jatil, who may have been Magha's son. (Note: Ibn Battuta describes the relationship Jatil has to Sulayman with the term ibn amm, which literally means "son of a paternal uncle", but he may have simply meant Jatil was a male-line relative of Sulayman. Levtzion suggests that this Jatil is likely to be the same as Mansa Jata, a son of Magha who seized power in 1360.) Sulayman obtained a confession from one of Qasa's slaves, and his court pronounced a death sentence on Qasa, who sought sanctuary with the khatib. Qasa's fate is not recorded.

Sulayman continued to pursue diplomacy with the Marinid Sultanate, and was preparing another delegation bearing gifts for the sultan when he died. He was succeeded by his son Qasa. (Note: Different manuscript copies spell the name variously as Qasa, Qanba, Fanba, or Qanbata. Whether there is a connection to Sulayman's wife Qasa is unknown.) Qasa reigned only nine months. Soon after Sulayman's death, civil war broke out, and Sulayman's great-nephew Jata, son of Magha—possibly the same as the Jatil who had conspired to overthrow Sulayman in 1352–1353—seized power.

=== Dates ===
The dates of the beginning and end of Sulayman's reign are not precisely known, and the evidence provided by the available primary sources is contradictory.

According to Ibn Khaldun, a caravan bearing gifts sent by Mansa Jata soon after he took power arrived in Fez in December 1360 or January 1361. (Note: The caravan arrived in Ṣafar, AH 762, which corresponds to approximately 11 December 1360–8 January 1361 in the Julian calendar) As at least nine months must have passed between Sulayman's death and Jata sending the caravan, in order to fit Qasa's reign, Sulayman's death must have occurred no later than early 1360. Maurice Delafosse regarded Sulayman's reign as having ended in 1359. Djibril Tamsir Niane regarded Sulayman's reign as having ended in 1358 or 1359. In a 1963 paper, Nehemia Levtzion regarded Sulayman as having died at the beginning of 1360, but elsewhere, he and John F. P. Hopkins regarded Sulayman as having died in about 1358–1359. John Hunwick and David Conrad both used the 1360 date.

According to Ibn Khaldun, Sulayman reigned for 24 years. (Note: A year in the Islamic calendar is slightly shorter than a solar year.) If Sulayman died in 1360, this would indicate he became mansa in approximately 1336, which is the year Delafosse and Niane regarded Sulayman's reign as beginning. However, this is contradicted by Ibn Khaldun's indication that Musa was still alive in 1337, as he says Musa sent a delegation to Abu al-Hasan after his conquest of Tlemcen in 1337. (Note: 22 or 27 Ramadan 737 AH) The time between the conquest of Tlemcen and arrival of Jata's delegation is too short to accommodate the reign lengths Ibn Khaldun attributes to Magha, Sulayman, and Qasa. It is possible that it was Maghan, rather than Musa, who sent the delegation in 1337, but this nonetheless leaves Sulayman's reign at least a year shorter than reported by Ibn Khaldun. Ibn Khaldun reports that Magha ruled for four years; if Musa died in 1337, this would place the beginning of Sulayman's reign in 1341, though it is possible that some of the four years attributed to Magha refer to him serving as viceroy during his father's hajj. Conrad and Hunwick have both listed 1341 as the beginning of Sulayman's reign.

== Legacy ==
The reigns of Musa and Sulayman have been considered the apex of Malian power. Ibn Battuta remarked positively on the security of the Mali Empire during Sulayman's reign, noting that there was no need to worry about thieves. However, Sulayman's legacy has suffered from unfavorable comparisons to his more renowned brother, and Ibn Battuta described him as "a miserly king from whom no great donation is to be expected." The end of Sulayman's reign has been considered the beginning of the decline of the Mali Empire.

Ibn Battuta's visit to the Mali Empire during Sulayman's reign, recorded by Ibn Juzayy in the Tuhfat an-Nuzzar, is one of the most valued primary sources for understanding the Mali Empire at its height, though doubts have been raised about its reliability as a firsthand account. The historian Al-Umari also wrote his account of the Mali Empire during Sulayman's reign.

Leo Africanus incorrectly attributed the founding of Timbuktu to Mansa Sulayman; he may have conflated Sulayman with his brother Musa, whose reign is associated with some building projects in Timbuktu, which had already existed for some time before being incorporated into the Mali Empire.

Niane identified Sulayman with Mansa Sama, a descendant of Sunjata said in oral tradition to have built the Kamabolon, a shrine in Kangaba. Niane suggested that Sulayman built the Kamabolon after going on the hajj. However, Sulayman is not mentioned in Ibn Khaldun's list of mansas of Mali who went on the hajj, nor does Ibn Battuta mention Sulayman as having done so. Mansa Sama is likely to have been a local ruler of Kangaba who lived some time after the fall of the Mali Empire.

== Footnotes ==
Preceded by Maghan	Mansa of the Mali Empire; 1341–1360	Succeeded by Kassa
