= Moussa Sinko Coulibaly =

Malian politician

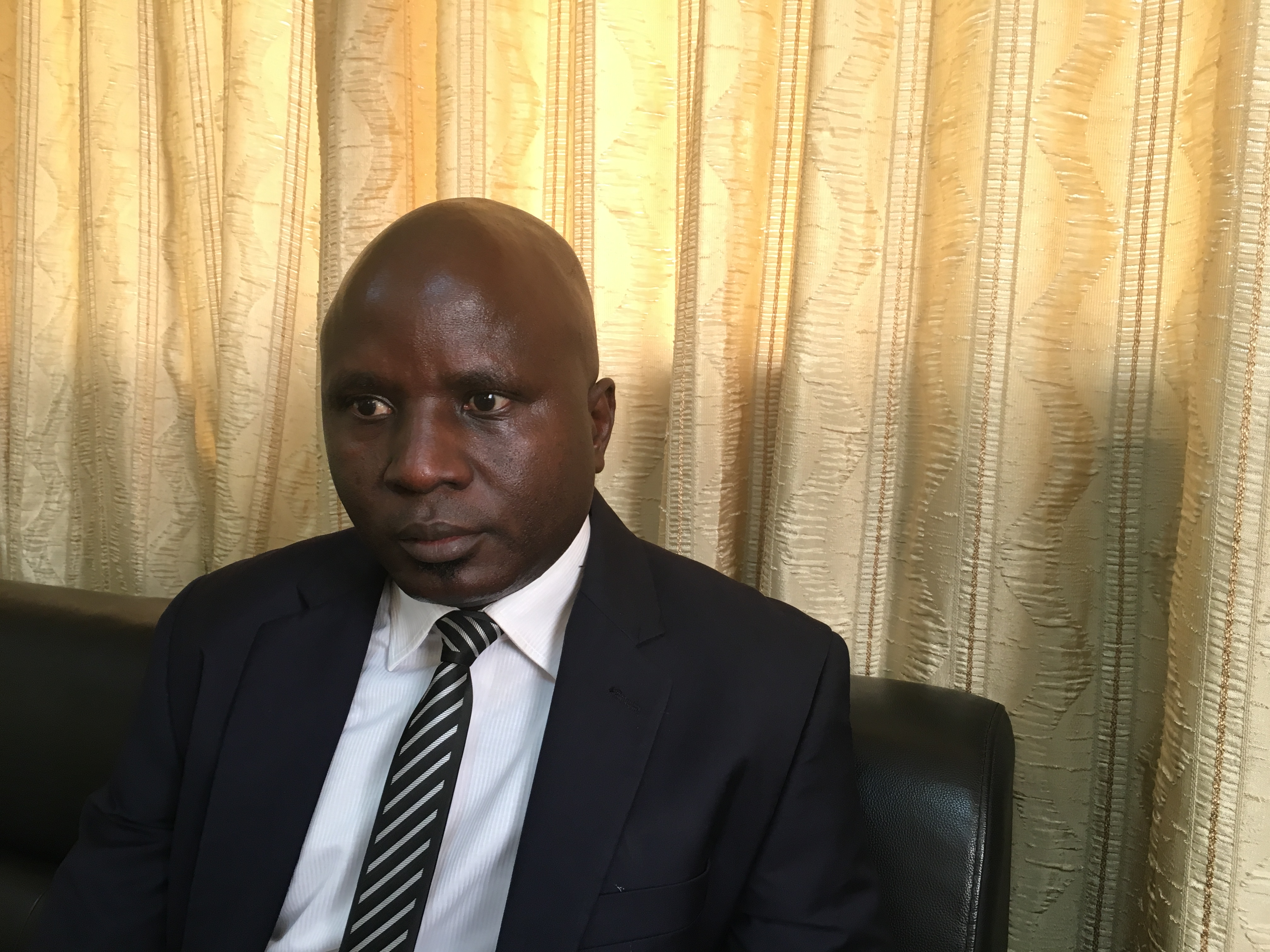
Coulibaly in 2017

Colonel Moussa Sinko Coulibaly is the Minister of Territorial Administration, of Decentralization and of Territorial Planning of Mali since 24 April 2012.
