= Ascofare Oulematou Tamboura =

Malian politician

Ascofare Oulematou Tambura is the sixth Vice-President of Mali's National Assembly, and a member of the Pan-African Parliament representing that country.
