= Maghan I =

King of the Malian Empire

Mansa of Mali
- Reign: 1337–1341
- Predecessor: Musa I
- Successor: Sulayman
- Dynasty: Keita
- Religion: Islam

Maghan I (1280s – 1341), also known as Magha or, in oral traditions, Maghan Soma Burema Kein was the tenth mansa of the Mali Empire, following his father Kankan Musa I's death in 1337.

He was left in charge of the empire, at least nominally, during his father's absence for his famous hajj. He reigned in his own right for only four years before being succeeded by his uncle Suleyman in 1341. He died of a heart attack.

== See also ==
- Keita Dynasty

Preceded by Kankan Musa I	Mansa of the Mali Empire; 1337–1341	Succeeded by Suleyman
