= Lists of actors =

The following are lists of actors (including male actors and sometimes also actresses). See also lists of actresses.

Note: These lists generally use multi-level keyword sorting. For example, "List of former Filipino child actors" is sorted as "Filipino : child actors : former". Also, "lists" articles are sorted above the "list" articles they include.

== Genre, character, work, collaboration, etc. ==
- List of action film actors
- List of actors who have played animated characters
- List of Broadway musicals stars
- List of Carry On films cast members
- List of Critical Role cast members
- List of actors who have played Dracula
- List of actors who have played Elvis Presley
- Cultural depictions of Elvis Presley
- List of Fast & Furious cast members
- List of Gargoyles cast members
- List of actors who have played Hercule Poirot
- The Hitchhiker's Guide to the Galaxy cast lists
- List of The Hunger Games characters
- List of actors who have played Jesus
- John Ford Stock Company
- List of actors who have played Mrs. Hudson
- List of cast members of the A Nightmare on Elm Street film series
- List of Pirates of the Caribbean film actors
- List of Planet of the Apes film actors
- List of Pokémon voice actors
- List of Police Academy cast members
- List of actors who have played the president of the Philippines
- List of actors who played President of the United States
- List of actors who frequently worked with Preston Sturges
- List of Royal National Theatre Company actors
- List of actors in Royal Shakespeare Company productions
- List of actors who have played Santa Claus
- List of Scream (film series) cast members
- List of Smosh cast members
- List of Spaghetti Western filmmakers § Actors
- List of recurring cast members in Stanley Kubrick films
- List of St Trinian's films cast members
- List of Thomas & Friends voice actors
- List of supporting actors in Three Stooges films
- List of Transformers film series cast and characters
- List of The Twilight Saga cast members
- List of actors who have played Van Helsing

=== Cinematic universes ===
==== Chronicles of Narnia ====
- List of The Chronicles of Narnia (film series) cast members

==== DC Extended Universe ====
- List of actors who have played Batman
- List of Batman films cast members
- List of actors who have played Wonder Woman

==== Doctor Who ====
- List of actors considered for the part of the Doctor
- List of actors who have played the Doctor

==== Harry Potter ====
- List of Harry Potter cast members
- Lists of Wizarding World cast members
- List of Wizarding World cast members

==== James Bond ====
- Bond girl § List of Bond girls
- List of actors considered for the James Bond character
- List of recurring actors in the James Bond film series

==== Marvel Cinematic Universe ====
- List of actors who have played Hulk
- List of Marvel Cinematic Universe film actors
- List of Marvel Cinematic Universe film actors (The Infinity Saga)
- List of Marvel Cinematic Universe television series actors (Marvel Studios)
- List of Marvel Cinematic Universe television series actors (Marvel Television)
- List of actors who have played Spider-Man
- List of Spider-Man film cast members
- List of actors who have played Superman
- List of X-Men film series cast members

==== Sherlock Holmes ====
- List of actors who have played Mycroft Holmes
- List of actors who have played Sherlock Holmes
- List of actors who have played Inspector Lestrade
- List of actors who have played Professor Moriarty
- List of actors who have played Dr. Watson

==== Star Wars ====
- List of Star Wars film actors
- List of Star Wars television series actors
- List of Star Wars video game actors

=== Pornography ===
- List of British pornographic actors
- List of mainstream actors who have appeared in pornographic films
- List of male actors in gay pornographic films
- List of members of the AVN Hall of Fame
- List of members of the XRCO Hall of Fame
- List of pornographic film actors who appeared in mainstream films

== Nationality ==
- List of Albanian actors
- List of current American child actors
- List of former American child actors
- List of Angolan actors
- List of Armenian actors
- List of Australian child actors
- List of Australian film actors
- List of Austrian film actors
- List of Azerbaijani actors
- List of Beninese actors
- List of Bhutanese actors
- List of Botswana actors
- List of Brazilian actors
- List of British actors
- List of current British child actors
- List of former British child actors
- List of British pornographic film actors
- List of Bulgarian actors
- List of Burkinabe actors
- List of Burmese actors
- List of Burundian actors
- List of Cambodian film actors
- List of Cameroonian actors
- List of Canadian actors
- List of Canadian child actors
- List of Canadian voice actors
- List of Chilean actors
- List of Chinese actors
- List of Chinese child actors
- List of Croatian actors
- List of Czech male actors
- List of Danish actors
- List of Dutch child actors
- List of Estonian actors
- List of current Filipino child actors
- List of former Filipino child actors
- List of Filipino male actors
- List of French actors
- List of French child actors
- List of German actors
- List of German child actors
- List of Ghanaian actors
- List of Greek actors
- List of Hungarian actors
- List of Indian child actors
- List of Indian male film actors
- List of singing actors in Indian cinema
- List of Indian television actors
- List of Iranian male actors
- List of Israeli actors
- List of Irish actors
- List of Irish child actors
- List of Italian actors
- List of Italian child actors
- List of Jamaican actors
- List of Japanese actors
- List of Japanese child actors
- List of Jordanian actors
- List of Lithuanian actors
- List of Luxembourg film actors
- List of Malaysian actors
- List of Malian actors
- List of Mexican actors
- List of Mexican voice actors
- List of Moldovan actors
- List of Nepalese actors
- List of New Zealand actors
- List of New Zealand child actors
- List of Nigerian actors
- List of North Korean actors
- List of Norwegian actors
- List of Pakistani male actors
- List of Polish actors
- List of Portuguese film actors
- List of Romanian actors
- List of Rwandan actors
- List of Senegalese actors
- List of Serbian actors
- List of Slovenian actors
- List of South African actors
- List of South Korean male actors
- List of South Sudanese actors
- List of Spanish actors
- List of Spanish child actors
- List of Sri Lankan actors
- List of Sudanese actors
- List of Swedish actors
- List of Swedish child actors
- List of Tanzanian actors
- List of Thai male actors
- List of Turkish actors
- List of Ugandan actors
- List of actors from Ukraine
- List of Uzbekistani film actors
- List of Vietnamese actors

== Ethnicity, religion, language, state, etc. ==
- List of Hispanics and Latinos in film
- List of Jewish actors
- Canada:
  - List of Indigenous Canadian actors
  - List of Quebec actors
- France:
  - Sociétaires of the Comédie-Française
- India:
  - List of Bhojpuri actors
  - List of Chhattisgarhi film actors
  - List of Hindi film actors
  - List of Hindi television actors
  - List of Malayalam film actors
  - List of Marathi film actors
  - List of Marathi television actors
  - List of Marathi theatre actors
  - List of Punjabi cinema actors
  - List of Tamil film actors
  - List of actors of Tamil origin
- Nigeria:
  - List of Kannywood actors
  - List of Nigerian Yoruba actors
- United Kingdom of Great Britain and Northern Ireland:
  - List of English actors
  - List of Scottish actors
- United States of America:
  - List of African-American actors
  - List of former African-American child actors
  - List of Hispanic and Latino American actors
  - List of Italian-American actors
  - List of American actors of Irish descent
  - List of Michigan actors
  - List of Native American actors

== Achievements ==
- List of actors nominated for Academy Awards for non-English performances
- List of actors with more than one Academy Award nomination in the acting categories
- List of actors nominated for multiple Academy Awards in the same year
- List of actors with Academy Award nominations
- List of actors with two or more Academy Awards in acting categories
- AFI's 100 Years...100 Stars
- EGOT
- List of highest-grossing actors
- List of highest-paid film actors
- List of actors with Hollywood Walk of Fame motion picture stars
- List of stars on the Hollywood Walk of Fame
- List of longest-serving soap opera actors
- List of actors who have appeared in multiple Palme d'Or winners
- List of actors with two or more Star Awards in acting categories
- Radio Times's Most Powerful People
- Top Ten Money Making Stars Poll
- WAMPAS Baby Stars

== Other ==
- List of animal actors
- Lists of child actors
- List of fictional actors
- List of actors who have played multiple roles in the same film
- List of actor-politicians
- List of television performers who died during production
- List of voice actors

== See also ==
- List of entertainers who performed in blackface
- List of centenarians (actors, filmmakers and entertainers)
- List of semi-supercentenarians (actors, filmmakers and entertainers)
- List of supercentenarians (actors, filmmakers and entertainers)
- List of documentary films
- List of film and television directors
- List of film director and actor collaborations
- List of film production companies
- Lists of films
- Lists of people by occupation
- List of stage names
- List of television programs in which one character was played by multiple actors
