= List of Burkinabe actors =

This is a list of actors and actresses from, or connected to, Burkina Faso. This list also includes people of Burkinabé descent. The list is arranged alphabetically by surname.

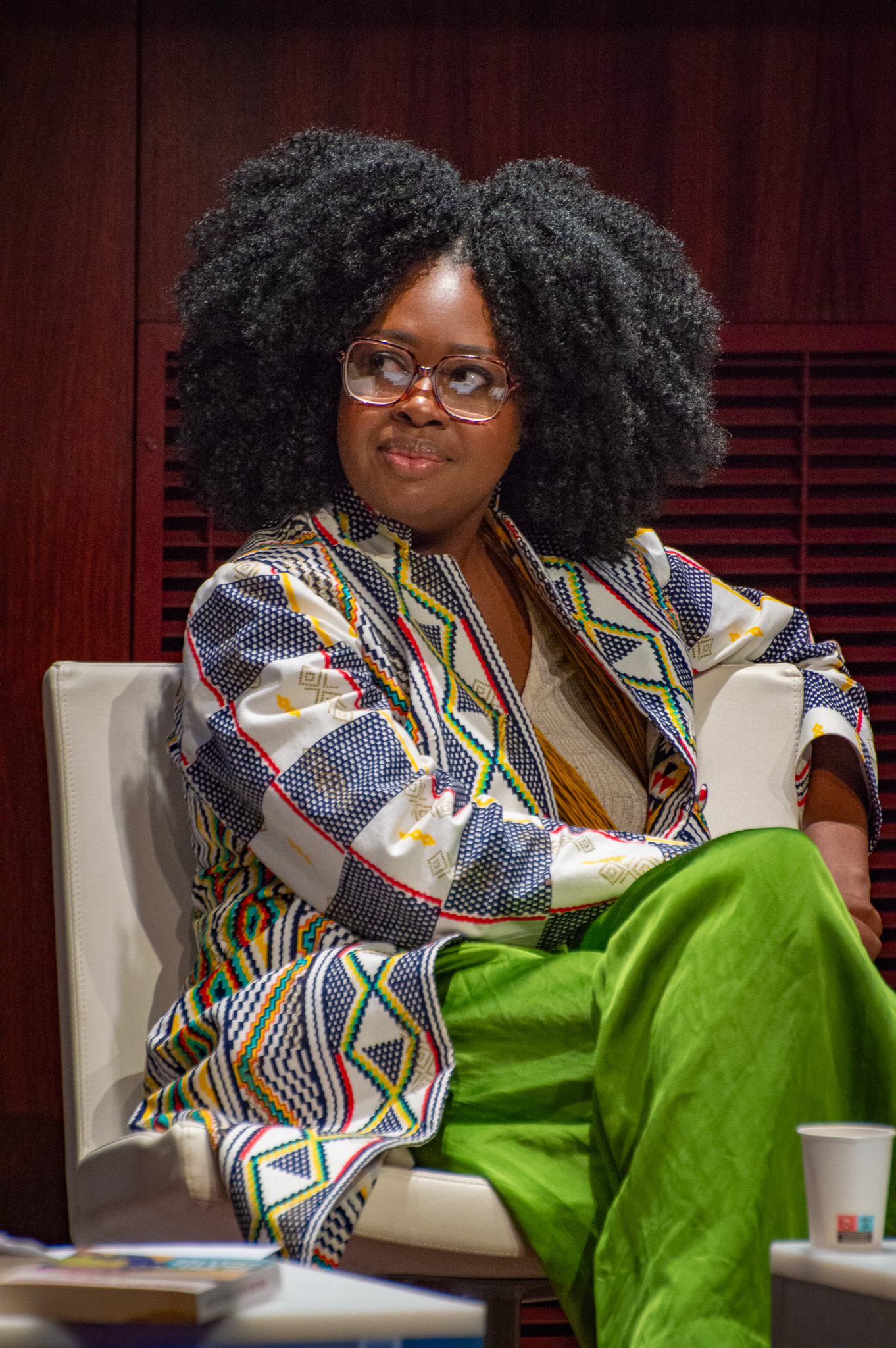
Roukiata Ouedraogo, 2023

== B ==
- Serge Bambara (born 1971)
- Seydou Boro (born 1968)

== I ==
- Jacky Ido (born 1977)

== K ==
- Aï Keïta (born 1957)
- Sotigui Kouyaté (1936–2010)

== N ==
- Philomène Nanéma (born 1982)

== O ==
- Delphine Ouattara (born 1967)
- Roukiata Ouedraogo (born 1979)

== S ==
- Odile Sankara
- Isaka Sawadogo (born 1966)
- Koudous Seihon (born 1986)
- Théophile Sowié (1960-2021)

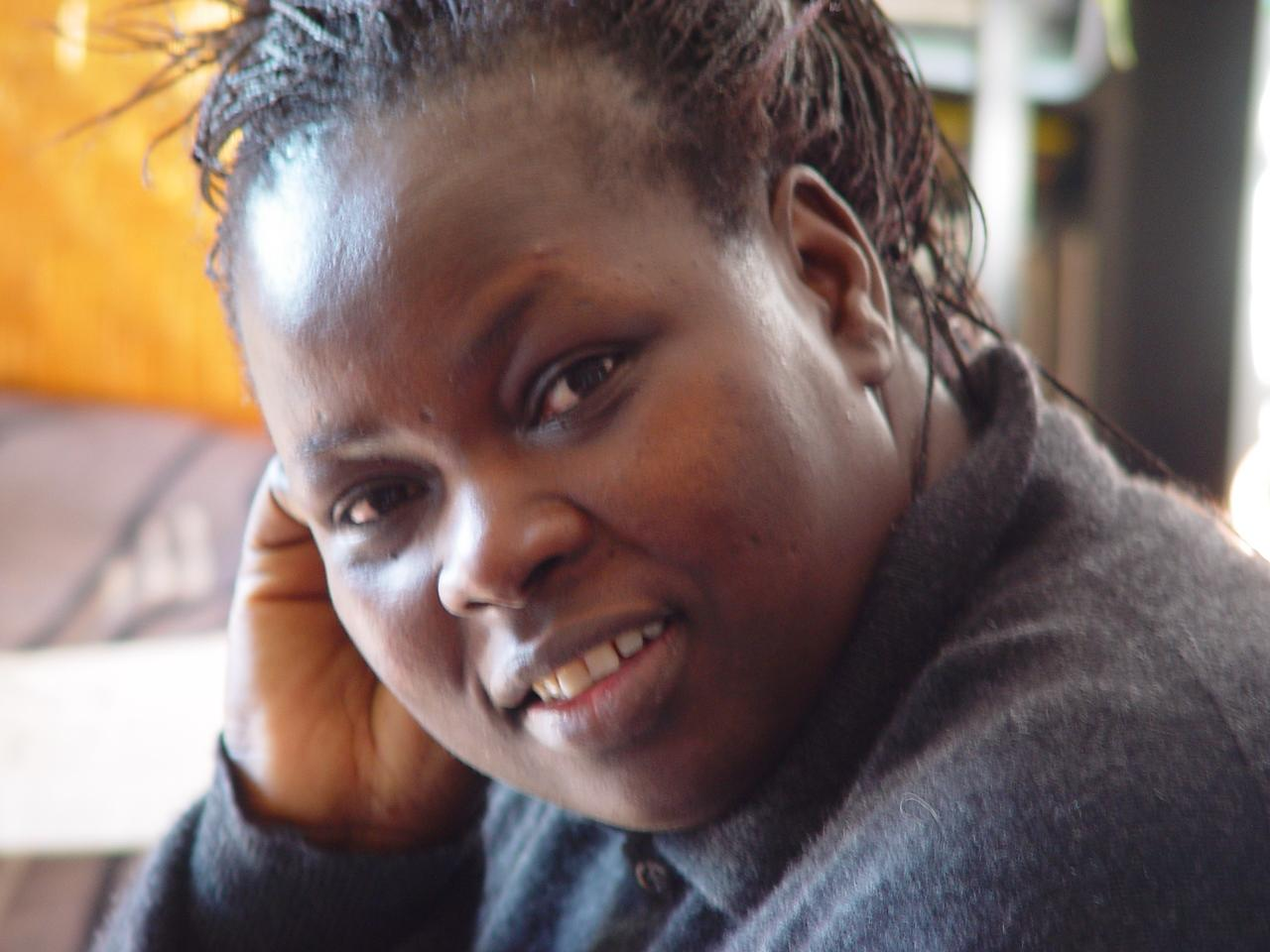
Irène Tassembédo

== T ==
- Irène Tassembédo (born 1957)
- Kady Traoré (born 1979)

== Y ==
- Blandine Yaméogo (born 1960)

== See also ==
- List of Burkinabes
- Cinema of Burkina Faso
