= List of Spanish actors =

This is a list of Spanish actors.

== A ==
- Encarna Abad (1927)
- Victoria Abril (1959)
- Emilio Aragón Álvarez (1959)
- Elena Anaya (1975)
- Aron Piper (1997)

== B ==
- Antonio Banderas (1960)
- Javier Bardem (1969)
- Jaime Blanch (1940)
- Carmen Bonaplata (1871–1911), operatic soprano
- Juan Diego Botto (1975)
- Celso Bugallo (1947)

== C ==
- Armando Calvo (1919–1996)
- Toni Cantó (1965)
- Mario Casas (1986)
- Estrellita Castro (1908–1983)
- Oona Chaplin (1986)
- Mark Consuelos (1970)
- Jan Cornet (1982)
- Penélope Cruz (1974)

== E ==
- Luis Escobar (1908–1991)
- Manolo Escobar (1931–2013)
- Ester Expósito (2000)

== F ==
- Angelines Fernández (1922–1994)
- Fernando Fernán-Gómez (1921–2007)
- Alba Flores (1986)

== G ==
- Sancho Gracia (1936–2012)

== K ==
- Dafne Keen (2005)

== L ==
- Alfredo Landa (1933–2013)
- Sergi López (1965)

== M ==
- Carmen Maura (1945)
- Jesús Mosquera (1993)
- Jordi Mollá (1968)
- Kuya Manzano (1977)
- Sara Montiel (1928–2013)
- Amparo Muñoz (1954–2011)

== N ==
- Paul Naschy (1934–2009)
- Conchita Núñez (1943–2009)

== P ==
- Marisa Paredes (1946)
- Elsa Pataky (1976)
- Danna Paola (1995)

== R ==
- Francisco Rabal (1926–2001)
- Fernando Rey (1917–1994)
- Álvaro Rico (1996)

== S ==
- Aitana Sánchez-Gijón (1968)
- Fernando Sancho (1916–1990)
- Ines Sastre (1973)
- Ariadna Sintes (1986)

== V ==
- Paz Vega (1976)
- Maribel Verdú (1970)

== See also ==
- List of Spaniards
