= List of Moldovan actors =

This is a list of Moldovan actors.

== A ==
- Beno Axionov

== C ==
- Constantin Cheianu
- Nina Crulicovschi

== G ==
- Grigore Grigoriu

== H ==
- Petru Hadârcă
- Alexandrina Hristov

== J ==
- Valeriu Jereghi

== L ==
- Irina Lachina

== R ==
- Sofia Rotaru

== T ==
- Mihai Timofti
- Valentin Todercan
- Svetlana Toma

== U ==
- Ion Ungureanu
- Gheorghe Urschi

== V ==
- Andrei Vartic
- Mihai Volontir

== See also ==
- List of Moldovans
