= List of Michigan actors =

Following is a list of major or supporting actors from Michigan:

== A–E ==
- Tim Allen, actor known for sitcom Home Improvement and Disney films such as The Santa Clause and Toy Story (born in Denver, raised in Birmingham)
- Maureen Anderman, actress (born in Detroit)
- Gillian Anderson, actress known for television series The X-Files and Hannibal (born in Chicago, moved to Grand Rapids)
- Curtis Armstrong, actor known for Revenge of the Nerds films, TV series Moonlighting (born in Detroit; raised in Berkley)
- Robert Armstrong, remembered for quote "'Twas beauty killed the beast" at end of King Kong (1933) (born in Saginaw)
- Stephanie Bachelor, actress in films like Secrets of Scotland Yard and Lake Placid Serenade (born in Detroit)
- Kirk Baily, actor known for Salute Your Shorts (raised in Adrian)
- Justin Bartha, actor known for films National Treasure and Gigli (raised in West Bloomfield)
- Bob Bell, television's Bozo the Clown (born in Flint)
- Kristen Bell, actress known for title role in TV series Veronica Mars and films like Forgetting Sarah Marshall and Frozen (born in Huntington Woods)
- Elizabeth Berkley, television (Saved by the Bell) and film actress (born in Farmington Hills)
- Big Sean (Sean Anderson), rapper (born in California, raised in Detroit)
- Selma Blair, television (Anger Management) and film actress (born in Southfield)
- Cheryl Blaylock, puppeteer known for title role on Nickelodeon's Eureeka's Castle (born and raised in Kalamazoo)
- Mary Boland, actress known for films like The Women and Pride and Prejudice (born in Philadelphia, Pennsylvania)
- Sonny Bono, actor, singer, songwriter and politician, known for Sonny and Cher music and TV series (born in Detroit)
- Daniel Booko, actor (born in Three Rivers)
- Megan Boone, actress known for TV series The Blacklist (born in Petoskey)
- Lynn Borden, actress on Hazel and the film Frogs; Miss Arizona in 1957 (born in Detroit)
- Willis Bouchey, actor (born in Vernon)
- Betsy Brandt, actress, Marie Schrader on Breaking Bad (born in Bay City)
- Christie Brinkley, model and actress (born in Monroe)
- Olivia Brown, actress (born in Frankfurt, West Germany and raised in Livonia, Michigan)
- Sophina Brown, actress, known as Nikki Betancourt on Numb3rs and Raina Troy on Shark (born in Saginaw)
- Ellen Burstyn, actress, Academy Award winner and four-time nominee, known for The Exorcist, also Tony Award winner (born in Detroit)
- David Burtka, stage and television actor (born in Livonia, raised in Canton)
- Tony Burton, actor, "Duke" Evers from Rocky films (born in Flint)
- Timothy Busfield, director and Emmy Award-winning actor, known for films (Field of Dreams) and the television series thirtysomething and The West Wing (born in East Lansing)
- James Caan, actor known for The Godfather and other films (attended Michigan State University)
- Dean Cain, actor known for playing Superman on TV series Lois & Clark (born in Mount Clemens)
- James Callahan, actor, Charles in Charge (born in Grand Rapids)
- Bruce Campbell, actor, writer known for The Evil Dead film series, and Hercules, Xena: Warrior Princess and Burn Notice television series (born in Royal Oak; raised in Birmingham)
- Larry Joe Campbell, actor known for role as "Andy" on ABC sitcom According to Jim (born in Cadillac)
- Mandalynn Carlson, actress known for film Machine Gun Preacher (born in Detroit and raised in Taylor)
- Horace B. Carpenter, actor of silent films (born in Grand Rapids)
- Sharon Case, actress known for The Young and the Restless (born in Detroit)
- Seymour Cassel, actor known for many John Cassavetes films (born in Detroit)
- Jessica Cauffiel, actress, known as Margot in film Legally Blonde and its sequel (born in Detroit)
- Riley Chamberlin, actor of silent films (born in Grand Rapids)
- Rex Cherryman, actor of silent films (born in Grand Rapids)
- Scarlett Chorvat, actress (born in Slovakia; raised in Detroit)
- Carol Christensen, actress and model (born in Detroit)
- Garrett Clayton, actor, "Tanner" in Disney Channel's Teen Beach Movie and sequel (born in Dearborn)
- Dave Coulier, actor known for role as "Joey" in television series Full House (born in Detroit)
- Wally Cox, film and television actor, The Bedford Incident, Mister Peepers, voice of Underdog (born in Detroit)
- Terry Crews, actor known for films like The Expendables, football player for Green Bay Packers (born in Flint)
- Vondie Curtis-Hall, actor, director, known for role as Dr. Hancock in Chicago Hope (born in Detroit)
- Jeff Daniels, actor and musician, known for films like Terms of Endearment, Dumb and Dumber, The Martian and TV's The Newsroom (born in Athens, Georgia, raised in Michigan, resident of Chelsea)
- Cynthia Darlow, actress, played various roles on PBS's Square One TV (born in Detroit)
- Jeremy Davies, actor, known as Daniel Faraday on Lost (born in Traverse City)
- Pam Dawber, actress known as "Mindy" on ABC's Mork & Mindy, wife of Mark Harmon (born in Farmington Hills)
- Jude Demorest, actress, singer, and songwriter, known for her role as the titular character on FOX's STAR
- Johnny Desmond, actor and singer (born in Detroit)
- Ryan Destiny, actress and singer, known as Alex on FOX's STAR series
- Seamus Dever, actor known as Detective Kevin Ryan on Castle and Dr. Ian Devlin on General Hospital (born in Flint)
- Susan Diol, actress (born in Marquette)
- Doris Dowling, actress, The Lost Weekend, The Blue Dahlia (born in Detroit)
- James Duval, actor, Donnie Darko and Independence Day (born in Detroit, raised in Los Angeles)
- Colin Egglesfield, actor, known as Josh Madden on All My Children and Auggie Kirkpatrick on Melrose Place (born in Farmington Hills)
- Dana Elcar, film, stage and television actor known for The Sting and TV series MacGyver (born in Ferndale)
- Patricia Ellis, film actress of 1930s, The Case of the Lucky Legs, Elmer, the Great (born in Birmingham)
- Eminem (Marshall Mathers III), rapper and actor, star of 8 Mile (born in Saint Joseph, Missouri, raised in Warren)
- Jean Engstrom, actress (born in Detroit, raised in Augusta and Battle Creek)
- Venida Evans, actress (born in Ypsilanti; raised in Detroit)
- Chad Everett, actor, star of TV series Medical Center and films such as The Singing Nun, Airplane II: The Sequel and Psycho (born in South Bend, Indiana, raised in Dearborn)

== F–K ==
- Jack Falahee, actor, Connor Walsh on How to Get Away with Murder (born in Ann Arbor)
- Paul Feig, actor, writer, and director, Mr. Pool on Sabrina, the Teenage Witch (born in Royal Oak)
- Sherilyn Fenn, actress known as Audrey Horne on the television series Twin Peaks and for such films as Boxing Helena (born in Detroit)
- Audrey Ferris, actress from silent-film era (born in Detroit)
- Dann Florek, actor known as Captain Donald Cragen on Law & Order and Law & Order: Special Victims Unit (born in Flat Rock)
- Nicole Forester, actress, Cassie Winslow on Guiding Light (born in Ann Arbor)
- Sutton Foster, Tony Award-winning stage actress (raised in Troy)
- Max Gail, actor known as Detective Wojciehowicz on Barney Miller (born in Detroit, raised in Grosse Ile)
- Jennifer Gan, stage and film actress (born in Detroit)
- Christopher George, actor, Sgt. Sam Troy on The Rat Patrol, films like El Dorado and Grizzly (born in Royal Oak)
- Matthew Glave, actor, known as Dr. Dale Edson in ER (born in Saginaw)
- Reagan Gomez-Preston, actress, Zaria Peterson on The Parent 'Hood and voice of Roberta Tubbs on The Cleveland Show (born in Detroit)
- Faye Grant, actress, State of Grace, The Greatest American Hero, and V: The Series (born in St. Clair Shores)
- Judy Greer, actress, Kitty Sanchez on Arrested Development and voice of Cheryl on Archer (born in Livonia)
- David Alan Grier, comedian and actor known for In Living Color and films like Jumanji, McHale's Navy and Boomerang (born in Flint)
- Nick Griffin, comedian and writer (from Detroit)
- Norman H. Hackett, Canadian-born stage actor, raised and died in Detroit
- Stacy Haiduk, actress, Lana Lang on Superboy television series (born in Grand Rapids)
- Elisabeth Harnois, actress, Morgan Brody on CSI: Crime Scene Investigation and Alice on Adventures in Wonderland (born in Detroit)
- Julie Harris, actress, recipient of more Tony Award nominations (ten) and wins (five) than any other performer, Academy Award nominee (born in Grosse Pointe Park)
- Don Harvey, actor in films like Casualties of War and Eight Men Out (born in St. Clair Shores)
- Daniel Henney, actor, Agent Zero in X-Men Origins: Wolverine (born in Carson City)
- Jeff Hephner, actor, Matt Ramsey on The O.C. (born in Sand Creek)
- Edward Herrmann, Emmy Award-winning actor, known for films and as Richard Gilmore on Gilmore Girls (raised in Grosse Pointe)
- Charlton Heston, Oscar-winning actor known for films such as The Ten Commandments and Ben-Hur (raised in St. Helen)
- Gil Hill, actor and former police officer known for role in Beverly Hills Cop films (lived in Detroit)
- Verna Hillie, actress, co-star of John Wayne westerns (born in Hancock)
- John Hodiak, actor, known for films like Lifeboat and The Bribe (born in Pittsburgh, raised in Hamtramck)
- Phillips Holmes, actor, known for films like The Criminal Code and Great Expectations (born in Grand Rapids)
- Telma Hopkins, singer and actress in sitcom roles on Bosom Buddies, Gimme a Break!, and Half & Half (raised in Highland Park)
- Ernie Hudson, actor known for his role in Ghostbusters (born in Benton Harbor)
- Tom Hulce, actor, Academy Award for Best Actor nominee for Amadeus, Tony Award nominee for play A Few Good Men (born in Detroit - although some sources cite his birthplace as Whitewater, Wisconsin - raised in Plymouth)
- Kim Hunter, actress, Academy Award for Best Supporting Actress winner for the film A Streetcar Named Desire (born in Detroit)
- Betty Hutton, actress and singer who starred in Annie Get Your Gun and Oscar-winning film The Greatest Show on Earth (born in Battle Creek)
- Marion Hutton, actress and singer, sister of Betty Hutton (born in Arkansas, raised in Battle Creek)
- Laura Innes, television director and actress on ER television series (born in Pontiac)
- Brandon T. Jackson, actor and stand-up comedian, Alpa Chino in Tropic Thunder (born in Detroit and raised in West Bloomfield)
- Brian d'Arcy James, Broadway actor and musician, featured in NBC series Smash (born in Saginaw)
- Ken Jeong, actor and comedian, Leslie Chow in The Hangover and Ben in TV series Community (born in Detroit)
- Arte Johnson, actor and comedian, Rowan & Martin's Laugh-In (born in Benton Harbor)
- James Earl Jones, actor known for films such as The Great White Hope and Field of Dreams plus his voice roles of Darth Vader in the Star Wars film series and Mufasa in The Lion King (born in Mississippi); raised from age five in Norman Township
- John Marshall Jones, actor, Floyd Henderson on Smart Guy and Mr. Stockley on The Troop (born in Detroit)
- Walter Jones, actor, Zack Taylor, original Black Ranger from Mighty Morphin Power Rangers (born in Detroit)
- Ella Joyce, stage actress (born in Chicago, Illinois; raised in Detroit)
- Matt Keeslar, actor, star of ABC Family's The Middleman (born in Grand Rapids)
- Brian Kelly, actor in TV series Flipper (born in Detroit)
- David Patrick Kelly, actor known for film The Warriors (born in Detroit)
- Page Kennedy, actor, known as drug dealer U-Turn on Weeds (born in Wyandotte)
- Phyllis Kennedy, actress from 1930s films such as Stage Door (born in Detroit)
- Carrie Keranen, voice actress for anime and video games (born in Oak Park)
- Keegan-Michael Key, comedic actor known for his various roles in MADtv and Key & Peele (born in Southfield and raised in Detroit)
- Richard Kiel, actor known for his role as Jaws in James Bond movies The Spy Who Loved Me and Moonraker (born in Detroit)
- James Kirkwood Sr., actor and director of silent films (born in Grand Rapids)
- Martin Klebba, actor/stuntman, Marty in Pirates of the Caribbean films and in reality show Little People, Big World (born in Troy)
- Nancy Kovack, actress in many films and TV series, wife of conductor Zubin Mehta (born in Flint)
- Eric Allan Kramer, actor, Dave Rogers on The Hughleys and Bob Duncan on Good Luck Charlie (born in Grand Rapids)
- Jana Kramer, actress, Alex Dupre on One Tree Hill (born in Detroit)

== L–R ==
- Christine Lahti, Golden Globe- and Emmy Award-winning actress known as Dr. Kate Austin on Chicago Hope (born in Birmingham)
- Piper Laurie, actress, known for The Hustler, two-time Academy Award for Best Supporting Actress nominee for Carrie and Children of a Lesser God (born in Detroit)
- Taylor Lautner, actor, known as Jacob Black in The Twilight Saga (born in Grand Rapids)
- Linda Lawson, actress, featured in Night Tide and many television roles (born in Ann Arbor)
- Joan Leslie, actress, featured in High Sierra and Yankee Doodle Dandy (born in Detroit)
- Matt Letscher, actor, Gavin Stone on Good Morning, Miami (born in Grosse Pointe)
- Matthew Lillard, actor, known for Scream and The Descendants, voice of Shaggy from Scooby-Doo TV series (born in Lansing)
- William Lucking, actor, Piney in Sons of Anarchy (born in Vicksburg)
- June MacCloy, actress, known for films like Good Morning, Eve! and Go West (born in Sturgis)
- Marguerite MacIntyre, actress, Nicole Trager on Kyle XY (born in Detroit)
- Madonna (Ciccone), singer and actress, member of Rock and Roll Hall of Fame (born in Bay City, raised in Pontiac and Avon Township)
- Lee Majors, actor known as title character in TV series The Six Million Dollar Man (born in Wyandotte)
- Adele Mara, actress known for films like Sands of Iwo Jima and Wake of the Red Witch (born in Highland Park)
- Dick Martin, comedian, actor and co-host of Rowan & Martin's Laugh-In (born in Battle Creek)
- Vivian Martin, actress of silent films (born in Sparta)
- Tim McCoy, actor of Western films (born in Saginaw)
- Ruth McDevitt, actress of Pistols 'n' Petticoats (born in Coldwater)
- Lonette McKee, actress, known as Maggie Davis on Third Watch and for films like Sparkle and The Cotton Club (born in Detroit)
- Tim Meadows, comedian, actor, Saturday Night Live cast member (born in Highland Park)
- S. Epatha Merkerson, Emmy Award-winning actress known as Lt. Anita Van Buren in Law & Order (born in Saginaw)
- Nicki Micheaux, actress, Jenn Sutton in Lincoln Heights (born in Detroit)
- Martin Milner, actor, known as Officer Pete Malloy on Adam-12 and Tod Stiles on Route 66 (born in Detroit)
- Guy Mitchell, actor, known for such films as Those Redheads from Seattle and Red Garters (born in Detroit)
- Colleen Moore, silent-movie-era actress (born in Port Huron)
- Kenya Moore, actress, Miss USA 1993, cast member on The Real Housewives of Atlanta (born in Detroit)
- Harry Morgan, actor known for many films and as Colonel Sherman T. Potter in TV series M*A*S*H (born in Muskegon)
- Michael Moriarty, Emmy Award-winning actor known for films like Pale Rider and Bang the Drum Slowly and as Exec. A.D.A. Ben Stone on Law & Order (born in Detroit)
- Kevin Nash, professional wrestler, actor in films John Wick and Magic Mike (born in Detroit)
- Marilyn Nash, actress, starred with Charlie Chaplin in film Monsieur Verdoux (born in Flint)
- Jaime Ray Newman, actress, Kristina Cassadine on General Hospital and Kat Gardener on Eastwick (born in Farmington Hills)
- Denise Nicholas, actress known for TV series Room 222 (born in Detroit, raised in Milan)
- Austin Nichols, actor, Julian Baker on One Tree Hill and Spencer Monroe on The Walking Dead (born in Ann Arbor)
- Taylor Nichols, actor, Doug Nelson on The Mind of the Married Man and Mark in Jurassic Park III (born in Lansing)
- Gail O'Grady, actress, Donna Abandando on NYPD Blue and Helen Pryor on American Dreams (born in Detroit)
- Terry O'Quinn, actor, known as John Locke on Lost (born in Sault Sainte Marie)
- Colleen O'Shaughnessey, voice actor, "Sora" from Digimon and "Jazz Fenton" from Danny Phantom (born in Grand Rapids, raised in Troy)
- Carter Oosterhouse, regular on TLC's Trading Spaces (born in Traverse City)
- Julie Parrish, actress, The Nutty Professor, Paradise, Hawaiian Style (born in Kentucky, raised in Tecumseh)
- Virginia Patton, actress, It's a Wonderful Life (born in Cleveland, Ohio; lives in Ann Arbor)
- George Peppard, actor known for TV series The A-Team and Banacek and films such as Breakfast at Tiffany's and How the West Was Won (born in Detroit, raised in Dearborn)
- Kathleen Rose Perkins, actress, Carol Rance on Episodes (born in New Baltimore)
- Lauri Peters, actress, known for Tony-nominated Broadway role in The Sound of Music and film Mr. Hobbs Takes a Vacation (born in Detroit)
- Rick Peters, actor, Bobby Manning on Sue Thomas: F.B.Eye (born in Detroit)
- Britta Phillips, film, TV and voice actor, title character of Jem
- Jeff Pillars, actor (born in Kalamazoo)
- Susan May Pratt, actress (born in East Lansing)
- Phyllis Povah, actress, The Women, Pat and Mike (born in Detroit)
- Richard Quine, actor and director, Bell, Book and Candle and How to Murder Your Wife (born in Detroit)
- Gilda Radner, actress and original cast member of Saturday Night Live (born in Detroit)
- Sam Raimi, director and actor, known for the Spider-Man trilogy (born in Royal Oak)
- Ted Raimi, actor known for roles in seaQuest DSV and Xena:Warrior Princess (born in Detroit)
- Mary Lynn Rajskub, actress, Chloe O'Brian on 24 (born in Detroit, raised in Trenton)
- David Ramsey, actor, John Diggle on Arrow and Anton Briggs on Dexter (born in Detroit)
- Joyce Randolph, actress known as "Trixie" on The Honeymooners (born in Detroit)
- Michael Raymond-James, actor, Rene Lenier on True Blood and Britt Pollack on Terriers (born in Detroit)
- Elizabeth Reaser, actress, Esme Cullen in The Twilight Saga film series and Rebecca Pope on Grey's Anatomy (born in Bloomfield)
- Crystal Reed, actress, Allison Argent in the TV series Teen Wolf (born in Detroit)
- Della Reese, actress and singer, Emmy Award-winner for TV series Touched by an Angel (born in Detroit)
- Burt Reynolds, actor and director, known for Boogie Nights, Deliverance, Smokey and the Bandit (born in Lansing)
- Gene Reynolds, actor, television writer, director, and producer (raised in Detroit)
- Jason Robards, Sr., actor (born in Hillsdale)
- Amy Roloff, mother in reality-TV series Little People, Big World
- Michelle Ruff, voice actress for anime and video games (born in Detroit)

== S–Z ==
- Ellen Sandweiss, actress (born in Detroit)
- George C. Scott, actor, director and producer, Academy Award winner for Patton (born in Wise, Virginia; raised in Detroit)
- Steven Seagal, actor known for films such as Under Siege (born in Lansing)
- Zelda Sears, screenwriter and actress (born in Brockway Township)
- Tom Selleck, actor known for the TV series Magnum, P.I. and Blue Bloods and films such as Three Men and a Baby (born in Detroit)
- Lin Shaye, actress, Magda in There's Something About Mary and Elise Reiner in the Insidious films (born in Detroit)
- Stephanie Sheh, voice actress for anime and video games (born in Kalamazoo)
- Dax Shepard, actor known for the TV series Parenthood (born in Milford)
- Grant Show, actor, Jake on TV series Melrose Place (born in Detroit)
- Douglas Sills, stage actor (born in Detroit; raised in Franklin)
- J. K. Simmons, actor, Academy Award winner for Whiplash, known as Dr. Emil Skoda in Law & Order and J. Jonah Jameson in Spider-Man films (born in Grosse Point)
- Stirling Silliphant, screenwriter and producer, wrote Oscar-winning In the Heat of the Night (born in Detroit)
- Sinbad (David Adkins), actor and comedian (born in Benton Harbor)
- Tom Sizemore, actor known for films such as Saving Private Ryan, Heat, Natural Born Killers (born in Detroit)
- Tom Skerritt, actor known for films such as M*A*S*H, Alien, The Dead Zone, Contact and TV series Picket Fences (born in Detroit)
- Michael Bailey Smith, actor, Belthazor on Charmed and Creepy in Men in Black II (born in Alpena)
- David Spade, actor, Saturday Night Live and films such as Tommy Boy and Grown Ups (born in Birmingham)
- Michael Spellman, film and television actor (born in Detroit)
- Elaine Stritch, actress with four Tony Award nominations (born in Detroit, lived and died in Birmingham)
- Geoff Stults, actor, Ben Kinkirk in 7th Heaven (born in Detroit)
- George Stults, Kevin Kinkirk in 7th Heaven (born in Detroit)
- Jackie Swanson, actress, Kelly Gaines on Cheers (born in Grand Rapids)
- William Talman, actor known for his role as D.A. Hamilton Burger on TV series Perry Mason (born in Detroit)
- Barbara Tarbuck, actress known as Lady Jane Jacks on General Hospital (born in Detroit)
- Leigh Taylor-Young, actress, Elaine Stevens on Sunset Beach, Rachel Welles on Peyton Place, and Kimberly Cryder on Dallas (born in Washington, D.C., raised in Oakland County)
- Ruth Taylor, actress from silent-film era, mother of Buck Henry (born in Grand Rapids)
- Ray Teal, actor, sheriff on Bonanza; appeared in 250 movies and 90 television shows (born in Grand Rapids)
- Ruth Terry, actress and singer featured in Hollywood films of 1940s (born in Benton Harbor)
- Danny Thomas, actor, singer and comedian, known for TV series Make Room for Daddy (born in Deerfield and moved to Detroit)
- Marlo Thomas, actress, known for TV series That Girl (born in Detroit)
- Hilary Thompson, actress (born in Birmingham)
- Michael Tolan, actor (born in Detroit)
- James Tolkan, actor in films such as Back to the Future and Top Gun (born in Calumet)
- Lily Tomlin, actress and comedian, Tony Award winner for The Search for Signs of Intelligent Life in the Universe and an Academy Award for Best Supporting Actress nominee for film Nashville (born in Detroit)
- Verne Troyer, actor known for playing Mini-Me in the Austin Powers film series (born in Sturgis, raised in Centreville)
- Toni Trucks, actor, NCIS: New Orleans (born in Grand Rapids, raised in Manistee)
- Tom Tyler, actor, films such as Stagecoach, Adventures of Captain Marvel, The Phantom (lived and died in Hamtramck)
- Courtney B. Vance, Emmy and Tony-winning actor known as Ron Carver on NBC's Law & Order: Criminal Intent and as Johnnie Cochran on The People v O.J. Simpson (born in Detroit)
- Harvey Vernon, actor, Jasper DeWitt in the television series Carter Country (born in Flint)
- Martha Vickers, actress in films such as The Big Sleep, Alimony, Ruthless (born in Ann Arbor)
- Robert Wagner, actor known for TV series Hart to Hart and It Takes a Thief and films including The Pink Panther, The Towering Inferno and the Austin Powers trilogy (born in Detroit)
- Katherine Warren, actress, The Caine Mutiny, Jailhouse Rock (born in Detroit)
- Don Was, music producer and musician known for his work with Bob Dylan and a host of other veteran artists
- Cynthia Watros, actress, Libby Smith on Lost, Kellie Newmark on The Drew Carey Show, Erin Fitzpatrick on Titus, and Annie Dutton on Guiding Light (born in Lake Orion)
- Barry Watson, actor, Matt Camden on 7th Heaven and Todd on Samantha Who? (born in Traverse City)
- David Wayne, actor in films like Adam's Rib and The Andromeda Strain and "Mad Hatter" on 1960s television series Batman (born in Traverse City, raised in Bloomingdale)
- Veronica Webb, model, actress and television personality (born in Detroit)
- Tom Welling, actor known as Clark Kent on the television series Smallville (born in Putnam Valley, New York; raised in Okemos)
- Billy West, cartoon voice-over actor, Stimpy in Ren and Stimpy (born in Detroit)
- Barbara Whiting, actress in such films as Fresh from Paris, City Across the River (born in Detroit)
- Grace Lee Whitney, actress, Yeoman Janice Rand on Star Trek: The Original Series (born in Ann Arbor)
- Robin Williams, actor, Academy Award for Best Supporting Actor winner for Good Will Hunting and star of TV series Mork & Mindy (born in Chicago, Illinois; raised in Bloomfield Hills)
- Blair Wingo, model, actress, and Christian spoken word artist (born in Grand Rapids)
- John Witherspoon, actor, Pops on The Wayans Bros. and voice of Granddad on The Boondocks (born in Detroit)
- James Wolk, actor, Zach Cropper on The Crazy Ones and Bob Benson on Mad Men (born in Farmington Hills)
- Max Wright, actor, known as father on ALF (born in Detroit)
- H.M. Wynant, actor (born in Detroit)
- Steven Yeun, actor, Glenn on The Walking Dead (raised in Troy)
- Dick York, actor known for films like Inherit the Wind and as original Darrin Stephens in television's Bewitched (lived in Rockford)
- Dey Young, actress, Dr. Irene Shulman on Melrose Place (born in Bloomfield Hills)
- Harrison Young, actor, elderly Private James Ryan in Saving Private Ryan (born in Port Huron)
- Karen Ziemba, Tony Award-winning stage actress, singer, and dancer (born in St. Joseph)
- Kim Zimmer, actress, Guiding Light (born in Grand Rapids)

== See also ==
- Lists of actors
- List of people from Michigan

== References and further reading ==
- Gavrilovich, Peter and Bill McGraw (2000). The Detroit Almanac. Detroit Free Press. ISBN 0-937247-34-0.
- Gavrilovich, Peter and Bill McGraw (2006). The Detroit Almanac, 2nd edition. Detroit Free Press. ISBN 978-0-937247-48-8.
