= List of Malian actors =

This is a list of actors and actresses from, or connected to, Mali. This list also includes members of the Malian diaspora. The list is arranged alphabetically by surname.

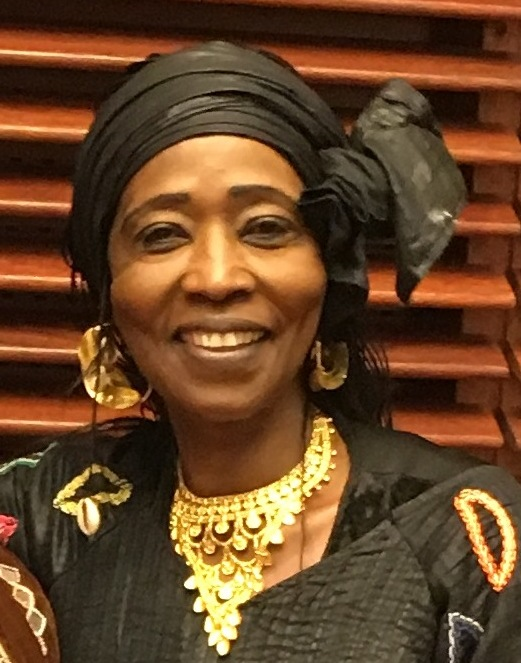
Fatoumata Coulibaly, 2017

== C ==
- Fatoumata Coulibaly (born 1950)

== D ==
- Habib Dembélé (born 1962)
- Youma Diakite
- Hélène Diarra

== H ==
- Eye Haïdara

== K ==
- Hamadoun Kassogué
- Balla Moussa Keïta
- Djibril Kouyaté

== T ==
- Awa Traoré
- Falaba Issa Traoré
- Tiécoura Traoré

== See also ==
- List of Malians
- List of Malian films
