= List of Danish actors =

This is a list of notable actors from Denmark.

== A ==
- Karl Gustav Ahlefeldt
- Jens Albinus
- Gwili Andre
- Christian Arhoff

== B ==
- Vivi Bach
- Aage Bendixen
- Anders Bircow
- Rasmus Bjerg
- Oliver Bjerrehuus
- Carsten Bjørnlund
- Anna Bloch
- Kim Bodnia
- Lars Bom
- Klaus Bondam
- Beatrice Bonnesen
- Anna Borg
- Frederik Buch
- Hans Egede Budtz
- Poul Bundgaard
- Zlatko Buric

== C ==
- Jakob Cedergren
- Jesper Christensen
- Nikolaj Coster-Waldau

== D ==
- Trine Dyrholm

== E ==
- Giancarlo Esposito

== F ==
- Mickey Faerch
- Olaf Fønss
- Mikkel Boe Følsgaard

== G ==
- Morten Grunwald
- Sofie Gråbøl

== H ==
- John Hahn-Petersen
- Caroline Halle-Müller
- Holger Juul Hansen
- Anne Louise Hassing
- Johanne Luise Heiberg
- Mimi Heinrich
- Bjarne Henriksen
- Iben Hjejle
- Josephine Højbjerg
- Astrid Holm
- Pelle Hvenegaard
- Allan Hyde

== J ==
- Ann Eleonora Jorgensen

== K ==
- Katja K
- Nikolaj Lie Kaas
- Kristian Kiehling
- Jesper Klein
- Sidse Babett Knudsen
- Kim Kold
- Brigitte Kolerus
- Svend Kornbeck
- Simon Kvamm

== L ==
- Thomas Bo Larsen
- Viggo Larsen
- Augusta Lütken (1855–1910), opera singer

== M ==
- Harald Madsen
- Preben Mahrt
- Peter Malberg
- Osa Massen
- Anders Matthesen
- Svend Melsing
- Cyron Melville
- Svend Methling
- Helle Michaelsen
- Lars Mikkelsen
- Mads Mikkelsen
- Bodil Miller (1928–2017)
- Viggo Mortensen
- Ib Mossin

== N ==
- Sigrid Neiiendam (1873–1955), actress
- Birthe Neumann
- Asta Nielsen
- Brigitte Nielsen
- Connie Nielsen
- Peter Nielsen
- Carsten Norgaard
- Ghita Nørby

== O ==
- Kirsten Olesen (born 1949), stage, film and TV actress

== P ==
- Dirch Passer
- Johanne Pedersen-Dan (1860–1934), actress and operetta singer
- Ulf Pilgaard
- Søren Pilmark
- Olaf Pooley
- Valdemar Psilander

== Q ==
- Berthe Qvistgaard

== R ==
- Lars Ranthe
- Rie Rasmussen
- Aage Redal
- Poul Reichhardt
- Kirsten Rolffes

== S ==
- Carl Schenstrøm
- Ib Schønberg
- Clara Schønfeld
- Ann Smyrner
- Ingeborg Spangsfeldt
- Jens Jørn Spottag
- Ove Sprogøe
- Karl Stegger
- Yutte Stensgaard
- Annette Stroyberg

== T ==
- Ulrich Thomsen
- Sven-Ole Thorsen

== U ==
- Ella Ungermann (1891–1921)
- Emilie Ullerup

== V ==
- Annette Vadim
- Valda Valkyrien
- Merete Van Kamp

== W ==
- Charlotte Wiehe-Berény
- Viggo Wiehe
- Carlo Wieth
- Aage Winther-Jørgensen
- Susse Wold

== Z ==
- Alice Bier Zandén

== See also ==
- List of Danes
- Lists of actors
