= List of Jamaican actors =

This is a list of notable actors born in Jamaica.

== List ==
- Carl Bradshaw (b. 1944, Kingston, Jamaica), actor, director and producer
- Cherine Anderson (b. 1984, East Kingston, Jamaica), actress and dancehall/reggae vocalist
- Esther Anderson (b. 1946, Saint Mary Parish), filmmaker, photographer and actress
- Roxanne Beckford (b. 1969, Kingston, Jamaica), film and television actress
- Martine Beswick (b. 1941, Port Antonio, Jamaica), model and actress
- Paul Campbell (b. Jamaica), film and stage actor
- Doña Croll (b. 1959, Jamaica), television actress
- Dhalia Harris (b. Spanish Town), actress, television personality
- Charles Hyatt (b. 1931, Kingston, Jamaica; d. 2007), film and television actor
- Clifton Jones (b. 1943, Jamaica), television actor
- Elroy Josephs (b. 1939, Jamaica; d. 1997), actor and dancer who was the first black dance teacher at a British University
- Venice Kong (b. 1961, St. Mary, Jamaica), model and actress
- Ky-Mani Marley (b. 1976, Falmouth, Jamaica), actor and reggae musician
- Louis Marriott (b. 1935, St. Andrew, Jamaica), actor, director, writer and broadcaster
- Yanna McIntosh (b. Jamaica), film, television and stage actress
- Count Prince Miller (b. 1935, Saint Mary Parish, Jamaica), actor and musician
- Evan Parke (b. 1968, Kingston, Jamaica), film and television actor
- Keith 'Shebada' Ramsey (b. Kingston, Jamaica), actor and comedian
- David Tulloch (b. 1981, Kingston, Jamaica), playwright, actor, director, producer, technical director, composer
- Audrey Reid (b. 1970, East Kingston, Jamaica), film actress
- David Reivers (b. 1958, Kingston, Jamaica), film and television actor
- Oliver Samuels (b. 1948, St. Mary, Jamaica), comedian and television actor
- Dennis Scott (b. 1939, Kingston, Jamaica; d. 1991), playwright, actor, dancer and poet
- Madge Sinclair (b. 1938, Kingston, Jamaica; d. 1995), film and television actress
- Roy Stewart (b. 1925, Jamaica; d. 2008), actor who ran Caribbean restaurant The Globe in Notting Hill
- Peter Straker (b. 1943, Jamaica), actor and singer
- Peter Williams (b. 1957, Kingston), film and television actor
- Cornelius Grant (actor director producer artiste host) (b 1986), Kingston, film and television

== See also ==
- List of Jamaicans
