= List of Portuguese film actors =

This is a list of film actors from Portugal.

- Beatriz Batarda (born 1974)
- Daniela Melchior (born 1996)
- Diogo Morgado (born 1981)
- Rafael Morais (born 1989)
- Joaquim de Almeida (born 1957)
- Leonor Silveira (born 1970)
- Lúcia Moniz (born 1976)
- Luis Da Silva (born 1982)
- Edgar Morais (born 1989)
- Luís Miguel Cintra (born 1949)
- Nuno Lopes (born 1978)
- Maria de Medeiros (born 1965)
- Rita Blanco (born 1963)

== See also ==
- Lists of actors
- List of Portuguese people
