= List of Irish child actors =

This is a list of child actors from the Republic of Ireland. Films and/or television series they appeared in are mentioned only if they were still a child at the time of filming.

Current child actors (under the age of eighteen) are indicated by boldface.

== B ==
- Emma Bolger (born 1995)
  - In America (2002)
  - Intermission (2003)
  - Heidi (2005)
  - The Snow Prince (2006)
- Sarah Bolger (born 1991)
  - In America (2002)
  - In America (2003)
  - Tara Road (2005)
  - Stormbreaker (2006)
  - The Spiderwick Chronicles (2008)
  - The Tudors (2008-2010)
  - Iron Cross (2009)
  - The Fence (2009)
  - The Moth Diaries (2011)
  - From Up on Poppy Hill (2011)

== E ==
- Elizabeth Rebecca Edwin (c. 1771–1854), made her stage debut at age eight in Dublin.

== F ==
- Ciarán Fitzgerald (born 1983)
  - Into the West (1992)
  - Screen Two (1 episode, 1994)
  - The Hanging Gale (1995)
  - Nothing Personal (1995)
  - Some Mother's Son (1996)
  - The Last of the High Kings (1996)
  - The Canterville Ghost (1996)
  - The Informant (1997)
  - The Boxer (1997)
  - Seeing Things (short film, 1997)
  - The General (1998)
- Gregg Fitzgerald (born 1978)
  - War of the Buttons (1994)
  - A Soldier's Song (tv short, 1997)
  - The Butcher Boy (1997)
  - EastEnders (1997)
  - The Butcher Boy (1998)
  - Le frère Irlandais (1999)
  - One Man's Hero (1999)

== G ==
- Jack Gleeson (born 1992)
  - Reign of Fire (2002)
  - Batman Begins (2005)
  - Shrooms (2007)
  - A Shine of Rainbows (2009)
  - All Good Children (2010)

== L ==
- Evanna Lynch (born 1991)
  - Harry Potter and the Order of the Phoenix (2007)
  - Harry Potter and the Half-Blood Prince (2009)
  - Harry Potter and the Deathly Hallows – Part 1 (2010)
  - Harry Potter and the Deathly Hallows – Part 2 (2011)

== M ==
- Lara McDonnell (born 2003)
  - Love, Rosie (2014)
  - To Walk Invisible (2016)
  - The Delinquent Season (2018)
  - Artemis Fowl (2020)
  - Belfast (2021)
  - Greatest Days (2023)
- Devon Murray (born 1988)
  - This Is My Father (1998)
  - Angela's Ashes (1999)
  - Yesterday's Children (2000)
  - Harry Potter and the Philosopher's Stone (2001)
  - Harry Potter and the Chamber of Secrets (2002)
  - Kelly (2002)
  - Interviews with Students (2003)
  - Head to Shrunken Head (2004)
  - Harry Potter and the Prisoner of Azkaban (2004)
  - Harry Potter and the Goblet of Fire (2005)
  - Reflections on the Fourth Film (2006)
  - Harry Potter and the Order of the Phoenix (2007)
  - Gone Fishing (short film, 2008)
  - The Podge and Rodge Show (2008)
  - The 9th Meteor Ireland Music Awards (2008)
  - Harry Potter and the Half-Blood Prince (2009)
  - Harry Potter and the Deathly Hallows – Part 1 (2010)
  - Harry Potter and the Deathly Hallows – Part 2 (2011)

== P ==
- Susie Power (born 2003)
  - Fair City (2015–2017)
  - Little Roy (2015–2017)
  - A Date for Mad Mary (2016)

== R ==
- Saoirse Ronan (born 1994)
  - Atonement (2007)
  - Harry Potter and the Order of the Phoenix (2007)
  - I Could Never Be Your Woman (2007)
  - Death Defying Acts (2008)
  - City of Ember (2008)
  - The Lovely Bones (2009)
  - The Way Back (2010)
  - Hanna (2011)
  - Violet & Daisy (2011)
  - Byzantium (2012)
  - The Host (2013)
  - How I Live Now (2013)
  - Justin and the Knights of Valour (2013)
  - The Grand Budapest Hotel (2014)
  - Lost River (2014)

== V ==
- Sophie Vavasseur (born 1992)
  - Evelyn (2002)
  - Resident Evil: Apocalypse (2004)
  - Northanger Abbey (2007)
  - Becoming Jane (2007)
  - The Old Curiosity Shop (2007)
  - Exorcismus (2010)

== W ==
- **Alisha Weir** (born 2009)
  - Don't Leave Home (2018)
  - Day Out (short film, 2018)
  - Darklands (5 episodes, 2019)
  - Two by Two: Overboard! (voice, 2020)
  - Fia's Fairies (voice, 2022)
  - Matilda the Musical (2022)
  - Wicked Little Letters (2023)
  - Abigail (2024)
  - Buffalo Kids (2024)
