= List of Senegalese actors =

This is a list of notable Senegalese actors listed in alphabetic order by surname.

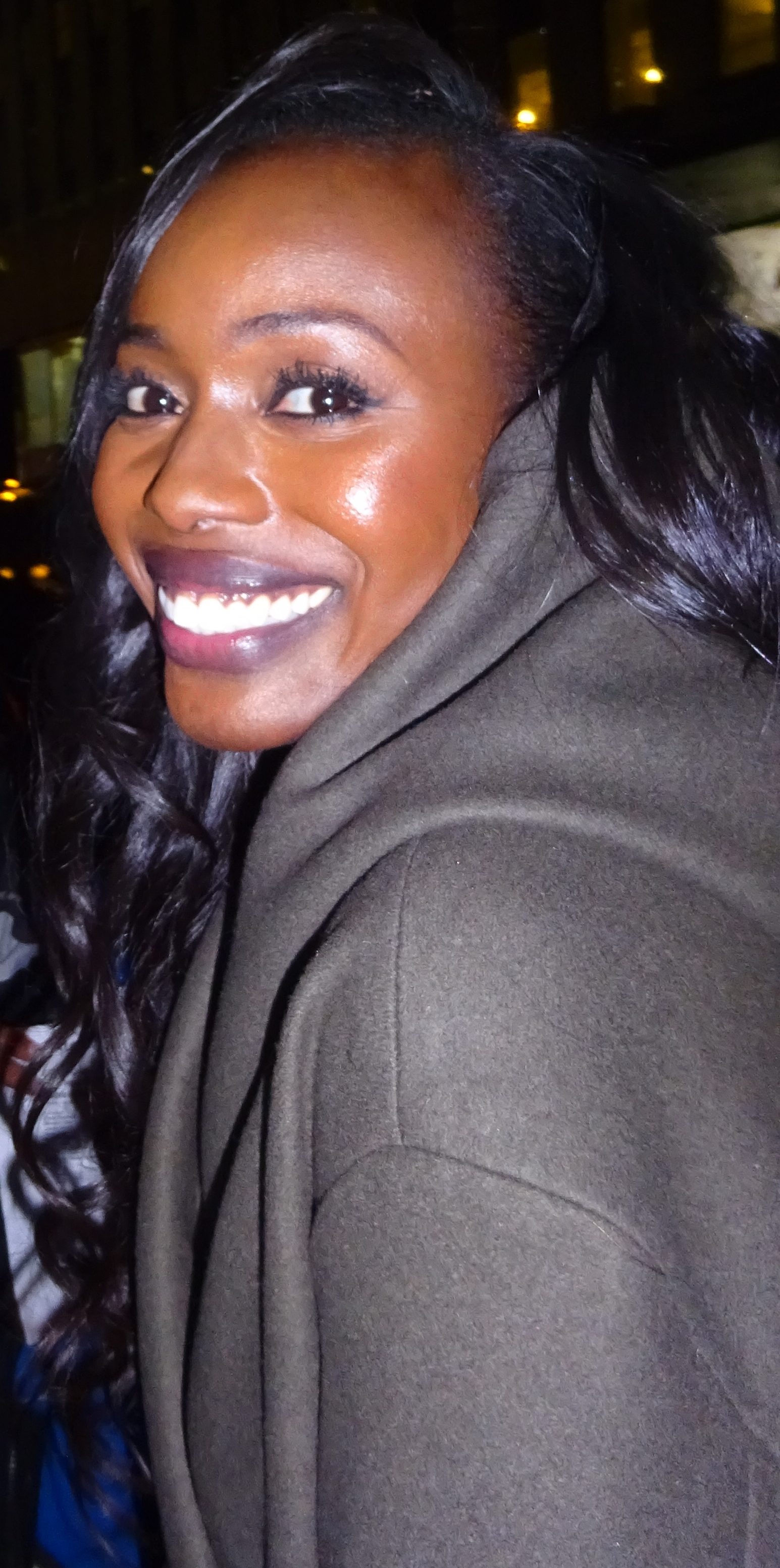
Anna Diop in 2016

== B ==
- Kador Ben-Salim
- Mame Bineta Sane

== D ==
- Raymond Dandy
- Marie Madeleine Diallo
- Anna Diop
- Mouss Diouf

== F ==
- Safi Faye

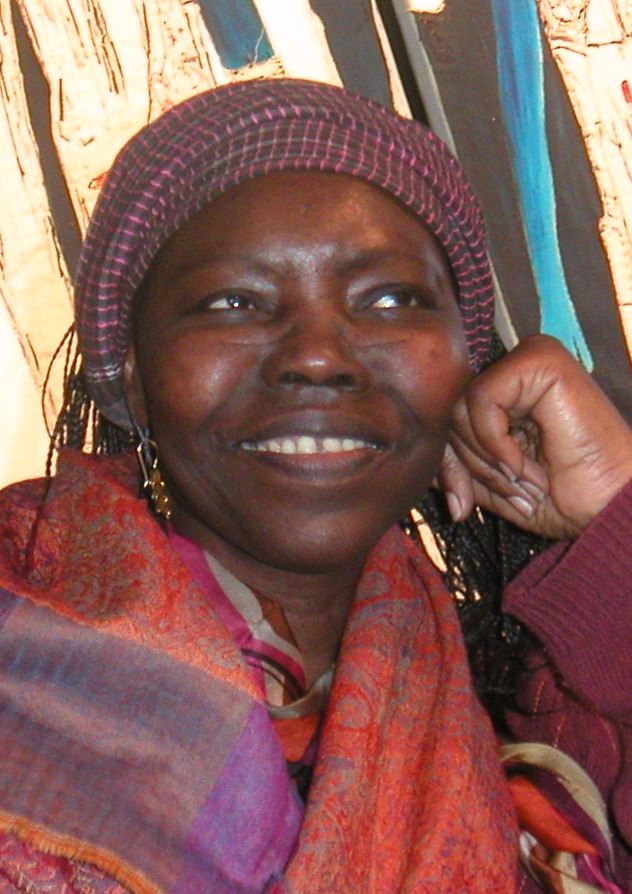
Safi Faye, 2004

== G ==
- Maïmouna Gueye

== L ==
- Amadou Ly

== M ==
- Aïssa Maïga
- Kre M'Baye

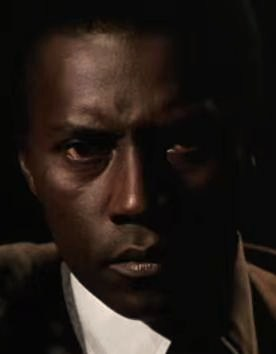
Johnny Sekka, 1974

== N ==
- Fatou N'Diaye
- Rokhaya Niang

== S ==
- Johnny Sekka
- Omar Sy

== See also ==
- Cinema of Senegal
- List of Senegalese people
