= List of St Trinian's films cast members =

A list of actors who have appeared in the St Trinian's School films.

- Hermione Baddeley
- Dora Bryan
- George Cole
- Carole Ann Ford
- Joyce Grenfell
- Irene Handl
- Frankie Howerd
- Raymond Huntley
- Sid James
- Peter Jones
- John Le Mesurier
- Cecil Parker
- Beryl Reid
- Sabrina (actress)
- Terry Scott
- Alastair Sim
- Joan Sims
- Terry-Thomas
- Reg Varney
- Thorley Walters
