= Carmen Bonaplata =

Spanish operatic soprano

Carmen Bonaplata-Bau
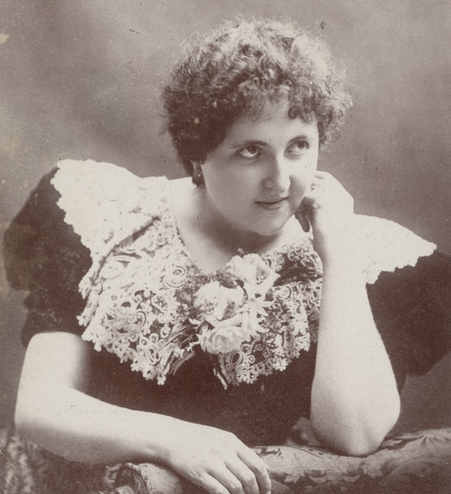
- Carmen Bonaplata (1896)
- Spouse: Lorenzo Bau

Carmen Bonaplata-Bau (1871–1911) was a Spanish operatic soprano who made her début at the Teatro Dal Verme in Milan in 1886 in the title role of Verdi's Aida. From 1892, she appeared on several occasions at La Scala but also sang in New York (1896), Buenos Aires (1897) and in her native Barcelona (1902). She frequently performed the role of Aida until her retirement from the stage in 1904.

== Biography ==
Born in 1871 in Barcelona, Carmen Bonaplata was the daughter of the actor and writer Teodor Bonaplata (1841–1904). She studied under Ignacio Jumadrea and later under the pianist and conductor Lorenzo Bau (1858–1916), whom she married in 1890.

Bonaplata made her début in 1886 at Milan's Teatro Dal Verme singing the title role in Aida. In 1890, she played Marguerite in Gounod's Faust at the Teatro Argentina in Rome. During the 1892–93 season, she performed at La Scala, first as Isabella in Alberto Franchetti's Cristoforo Colombo, then as Senta in Wagner's Der fliegende Holländer and finally as Jeftele in Ponchielli's Il figliuol prodigo.

The following year (1893–94) she took the title role of Ponchielli's La Gioconda at the Teatro Real in Madrid and later at Seville's Teatro de San Fernando. She returned to La Scala in 1894 to play Sieglinde in Wagner's Die Walküre as well as the title role in Alfredo Catalani's Loreley. In 1895 she appeared in Buenos Aires, in 1896 she toured the United States, and in 1897 she sang in St Petersburg and Moscow. She is remembered for many other impressive roles including Margherita in Arrigo Boito's Mefistofele (in Bologna, Bari, Rome, Milan and Turin), Desdemona in Verdi's Otello, Valentine in Giacomo Meyerbeer's Les Huguenots, Else in Lohengrin and Santuzza in Cavalleria rusticana. Before retiring in 1904, she played Tosca at Barcelona's Teatro Liceo. After retiring from the stage, she devoted her time to teaching. Critics of the period reported on her powerful voice and balanced technique, as well as her talents as an actress.

Carmen Bonaplata died in Barcelona on 11 February 1911.
