= Irène Tassembédo =

Burkinabe choreographer and comedian (born 1957)

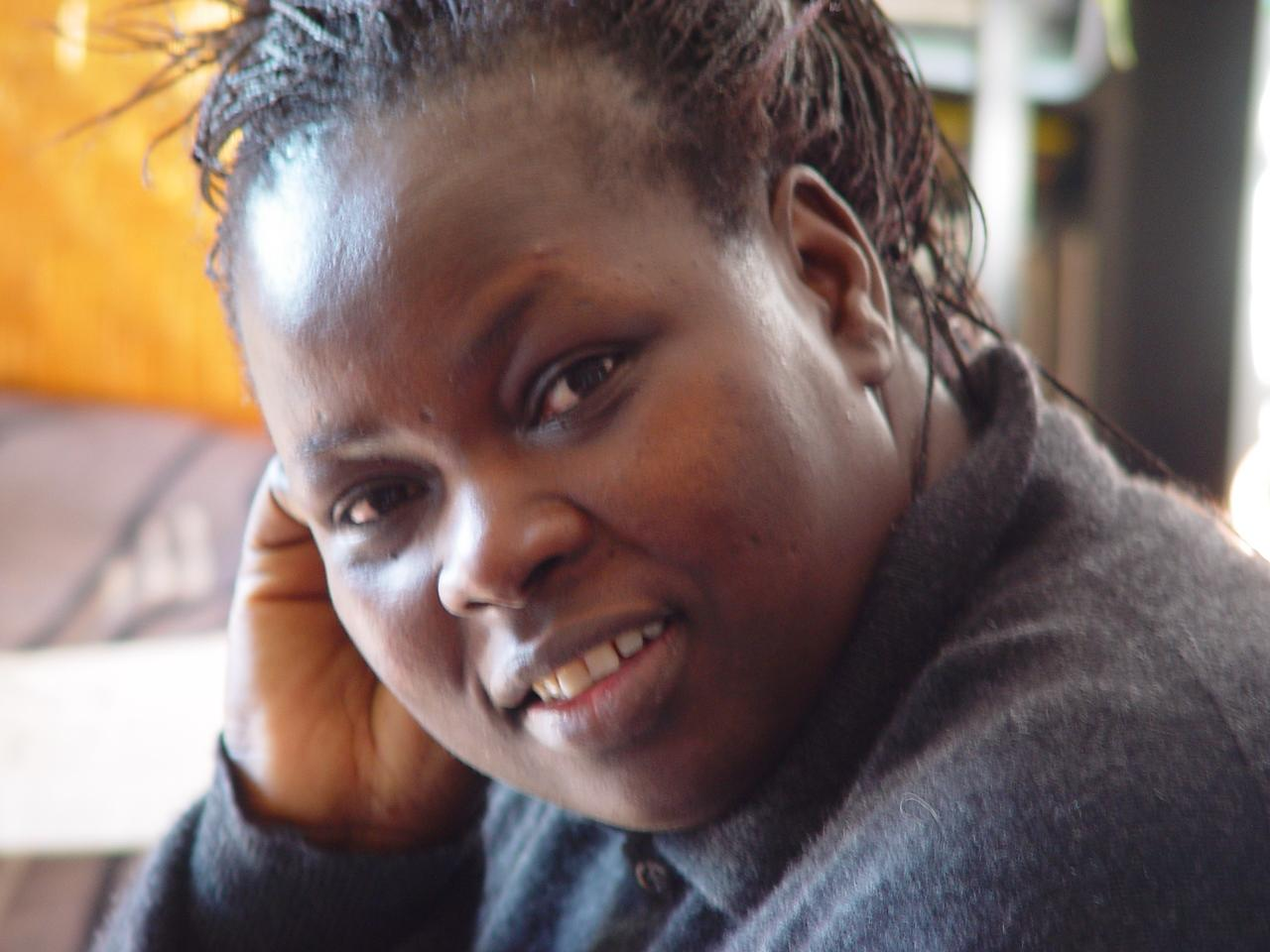
- Born: August 19, 1957 (age 68)
- Occupation: Dancer

Irène Tassembédo (born 19 August 1956) is a dancer, choreographer and actress from Burkina Faso.

== Biography ==
She discovered traditional dance in Ouagadougou, then was trained in contemporary European dance, with Germaine Acogny, at the Mudra Afrique school, which was started by Maurice Béjart in Dakar.

Following this training, she first moved to Europe as a dancer in the early 1980s. She returned regularly to Burkina Faso, and also undertook workshops in various cities in the United States and in Europe. In 1988, she created Compagnie Ébène in Paris, with which she toured in different countries to present her work as a choreographer. She associated herself and travelled with a company called Fusion in 1988 and with Diminoïda in 1989. She took part in the Caravane d'Afrique Francophone summit in Paris in 1991. She started Yenenga while still in Paris, in October 1992.

In 1993, she traveled with her company to the first show of African arts and entertainment in Abidjan. She got noticed and was selected for the biennial dance of Lyon, in 1994, and gradually builds up a notoriety as a choreographer. In the same year of 1988 she launched Ebène in Paris. She also worked in her native country upon the establishment of the National Ballet of Burkina Faso. According to Irène Tassembédo: "Before that, there were only local troops. We gathered dancers from different provinces of Burkina, everyone learned the dances [they] did not know".
