= List of Malaysian actors =

This is a list of notable Malaysian actors.

== List ==
=== A ===
- Zahiril Adzim
- Fattah Amin
- David Arumugam
- Awal Ashaari
- Aedy Ashraf
- Aaron Aziz

=== B ===
- Ning Baizura

=== C ===
- Amber Chia

=== D ===
- Iqram Dinzly

=== E ===
- Faezah Elai

=== F ===
- Erra Fazira

=== G ===
- 'Punnagai Poo' Gheetha

=== H ===
- Chen Hanwei

=== I ===
- Sarimah Ibrahim
- Hans Isaac
- Remy Ishak
- Izzue Islam

=== J ===
- Ayda Jebat
- Tang Jun-sang

=== K ===
- Kamahl
- Farid Kamil
- Sangeeta Krishnasamy
- Beto Kusyairy
- Syafiq Kyle

=== L ===
- Angelica Lee
- James Lee
- Mandy Lieu

=== M ===
- Rani Moorthy

=== N ===
- Ash Nair
- Pushpa Narayan

=== O ===
- Aziz M. Osman

=== P ===
- Francissca Peter

=== R ===
- Ramya Raj
- P. Ramlee
- Zizan Razak
- Aisha Retno

=== S ===
- Sarimah
- Alif Satar
- Guy Sebastian
- Nelydia Senrose
- Jins Shamsuddin
- Haanii Shivraj
- Kavita Sidhu
- Huzir Sulaiman

=== T ===
- Nicholas Teo
- Nadine Ann Thomas

=== V ===
- Chacko Vadaketh
- Malaysia Vasudevan
- Jaclyn Victor
- Adrian Voo

=== W ===
- Bala Ganapathi William

=== Y ===
- Michelle Yeoh
- Syafiq Yusof
- Syamsul Yusof

=== Z ===
- Zaiton
- You Zhangjing
- Julia Ziegler
