= List of Pirates of the Caribbean film actors =

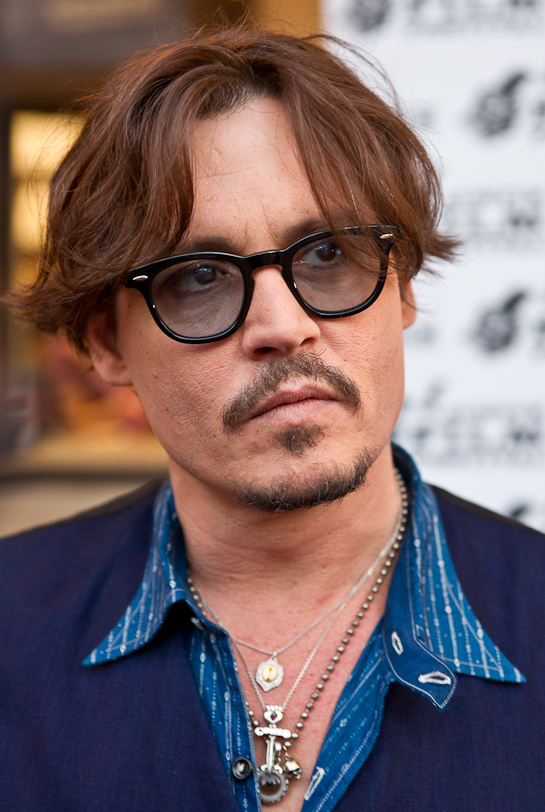
Johnny Depp

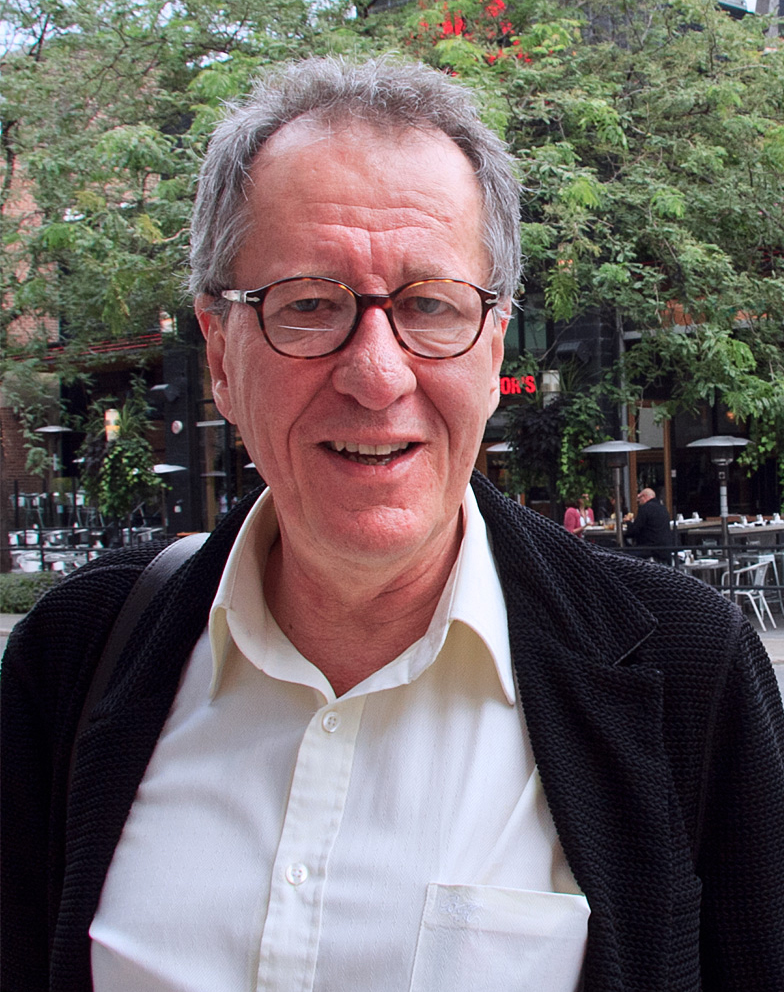
Geoffrey Rush

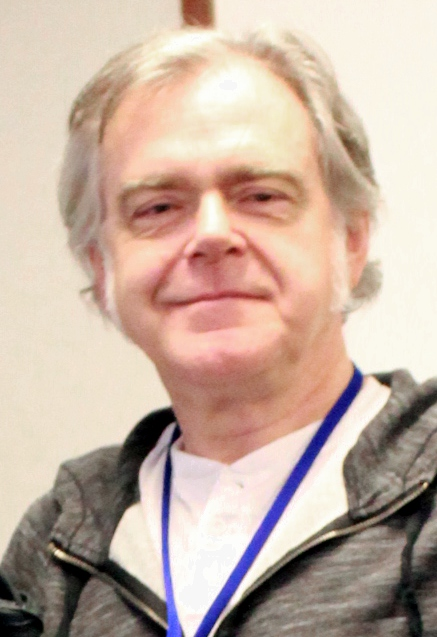
Kevin McNally

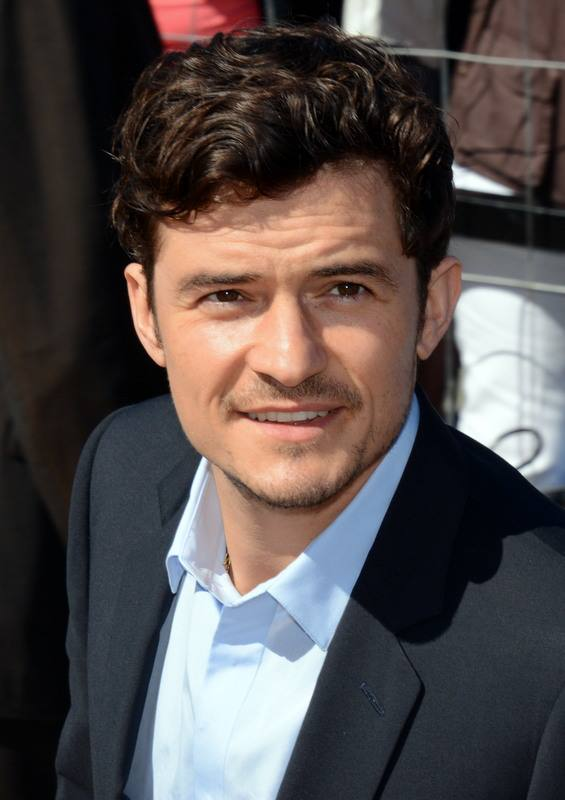
Orlando Bloom

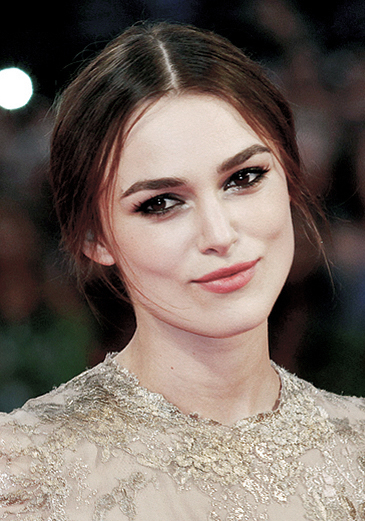
Keira Knightley

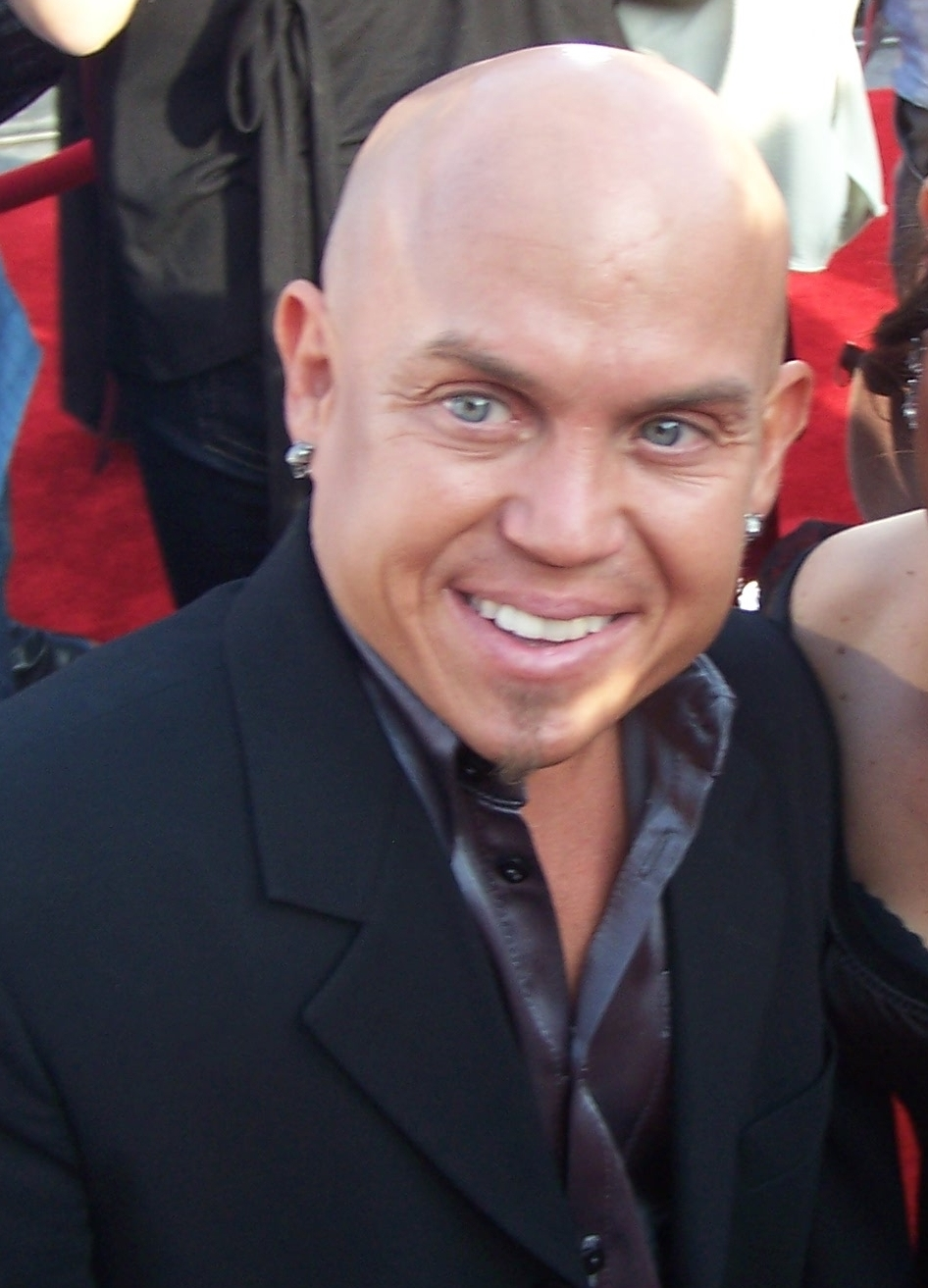
Martin Klebba

Johnny Depp, Geoffrey Rush, Kevin McNally, Orlando Bloom, Keira Knightley, and Martin Klebba appeared in at least four films. Only Depp, Rush, and McNally reprised their roles in all five films.

This is a list of Pirates of the Caribbean film actors who portrayed appearing in the film series. The list below is sorted by film and the character's surname, as some characters have been portrayed by multiple actors.

== Cast and characters ==
List indicators

This section includes characters who will appear or have appeared in the franchise.

- An empty grey cell indicates the character was not in the film, or that the character's official presence has not yet been confirmed.
- ^{C} indicates a cameo role.
- ^{O} indicates an older version of the character.
- ^{S} indicates an appearance through use of special effects.
- ^{U} indicates an uncredited appearance.
- ^{V} indicates a voice-only role.
- ^{Y} indicates a younger version of the character.

Character
Character	2003	2006	2007	2011	2017
Character	The Curse of the Black Pearl	Dead Man's Chest	At World's End	On Stranger Tides	Dead Men Tell No Tales
=== Introduced in The Curse of the Black Pearl ===
Anamaria	Zoe Saldaña				
Captain Hector Barbossa	Geoffrey Rush	Geoffrey Rush^{C}	Geoffrey Rush	Geoffrey Rush	Geoffrey Rush
Bo'sun	Isaac C. Singleton Jr.				
Cotton	David Bailie	David Bailie	David Bailie		
Twigg	Michael Berry Jr.				
Joshamee Gibbs	Kevin McNally	Kevin McNally	Kevin McNally	Kevin McNally	Kevin McNally
Lieutenant Gillette	Damian O'Hare			Damian O'Hare	
Giselle	Vanessa Branch	Vanessa Branch	Vanessa Branch		
Grapple	Trevor Goddard				
Lieutenant Commander Theodore Groves	Greg Ellis		Greg Ellis	Greg Ellis	
Koehler	Treva Etienne				
Marty	Martin Klebba	Martin Klebba	Martin Klebba		Martin Klebba
Mullroy	Angus Barnett		Angus Barnett		Angus Barnett
Murtogg	Giles New		Giles New		Giles New
Commodore James Norrington	Jack Davenport	Jack Davenport	Jack Davenport		
Pintel	Lee Arenberg	Lee Arenberg	Lee Arenberg		
Ragetti	Mackenzie Crook	Mackenzie Crook	Mackenzie Crook		
Mr. Brown	Ralph P. Martin				
Harbormaster	Guy Siner				
Butler	Paul Keith				
Estrella	Paula J. Newman				
Captain Jack Sparrow	Johnny Depp	Johnny Depp	Johnny Depp	Johnny Depp	Johnny Depp Anthony De La Torre^{Y}
Captain Elizabeth Swann-Turner	Keira Knightley Lucinda Dryzek^{Y}	Keira Knightley	Keira Knightley		Keira Knightley^{C}
Governor Weatherby Swann	Jonathan Pryce	Jonathan Pryce	Jonathan Pryce		
William "Will" Turner, Jr.	Orlando Bloom Dylan Smith^{Y}	Orlando Bloom	Orlando Bloom		Orlando Bloom^{C}
=== Introduced in Dead Man's Chest ===
Lord Cutler Beckett		Tom Hollander	Tom Hollander		
Tia Dalma Calypso		Naomie Harris	Naomie Harris		
Davy Jones		Bill Nighy	Bill Nighy		Stand-in^{S}
Ian Mercer		David Schofield	David Schofield		
William "Bootstrap Bill" Turner		Stellan Skarsgård	Stellan Skarsgård		
=== Introduced in At World's End ===
Captain Ammand			Ghassan Massoud		
Askay / Pusasn			Omid Djalili		
Capitaine Chevalle			Marcel Iureș		
Mistress Ching			Takayo Fischer		
Sao Feng			Chow Yun-fat		
Tai Huang			Reggie Lee		
Captain Jocard			Hakeem Kae-Kazim		
Captain Edward Teague			Keith Richards	Keith Richards	Alexander Scheer^{Y}
Henry William Turner			Dominic Scott Kay^{C}		Brenton Thwaites Lewis McGowan^{Y}
=== Introduced in On Stranger Tides ===
Angelica				Penélope Cruz	
Lord John Carteret				Anton Lesser	
King Ferdinand VI of Spain				Sebastian Armesto	
King George II of Great Britain				Richard Griffiths	
Prime Minister Henry Pelham				Roger Allam	
Scrum				Stephen Graham	Stephen Graham
The Spaniard				Óscar Jaenada	
Philip Swift				Sam Claflin	
Syrena				Àstrid Bergès-Frisbey	
Edward "Blackbeard" Teach				Ian McShane	
=== Introduced in Dead Men Tell No Tales ===
Mayor Dix					Bruce Spence
Uncle Jack					Paul McCartney^{C}
Captain Armando Salazar					Javier Bardem
Lieutenant John Scarfield					David Wenham
Shansa					Golshifteh Farahani
Carina Smyth Barbossa					Kaya Scodelario
