= List of Gargoyles cast members =

This article contains a list of voice actors who worked on the animated series Gargoyles.

== Regular cast members ==
Voice actors in Gargoyles were credited only for episodes in which they appeared, with the most frequent credits going to those actors voicing the protagonists of the series and their most prominent enemies.

Cast member	Characters	Season 1 episodes	Season 2 episodes
Thom Adcox-Hernandez	Lexington	13	32
Ed Asner	Hudson, Jack Danforth	13	32
Brigitte Bako	Angela	0	31
Jeff Bennett	Brooklyn, The Magus, Owen Burnett, Vinnie	13	35
Keith David	Goliath, Thailog, Officer Morgan	13	51
Bill Fagerbakke	Broadway	13	32
Jonathan Frakes	David Xanatos, Coyote	9	21
Salli Richardson	Elisa Maza, Salli, Delilah	13	46
Marina Sirtis	Demona, Margot Yale	8	14
Frank Welker	Bronx, Boudicca, Cagney, Gilgamesh, Gilly	13	

== Recurring cast members ==
- Monica Allison – Beth Maza
- Diedrich Bader – Jason Canmore (Jason Conover), Charles Canmore
- Michael Bell – Martin Hacker, Pal Joey
- James Belushi – Fang
- Xander Berkeley – Coldsteel
- Clancy Brown – Hakon, Wolf, Tomas Brod
- Rocky Carroll – Talon, Glasses
- Cam Clarke – Young Gillecomgain
- Scott Cleverdon – Rory Dugan/Cuchulain, Jon Canmore (Jon Carter), John Castaway (post-"The Journey" appearances)
- Robert Culp – Halcyon Renard
- Jim Cummings – Dingo, Hunter, Mr. Acme
- Tim Curry – Anton Sevarius
- J. D. Daniels – Young Tom, Young Canmore I, Young Jon Canmore
- Neil Dickson – Griff, Duncan
- Michael Dorn – Coldstone, Taurus
- Sheena Easton – Finella, Banshee, Robyn Canmore (Robyn Correy)
- Matt Frewer – Jackal
- Ed Gilbert – the Captain of the Guard, Bodhe
- Gerrit Graham – Adult Tom (The Guardian)
- Richard Grieco – Anthony "Tony" Dracon
- Charles Hallahan – Travis Marshall, Macduff; also voiced incidental characters, such as Mr. Jaffe, a Janitor, and a Quarryman
- Michael Horse – Peter Maza
- Clyde Kusatsu – Dr Arnada, Kai
- Terrence Mann – Oberon
- Kate Mulgrew – Titania, Anastasia Renard
- Nichelle Nichols – Diane Maza
- C. C. H. Pounder – Desdemona, Coldfire
- Gregg Rainwater – Natsilani, Coyote
- Roger Rees – Prince Malcolm
- John Rhys-Davies – Macbeth
- Emma Samms – Gruoch-Lady Macbeth
- Laura San Giacomo – Fox (Laura San Giacomo is the only cast member whose name never appeared in any of the credits for episodes she worked on)
- Ruben Santiago-Hudson – Gabriel
- Peter Scolari – Preston Vogel
- W. Morgan Sheppard – Petros Xanatos, Odin, King Kenneth
- Kath Soucie – The Weird Sisters, Princess Katharine, Maggie "the Cat" Reed, Ophelia
- Brent Spiner – Puck
- John St. Ryan – King Arthur Pendragon
- Cree Summer – Hyena
- Rachel Ticotin – Maria Chavez
- David Warner – The Archmage
- Thomas F. Wilson – Matt Bluestone
- Paul Winfield – Jeffrey Robbins

== Guest stars ==
- James Avery – the Shaman
- Lawrence Bayne – Raven
- Gregg Berger – Leo
- Avery Brooks – Nokkar
- LeVar Burton – Anansi
- Alan Cumming – John Castaway (episode "The Journey")
- Amentha Dymally – Grandmother
- Sarah Douglas – Una
- Hector Elizondo – Zaphiro
- Dorian Harewood – Boreas, Talos
- Charity James – Ekidna
- Tony Jay – Anubis
- Bruce Locke – Yama
- Anndi McAfee – Young Princess Katharine
- Darren McGavin – Dominic Dracon
- Colm Meaney – Mr. Dugan
- Haunani Minn – Sora
- Roddy McDowall – Proteus
- Rob Paulsen – Helios
- James Saito – Taro
- Tony Shalhoub – the Emir
- Charles Shaughnessy – Douglas Bader
- Ric Young – Hiroshi

== Star Trek connection ==
A number of voice actors for the show were starring actors in various Star Trek series:

- Marina Sirtis (Deanna Troi on The Next Generation)
- Jonathan Frakes (William Riker on The Next Generation)
- Kate Mulgrew (Kathryn Janeway on Voyager)
- Michael Dorn (Worf on The Next Generation and Deep Space Nine)
- Brent Spiner (Data on The Next Generation)
- LeVar Burton (Geordi La Forge on The Next Generation)
- Colm Meaney (Miles O'Brien on The Next Generation and Deep Space Nine)
- Avery Brooks (Benjamin Sisko on Deep Space Nine)
- Nichelle Nichols (Uhura on Star Trek)

Many also appeared as guests in Star Trek at one time or another:

- Salli Richardson (Nidell in "Second Sight")
- John Rhys-Davies (Leonardo da Vinci on Voyager)
- Frank Welker (Voices of Spock screaming in Star Trek III, and the alien creature in "Nothing Human")
- Clancy Brown (Zobral in "Desert Crossing")
- Matt Frewer (Berlingoff Rasmussen in "A Matter of Time")
- James Saito (Lt. Nogami in "The 37’s")
- W. Morgan Sheppard (Ira Graves in "The Schizoid Man", Qatai in "Bliss", the Klingon warden in Star Trek VI: The Undiscovered Country, and a science minister in the 2009 Star Trek film)
- Michael Bell (Zorn in "Encounter at Farpoint", Borum in "The Homecoming", and Drofo Awa in "The Maquis")
- Gerrit Graham (Hunter in "Captive Pursuit", and Quinn in "Death Wish")
- David Warner (St. John Talbot in Star Trek V: The Final Frontier, Gorkon in Star Trek VI, and Gul Madred in "Chain of Command")
- Diedrich Bader (Tactical Officer in "The Emissary")
- Robert Ito (Lt. Chang in ‘’Coming of Age’’, and John Kim in ‘’Author, Author’’)
- Clyde Kusatsu (Vice Admiral Nakamura on The Next Generation)
- Paul Winfield (Clark Terrell in Star Trek II and Dathon in "Darmok")
- Tony Jay (Minister Campio in "Cost of Living")
- James Avery (General K'Vagh in "Affliction")

Patrick Stewart (Jean-Luc Picard on The Next Generation) was also considered for a role in the series, but his representation turned down the offer because his usual fees could not be met.

Producer Greg Weisman has commented that, at first, the casting of multiple Star Trek actors was unintentional. Marina Sirtis and Jonathan Frakes were both cast in prominent roles, and quickly the show's staff began to think of other Star Trek actors when casting new roles. Frakes and Sirtis were also instrumental in "talking up" the Gargoyles series to fellow Star Trek cast members, and encouraging them to participate.

This "Star Trek connection" was given a nod to by script writers in at least one instance within the cartoon. In the episode "Her Brother's Keeper" (1x12), Brooklyn remarks: "Yeah? You and what Starfleet?"
