= List of American actors of Irish descent =

This is a list of notable Irish American actors.

To be included in this list, the person must have a Wikipedia article and references showing the person is Irish American and a notable actor.

The list is organized in reverse chronological order of birth decades and all of the actors' surnames are in alphabetical order.

== 21st century ==
=== 2000s ===
- Charlie Bushnell (2004– )
- Megan Lawless (2000– )
- Peyton Elizabeth Lee (2004– )
- Damian Hurley (2002– )
- Romy Mars (2006– )
- Raymond Ochoa (2001– )
- Frankie Jonas (2000– )
- Fátima Ptacek (2000– )
- Elizabeth Yu (2002– )

== 20th century ==
=== 1990s ===
- Jake T. Austin (1994– )
- Abigail Breslin (1992– )
- Angus Cloud (1998–2023)
- Chris Colfer (1990– )
- Miranda Cosgrove (1993– )
- Zoey Deutch (1994– )
- Noah Galvin (1994– )
- Arielle Holmes (1993– )
- Nick Jonas (1992– )
- Demi Lovato (1992– )
- Daryl McCormack (1992– ), dual Irish and American
- Katherine McNamara (1995– )
- Dylan O'Brien (1991– )
- Brittany O'Grady (1996– )
- Ryan Potter (1995- ), mother of partial Irish ancestry
- Jack Reynor (1992– ), dual Irish and American citizen
- AnnaSophia Robb (1993– )
- Emma Roberts (1991– )
- Saoirse Ronan (1994– ), dual Irish and American citizen
- Rachel Sennott (1995–)
- Kiernan Shipka (1999–)

=== 1980s ===
- Mischa Barton (1986– )
- Kristen Bell (1980– )
- Amanda Bynes (1986– )
- Lauren Cohan (1982– )
- Darren Criss (1987– )
- Kieran Culkin (1982– )
- Macaulay Culkin (1980– )
- Rory Culkin (1989– )
- Zooey Deschanel (1980– )
- Aarón Díaz (1982– )
- Alyssa Diaz (1985– )
- Chris Evans (1981– )
- Megan Fox (1986– )
- David Gallagher (1985– )
- Sasha Grey (1988– )
- Anne Hathaway (1982– )
- Vanessa Hudgens (1988– )
- Joe Jonas (1989– )
- Kevin Jonas (1987– )
- Scarlett Keegan (1984– )
- Riley Keough (1989– )
- Anna Kendrick (1985– )
- Beyoncé Knowles (1981– )
- Lindsay Lohan (1986– )
- Jena Malone (1984– )
- Kate Mara (1983– )
- Rooney Mara (1985– )
- John Mulaney (1982– )
- Frankie Muniz (1985– )
- Olivia Munn (1980– )
- Chord Overstreet (1989– )
- Christina Ricci (1980– )
- Julia Stiles (1981– )
- Emma Stone (1988– )
- Jessica Sutta (1982– )
- Ashley Tisdale (1985– )
- Jonathan Tucker (1982– )
- Danielle Vega (1986– )
- Olivia Wilde (1984– )
- Deborah Ann Woll (1985– )

=== 1970s ===
- Ben Affleck (1972– )
- Casey Affleck (1975– )
- Mackenzie Astin (1973– )
- Sean Astin (1971– )
- Elizabeth Banks (1974– )
- Drew Barrymore (1975– )
- Lara Flynn Boyle (1970– )
- Eddie Cahill (1978– )
- Holly Marie Combs (1973– )
- Michaela Conlin (1978– )
- Jennifer Connelly (1970– )
- Dane Cook (1972– )
- Bradley Cooper (1975– )
- Sofia Coppola (1971– )
- Monique Gabriela Curnen (1970– )
- Emily Deschanel (1976– )
- Carmen Electra (1972– )
- Jimmy Fallon (1974– )
- Heather Graham (1970– )
- Carla Gugino (1971– )
- Alyson Hannigan (1974– )
- Angie Harmon (1972– )
- Josh Hartnett (1978– )
- Katherine Heigl (1978– )
- Joshua Jackson (1978– )
- Dwayne Johnson (1972– )
- Robert Kelly (1970– )
- Jamie Kennedy (1970– )
- Ashton Kutcher (1978– )
- Eric Mabius (1971– )
- Rachael MacFarlane (1976– )
- Seth MacFarlane (1973– )
- Danny Masterson (1976– )t
- Jenny McCarthy (1972– )
- Rose McGowan (1973– )
- Danica McKellar (1975– )
- Jason Momoa (1979– )
- Bridget Moynahan (1971– )
- Brittany Murphy (1977–2009)
- Charlie O'Connell (1975– )
- Jerry O'Connell (1974– )
- Chris O'Donnell (1970– )
- Jason O'Mara (1972– ), dual Irish and American citizen
- Heather O'Rourke (1975–1988)
- Ana Ortiz (1971– )
- Monica Potter (1971– )
- Maggie Q (1979– )
- Zachary Quinto (1977– )
- Jeremy Renner (1971– )
- Ryan Reynolds (1976– )
- Robin Tunney (1972– )
- Erik Valdez (1979– )
- Vince Vaughn (1970– )
- Mark Wahlberg (1971– )
- Paul Walker (1973–2013)
- Luke Wilson (1971– )

=== 1960s ===
- Jennifer Aniston (1969– )
- Daniel Baldwin (1960– )
- Stephen Baldwin (1966– )
- William Baldwin (1963– )
- Jennifer Beals (1963– )
- Matthew Broderick (1962– )
- Edward Burns (1968– )
- Dean Cain (1966– )
- Mariah Carey (1969– )
- Jim Carrey (1962– )
- James Caviezel (1968– )
- George Clooney (1961– )
- Stephen Colbert (1964– )
- Tom Cruise (1962– )
- John Cusack (1966– )
- Kim Delaney (1961– )
- Patrick Dempsey (1966– )
- Johnny Depp (1963– )
- Matt Dillon (1964– )
- Robert Downey Jr. (1965– )
- Karen Duffy (1962– )
- Emilio Estevez (1962– )
- Ramon Estevez (1963– )
- Renée Estevez (1967– )
- Chris Farley (1964–1997)
- Will Ferrell (1967– )
- Neil Flynn (1960– )
- Jorja Fox (1968– )
- Brendan Fraser (1968– )
- Janeane Garofalo (1964– )
- Paul Giamatti (1967– )
- Lauren Graham (1967– )
- Kathy Griffin (1960– )
- Anthony Michael Hall (1968– )
- Bonnie Hunt (1961– )
- Moira Kelly (1968– )
- Matthew McConaughey (1969– )
- Dylan McDermott (1961– )
- Neal McDonough (1966– )
- Dermot Mulroney (1963– )
- Conan O'Brien (1963– )
- Rosie O'Donnell (1962– )
- Mike O'Malley (1966– )
- Tatum O’Neal (1963– )
- Chris Penn (1965–2006)
- Sean Penn (1960– )
- Ellen Pompeo (1969– )
- John C. Reilly (1965– )
- Julia Roberts (1967– )
- Molly Shannon (1964– )
- Charlie Sheen (1965– )
- Ben Stiller (1965– )
- Courtney Thorne-Smith (1967– )
- Maura Tierney (1965– )
- Donnie Wahlberg (1969– )
- Andrew Wilson (1964– )
- Owen Wilson (1968– )
- Dean Winters (1964– )
- Scott William Winters (1965– )

=== 1950s ===
- Alec Baldwin (1958– )
- Pierce Brosnan (1953– ), dual Irish and American citizen
- Steve Buscemi (1957– )
- Lynda Carter (1951– )
- David Caruso (1956– )
- Dana Carvey (1955– )
- Lenny Clarke (1953– )
- Kevin Conroy (1955–2022)
- Kevin Costner (1955– )
- Dana Delany (1956– )
- Bo Derek (1956– )
- Ann Dowd (1956– )
- Jeff Fahey (1952– )
- Peter Gallagher (1955– )
- Mel Gibson (1956– ), dual Irish and American citizen
- Patricia Heaton (1958– )
- Marg Helgenberger (1958– )
- Nathan Lane (1956– )
- Denis Leary (1957– ), dual Irish and American citizen
- Bill Maher (1956– )
- James McCaffrey (1958–2023)
- Mary McDonnell (1952– )
- John C. McGinley (1959– )
- Kate Mulgrew (1955– )
- Bill Murray (1950– )
- Liam Neeson (1952– ), dual Irish and American citizen
- Michael O'Keefe (1955– )
- Terry O'Quinn (1952– )
- Aidan Quinn (1959– )
- Colin Quinn (1959– )
- Mickey Rourke (1952– )
- John Sayles (1950– )
- Ray Sharkey (1952–1993)
- Julia Sweeney (1959– )
- John Travolta (1954– )

=== 1940s ===
- Tanya Roberts (1949–2021)
- Armand Assante (1949– )
- Tom Berenger (1949– )
- Bud Cort (1948–2026)
- Patrick Cronin (1941– )
- Robert De Niro (1943– )
- Patrick Duffy (1949– )
- Patty Duke (1946–2016)
- Joe Estevez (1946– )
- Mia Farrow (1945– )
- Harrison Ford (1942– )
- Teri Garr (1944–2024)
- Dennis Holahan (1942– )
- Diane Keaton (1946–2025)
- Kevin Kline (1947– )
- Liza Minnelli (1946– )
- Michael Moriarty (1941– )
- Ryan O'Neal (1941–2023)
- Ed O'Neill (1946– )
- Susan Sarandon (1946– )
- Martin Sheen (1940– ), dual Irish and American citizen
- Suzanne Somers (1946–2023)
- Meryl Streep (1949– )

=== 1930s ===
- Stephen Boyd (1931–1977)
- Peter Boyle (1935–2006)
- Eileen Brennan (1932–2013)
- Ellen Burstyn (1932– )
- George Carlin (1937–2008)
- Tim Conway (1933–2019)
- Brian Dennehy (1938–2020)
- Clint Eastwood (1930– )
- Mike Farrell (1939– )
- Joan Hackett (1934–1983)
- James Earl Jones (1931–2024)
- Malachy McCourt (1931–2024)
- Jason Miller (1939–2001)
- Michael Murphy (1938– )
- Jack Nicholson (1937– )
- Bryan O'Byrne (1931–2009)
- Elvis Presley (1935–1977)
- Robert Redford (1936–2025)
- Roy Scheider (1932–2008)

=== 1920s ===
- Steve Allen (1921–2000)
- Marlon Brando (1924–2004)
- Jack Cassidy (1927–1976)
- Timothy Carey (1929–1994)
- Rosemary Clooney (1928–2002)
- Charles Durning (1923–2012)
- Judy Garland (1922–1969)
- Grace Kelly (1929–1982)
- Jack Kelly (1927–1992)
- Tommy Kelly (1925–2016)
- Jack Lord (1920–1998)
- Theo Marcuse (1920–1967)
- Patrick McGoohan (1928–2009).
- Anne Meara (1929–2015)
- Dickie Moore (1925–2015)
- Audie Murphy (1925–1971)
- Carroll O'Connor (1924–2001)
- Donald O'Connor (1925–2003)
- Maureen O'Hara (1920–2015), dual Irish and American citizen
- Eileen Ryan (1927–2022)
- Maureen Stapleton (1925–2006)
- Gene Tierney (1920–1991)

=== 1910s ===
- Lucille Ball (1911–1989)
- Art Carney (1918–2003)
- Geraldine Fitzgerald (1913–2005)
- Jackie Gleason (1916–1987)
- Susan Hayward (1917–1975)
- Rita Hayworth (1918–1987)
- Gene Kelly (1912–1996)
- Dorothy Lamour (1914–1996)
- Burt Lancaster (1913–1994)
- Robert Mitchum (1917–1997)
- Edmond O'Brien (1915–1985)
- Virginia O'Brien (1919–2001)
- Maureen O'Sullivan (1911–1998), born in Ireland, naturalized US citizen
- Gregory Peck (1916–2003)
- Tyrone Power (1914–1958)
- Anthony Quinn (1915–2001)
- Ronald Reagan (1911–2004)

=== 1900s ===
- Don Ameche (1908–1993)
- George Brent (1904–1979), born in Ireland, naturalized US citizen
- Lon Chaney Jr. (1906–1973)
- Joan Crawford (1903–1977)
- Bing Crosby (1903–1977)
- Brian Donlevy (1901–1972)
- James Dunn (1905–1967)
- Errol Flynn (1909–1959)
- Greer Garson (1904–1996)
- Helen Hayes (1900–1993)
- John Huston (1906–1987), renounced American citizenship and took up Irish citizenship in 1964
- Lloyd Nolan (1902–1985)
- Irene Ryan (1902–1973)
- Spencer Tracy (1900–1967)
- John Wayne (1907–1979)
- Robert Young (1907–1998)

== 19th century ==
=== 1890s ===
- Gracie Allen (1895–1964)
- Walter Brennan (1894–1974)
- James Cagney (1899–1986)
- Buster Keaton (1895–1966)
- Charles Laughton (1899–1962)
- Thomas Mitchell (1892–1962)
- Pat O'Brien (1899–1983)

=== 1880s ===
- Lon Chaney (1883–1930)
- William S. Hart (1884–1946)
- Walter Huston (1884–1950)

=== 1870s ===
- Sara Allgood (1879–1950), dual Irish and American citizen
- George M. Cohan (1878–1942)
- John J. Cooke (actor) (1874–1921), American actor of the silent era

=== 1850s ===
- Eddie Foy (1856–1928)

=== 1830s ===
- William E. Sheridan (1839–1887)

=== 1820s ===
- Barney Williams (1824–1876)
