= List of Chhattisgarhi film actors =

List of Chhattisgari film actors

This is a list of actors from Chhattisgarhi cinema.

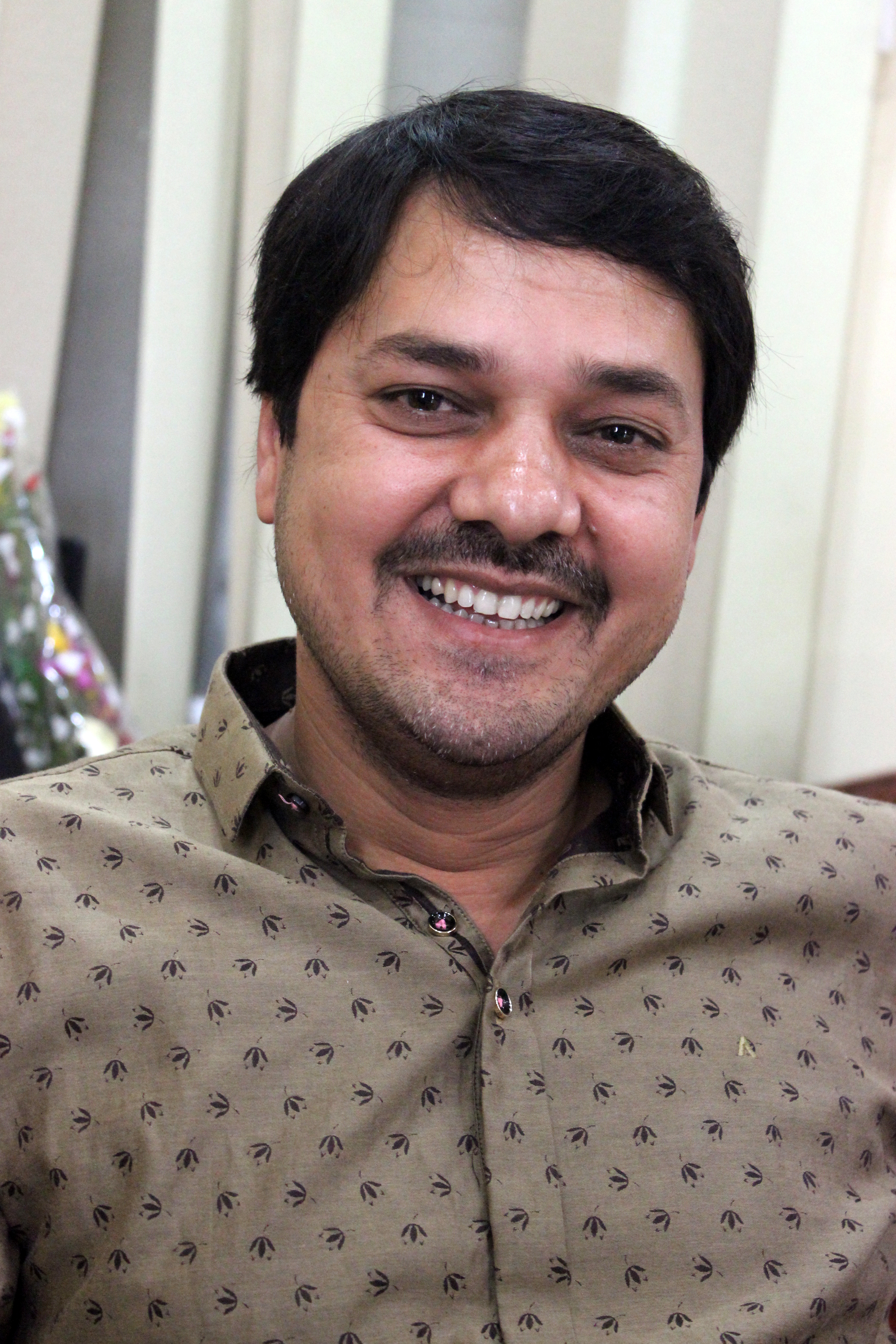
Popular actor in Chhattisgarh

== A ==
- Aashay Mishra
- Anuj Sharma
- Anurag Basu
- Avinash Mishra

== G ==
- Govind Ram Nirmalkar

== H ==
- Habib Tanvir

== K ==
- Kishore Sahu

== N ==
- Nitin Dubey

== O ==
- Omkar Das Manikpuri

== P ==
- Pooran Kiri
- Punaram Nishad

== S ==
- Sandit Tiwari
- Satyajeet Dubey
