= David Tulloch =

David L. Tulloch
- Education: University of Wisconsin–Madison
- Scientific career
- Workplaces: Rutgers University

David L. Tulloch is a professor of Landscape Architecture at Rutgers University. He is known for his research and involvement with PPGIS and Institutional GIS. Dr. Tulloch maintains the high-profile blog, Places and Spaces He is not related to Bitsie Tulloch.
