= Delphine Ouattara =

Burkinabé actress (born 1967)

Delphine Ouattara (born 29 April 1967), also known as Mamouta, is a Burkinabé actress.

== Biography ==
Ouattara was born on 29 April 1967 in Tougan, Burkina Faso. She is best known for her role in television series Vis-à-vis (1993). Ouattara began appearing in cinema in 1994. She was named best actress in the country by Nuit des Sotigui. She is also known as Mamouta, a name of a character she has played in Vis-à-vis. She is a feminist.

== Filmography ==
- Vis-à-vis (1993)
- Siraba (2000)
- Gorel (2001)
- Tassuma (2002)
- Ouaga Saga (2002)
- Traque à Ouaga (2004)
- Sofia (2004)
- Dossier brûlant (2005)
- Code phénix (2005)
- L'or des Younga (2006)
