= Roukiata Ouedraogo =

Burkina Faso actress (born 1979)

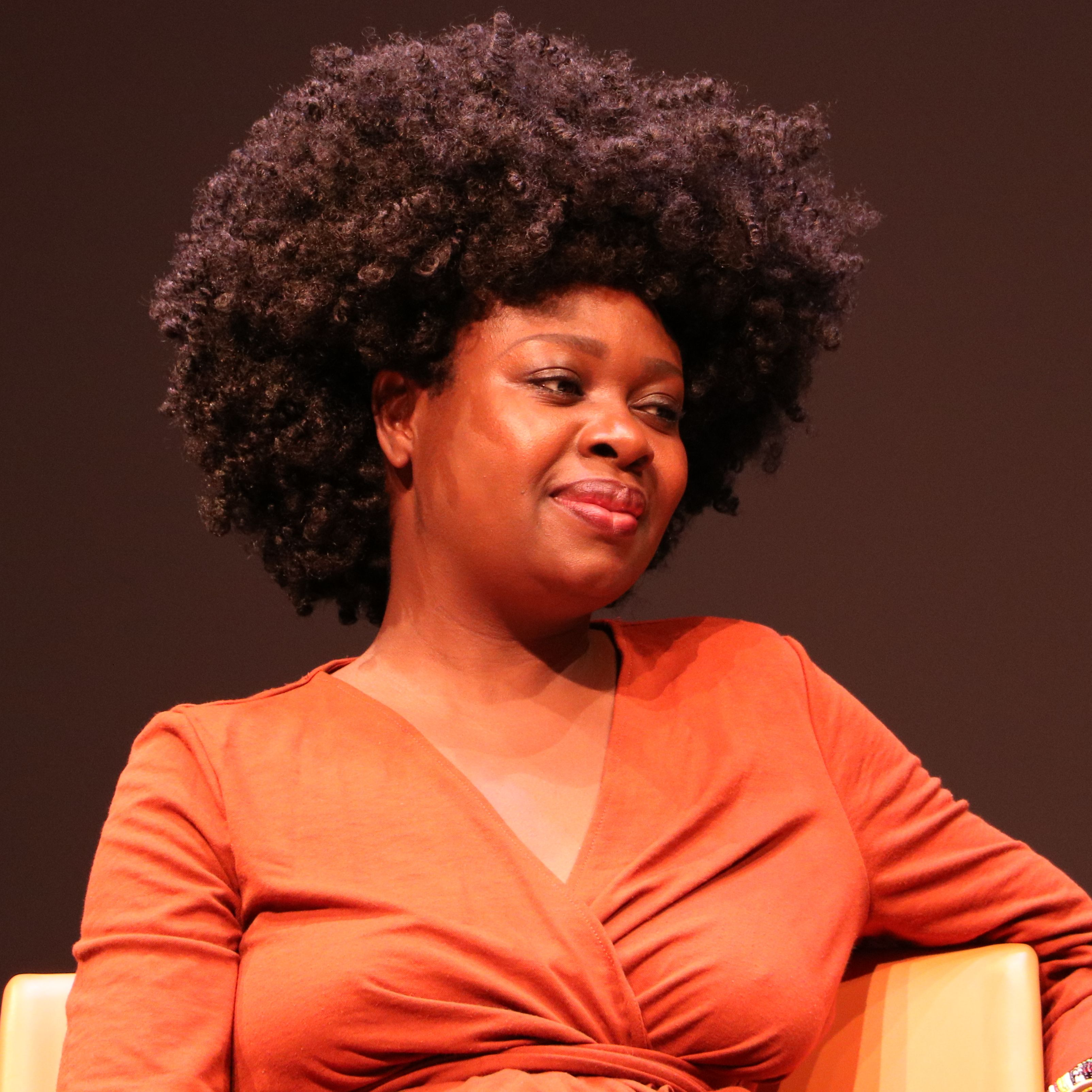
- Ouedraogo in 2021
- Born: 1979 (age 46–47); Burkina Faso
- Occupations: Playwright, actress, and comedian
- Spouse: Stéphane Eliard

Roukiata Ouedraogo (born 1979) is a Burkinabé playwright, actress and comedian.

== Biography ==
She grew up in Fada N'Gourma, the daughter of a civil servant. Her father had been involved in the local theater scene and was a friend and soccer teammates with noted actor Sotigui Kouyaté. Her uncle is the Mossi chief of Soumiaga. At a young age, Ouedraogo moved to Ouagadougou to continue her education. In high school, she joined her local theater troupe and toured the country. To earn some money, she opened a small hairdressing salon near her home and designed clothes. After receiving her baccalaureate, Ouedraogo moved to Paris in 2000, where her older brother was living. She had several odd jobs, and was fired as a cashier at a mini-market because she confused francs with CFA francs.

She worked as a make-up artist and model for several years. In 2007, Ouedraogo decided to focus her attention on the theatre and was accepted to Cours Florent after an audition. As part of her classwork, she wrote and directed her first play, Yennenga, the epic of the Mossé. After an enthusiastic reception from her instructors, the play was first staged at the Comédie de la Passerelle theater in 2008. It is based on one of the founding myths in Burkina Faso, and Ouedraogo played the starring role of an 11th-century princess. According to her, writing the play helped her deal with the grief of losing her father and brother.

In September 2010, her play was first performed at the Gambidi cultural center in Ouagadougou, and was covered on national television. The presence of her uncle at the showing was a sign of approval for a career path that can be discouraged for someone of aristocratic ancestry like Ouedraogo. The play was reimagined as a musical comedy, with eight dancers and two musicians. In April 2011, Ouedraogo staged a production of the play to support the NGO Fitima, which supports disabled children. She collaborated on the show Article 13 named after the UN Declaration of Human Rights, which was performed in 2012 at several street theatre shows in France. In 2013, she created the autobiographical one-woman show Ouagadougou pressé, on the topic of her immigration to France.

Ouedraogo made her film debut in September 2013, in the short film Marie et les gargouilles. She appeared in the 2014 movie Samba. The same year, Ouedraogo was approached by Dani Kouyaté to star in the docufiction series L'Amour en cage. In 2015, she starred in her play Roukiata tombe le masque, a comedy about her circumcision. She appeared in the show Le Parlement du rire on Canal+. In April 2017, Ouedraogo began writing a column on France Inter. In 2018, she acted in Je demande la route, which premiered in the Festival Off d'Avignon.

Ouedraogo is married to Stéphane Eliard, a film director. She speaks both French and Bambara.
