= List of cast members of the A Nightmare on Elm Street film series =

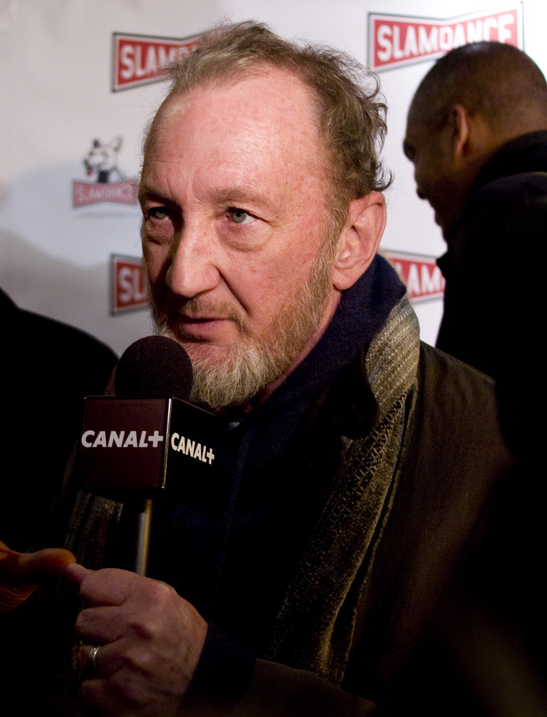
Robert Englund portrayed Freddy Krueger throughout the first eight films of the series.

This is a list of cast members of the A Nightmare on Elm Street film series. The film series began in 1984 with the release of the first film A Nightmare on Elm Street which was directed and written by Wes Craven. Although Craven disliked the idea of sequels, he returned to co-write the third film, A Nightmare on Elm Street 3: Dream Warriors (1987) and to write and direct the seventh film, Wes Craven's New Nightmare (1994). The main character of the films, Freddy Krueger appeared throughout the entire franchise portrayed by Robert Englund, until the remake (2010), when the character was portrayed by Jackie Earle Haley, who auditioned for the role of Glen Lantz in the original. Rooney Mara takes the role of Nancy Thompson, a character portrayed by Heather Langenkamp in the first, third and seventh films.

== Cast ==
List indicators

This section includes characters who will appear or have appeared in more than two films in the series.

- An empty grey cell indicates the character was not in the film, or that the character's official presence has not yet been confirmed.
- ^{A} indicates an appearance through archival footage or audio.
- ^{C} indicates a cameo role.
- ^{Y} indicates a younger version of the character.

Character	Original series						Standalone film	Crossover	Remake
Character	A Nightmare on Elm Street	A Nightmare on Elm Street 2: Freddy's Revenge	A Nightmare on Elm Street 3: Dream Warriors	A Nightmare on Elm Street 4: Dream Master	A Nightmare on Elm Street 5: Dream Child	Freddy's Dead: The Final Nightmare	Wes Craven's New Nightmare	Freddy vs. Jason	A Nightmare on Elm Street
Character	1984	1985	1987	1988	1989	1991	1994	2003	2010
=== Principal characters ===
Freddy Krueger	Robert Englund	Robert Englund	Robert Englund	Robert Englund	Robert Englund	Robert Englund Tobe Sexton^{T} Chase Schrimer^{Y}	Robert Englund	Robert Englund	Jackie Earle Haley
Nancy Thompson	Heather Langenkamp	Mentioned	Heather Langenkamp				Heather Langenkamp	Flashback	Rooney Mara Kyra Krumins^{Y}
Donald "Don" Thompson	John Saxon		John Saxon				John Saxon		
Marge Thompson	Ronee Blakley		Mentioned						Connie Britton
Glen Lantz	Johnny Depp	Mentioned				Johnny Depp^{C}	Mentioned		Kyle Gallner
Christina "Tina" Gray	Amanda Wyss	Mentioned					Amanda Wyss^{A}	Flashback	Katie Cassidy Julianna Damm^{Y}
Rod Lane	Nick Corri						Nick Corri		Kellan Lutz Max Holt^{Y}
Jesse Walsh		Mark Patton						Flashback	
Lisa Webber		Kim Myers							
Ron Grady		Robert Rusler							
Kerry Hellman		Sydney Walsh							
Coach Schneider		Marshall Bell							
Dr. Neil Gordon			Craig Wasson						
Kristen Parker			Patricia Arquette	Tuesday Knight				Flashback	
Joseph "Joey" Crusel			Rodney Eastman	Rodney Eastman				Flashback	
Roland Kincaid			Ken Sagoes	Ken Sagoes				Flashback	
Jennifer Caulfield			Penelope Sudrow						
Phillip Anderson			Bradley Gregg						
Taryn White			Jennifer Rubin						
Will Stanton			Ira Heiden						
Amanda Krueger Sister Mary Helena			Nan Martin		Beatrice Boepple				
Alice Johnson				Lisa Wilcox Kristen Clayton^{Y}	Lisa Wilcox			Flashback	
Daniel "Dan" Jordan				Danny Hassel	Danny Hassel				
Rick Johnson				Andras Jones					
Debbie Stevens				Brooke Theiss					
Sheila Kopecky				Toy Newkirk					
Dennis Johnson				Nicholas Mele	Nicholas Mele				
Jacob Johnson					Whit Hertford				
Yvonne Miller					Kelly Jo Minter				
Greta Gibson					Erika Anderson				
Mark Gray					Joe Seely				
Margaret "Maggie" Burroughs Katherine Krueger						Lisa Zane Cassandra Rachel Freil^{Y}			
John Doe						Shon Greenblatt			
Tracy Swan						Lezlie Deane			
Doc						Yaphet Kotto			
Carlos Rodriguez						Ricky Dean Logan			
Spencer Lewis						Breckin Meyer			
Dylan Porter							Miko Hughes		
Julie							Tracy Middendorf		
Chase Porter							David Newsom		
Jason Voorhees								Ken Kirzinger Spencer Stump^{Y}	
Lori Campbell								Monica Keena	
Will Rollins								Jason Ritter	
Kia Waterson								Kelly Rowland	
Charlie Linderman								Chris Marquette	
Mark Davis								Brendan Fletcher	
Gibb Smith								Katharine Isabelle	
Deputy Scott Stubbs								Lochlyn Munro	
Jess Braun									Thomas Dekker Bayden Coyer^{Y}
=== Minor characters ===
Dr. King	Charles Fleischer								
Sergeant Parker	Joseph Whipp								
Teacher	Lin Shaye								
Ken Walsh		Clu Gulager							
Cheryl Walsh		Hope Lange							
Mrs. Webber		Melinda O. Fee							
Mr. Webber		Tom McFadden							
Angela Walsh		Christie Clark							
Elaine Parker			Brooke Bundy	Brooke Bundy					
Dr. Carver			Paul Kent						
Elizabeth Simms			Priscilla Pointer						
Lorenzo			Clayton Landey						
Max			Laurence Fishburne						
Wally George					Wally George				
Mr. Gray					Clarence Felder				
Woman at orphanage						Elinor Donahue			
Nurse with Pills							Lin Shaye		
Dr. Christine Heffner							Fran Bennett		
Bill Freeburg								Kyle Labine	
Shack								Chris Gauthier	
Alan Smith									Clancy Brown
Nora Fowler									Lia Mortensen

== See also ==
- List of characters in the Nightmare on Elm Street series
