= Nina Crulicovschi =

Nina Crulicovschi (born September 24, 1951) is an easy listening singer from Moldova.

She was born in a family of deported Moldovans, in the Kurgan Oblast of the Russian Soviet Federative Socialist Republic. After returning in Moldova, she studied at the "Ștefan Neaga" secondary music school in Chișinău (1968–1972), where she was a student of Loghin Țurcanu.

Nina worked in many music bands and orchestras, including: "Fluieraș" (1973–1975) and "Lăutarii" (1975–1976) orchestras, "Orizont" (1977–1979), "Bucuria" (1979–1982), and "Contemporanul" (1983–1989) bands of the National Philharmonic of Moldova. She recorded easy listening songs at Radio Moldova. Her discography includes:

- Steaua polară
- Steaua iubirii
- Laudă soarelui
- Te aștept
- Of, leliță Mărioară
- Nu mă plânge, bade
- Strigături moldovenești

Nina was also an actress, starring, among others, in Chipul tău (Telefilm-Chișinău, 1984). Since 1997, she works at the "Al. Davilla" Theatre in Bucharest.

Nina Crulicovschi took part at the 1981 "Zorii Crimeei" Festival, and received the "Master of Arts" order in 1993. She is married with no children.

== Bibliography ==
- Buzilă, Serafim; Colesnic, Iurie (2000). Femei din Moldova: enciclopedie. Museum. p. 85.
