= List of Luxembourg film actors =

A list of notable film actors from Luxembourg:

== B ==
- Marc Baum (b. 1978)

== D ==
- Germaine Damar (b. 1929)
- René Deltgen (1909–1979)

== G ==
- Pol Greisch (1930–2026)

== J ==
- André Jung (1953)

== K ==
- Vicky Krieps (b. 1983)

== M ==
- Myriam Muller (b. 1971)

== N ==
- Désirée Nosbusch (b. 1965)

== V ==
- Thierry van Werveke (1958–2009)
