= Awa Traoré =

Malian actress, filmmaker

- أوا تراوري
- Born: Mali
- Occupations: Actress and filmmaker
- Years active: 1995–present

Awa Traoré (Arabic: أوا تراوري), is a Malian filmmaker and film actress. Apart from direction, Traoré is also an assistant director, composer and writer.

== Career ==
Traoré started her career with 1995 film L'enfant noir. Then she acted as the 'huntress' in the 1993 short film Denko directed by Mohamed Camara. The film received critical acclaim and won the Grand Prix at the Clermont-Ferrand International Short Film Festival, the award for Best Short film at the Fribourg International Film Festival and the Golden Danzante award at the Huesca Film Festival.

== Filmography ==
Year	Film	Role	Genre	Ref.
1995	L'enfant noir	Actress: La chasseresse	Feature film	
1993	Denko	Actress: The huntress	Short film	
2011	Une journée avec	Director, writer	TV series documentary	
2011	Correspondances	Assistant director	Documentary	
2009	Notre pain capital	Composer	Documentary short film	
