= List of Planet of the Apes film actors =

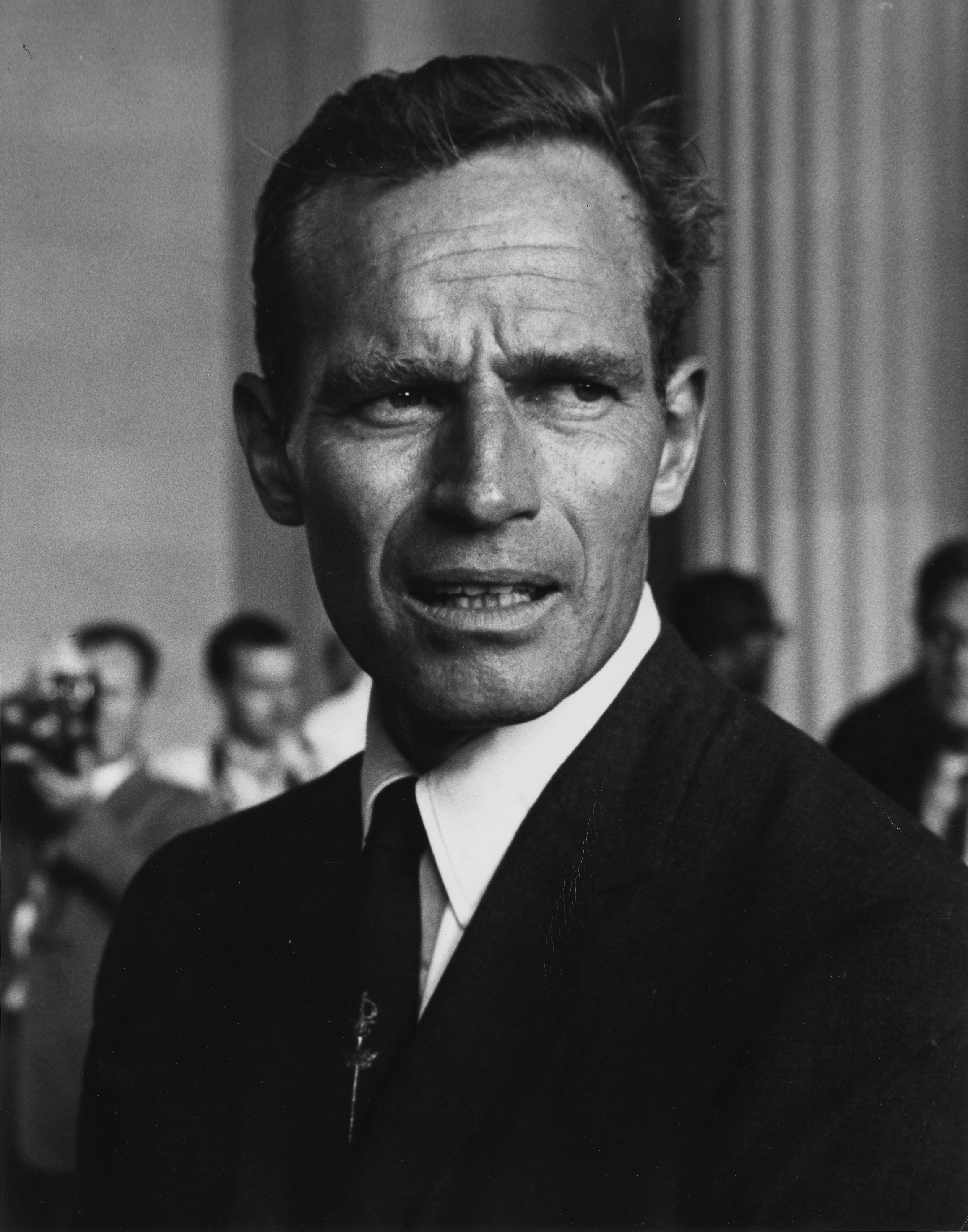
Charlton Heston

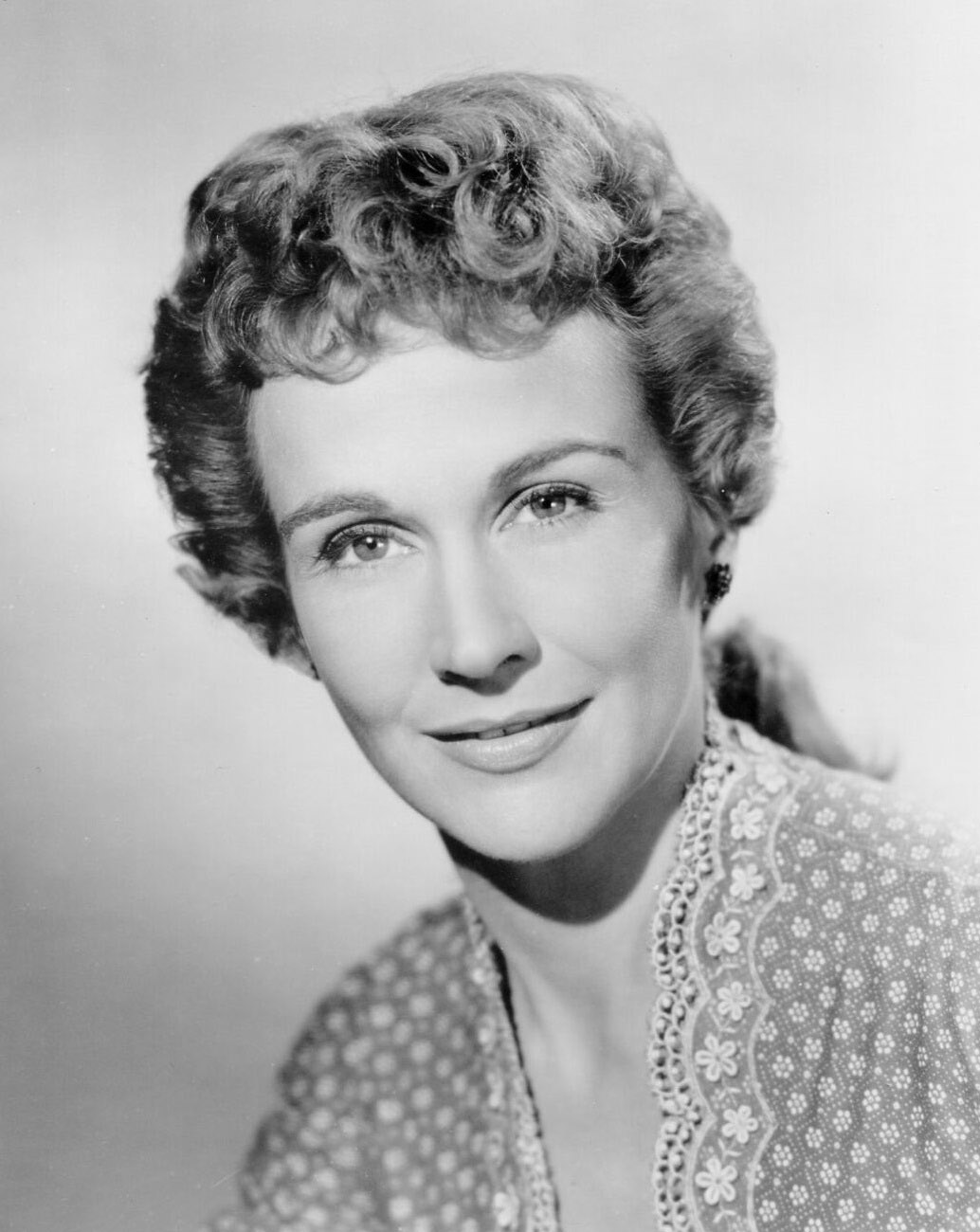
Kim Hunter

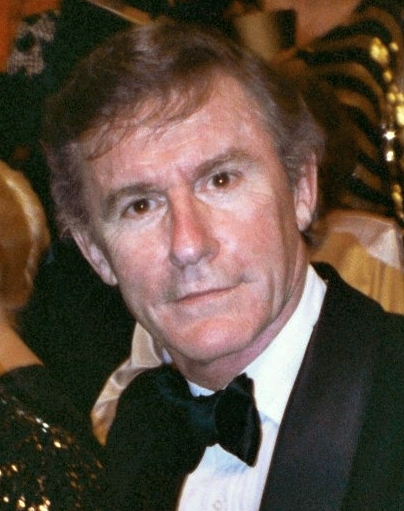
Roddy McDowall

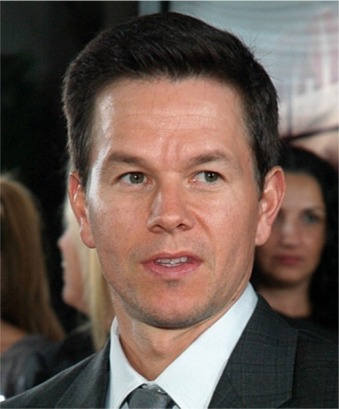
Mark Wahlberg

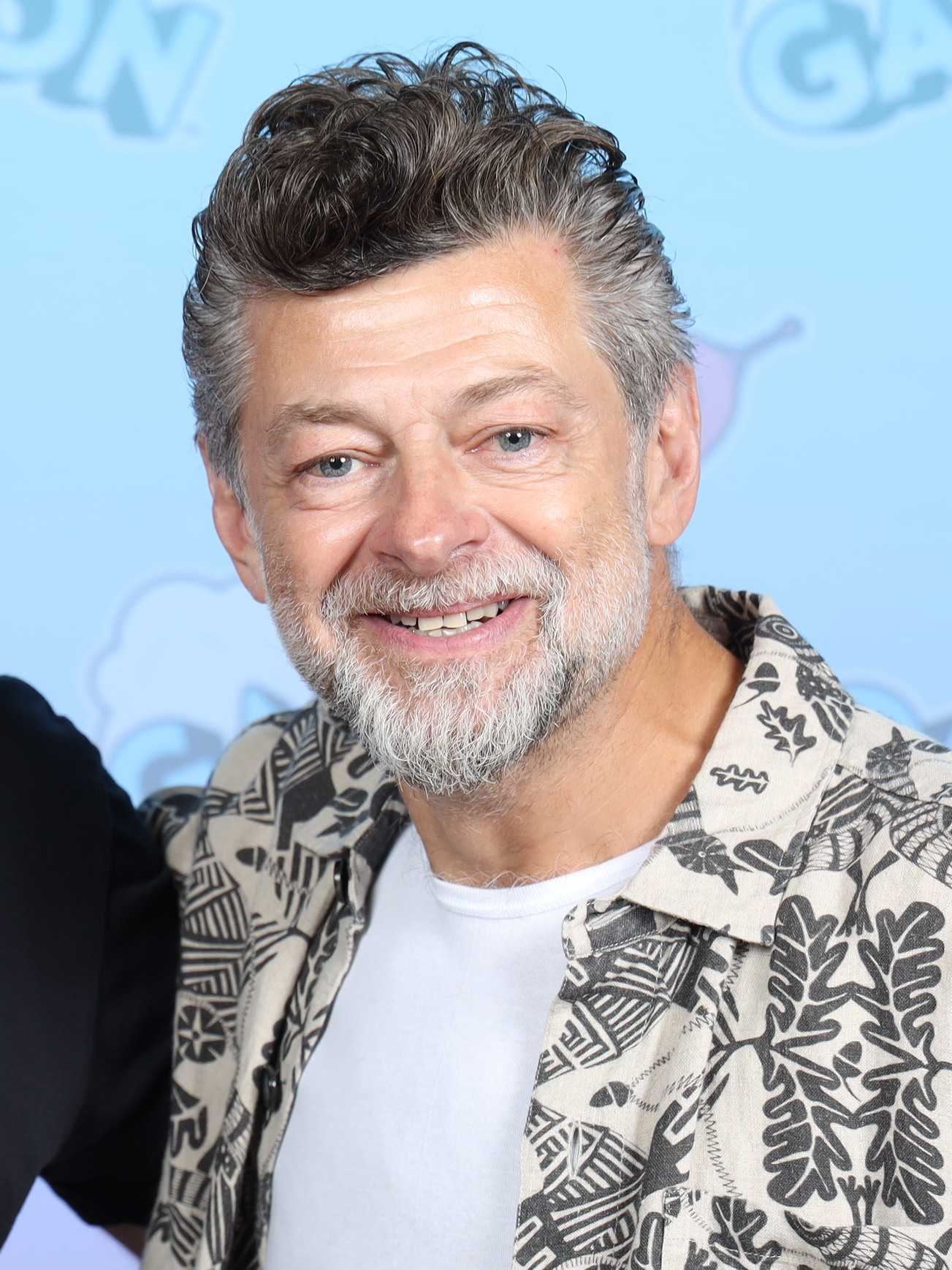
Andy Serkis

Heston is the protagonist of the first film, while Hunter appears in the first three films. McDowall stars in four of the five original films. Wahlberg is the protagonist of the 2001 remake, while Serkis is the main character in the reboot series' first three films.

Planet of the Apes is an American science fiction media franchise about a world in which humans and intelligent apes clash for control. The franchise is based on French author Pierre Boulle's 1963 novel La Planète des singes, translated into English as Planet of the Apes or Monkey Planet. Its 1968 film adaptation, Planet of the Apes, was a critical and commercial hit, initiating a series of sequels, tie-ins, and derivative works.

Four sequels followed the original film: Beneath the Planet of the Apes (1970), Escape from the Planet of the Apes (1971), Conquest of the Planet of the Apes (1972), and Battle for the Planet of the Apes (1973). Planet of the Apes was headlined by Charlton Heston as George Taylor, along Roddy McDowall and Kim Hunter as Cornelius and Zira. Heston returned for the second film, as well as Hunter, while McDowall was replaced by David Watson. Both McDowall and Hunter reprised their respective roles in Escape from the Planet of the Apes, while McDowall starred as a different character, Caesar, in the fourth and fifth films. A remake was released in 2001, starring Mark Wahlberg as Leo Davidson, with Tim Roth as General Thade and Helena Bonham Carter as Ari.

A reboot film series commenced in 2011 with Rise of the Planet of the Apes, starring James Franco as Will Rodman and Andy Serkis as Caesar. It was followed by Dawn of the Planet of the Apes (2014) and War for the Planet of the Apes (2017), both also starring Serkis. A fourth film, Kingdom of the Planet of the Apes, starring Owen Teague as Noa, was released in 2024.

== Original series ==
List indicators

This section includes characters who have appeared in the original series.

- An empty grey cell indicates the character was not in the film.
- ^{A} indicates an appearance through archival footage or audio.
- ^{P} indicates an appearance in onscreen photographs.
- ^{V} indicates a voice-only role.

Character
Character	Planet of the Apes	Beneath the Planet of the Apes	Escape from the Planet of the Apes	Conquest of the Planet of the Apes	Battle for the Planet of the Apes
Character	1968	1970	1971	1972	1973
=== Introduced in Planet of the Apes ===
Dr. Cornelius	Roddy McDowall	David Watson	Roddy McDowall		Roddy McDowall^{A}
Dodge	Jeff Burton				
Dr. Honorious	James Daly				
Landon	Robert Gunner		Robert Gunner^{A}		
Lucius	Lou Wagner				
Dr. Maximus	Woodrow Parfrey				
Nova	Linda Harrison	Linda Harrison			
President of the Assembly	James Whitmore				
Stewart	Dianne Stanley				
George Taylor	Charlton Heston	Charlton Heston	Charlton Heston^{A}		
Dr. Zaius	Maurice Evans	Maurice Evans			
Dr. Zira	Kim Hunter	Kim Hunter	Kim Hunter		Kim Hunter^{A}
=== Introduced in Beneath the Planet of the Apes ===
Albina		Natalie Trundy			
Brent		James Franciscus			
Caspay		Jeff Corey			
Fat Man		Victor Buono			
Mendez		Paul Richards			
Minister		Thomas Gomez			
Negro		Don Pedro Colley			
General Ursus		James Gregory			
Verger		Gregory Sierra			
Skipper		Tod Andrews			
=== Introduced in Escape from the Planet of the Apes ===
Armando			Ricardo Montalbán	Ricardo Montalbán	
Dr. Stephanie "Stevie" Branton			Natalie Trundy		
Caesar			Walker Edmiston^{V}	Roddy McDowall	Roddy McDowall
Dr. Lewis Dixon			Bradford Dillman		
Dr. Otto Hasslein			Eric Braeden		Eric Braeden^{A}
Dr. Milo			Sal Mineo		
=== Introduced in Conquest of the Planet of the Apes ===
Governor Breck				Don Murray	
Kolp				Severn Darden	Severn Darden
Lisa				Natalie Trundy	Natalie Trundy
MacDonald				Hari Rhodes	
=== Introduced in Battle for the Planet of the Apes ===
Abe the Teacher					Noah Keen
General Aldo					Claude Akins
Alma					France Nuyen
Cornelius II					Bobby Porter
The Lawgiver					John Huston
MacDonald					Austin Stoker
Mandemus					Lew Ayres
Mendez					Paul Stevens
Virgil					Paul Williams

== Remake ==
List indicators

This section includes characters who have appeared in the 2001 remake.

- An empty grey cell indicates the character was not in the film.
- ^{C} indicates a cameo role.

Character	Planet of the Apes
Character	2001
Ari	Helena Bonham Carter
Colonel Attar	Michael Clarke Duncan
Daena	Estella Warren
Leo Davidson	Mark Wahlberg
Karubi	Kris Kristofferson
General Krull	Cary-Hiroyuki Tagawa
Limbo	Paul Giamatti
Senator Nado	Glenn Shadix
Nova	Lisa Marie
Senator Sandar	David Warner
General Thade	Tim Roth
Dr. Zaius	Charlton Heston^{C}

== Reboot series ==
List indicators

This section includes characters who will appear or have appeared in the reboot series.

- An empty grey cell indicates the character was not in the film, or that the character's official presence has not yet been confirmed.
- ^{C} indicates a cameo role.
- ^{S} indicates an appearance through use of special effects.
- ^{U} indicates an uncredited appearance.

Character
Character	Rise of the Planet of the Apes	Dawn of the Planet of the Apes	War for the Planet of the Apes	Kingdom of the Planet of the Apes
Character	2011	2014	2017	2024
=== Introduced in Rise of the Planet of the Apes ===
Caroline Aranha	Freida Pinto			
Caesar	Andy Serkis	Andy Serkis	Andy Serkis	^{S}
Cornelia	Devyn Dalton	Judy Greer	Judy Greer	
Robert Franklin	Tyler Labine			
Hunsiker	David Hewlett			
Steven Jacobs	David Oyelowo			
Koba	Christopher Gordon	Toby Kebbell	Toby Kebbell	
Dodge Landon	Tom Felton			
John Landon	Brian Cox			
Maurice	Karin Konoval	Karin Konoval	Karin Konoval	Karin Konoval^{C}
Rocket	Terry Notary	Terry Notary	Terry Notary	^{S}
Charles Rodman	John Lithgow			
Will Rodman	James Franco	James Franco^{C}		
=== Introduced in Dawn of the Planet of the Apes ===
Alexander		Kodi Smit-McPhee		
Ash		Doc Shaw		
Blue Eyes		Nick Thurston	Max Lloyd-Jones	
Carver		Kirk Acevedo		
Cornelius		^{S}	Devyn Dalton	^{S}
Dreyfus		Gary Oldman		
Ellie		Keri Russell		
Luca		Scott Lang	Michael Adamthwaite	
Malcolm		Jason Clarke		
McVeigh		Kevin Rankin		
Werner		Jocko Sims		
=== Introduced in War for the Planet of the Apes ===
Bad Ape			Steve Zahn	
Boyle			Chad Rook	
Lake			Sara Canning	^{S}
Colonel J. Wesley McCullough			Woody Harrelson	
Nova			Amiah Miller	
Preacher			Gabriel Chavarria	
Red			Ty Olsson	
Winter			Aleks Paunovic	
=== Introduced in Kingdom of the Planet of the Apes ===
Anaya				Travis Jeffery
Proximus Caesar				Kevin Durand
Dar				Sara Wiseman
Koro				Neil Sandilands
Korina				Dichen Lachman
Lightning				Ras-Samuel Weld A'abzgi
Mae / Nova				Freya Allan
Noa				Owen Teague
Raka				Peter Macon
Soona				Lydia Peckham
Sylva				Eka Darville
Trevathan				William H. Macy
