= 5th Youth in Film Awards =

1983 US media awards ceremony

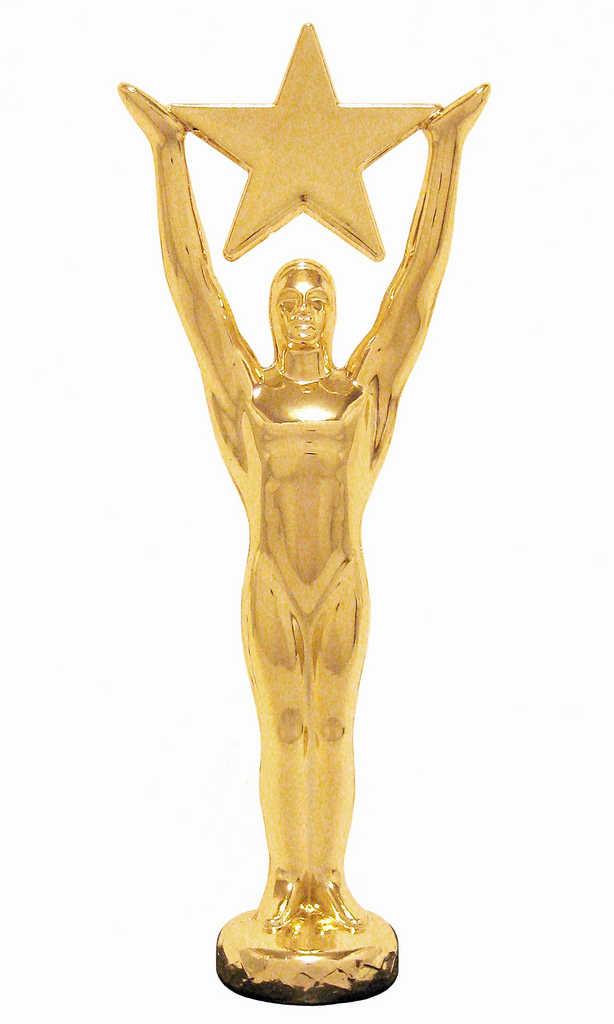
- Awarded for: Achievement in the 1982—1983 season
- Date: December 4, 1983
- Site: Beverly Hilton Hotel; Beverly Hills, California
- Hosted by: Jason Bateman and River Phoenix

The 5th Youth in Film Awards ceremony (now known as the Young Artist Awards), presented by the Youth in Film Association, honored outstanding youth performers under the age of 21 in the fields of film, television and theater for the 1982–1983 season, and took place on December 4, 1983, at the Beverly Hilton Hotel in Beverly Hills, California.

Established in 1978 by long-standing Hollywood Foreign Press Association member, Maureen Dragone, the Youth in Film Association was the first organization to establish an awards ceremony specifically set to recognize and award the contributions of performers under the age of 18 in the fields of film, television, theater and music.

== Categories ==
★ Bold indicates the winner in each category.

== Best Young Performer in a Feature Film ==
=== Best Young Motion Picture Actor in a Feature Film ===
★ C. Thomas Howell - The Outsiders (Warner Bros) as Ponyboy Curtis

- Torquil Campbell - The Golden Seal (Samuel Goldwyn Co.) as Eric Lee
- Sebastian Dungan - Man, Woman and Child (Paramount) as Jean-Claude Guerin
- Frederick Koehler - Mr. Mom (20th Century Fox) as Alex Butler
- Kelly Reno - The Black Stallion Returns (M.G.M.) as Alec Ramsey

=== Best Young Motion Picture Actress in a Feature Film ===
★ Roxana Zal - Table for Five (Warner Bros) as Matilde "Tilde" Tannen

- Katherine Healy - Six Weeks (Universal) as Nicole Dreyfus
- Diane Lane - Rumble Fish (Universal) as Patty
- Ally Sheedy - WarGames (M.G.M.) as Jennifer Mack

=== Best Young Supporting Actor In a Motion Picture ===
★ Scott Schwartz - The Toy (Columbia) as "Master" Eric Bates

- Allan Hubbard - Tender Mercies (EMI) as Sonny
- Robby Kiger - Table for Five (Warner Bros) as Truman-Paul Tannen
- Jeremy Licht - Twilight Zone: The Movie (Warner Bros) as Anthony
- Danny Pintauro - Cujo (Warner Bros) as Tad Trenton

=== Best Young Supporting Actress In a Motion Picture ===
★ Missy Francis - Man, Woman and Child (Paramount) as Paula Beckwith

- Diane Lane - The Outsiders (Warner Bros) as Sherrie "Cherry" Valance
- Arlene McIntyre - Man, Woman and Child (Paramount) as Jessica Beckwith
- Christina Nigra - Twilight Zone: The Movie (Warner Bros) as Little Girl
- Dana Hill - Cross Creek (Universal) as Ellie Turner

== Best Young Performer in a Television Movie ==
=== Best Young Actor in a Movie Made for Television ===
★ Gary Coleman - The Kid with the 200 IQ (NBC) as Nick Newell

- Khalif Bobatoon - In Defense of the Kids (CBS) as Gordon
- David Faustino - Summer Girl (CBS) as Jason Shelburne
- Keith Coogan - Wrong Way Kid (CBS) as Chris
- Evan Richards - One Cooks, The Other Doesn't (CBS) as Benjamin Boone
- Demetri Thomas - Grandpa, Will You Run With Me? (NBC) as Self

=== Best Young Actress in a Movie Made for Television ===
★ Sydney Penny - The Thorn Birds (ABC) as Young Maggie Cleary

- Quinn Cummings - Grandpa, Will You Run with Me? (NBC) as Self - Sketch Performer
- Tracey Gold - ABC Afterschool Special - Hand Me Down Kid (ABC) as Ari Jacobs
- Katy Kurtzman - Allison Sidney Harrison (NBC) as Allison Sidney Harrison
- Kari Michaelsen - The Kid with the 200 IQ (NBC) as Julie Gordon
- Kyle Richards - This is Kate Bennett (ABC) as Jennifer Bennett

== Best Young Performer in a Television Series ==
=== Best Young Actor in a Drama Series ===
★ River Phoenix - Seven Brides For Seven Brothers (CBS) as Guthrie McFadden

- David Friedman - Little House on the Prairie: A New Beginning (NBC) as Jason Carter
- Timothy Gibbs - Father Murphy (NBC) as Will Adams
- Chris Hebert - Boone (NBC) as Norman
- John Kovacs - Second Family Tree (NBC) as Toby Benjamin
- Matthew Laborteaux - Little House on the Prairie: A New Beginning (NBC) as Albert Quinn Ingalls
- Scott Mellini - Father Murphy (NBC) as Ephram Winkler

=== Best Young Actress in a Drama Series ===
★ Melissa Gilbert - Little House on the Prairie: A New Beginning (NBC) as Laura Ingalls Wilder

- Allison Balson - Little House on the Prairie: A New Beginning (NBC) as Nancy Oleson
- Tonya Crowe - Knots Landing (CBS) as Olivia Cunningham Dyer
- Shannen Doherty - Little House on the Prairie: A New Beginning (NBC) as Jenny Wilder
- Melora Hardin - Second Family Tree (NBC) as Tess Benjamin
- Corin Nelson - Moving Right Along (PBS)
- Julie Anne Haddock - Boone (NBC) as Amanda
- Cynthia Gibb - Fame (Syndicated) as Holly Laird

=== Best Young Actor in a Comedy Series ===
★ Ricky Schroder - Silver Spoons (NBC) as Richard Bluthorn "Rick" or "Ricky" Stratton

- Jason Bateman - Silver Spoons (NBC) as Derek Taylor
- Todd Bridges - Diff'rent Strokes (NBC) as Willis Jackson
- Eric Brown - Mama's Family (NBC) as Vinton "Buzz" Harper Jr.
- Gary Coleman - Diff'rent Strokes (NBC) as Arnold Jackson
- Bobby Fite - Silver Spoons (NBC) as J.T. Martin
- Andre Gower - Baby Makes Five (NBC) as Michael Riddle
- Jeffrey Jaquet - Whiz Kids (CBS) as Jeremy Saldino
- Emmanuel Lewis - Webster (ABC) as Webster Long
- Keith Mitchell - Gun Shy (NBC) as Clovis
- Corky Pigeon - Silver Spoons (NBC) as Fredrick March "Freddy" Lippincottleman
- Marc Price - Family Ties (NBC) as Irwin "Skippy" Handelman
- Shavar Ross - Diff'rent Strokes (NBC) as Dudley Johnson
- Glenn Scarpelli - One Day at a Time (CBS) as Alex Handris

=== Best Young Actress in a Comedy Series ===
★ Missy Gold - Benson (ABC) as Katie Gatling

- Karin Argoud - Mama's Family (NBC) as Sonja Harper
- Bridgette Andersen - Gun Shy (NBC) as Celia
- Justine Bateman - Family Ties (NBC) as Mallory Keaton
- Danielle Brisebois - Archie Bunker's Place (CBS) as Stephanie Mills
- Mindy Cohn - The Facts of Life (NBC) as Natalie Green
- Kim Fields - The Facts of Life (NBC) as Dorothy "Tootie" Ramsey
- Lauri Hendler - Gimme a Break! (NBC) as Julie Kanisky Maxwell
- Sarah Jessica Parker - Square Pegs (CBS) as Patty Greene
- Nancy McKeon - The Facts of Life (NBC) as Jo Polniaczek
- Dana Plato - Diff'rent Strokes (NBC) as Kimberly Drummond
- Jill Whelan - The Love Boat (ABC) as Vicki Stubing
- Lisa Whelchel - The Facts of Life (NBC) as Blair Warner
- Tina Yothers - Family Ties (NBC) as Jennifer Keaton

=== Best Young Actor in a New Television Series ===
★ John P. Navin, Jr. - Jennifer Slept Here (NBC) as Joseph "Joey" Elliot

- Timothy Gibbs - The Rousters (NBC) as Michael Earp
- Billy Jacoby - It's Not Easy (ABC) as Matthew Townsend
- Matthew Laborteaux - Whiz Kids (CBS) as Richie Adler
- Todd Porter - Whiz Kids (CBS) as Hamilton "Ham" Parker
- Glenn Scarpelli - Jennifer Slept Here (NBC) as Marc

=== Best Young Actress in a New Television Series ===
★ Tracey Gold - Goodnight, Beantown (CBS) as Susan Barnes

- Melanie Gaffin - Whiz Kids (CBS) as Cheryl Adler
- Rachel Jacobs - It's Not Easy (ABC) as Carol Long
- Laura Jacoby - Mr. Smith (NBC) as Ellie Atwood
- Robyn Lively - Boone (NBC) as Amanda
- Amanda Peterson - Boone (NBC) as Squirt Sawyer

=== Best Young Actor in a Daytime Soap ===
★ (tie) David Mendenhall - General Hospital (ABC)
as Mike Webber ★ (tie) John Stamos - General Hospital (ABC) as Blackie Parrish

- Michael Damian - The Young and the Restless (CBS) as Danny Romalotti
- Lanny Palaco - As the World Turns (CBS)
- Damion Scheller - Search for Tomorrow (CBS) as Joshua Moreno

=== Best Young Actress in a Daytime Soap ===
★ Tracey Bregman - The Young and the Restless (CBS) as Lauren Fenmore

- Kristian Alfonso - Days of Our Lives (NBC) as Hope Williams Brady
- Lori-Nan Engler - The Doctors (ABC) as Greta Powers Aldrich
- Debbie Lytton - Days of Our Lives (NBC) as Melissa Horton
- Lisa Trusel - Days of Our Lives (NBC) as Melissa Horton

=== Best Young Actor: Guest in a Series ===
★ Timothy Patrick Murphy - The Love Boat (ABC) as Kent Holden/David

- Corey Feldman - Lottery! (ABC) as Adam Matson
- Jason Harvey - Gun Shy (NBC) as Little Jim
- Jason Lively - The Dukes of Hazzard (NBC) as Rod Moffet
- Chad Sheets - Magnum, P.I. (CBS) as Kip Hunter
- Byron Thames - CHiPs (NBC) as Kevin Cody

=== Best Young Actress: Guest in a Series ===
★ Dana Hill - Magnum, P.I. (CBS) as Willie

- Andre Fox - Diff'rent Strokes (NBC) as Angela
- Angela Lee - The Love Boat (ABC) as Jamie
- Heather O'Rourke - Webster (ABC) as Melanie
- Kim Richards - Magnum, P.I. (CBS) as Carrie Reardon

== Best Family Entertainment ==
=== Best Family Feature Motion Picture ===
★ Return of the Jedi (20th Century Fox)

- Cross Creek (Universal)
- The Golden Seal (Samuel Goldwyn)
- The Outsiders (Warner Bros.)
- WarGames (M.G.M.)

=== Best Family Motion Picture: Comedy or Musical ===
★ Mr. Mom (20th Century Fox)

- Max Dugan Returns (20th Century Fox)
- Staying Alive (Paramount)

=== Best New Television Series ===
★ Goodnight, Beantown (CBS)

- Boone (NBC)
- Jennifer Slept Here (NBC)
- Mr. Smith (NBC)
- Webster (ABC)
- Whiz Kids (CBS)

== Special awards ==
=== The Michael Landon Award ===
==== Outstanding Contribution To Youth Through Television ====
★ Norman Lear

=== The Jackie Coogan Award ===
==== Outstanding Contribution To Youth Through Motion Pictures ====
★ Snow White and the Seven Dwarfs - Disney

=== Youth In Film's Former Child Star Award ===
★ Ann Jillian

=== Youth in Film's Theatre Arts Award ===
★ Aaron Lohr

=== Youth In Film's Special Achievement Award ===
★ Glenn Scarpelli

=== Youth In Film's Community Benefit Award ===
★ Television Special Adam - John Walsh
