= You Can with Beakman and Jax =

American comic strip by Jok Church

- Title logo of comic, with Beakman (left), Jax (right), their U-can, and rainbow star.
- Author: Jok Church
- Current status/schedule: Ended
- Launch date: July 14, 1991
- End date: July 17, 2016
- Syndicate(s): Universal Press Syndicate/Universal Uclick
- Genre(s): Science, education

You Can with Beakman and Jax, also known in its Spanish-language version as El Mundo de Beakman ("The World of Beakman"), is an American science and education syndicated comic strip by Jok Church, which ran from July 14, 1991 to July 17, 2016. The comic strip, and associated television series, featured facts about science and languages.

The comic strip is a text-based comic, that answers readers' questions, with illustrations of the main characters, various objects, and, or the experiments being discussed. It is run as a single panel comic that appears in newspapers as a color, or black and white Sunday feature, in either a quarter-page strip, or half-tab format. The comic has reached a readership of fifty-two million readers in thirteen countries. About 80% of the letters it receives are from females. From its comic origins, its lead character Beakman would later star in his own live action television series, Beakman's World. The comic also branched out into other media, gaining numerous awards along the way. Its author died of a heart attack on April 29, 2016, after which the comic continued for nearly three months. Jok's final remaining comic was published on July 17, 2016, just three days after the strip's 25th anniversary of publication.

== Publication history and media ==
The comic first appeared in the Marin Independent Journal, and was offered to them for free. The earlier comic strips were then reprinted in three Science Stuff You Can Do books, a Best of, and was the bases for two specialty books, Beakman & Jax's Bubble Book and Beakman & Jax's Microscope Book.

In 1995, an official website opened for the strip published by the "North Bay Network", it won many awards. It later moved to its current location in 1996, published by Network Solutions. Where it has received several positive reviews from such internet guides as "The parents' pocket guide to kids & computers" by Family Computer Workshop, which gave the site 5 out of 5 stars and recommended it for readers 7–13. At the time the site contained questions and answers, as well as hands-on activities, some of which required Netscape and Shockwave Player.

The final strip was published on July 17, 2016, three days after its 25th anniversary and three months after Jok Church died.

== Format ==
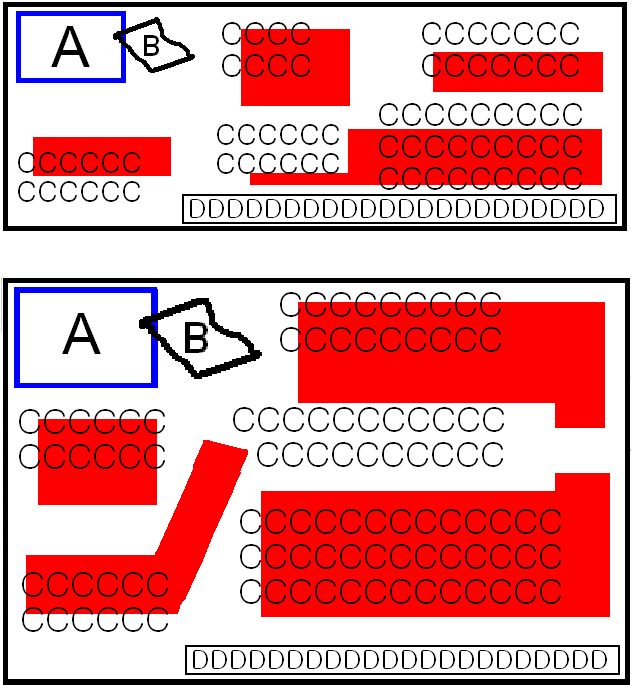
Example of comics, strip and tab formats. A = logo, B = question, C = text, D = inverted text, red boxes indicate background illustrations.

The comic strip was originally named You Can with Beakman (also called U Can with Beakman). Its only main character at the time was Beakman Place, a male figure with spiky blue hair, glasses, a neck tie, and a breast pocket full of instruments. Beakman is a non-scientist that learns about the world through books, and then finds ways to prove what he's read about. He was named after Beekman Place, a small street on the east side of Manhattan, New York City. The comic is in a question-and-answer format, in which a reader asks a question, addressed to either Beakman, or also later, his sister Jax Place, a red head, with her hair curled up behind her head in blue circular bands, she wears glasses, and jacks in her hair, and as earrings. Church provides the answer, usually by means of a simple experiment the children reading can do (often with parental assistance or supervision). A paragraph after the results of the experiment, in inverted text at the bottom of the comic, would explain the answer.

== Concept ==
The idea for doing a comic strip came to Jok while he was working for Lucasfilm, and answering questions from George Lucas's fan mail, stating that he was "overcome by the bravery children showed by asking Mr. Lucas anything at all" and he "decided to write about real questions from real kids". While working at Lucasfilm, Jok began working on a project called "Here's How" a comic strip and educational television series featuring C-3PO teaching foreign language and R2-D2 explaining the more physical world", the idea was eventually shelved, but the concept later evolved into Jok's comic strip featuring a character named Beakman. He would receive these science questions from children, and he would choose to answer them based on subjects that he didn't know about, and wanted to learn. The comic was written for an audience that includes children, but not exclusively children. He felt his purpose in making the comics was "to make sure my readers are not intimidated by the world through which they walk". He would then research the subject, write, draw, and color the comics by using a Macintosh computer. This process gained him criticism in May 1994 when he explained how to do an experiment separating hydrogen and oxygen from water, through electrolysis using a single jar and a nine-volt battery, for which he defended the comic strip, by explaining the small amount of gas that would be produced in this way would not be overly dangerous. The syndicate's managing editor claimed this to be the first time an experiment's safety was questioned.

Besides answering questions from children, Jok also took questions from adults. One such question came from the Canadian Prime Minister, Jean Chrétien, who asked about why golf balls had little dents. Jok later explained that he "has world leaders periodically contribute to his ... feature." Within the comic strip Jok also introduced an annual "Beakman and Jax Make Up Your Own Rules Contest", in which the reader could report on an experiment or research they did. There were up to 100 winners from around the world, and the prizes were such things as free telescopes and copies of the Beakman & Jax books.

== Preservation ==
After Jok's death, his various hard drives were donated to the Billy Ireland Cartoon Library and Museum at Ohio State University. Many of the comic strip files were preserved and posted on their website.

== In other media ==
Shortly after the release of the first book June 1, 1992, on September 18, 1992 an Emmy Award-winning television series named Beakman's World began, starring Paul Zaloom as the show's main character, along with three female laboratory assistants over the years, Lester the Rat, and two puppet penguins. According to Jok the television series was "written to build a bridge between children and the adult members of their family," and "we created the show to be like a live action cartoon." Beakman's sister Jax however, was not included in the television series, which Jok referred to as "my one disappointment with the show." Although his sister wasn't present in the television show, two of Beakman's family members did appear on the television show, his mother Beakmom, and his brother Meekman.
