= Labyorteaux =

Labyorteaux is a French surname that may refer to:

- Matthew Labyorteaux (born 1966), American film and television actor and voice artist
- Patrick Labyorteaux (born 1965), American actor, television producer and television writer, brother of Matthew
