= Todd Porter (actor) =

American former actor and model (born 1968)

- Born: Todd Daymond Porter; May 15, 1968 (age 57); Montclair, New Jersey
- Occupations: Actor, model
- Years active: 1976–1986
- Spouse: SuePorter/Jacqueline-Intili-Porter/Linda Porter

Todd Daymond Porter (born May 15, 1968) is an American former actor and model. Beginning his career as a professional child actor at the age of eight, Porter is perhaps best known for his television roles; as Chris on the Saturday morning children's series Starstuff and as Hamilton Parker on the CBS action-adventure series Whiz Kids.

== Early life ==
Porter was born in Montclair, New Jersey to parents Betty and R. Bruce Porter. He grew up in New Jersey with his parents and three older brothers; Frank, who was a musician, and Bruce and Rich, who were also child actors in commercials. Porter took an early interest in music and, by the age of five, he was learning to play the piano and drums, interests he would continue to pursue throughout his childhood and teenage years.

== Career ==
In 1976, Porter began his professional career as an actor and model at the age of eight, appearing in numerous television commercials and print advertorials throughout his childhood. In 1979, Porter made his theatrical debut co-starring as John Darling alongside Sandy Duncan as Peter Pan and George Rose as Captain Hook in the 1979 revival of Peter Pan during the months prior to the musical's premiere on Broadway.

In the fall of 1980, Porter made his television debut with a starring role on the locally produced WCAU-TV Saturday morning children's series Starstuff. On the science-fiction themed program, 12-year-old Porter starred in the lead role of Chris, a computer and radio enthusiast who builds a computer which enables him to communicate with a girl living in a space colony 30 years in the future. In December of that same year, Porter voiced the title role of Pinocchio in the Rankin/Bass stop-motion animated holiday special Pinocchio's Christmas.

In 1981, Porter made his feature film debut in the science fiction comedy Earthbound. In the film, Porter co-starred as Tommy Anderson alongside Burl Ives as his grandfather Ned Anderson as they befriend a family of extraterrestrials and help disguise them as humans after their space ship lands on earth. The film, originally produced by Sunn Classic Pictures in late 1979 when Todd was 11, was originally an NBC television series pilot with producers hoping for a 13-episode mid-season order. The film was then shelved when rejected by the network and later pulled out of Sunn Classic's catalog and released theatrically in 1981 following Sunn's takeover by Taft Broadcasting.

In the fall of 1983, Porter landed a co-starring role on the CBS mystery-adventure series, Whiz Kids. On the series, Porter once again portrayed an adolescent computer prodigy, co-starring as Hamilton "Ham" Parker, the best friend of Richie Adler, portrayed by Matthew Laborteaux who, along with a group of high school friends, solve crimes and bring perpetrators to justice with the help of Ralf, a talking computer.

Porter's portrayal of "Ham" on Whiz Kids earned the 15-year-old a 1983 Youth in Film Award (now known as the Young Artist Award) nomination as "Best Young Actor in a New Television Series" and launched him as a popular teen idol of the mid-1980s, with articles and pinups appearing in various teen magazines of the era, including 16 magazine, Bop and Teen Beat among others. The role also led to Porter and the rest of his teenage Whiz Kids co-stars to make a crossover appearance on the 1983 episode of Simon & Simon entitled "Fly the Alibi Skies".

== Personal life ==
During his time on Whiz Kids, Porter split his time living in California and New Jersey. At the time, the tenth-grader was reportedly an honor roll student at his New Jersey high school and was a member of his school's Key Club, a Kiwanis-inspired organization for young achievers. His extra-curricular activities at the time included playing his grand piano, two synthesizers and 28-piece drum set. Other interests included baseball, basketball, break-dancing, photography and his state-of-the-art Atari 800 computer.

== Filmography ==
Film
Year	Film	Role	Notes
1981	Earthbound	Tommy Anderson	—
Television
Year	Program	Role	Notes
1980–1981	Starstuff	Chris	Starring
1980	Pinocchio's Christmas	Pinocchio	(Voice)
1983–1984	Whiz Kids	Hamilton "Ham" Parker	Starring
1983	Simon & Simon	Hamilton "Ham" Parker	Episode: "Fly the Alibi Skies"
1986	Kate & Allie	Jeff	Episode: Winning
Theatre
Year	Production	Role	Notes
1979	Peter Pan	John Darling	—

== Awards ==
Year	Award	Category	Work	Result	Ref.
1983	Youth in Film Award (now known as the Young Artist Award)	Best Young Actor in a New Television Series	Whiz Kids	Nominated	
