= West Kortright Centre =

- West Kortright Presbyterian Church
- U.S. National Register of Historic Places
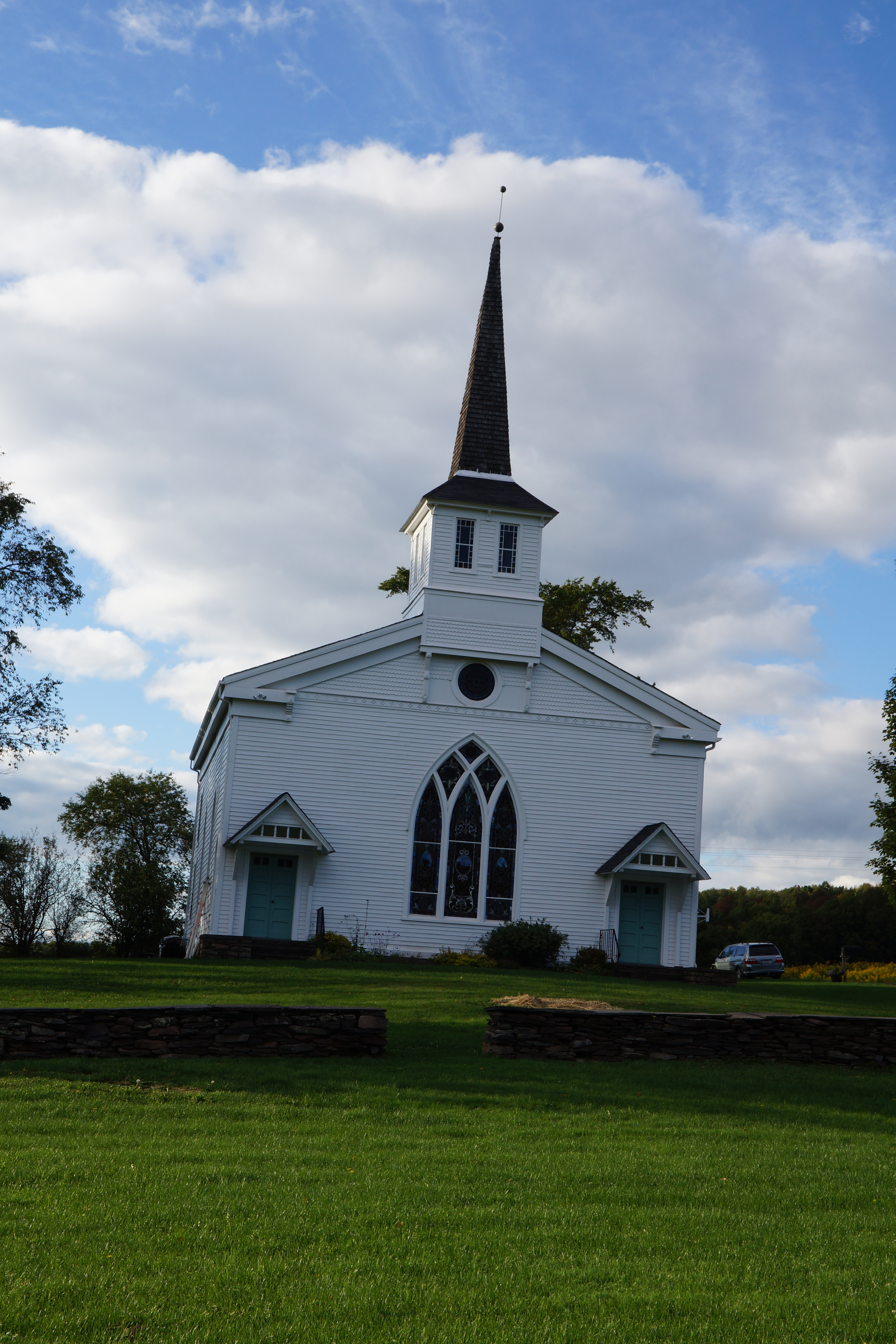

- Location within New York
- Location: 49 W. Kortright Church Rd., East Meredith, New York
- Coordinates: 42°24′8″N 74°51′8″W
- Area: less than one acre
- Built: 1850
- Architectural style: Greek Revival with Gothic Revival accents
- Website: https://westkc.org/
- NRHP reference No.: 02001326
- Added to NRHP: November 15, 2002

The West Kortright Center is a non-profit arts and community center in Delaware County, New York, United States. Prior to 1975, the building housed the West Kortright Presbyterian Church. The building was constructed in 1850 and substantially remodeled in the 1890s.

In 1975, local residents worked to repurpose the Greek Revival West Kortright Presbyterian Church, with its late Victorian stained glass windows, kerosene chandeliers, curved pews and woodwork. It was added to the National Register of Historic Places and became a National Historic Landmark in 2002.

In addition to hosting musical and theatrical performers from a variety of genres, the WKC offers garden tours, exhibits from local visual artists, and arts and crafts workshops in subjects such as basket weaving, stone wall restoration, and creative writing.

In 1987, writer and director Nancy Fales Garrett founded the Shakespeare in the Valley summer program, which teaches acting and theater tech skills to children and teenagers.

Artists presented at the West Kortright Center since 1975 have included:

Composers

- John Cage
- Meredith Monk
- Peter Schickele
- Virgil Thomson

Poets

- Allen Ginsberg
- Sekou Sundiata
- Hayden Carruth

Bluegrass, country, and roots musicians

- Rhonda Vincent
- J.D. Crowe
- The Cox Family
- Claire Lynch
- Mary Gauthier

Traditional musicians

- Queen Ida and her Zydeco Band
- Solas
- Fairfield Four
- Johnny Cunningham
- Susan McKeown
- Karan Casey
- Barachois

Jazz performers

- Jack DeJohnette
- Teddy Wilson
- Mulgrew Miller
- Kenny Burrell
- Jacky Terrasson
- Steve Lacy
- Sonny Fortune
- Dakota Staton

Folk musicians

- Greg Brown
- Leo Kottke
- Amos Lee
- Odetta
- The Roches
- Nellie McKay
- Richie Havens

Blues musicians

- Mose Allison
- Henry Butler
- Clarence “Gatemouth” Brown
- John P. Hammond
- The Holmes Brothers
- James Cotton
- Olu Dara
- Pinetop Perkins
- Junior Wells

Monologists

- Paul Zaloom

International performers

- Antibalas Afrobeat Orchestra
- Hassan Hakmoun
- Bhundu Boys
- Luciana Souza
- The Skatalites
- Susana Baca
