= Teresa Parente =

American actress and singer (born 1955)

- Born: 1955 (age 70–71); The Bronx, New York City, U.S.
- Occupations: Television actress, singer
- Years active: 1991-present
- Spouse: Mark Ritts (?-2009) (his death) (3 children)
- Children: James Ritts; Gabriella Ritts; Daniel
- Website: http://www.teresaparente.com

Teresa Parente is an American actress and singer.

== Career ==
She is best known for her recurrent role on the Fox Broadcasting Company's sitcom Married... with Children as hapless television reporter "Miranda Veracruz de la Jolla Cardinal", whose catchphrase was simply saying her name. She played more than forty different female characters, including the show's main love interest, on the Brandon Tartikoff/PBS comedy series, The Steven Banks Show, and has guest-starred on many other American television series, including Night Court, L.A. Law, Cafe Americain, Friends, and 3rd Rock from the Sun. In 2002, she debuted as a feature film actress in New Line Cinema's S1m0ne, written and directed by Andrew Niccol and starring Al Pacino. Shortly thereafter, she was cast as Anthony LaPaglia's suicidal mother (in flashback) on CBS's Without a Trace, appearing in three episodes of the series. She was female lead Roxanne Bojarski's mother in multiple episodes of the NBC dramatic series American Dreams, and in 2006, she narrowly escaped death in a hail of gunfire on CBS's drama series Numb3rs.

Parente is a stage actress, singer and performer in many TV and radio commercials. She is currently singing jazz at Los Angeles venues as a featured soloist with Concert Choirs (most recently with the Hollywood Master Chorale), and she gives private performances featuring jazz gems and selections from the Great American Songbook. In 2008, she formed the Sisters of Swing (S.O.S), an Andrews Sisters-style girl group.

== Personal life ==
Widow of actor/writer/producer Mark Ritts, she has a daughter and son. She is a native of The Bronx, New York.

== Filmography ==
- SpongeBob SquarePants as SpongeBob's opera voice (1 episode, 2011)
- Numb3rs as Denise Davis (1 episode, 2006)
- Without a Trace as A.S.A.C. Doris Malone (2 episodes, 2004–2005)
- Judging Amy as Joan Vento (1 episode, 2004)
- American Dreams as Mrs. Bojarsky (1 episode, 2004)
- Less Than Perfect as Cranky Receptionist in Sperm Bank (1 episode, 2003)
- American Dreams as Lenore Bojarski (1 episode, 2002)
- S1m0ne (2002) as Talk Show Host #1
- Friends as the Woman at Wedding (1 episode, 2001)
- Strong Medicine as Maya Chavez (1 episode, 2001)
- Gepetto as Maria (2000) (TV)
- The Wonderful World of Disney as Maria (1 episode, 2000)
- Sabrina, the Teenage Witch as Miss Sorecorn (1 episode, 2000)
- Malcolm & Eddie as Cassandra 'Caz' DeVille (1 episode, 2000)
- Shark in a Bottle (1998) as the Saleswoman
- CatDog as Maria Cowess / Mrs. Banks (1 episode, 1999)
- The Hughleys as Mrs. Inez (1 episode, 1998)
- 3rd Rock from the Sun as Dahlia (1 episode, 1998)
- Married... with Children as Miranda Veracruz de la Jolla Cardinal (9 episodes, 1994–1996)
- Vanishing Son as Elaine Ross (1 episode, 1995)
- The Steven Banks Show as Mariana (1 episode, 1994)
- Cafe Americain as Cecile (1 episode, 1993)
- Night Court as Mary Theresa Schiavelli (1 episode, 1991)
