= Shattered Spirits =

American television film

- VHS cover art
- Genre: Drama
- Written by: Gregory Goodell
- Directed by: Robert Greenwald
- Starring: Martin Sheen; Melinda Dillon; Matthew Labyorteaux; Lukas Haas; Roxana Zal
- Music by: Michael Hoenig
- Country of origin: United States
- Original language: English

Production
- Executive producer: Paul Pompian
- Producer: Robert Greenwald
- Cinematography: John Jensen
- Editor: Robert Florio
- Running time: 93 minutes
- Production companies: Robert Greenwald Productions; Sheen/Greenblatt Productions

Original release
- Network: ABC
- Release: January 6, 1986

Shattered Spirits is a 1986 American television drama film directed by Robert Greenwald, starring Martin Sheen, Melinda Dillon, Matthew Labyorteaux, Lukas Haas, and Roxana Zal. Sheen plays Lyle Mollencamp, an alcoholic father who loses his family.

== Plot ==
Lyle Mollencamp is an alcoholic. His wife, Joyce, struggles to cover their family's distress. His three children react in different ways: Kenny has become rebellious; Lesley has totally immersed herself in school activities, and 8 year old Brian has been shielded from his father's problems. That's only until Lyle's drinking costs him his job and spoils Brian's birthday. For Kenny it's the last straw. The confrontation between father and son is so explosive that Lyle must deal with his problem. Lyle goes into rehab for 86 days and returns home for an outdoor picnic. He immediately orders changes and dominates the family. In a fit of rage, he storms off and buys a bottle of liquor. He returns home with the bottle unopened. The movie ends on hope with the father a far way from recovery.

== Cast ==
- Martin Sheen as Lyle Mollencamp
- Melinda Dillon as Joyce Mollencamp
- Matthew Labyorteaux as Kenny Mollencamp
- Lukas Haas as Brian Mollencamp
- Roxana Zal as Lesley Mollencamp
- Jill Schoelen as Allison
- Jenny Gago as Mavis

== Reception ==
Los Angeles Times reviewer Lee Margulies says the film outlines the well known pernicious effects of alcoholism on the Mollencamp family. The film chronicles the grim, often painful detail of "the lives of alcoholic Lyle Mollencamp, his weak, apologetic wife and their three emotionally scarred children." Margulies praised the depiction of the toll taken on the family from the father Lyle (Martin Sheen)'s lies, denial and guilt and the mother Joyce (Melinda Dillon)'s enabling weakness, which leads to a broken home. He finds a uniformly excellent cast and especially likes Matthew Laborteaux "the 15-year-old boy who is most affected by, yet least forgiving, of his father's behavior."
