= Jok Church =

American writer

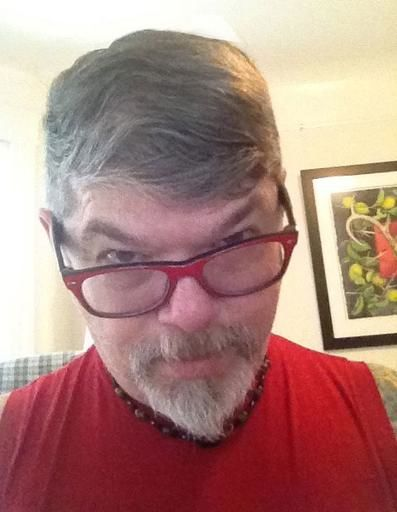
- Born: November 28, 1949 Akron, Ohio, U.S.
- Died: April 29, 2016 (aged 66) Castro District, San Francisco, California
- Areas: Writer, Cartoonist
- Notable works: Beakman's World; You Can With Beakman and Jax; You Can with Beakman: Science Stuff You Can Do by Andrews-McMeel Publishing

Jok Richard Church (November 28, 1949 – April 29, 2016) was an American cartoonist who created the Universal Press Syndicate syndicated comic strip You Can with Beakman and Jax, later adapted into the TV series Beakman's World. The series premiered September 18, 1992, on The Learning Channel (TLC) cable network and in national syndication (225 stations, a freshman year record). On September 18, 1993, it moved from national syndication to CBS Saturday morning children's lineup. At the peak of its popularity, it was seen in nearly 90 countries around the world.

He created his comic strip You Can with Beakman & Jax in 1991 for his local newspaper in Marin County, California—inspired by a stint answering kids' letters for Lucasfilm. It was the first-ever syndicated newspaper comic drawn and distributed by computer, a Macintosh SE using Adobe Illustrator 88. The comic strip does not answer readers' questions directly; it gives directions for creating an experiment for one to discover the answer independently.

His weekly newspaper feature was posted to his Twitter mini-blog page the week after newspapers had published it.

Jok Church died in San Francisco from a heart attack on April 29, 2016.

== Early life and career ==
Jok Church was born in Akron, Ohio raised in Akron and Munroe Falls, Ohio and attended high school in Stow, Ohio.

After running away from home, Church hitchhiked to San Francisco, California and began working in what was then called "underground" radio with news director careers at KTIM, San Rafael, California; KERS and KZAP, Sacramento.

As a co-founder and resident at Damian House Gay Men's Collective in Sacramento, Church came out as a gay man on the air on KZAP in 1970. He and his late partner Adam Kazimir Ciesielski were together for 34 years. Church was also the webmaster for environmental artist Christo, whom he met in 1976 during the installation of "Running Fence."

== 1979 March on Washington recording ==
Jok attended the National March on Washington for Lesbian and Gay Rights with Adam Ciesielski on October 14, 1979. Together, they recorded a documentary vinyl LP of the main speeches at the event. The recording includes the voices of Robin Tyler, Steve Ault, Tom Robinson, Lucia Valeska, Allen Ginsberg, Arlie Scott, Richard Ashworth, Florynce Kennedy, Charles Law, Mary Watkins & Company, Kate Millett, the Reverend Troy Perry, and people on the Gay Freedom Train. Adam Ciesielski is credited for the photos. The record was released by Magnus Records of Sacramento, California in association with Alternate Publishing. Houston LGBT History holds an online recording of the record.

== TED talk ==
Jok attended the TED conference in Monterey, California, on March 7–10, 2007 and gave a short talk entitled "A circle of caring". At the time of his death, the talk had been translated into 41 languages and viewed 649,716 times. The talk was about two incidents from his personal life that had to do with creating and holding safe spaces for those in need.

Church's death was noted in the TED Blog on May 1, 2016.
