= West Kortright Presbyterian Church =

Historic church in New York, United States

- U.S. National Register of Historic Places
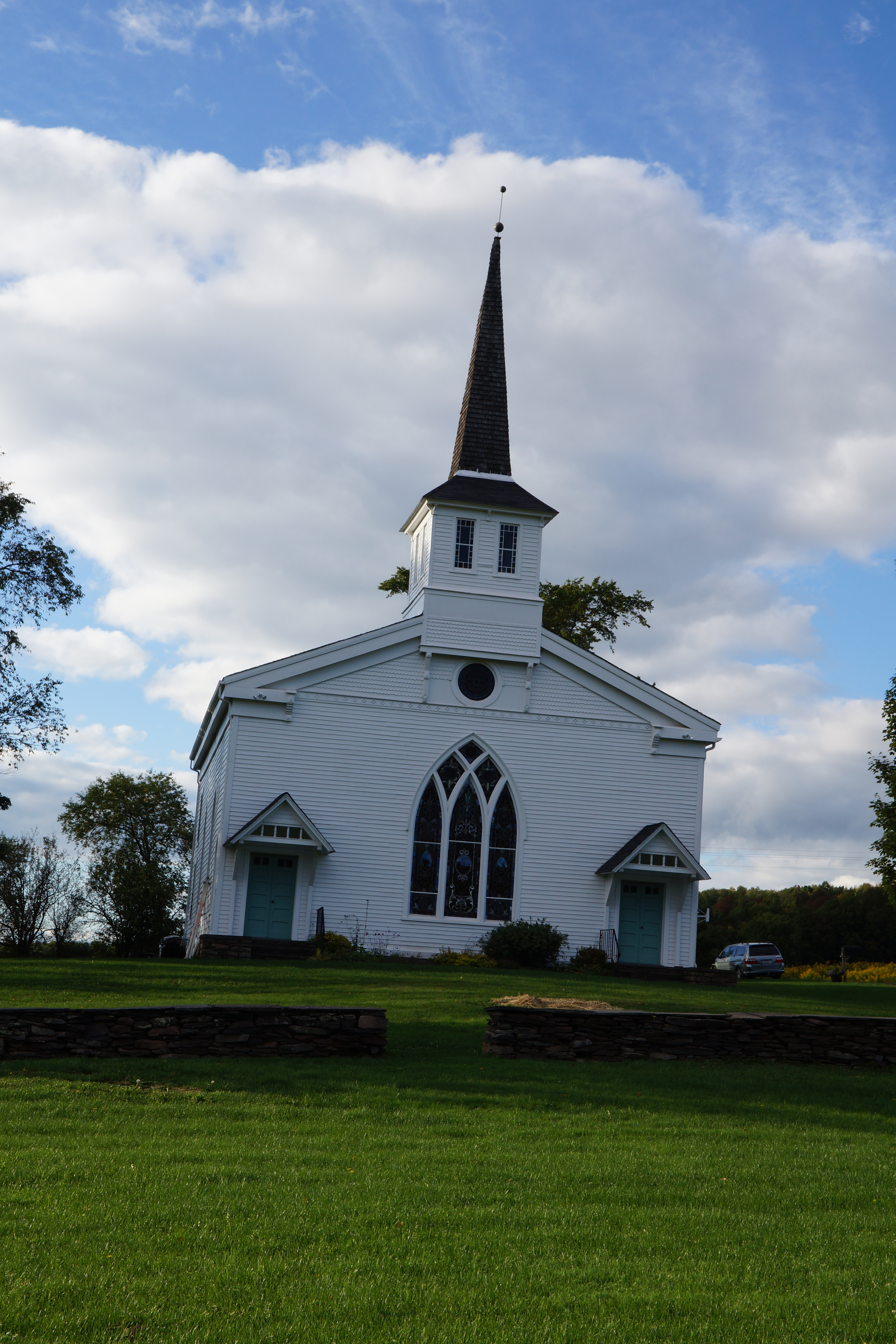

- Location within New York Location within the United States
- Location: 49 W. Kortright Church Rd., West Kortright, New York
- Coordinates: 42°24′8″N 74°51′8″W
- Area: less than one acre
- Built: 1850
- Architectural style: Mid 19th Century Revival, Late Victorian
- NRHP reference No.: 02001326
- Added to NRHP: November 15, 2002

West Kortright Presbyterian Church is a historic Presbyterian church located at 49 W. Kortright Church Road in West Kortright, Delaware County, New York. It is a wood-frame building on a stone foundation surmounted by a broad gable roof. It was originally constructed in 1850 and substantially renovated in 1890s.

In 1975, local residents vowed to save the West Kortright Presbyterian Church, with its beautiful stained glass windows, kerosene chandeliers, and rich woodwork and the church began its second life of service. Now a Historic Landmark, the Greek Revival structure became home to The West Kortright Centre, a not-for-profit organization in arts programming and presentation.

It was added to the National Register of Historic Places in 2002.

== See also ==
- National Register of Historic Places listings in Delaware County, New York
