= Earthbound (1981 film) =

1981 film directed by James L. Conway

- Theatrical release poster
- Directed by: James L. Conway
- Written by: Michael Fisher
- Produced by: Michael Fisher
- Starring: Burl Ives; Todd Porter; Christopher Connelly; Meredith MacRae
- Cinematography: Paul Hipp
- Edited by: Michael Spence
- Music by: Bob Summers
- Distributed by: Taft International Pictures
- Release date: January 30, 1981
- Running time: 94 minutes
- Country: United States
- Language: English

Earthbound is a 1981 American science fiction comedy film directed by James L. Conway. It received limited theatrical release after being rejected as a television pilot.

== Plot summary ==
When a family of benevolent humanoid aliens is stranded in the Midwestern United States after their spaceship crashes, a kind innkeeper (Burl Ives) and his grandson (Todd Porter) take them in. Once word gets out that aliens have landed, Sheriff De Rita (John Schuck) and Deputy Sweeney (Stuart Pankin) prove unable to handle the crowds. A government agent (Joseph Campanella) arrives, who wants to assure that the aliens cannot intermingle with humankind.

== Cast ==
- Burl Ives as Ned Anderson
- Todd Porter as Tommy Anderson
- Christopher Connelly as Zef
- Meredith MacRae as Lara
- Joseph Campanella as Conrad
- Marc Gilpin as Dalem
- Mindy Dow as Rosie
- Elissa Leeds as Teva
- Peter Isacksen as Willy
- John Schuck as Sheriff De Rita
- Joey Forman as Madden
- Stuart Pankin as Sweeney
- H.M. Wynant as Dave
- Doodles Weaver as Sterling
- Jesse Bennett as Gold Rush Man #2
- Anne Lockhart as Mom
- Cindy Bertagnolli as Unknown Extra
- Allen Tatomer as Extra, Local Posse, Townie
- Scottie Anderson as Extra, Local Posse, Townie

== Production ==
Parts of the film were shot in Park City, Utah. The movie was developed as a TV pilot, and released theatrically when the networks showed no interest. John Schuck stated that while the area where the movie was shot was beautiful, the two-week production of the film was rushed and the script was lacking. He also felt the 16-mm filming did not lend itself to a theatrical release.

== Reception ==
In Creature Feature, the movie received 2 out of 5 stars, finding the direction lacking. The show was cited as one that had potential, but was not picked up as a series in Starlog.
