= Pinocchio's Christmas =

1980 Christmas TV special

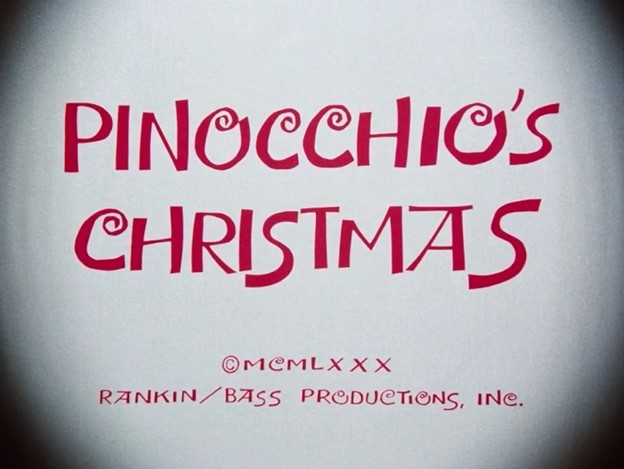
- Title page
- Based on: The Adventures of Pinocchio by Carlo Collodi
- Written by: Romeo Muller
- Directed by: Jules Bass; Arthur Rankin, Jr.
- Starring: Todd Porter; George S. Irving; Alan King; Bob McFadden; Allen Swift
- Theme music composer: Maury Laws
- Countries of origin: United States; Japan
- Original language: English

Production
- Producers: Jules Bass; Arthur Rankin, Jr.
- Cinematography: Akikazu Kono; Ichiro Komuro
- Running time: 49 minutes
- Production company: Rankin/Bass Productions

Original release
- Network: ABC
- Release: December 3, 1980

Related
- Rudolph the Red-Nosed Reindeer (1964) (Note: Recurring characters include Rudolph (voiced by Billie Mae Richards), Santa Claus (voiced by Stan Francis), and Mrs. Claus (voiced by Peg Dixon) in this special. Various actors portray the other reindeer.); Frosty the Snowman (1969) (Note: Recurring characters include Frosty the Snowman (voiced by Jackie Vernon), Santa (voiced by Paul Frees), and Professor Hinkle Tinkerton (voiced by Billy De Wolfe) in this special. Santa's reindeer also feature.); Santa Claus Is Comin' to Town (1970) (Note: Recurring characters include Santa (voiced by Mickey Rooney), Mrs. Jessica Claus (voiced by Robie Lester), and S.D. Kluger (voiced by Fred Astaire) in this special. Rudolph and Santa's other reindeer also feature.); Here Comes Peter Cottontail (1971) (Note: Recurring characters include the Easter Bunny (voiced by Casey Kasem), and Santa (voiced by Frees) in this special. Santa's reindeer also feature.); 'Twas the Night Before Christmas (1974) (Note: Recurring characters in this special include Santa (voiced by Allen Swift), alongside his featured reindeer.); The Year Without a Santa Claus (1974) (Note: Recurring characters include Santa (voiced by Rooney), Mrs. Claus (voiced by Shirley Booth), Snow Miser (voiced by Dick Shawn), Heat Miser (voiced by George S. Irving), and Mother Nature (voiced by Rhoda Mann) in this special. Rudolph and Santa's other reindeer also feature.); The First Easter Rabbit (1976) (Note: Recurring characters include Easter Bunny (voiced by Robert Morse and Burl Ives), and Santa (voiced by Frees) in this special. Santa's reindeer also feature.); Frosty's Winter Wonderland (1976) (Note: Recurring characters include Frosty (voiced by Vernon), Mrs. Crystal Frosty (voiced by Shelley Winters), and Jack Frost (voiced by Frees) in this special.); Rudolph's Shiny New Year (1976) (Note: Recurring characters include Rudolph (voiced by Richards) and Santa (voiced by Frees) in this special. Santa's other reindeer also feature.); The Easter Bunny Is Comin' to Town (1977) (Note: Recurring characters include Easter Bunny (voiced by Skip Hinnant), and S.D. Kluger (voiced by Astaire) in this special.); Nestor, the Long-Eared Christmas Donkey (1977) (Note: Recurring characters in this special include Santa (voiced by Frees), alongside Rudolph and his other featured reindeer.); The Stingiest Man in Town (1978) (Note: Recurring characters in this special include Santa Claus during a scene which compares the Ghost of Christmas Present to him (both characters were voiced by Frees).); Jack Frost (1979) (Note: The recurring character is Jack Frost (voiced by Robert Morse) in this special.); Rudolph and Frosty's Christmas in July (1979) (Note: Recurring characters include Rudolph (voiced by Richards), Frosty (voiced by Vernon), Santa (voiced by Rooney), Mrs. Claus (voiced by Darlene Conley), Crystal (voiced by Winters), and Jack Frost (voiced by Frees) in this special. Santa's other reindeer also feature.); Pinocchio's Christmas (1980) (Note: The recurring characters in the special include Santa (voiced by Swift), alongside his featured reindeer.); Frosty Returns (1992) (Note: The recurring character is Frosty (voiced by John Goodman) in this special. Mother Nature is also referenced in the short.); Rudolph the Red-Nosed Reindeer and the Island of Misfit Toys (2001) (Note: Recurring characters include Rudolph (voiced by Kathleen Barr), Santa (voiced by Garry Chalk), and Mrs. Claus (also voiced by Barr) in this film. Santa's other reindeer, and various other characters from the 1964 original also feature.); The Legend of Frosty the Snowman (2005) (Note: Recurring characters include Frosty (voiced by Bill Fagerbakke), and Professor Tinkerton (voiced by Kath Soucie) in this special.); A Miser Brothers' Christmas (2008) (Note: Recurring characters include Snow Miser (voiced by Juan Chioran), Heat Miser (voiced by Irving), Santa (voiced by Rooney), Mrs. Claus (voiced by Catherine Disher), and Mother Earth (voiced by Patricia Hamilton) in this special. Santa's reindeer also feature.)

Pinocchio's Christmas is a 1980 Christmas stop motion television special produced by Rankin/Bass Productions that is a holiday adaptation of the 1883 novel The Adventures of Pinocchio by Carlo Collodi. The special premiered on ABC on December 3, 1980. It aired annually during the Christmas season on Freeform and as of 2018 airs on AMC. Both this special and The Life and Adventures of Santa Claus are the only 2 Rankin/Bass Christmas specials to not have any celebrity narrators.

== Plot ==
It is Pinocchio's first Christmas and Geppetto is trying to figure out how to buy a Christmas present for him. So he sells his boots to buy an arithmetic book for Pinocchio who later on sells the book to buy a present for Geppetto.

However, he soon runs into the Fox and Cat, whom he thinks are his only friends. The Fox and the Cat convince Pinocchio that he should bury the money he got back for the book in the snow and when the sun sets, they will grow into a Christmas tree covered with gold and silver coins. Pinocchio does exactly that. While he's not there to pay attention, the Fox and the Cat dig the coins out of the ground before he returns.

When Pinocchio returns and finds that the tree didn't grow with the Fox and the Cat claiming that the tree failed to grow, he takes part in Maestro Fire-Eater's Christmas puppet show, billed as "Sir Larry Olive-Tree". During the show, he befriends Julietta, one of Fire-Eater's marionettes. After the show, Maestro Fire-Eater tells Pinocchio that he needs to turn Jullietta into one of the Magi for a Christmas pageant next week. But Pinocchio runs off, taking Julietta with him. Maestro Fire-Eater calls a nearby gendarme to chase after him.

Pinocchio manages to escape the gendarmes and brings Julietta with him to the Forest of Enchantment where he was born. Pinocchio explains his backstory to her like how he came to life, how he accidentally drove away a Talking Cricket that Geppetto is friends with, and how he met the Fox and the Cat who taught him how to misbehave and play hooky from school.

After finishing his story, Pinocchio fears he may never see his father again. Just then, the Fox and the Cat show up telling Pinocchio they know how he can bring Julietta to life using a secret medicine which he can only find if he goes on a sleigh ride over seven mountains and seven valleys.

Before Pinocchio can embark on that journey though, a blue light appears calling out his name which scares away the Fox and the Cat and causes Pinocchio to faint. It is soon revealed to be Lady Azura who planted the seed that grew into the tree Pinocchio was originally chopped down from. She brings in a doctor whom Pinocchio recognizes as the Talking Cricket. Pinocchio attempts to explain his terrible action of stealing Julietta from Maestro Fire-Eater by lying which causes his nose to grow. Upon seeing what has happened to his nose, Pinocchio tells the truth and it returns to normal. Azura tells Pinocchio that the only gift he really needs to give Geppetto is love. With that, Pinocchio leaves Julietta in Lady Azura's care and Dr. Cricket goes to make sure Pinocchio stays out of trouble.

Pinocchio starts making his way home, but he suddenly again runs into the Fox and the Cat who say that he should go to the North Pole and get a job teaching Santa Claus' toys how to dance. They bring Pinocchio to a sleigh driver they were speaking with earlier who wraps Pinocchio up in a gift box and sells it to a duke who needs a present to give to his children, whom he does not spend much time with. When the kids open up their present, Pinocchio tells the Duke that he should stay home with his kids for Christmas.

Afterward, Santa Claus arrives in his sleigh and brings Pinocchio and Dr. Cricket back to Geppetto's workshop, where Pinocchio is joyously reunited with his father and promises to always be a good boy. Lady Azura then arrives with her servants and a now-sentient Julietta and they all sit down to Christmas breakfast.

During the meal, Lady Azura tells Pinocchio that while he may be led astray as Pinocchio sees the Fox and the Cat briefly waving at him in the window. He will also have many other misadventures (such as getting turned into a donkey and getting swallowed by a whale). As long as he stays on the path of being a good boy, he will someday gain the reward of being a real boy.

== Cast ==
An original advertisement for the television special.

- Todd Porter as Pinocchio
- George S. Irving as Mister Geppetto
- Alan King as Maestro Fire-Eater
- Bob McFadden as:
  - Talking Cricket
  - Sleigh Driver
- Allen Swift as:
  - The Fox
  - Santa Claus
  - Mr. Cherry
- Pat Bright as The Cat
- Diane Leslie as Lady Azura
- Gerry Matthews as Additional voice
- Ray Owens as Additional voice
- Tiffany Blake as Child
- Carl Tramon – Child
- Alice Gayle – Child

== Staff ==
- Producers/Directors – Arthur Rankin, Jr., Jules Bass
- Writer – Romeo Muller
- Music – Maury Laws
- Lyrics – Julian P. Gardner
- Design – Paul Coker, Jr.
- Sound Recording – John Curcio
- Production Coordinator – Lee Dannacher
- Associate Producer – Masaki Iizuka
- Animagic Supervisors – Akikazu Kono, Ichiro Komuro, Hiroshi Tabata, Seiichi Araki, Fuminori Minami, Mituharu Hirata, Shinichi Noro
- Music Arranger/Conductor – Maury Laws

== Songs ==
- "I Never Know What Gifts To Buy" – Geppetto
- "Knock On Wood" – Pinocchio and Chorus
- "Let 'Em Laugh" – Maestro Fire-Eater and Chorus
- "It's The Truth" – The Fox and the Cat
- "Love, The Perfect Gift For Christmas Day" – Lady Azora and Pinocchio
- "The Very Best Friend I Ever Had" – Geppetto
- "Dancin'" – Pinocchio and Chorus
- "Wicked Glee" – Sleigh Driver

== See also ==
- The New Adventures of Pinocchio (1961), also produced by Rankin/Bass
