= Starstuff =

Television series

- Title card
- Genre: Science fiction Children
- Written by: Dorothy Louise; Don Matticks
- Directed by: Don Matticks
- Starring: Todd Porter; Johanna Hickey
- Voices of: Mark Ritts
- Theme music composer: Gustav Holst
- Opening theme: The Planets
- Country of origin: United States
- Original language: English
- No. of seasons: 1
- No. of episodes: 18

Production
- Executive producer: Inez Gottlieb
- Editor: Frances Harty
- Running time: 60 minutes
- Production company: CBS-TV

Original release
- Network: WCAU-TV

Starstuff is an hour-long children's television program taped at WCAU-TV Studios on City Line Avenue in Bala Cynwyd, Pennsylvania. It was shown in the Philadelphia television market only. There was only one season of Starstuff with a total of 18 episodes. The debut episode was aired on Friday, August 29, 1980 at 7:00pm, with the following episodes shown at 7:30am on Sunday mornings for the rest of the season. Reruns for Starstuff were shown repeatedly until the spring of 1991, usually airing at 6:00am or 6:30am on Saturday mornings. The opening and closing music consisted of a mélange of music from Gustav Holst's The Planets suite, movements four and six, Jupiter and Uranus.

== Format ==
Starstuff centered around a boy named Chris (Todd Porter) and a girl named Ingrid (Johanna Hickey), both 12 years old. Chris lived in a house in Philadelphia, PA in present day 1980, and had built himself a computer with a video terminal in his bedroom. Ingrid lives in the year 2010 on Alpha, Earth's first space colony, and was the first child born there. For her 12th birthday, she was given an Earth Study Center, a computer system designed to educate its user on all things having to do with life on Earth. Chris and Ingrid meet each other after their computer systems manage to establish two-way video transmission, and the rest of the show centers around their secret conversations with each other through their screens. These conversations were broken up by various segments in which they'd watch short films together, such as clips from Laurel and Hardy's Laughtunes as well as snippets of the educational children's news show, Kidsworld. Episodes tended to focus on particular topics such as divorce, loneliness, and crushes.

There was a sub-show within Starstuff titled The Edge Of Space that was shown about halfway through each episode. Lasting approximately 10 minutes, it was a space-based puppet segment starring Krikles, Zornad, and their robot assistant, Giz, as they explored the universe in their spaceship searching for life. From puppeteer Mark Ritts: I taped the puppet bits separately, perhaps a half dozen at a time, on a day when the main cast was off learning their lines. So I don't remember even meeting them ... Krikles's voice was a simple, light character voice that I have used years, variously adapted, for a string of characters, including Storytime's "Kino" (PBS). Zornad's voice was a bit of a steal from a favorite comic of mine who used to be a regular on the old Steve Allen Show—Dayton Allen, whose signature line was "Whyyyyy not??!"

== Starstuff Cast ==
- Chris: Todd Porter
- Ingrid: Johanna Hickey
- Aunt Val: Margaret Hunt
- Uncle Pete: Johnnie Hobbs
- Chris' Mom: Elowyn Castle
- Ingrid's Dad: Gary Silow

== Starstuff Staff ==
- Writer: Dorothy Louise
- Director: Don Matticks
- Executive Producer: Inez Gottlieb
- Associate Producer: Suzanne Hansberry
- Production Assistant: Nan Gilbert
- Set Design: John Ferlaine
- Set Construction: Chuck Wells
- Lighting Director: Al Vanaman
- Videotape: Pat Lynch
- Field Camera: Phil Carroll
- Technical Director: Charles Cleveland
- Camera: Art Pitcairn, Pete Cain, Jim Manning, Irv Gubin, Joe Sidlo
- Audio: David Bowa
- Video: Bill Wagner, Ted Vawter, Al Strelau, Dan Falzani
- Floor Managers: Jess L. Schooley, Raymond Fiedler, William Cawley
- Field Audio: George Schumaker
- Editing: Frances Harty

== The Edge Of Space Staff ==
- Writer: Don Matticks
- Puppeteer: Mark Ritts
- Puppet Design: Eli Bauer
- Puppets Built By: Kathy Rogers
