= The Lazarus Syndrome =

- Genre: Drama; Thriller
- Written by: William Blinn (writer)
- Directed by: Jerry Thorpe
- Starring: See below
- Theme music composer: John Rubinstein
- Country of origin: United States
- Original language: English

Production
- Producers: William Blinn; Jerry Thorpe
- Cinematography: Chuck Arnold
- Editor: Byron Chudnow
- Running time: 73 minutes
- Production company: Viacom Productions

Original release
- Network: ABC
- Release: September 4, 1979

The Lazarus Syndrome is a 1979 American made-for-television drama thriller film directed by Jerry Thorpe. It was later the basis for a weekly television series of the same name, airing on the ABC network.

== Cast ==
- Louis Gossett Jr. as Dr. MacArthur St. Clair
- Ronald Hunter as Joe Hamill
- E. G. Marshall as Dr. Mendel
- Sheila Frazier as Gloria St. Clair
- Lara Parker as Denice
- Peggy Walton-Walker as Mrs. Hamill
- René Enríquez as Mr. Dominguez
- Philip Sterling as Skeptical Doctor
- Peggy McCay as Stacy
- Arthur Rosenberg as Anesthesiologist
- Mary Carver as Nurse
- Roberta Jean Williams as Nurse
- Ethelinn Block as Nurse
- Vincent Milana
- John Berwick as Crash Cart Nurse
- Jeffrey Jacquet as St. Clair Son
- Alene Wilson
