= Whiz Kids (TV series) =

American science fiction adventure television series

- Genre: Science fiction; Action/Adventure
- Created by: Philip DeGuere; Bob Shayne
- Starring: Matthew Laborteaux; Todd Porter; Jeffrey Jacquet; Andrea Elson; Melanie Gaffin; Max Gail; A Martinez
- Theme music composer: Paul Chihara (uncredited); Wolfgang Amadeus Mozart (adaptation)
- Composers: Paul Chihara; J. A. C. Redford; Ian Underwood; David Bell
- Country of origin: United States
- Original language: English
- No. of seasons: 1
- No. of episodes: 18

Production
- Executive producer: Philip DeGuere
- Producers: Joe Gannon; Bob Shayne; James Crocker
- Cinematography: Fred J. Koenekamp
- Editor: Ellen Ring Jacobson
- Running time: 60 minutes (with commercials)
- Production company: Universal Television

Original release
- Network: CBS
- Release: October 5, 1983 – June 2, 1984

Related
- Simon & Simon

Whiz Kids is an American science fiction adventure television series that originally aired on CBS from October 5, 1983, to June 2, 1984. The show was created by Philip DeGuere, who had also created the detective series Simon & Simon for CBS in 1981, and Bob Shayne and produced by Universal Television. DeGuere also served as executive producer.

The series starred Matthew Laborteaux, Todd Porter, Jeffrey Jacquet and Andrea Elson as the titular “whiz kids”, a group of teenagers who became amateur detectives using computer technology to solve mysteries. The show also starred Max Gail as an investigative reporter and A Martinez as the commanding officer of the local police precinct's detective squad.

Although the series experienced a notable backlash from critics for its portrayal of teenage computer hackers, the program garnered four Youth in Film Award nominations for its young stars, as well as a fifth nomination as "Best New Television Series" of 1983.

CBS cancelled Whiz Kids after one season, with 18 episodes produced.

== Production ==
=== Conception ===
Philip DeGuere stated in several 1983 interviews he conceived Whiz Kids after recognizing the importance of computers in his work as a television producer and believed the "new" technology could make an interesting premise for a series. Prior to the series' premiere in October 1983, the premise of teenage computer geniuses hacking into other computers was often compared to, and thought to have been inspired by, that of the film WarGames, which had been released in May 1983 and became a hit during that summer. However, DeGuere repeatedly stated that his idea for the show was originally conceived in 1981 and was subsequently validated when Time magazine named the computer its 1982 "Man of the Year."

Although DeGuere maintained he originated the series idea in 1981, Bob Shayne revealed in an early 2020 podcast interview that the original concept of the show was his "Hardy Boys done right" idea and was pitched to Universal Television in late 1982, with DeGuere adding the computer aspects as well as the series title in the pitch meeting. The series was intended to be shopped to ABC and NBC to compete with CBS's news program 60 Minutes and appeal to a juvenile audience.

The go-ahead was given to write a script and begin developing a pilot before this had even been shopped to a network. CBS unexpectedly picked up the show and in January 1983, commissioned a $2 million pilot which DeGuere and Shayne delivered three months later. CBS was impressed and greenlit the series, announcing it at the May upfronts. When explaining the decision to build the show around high school-age characters, DeGuere stated, "We specifically cast them at an age where it would be fun to watch them grow. [...] If the show clicks, we'll follow them right through college."

=== Development ===
In an attempt to keep the innovative premise plausible, DeGuere hired technical advisors and a computer analyst to supervise and provide input on the stories. When describing the cutting-edge technology that would be depicted on the show, DeGuere stated, "We will be technically accurate without being boring. [...] Whiz Kids is a benign futuristic environment, a year or two ahead of actual computer development. [...] Essentially, the stories are human-centered with every precaution being taken not to allow the computer to take on capabilities beyond the realm of reality, which would spoil the integrity of the stories."

In June 1983, four months prior to the series premiere on CBS, the pilot sparked controversy after it was screened for critics, affiliates, and advertisers at a Phoenix press conference. In response to criticism from advertisers, station owners, and critics, CBS executives had several meetings with the program's producers over the summer to emphasize that storylines should be changed so that access to other computers would be portrayed as being obtained "through legal means." As a result, small changes were made to the original pilot, and two additional adult characters were written into all subsequent episodes: a police detective and a newspaper reporter. These two served to provide the teens with a moral compass as well as access to what would otherwise be considered "classified" information. Specific plotlines were also developed to show the consequences of illegal activities.

== Cast ==
- Matthew Laborteaux as Richie Adler
- Todd Porter as Hamilton "Ham" Parker
- Jeffrey Jacquet as Jeremy Saldino
- Andrea Elson as Alice Tyler
- Melanie Gaffin as Cheryl Adler
- Max Gail as Llewellyn Farley
- A Martinez as Lieutenant Neal Quinn
- Madelyn Cain as Irene Adler
- Linda Scruggs as Ms. Vance

== Premise ==
The Whiz Kids Gang

Richie Adler (Matthew Laborteaux) is a tenth-grader who lives with his mother Irene (Madelyn Cain) and younger sister Cheryl (Melanie Gaffin). His parents are divorced, and his father works overseas as a telecommunications engineer to several firms. Richie is an advanced computer user and receives most of his equipment from his father, who acquires obsolete equipment that is scheduled to be scrapped. Richie collects this equipment and assembles it to form a personal computer he nicknames "Ralf". Ralf has multiple components and capabilities, including a camera that produces a facial identification system.

Richie and his teenage friends, Hamilton "Ham" Parker (Todd Porter), Jeremy Saldino (Jeffrey Jacquet) and Alice Tyler (Andrea Elson) routinely encounter mysteries which they attempt to solve using Richie's computer skills and Ralf's power, often tapping into other computer systems, corporate, governmental and private. The cases often involve money-hungry criminals working inside business corporations or government. Guidance is provided by Llewellen Farley (Max Gail), a reporter for the fictional newspaper the LA Gazette, whose stories are often exposés of crime and corruption. Farley has a cantankerous but mutually beneficial relationship with Lieutenant Neal Quinn (A Martinez) who is head of the local detective unit.

In most episodes, the three groups — the police (mostly led by Quinn), the media (usually Farley), and the Whiz Kids — all contribute to cracking a case and in bringing the criminals to justice. Their relationship is often conflicted, as Quinn must keep Farley from getting too much insider information, while Farley and Quinn both attempt to keep the teens out of danger. However, each case is never solved by one group alone, and they are all usually forced by circumstance to work together, each drawing from their own particular strengths and fields of expertise.

== Broadcast ==
In June 1983, CBS network executives were reportedly planning for Whiz Kids to air in a Saturday night timeslot on their schedule. By August, CBS had reconsidered this and instead had the series targeted as its Wednesday night leadoff program when it was slated to premiere in the fall. However, Philip DeGuere had expressed concerns about a September premiere competing with late-season baseball and was instead advocating for a late October premiere. In mid-September, the decision was made to delay the planned premiere by one week. Whiz Kids premiered on CBS on Wednesday, October 5, 1983, at 8:00 PM Eastern, facing off against the hit action drama The Fall Guy on ABC and the popular reality show Real People on NBC. At midseason, with its ratings faltering, Whiz Kids was moved from Wednesdays to Saturdays to replace the medical drama Cutter to Houston, which had been cancelled after poor ratings for its seven episodes. The first episode after the move aired on Saturday, January 7, 1984.

Keeping the same 8:00 PM time slot it had on Wednesday, Whiz Kids now had competition from two other series aimed at younger viewers, since NBC counter-programmed the hour with the sitcoms Diff'rent Strokes and Silver Spoons. Those two series managed to keep the younger audience that CBS was targeting with the move, and the show also performed poorly against ABC's crime drama T. J. Hooker in the same timeslot.

After the fifth episode in the new timeslot aired on February 4, 1984, CBS removed Whiz Kids from the regular programming lineup, a move that effectively cancelled the series. The remaining five episodes were burned off over the next four months, with the eighteenth and last airing on June 2, 1984.

=== International syndication ===
After its cancellation, Universal offered reruns of Whiz Kids to local stations in the United States for a number of years to air as part of their weekend schedules.

The series was broadcast in the United Kingdom by ITV, and began on 10 March 1984 in a Saturday teatime slot, except for TVS who broadcast the series on a later date and UTV which broadcast the series in a Sunday teatime slot. The series was concluded on 14 July 1984. Whiz Kids screened in New Zealand on TVNZ in 1984. In Japan, it was broadcast by NHK called Maikon Daisakusen (マイコン大作戦, meaning "Microcomputer's big operations") in 1984.

In Finland, the series was broadcast on Mainos-TV (MTV3) under the title Tietokonejengi (Computer Gang) in 1984.

In France, the series was broadcast on Antenne 2 (now France 2) under the title Les Petits Génies (The Little Geniuses) from April 1 until June 24, 1984. In Quebec, it was broadcast on TVA network in 1985.

In Germany, the series was broadcast on RTL Plus under the title Computer Kids from January until April 1989.

In Italy, the series was broadcast on Italia 1 under the title I Ragazzi del Computer (The Computer Guys) from 1985 until 1990.

In Argentina, the series was broadcast on ATC (now TV Pública) a year after its premiere in USA, under the title La Pandilla de la Computadora (The Computer Gang).

== Technology ==
Ralf itself (or 'himself' as Richie's friends call it) is a conglomeration of different machines and special effects work. In Episode 11, Richie complains that a potential Ralf-substitute does not have a disk drive, 48k, interrupts, or error correction, implying Ralf has at least these. In Episode 17, Richie mentions that Ralf is "a 64k homebrewed computer". A collection of 5.25 inch floppy disks can be seen in several episodes. Ralf also has a modem. The pilot shows Ralf as having a digital camera and a bitmapped color graphics display. Ralf's speech synthesis capabilities are also displayed in several episodes. Prior to the premiere episode, DeGuere described the technology behind Ralf's speech capabilities, saying "Ralf has a Votrax voice synthesizer chip. When it 'talks', it's really a computer, not an actor's voice that viewers will hear."

Activities engaged in by the teenagers on the series include wardialing, editing hexadecimal machine code in a hex editor, brute force password cracking, denial-of-service attacks, facial recognition, speech recognition and speech synthesis, image enhancement, social engineering, and even computer dating.

The series prominently features a variety of computer equipment from the 1970s and 1980s that act as props in the show. Some of these machines include a Gavilan portable computer, a Heath Hero robot kit, an Apple II, an Apple IIe, a Dynalogic Hyperion, an IMSAI PCS 80/30, an Enigma Machine, Commodore PET (in a classroom of the kids' school), an IBM 3279 terminal painted in black (pilot episode), and a TRS-80 Model 100.

Several pioneer companies of the personal computer industry were listed in the credits as providing technical support. Some are still around (as of 2010) but many have disappeared. They include Apple Computer, Autodesk, Bytec Comterm, Computer Components Unlimited, Commodore Business Machines, Heath/Zenith Data Systems, CTT Data Systems, Heath Co., Dale Wilson / Code Right, GRiD Systems Corporation, Hitachi America, Interlisp, Microbot, Magnavox, Mattel Electronics, Photonics Technology, RadioShack, Action Computer Enterprise, Televideo Systems, Atari home computer division (makers of Atari 8-bit computers), Paul Lutus, Proton Corporation, Tycom Corporation, Office Systems by Xerox Corp and Xerox Electro-Optical Company.

== Music ==
While electronic musical pieces make up most of the background music for the show, a number of riffs are based on classical music. The main theme is an arrangement of the first movement of Mozart's Piano Concerto #21 in C Major, and excerpts play throughout the series. Rossini's overture from the Barber of Seville is also used repeatedly. Tchaikovsky's 'Love Theme' from Romeo and Juliet is used in one episode to cue Richie's romantic involvements.

== U.S. television ratings ==
Season	Episodes	Originally released (U.S.)		Rank	Rating	References
Season	Episodes	First released	Last released	Rank	Rating	References
1	18	October 5, 1983	June 2, 1984	81	11.4	

== Episodes ==
No.	Title	Directed by	Written by	Original release date	Prod. code
1	"Programmed for Murder"	Corey Allen	Philip DeGuere & Bob Shayne	October 5, 1983	83497
The Whiz Kids discover a suspicious skeleton on property coveted by corporate developers. Guest appearances: Michael Horton, Jonathan Banks, James Whitmore, Jr., and Don Dubbins.
2	"Fatal Error"	Corey Allen	Tom Sawyer	October 19, 1983	58009
The Whiz Kids unwittingly help a computer programmer to escape from prison. Guest appearances: Mabel King, Joanna Kerns, and David Ackroyd.
3	"Deadly Access"	Corey Allen	James Crocker	October 26, 1983	58008
The Whiz Kids are hired to test computer security for a chemical company and uncover a secret project. Guest appearances: Greg Mullavey, Richard Anderson, Tricia O'Neil, Gary Frank, and Jameson Parker (Simon & Simon crossover).
4	"Candidate for Murder"	Bernard L. Kowalski	Bob Shayne	November 2, 1983	58005
The Whiz Kids use computer enhancement of a photograph to reveal a gubernatorial candidate with a fugitive embezzler. Guest appearances: Michael Young, James Luisi, Vonetta McGee, and Tom Simcox
5	"A Chip Off the Old Block"	Vincent McEveety	Philip DeGuere	November 9, 1983	58007
The Whiz Kids discover that a student has been framed for embezzlement by a bank employee. Guest appearances: Daryl Anderson, Robbie Rist, Darryl Hickman, and Jackie Earle Haley.
6	"Airwave Anarchy"	James Sheldon	Joe Gannon	November 16, 1983	58011
The Whiz Kids investigate a malfunctioning police computer that's been sabotaged to prevent police responses to robberies. Guest appearances: Guy Stockwell, Allan Miller, Anthony James, and Barbara Cason.
7	"Return of the Big Rocker"	Barry Crane	Paul Magistretti	November 23, 1983	58012
The Whiz Kids encounter a record company planning to market faked recordings by a presumably dead rock star. Guest appearances: Marjoe Gortner and Sal Viscuso.
8	"The Wrong Mr. Wright"	Michael Hamilton	S : Arthur Weingarten & Bob Shayne; T : Phil Combest	November 30, 1983	58010
The Whiz Kids enroll Richie's mother in a computer dating service which leads to the investigation of a suicide. Guest appearances: Warwick Sims, Scott Stevensen, Anthony Charnota, and Jourdan Fremin.
9	"Red Star Rising"	John Newland	T : Joe Gannon; S/T : Andy Guerdat & Steve Kreinberg	December 21, 1983	58004
The Whiz Kids' computer malfunctions due to interference caused by a neighbor's satellite dish. Guest appearances: Christopher Stone, John Pleshette, and William Hootkins.
10	"The Network"	Hollingsworth Morse	James Crocker, & Philip DeGuere	January 7, 1984	58024
The Whiz Kids encounter trouble after accessing data from the National Security Agency. Guest appearances: Wayne Morton, Barbara Brownell, Michael Boyle, Joe Hacker, and Jim McMullan.
11	"Watch Out!"	Dennis Donnelly	James Crocker	January 14, 1984	58022
The Whiz Kids investigate when a consumer advocate claims that his TV series' ratings are being torpedoed. Guest appearances: Gerrit Graham, Eric Server, Belinda Montgomery, David Groh, Eddie Barth, and Jeff Corey.
12	"Amen to Amen-Re"	Alf Kjellin	Paul Magistretti	January 28, 1984	58023
The Whiz Kids uncover an ancient Egyptian curse which may account for Farley's uncharacteristic behavior. Guest appearances: Kay Lenz, William Boyett, and Zelda Rubinstein.
13	"Maid in the USA"	Max Gail	James Crocker	February 4, 1984	58027
The Whiz Kids find that Richie's house is being bugged, which may be linked to the family's new maid. Guest appearances: June Lockhart, Reid Shelton, and Dan O'Herlihy.
14	"The Lollypop Gang Strikes Back"	Dennis Donnelly	Lynn Barker	February 25, 1984	58031
The Whiz Kids help investigate a case involving a gang of senior citizens robbing small markets. Guest appearances: Sylvia Sidney, Elisha Cook, Whitman Mayo, Kenneth Mars, and Dan O'Herlihy.
15	"The Sufi Project"	Georg Fenady	S : Philip DeGuere & James Crocker; T : Don Boudry	March 17, 1984	58026
The Whiz Kids unravel the mystery of the disappearance of a marine biologist. Guest appearances: Pamela Susan Shoop, Keene Curtis, M. C. Gainey, and Dan O'Herlihy.
16	"Father's Day"	Hollingsworth Morse	Craig Buck	April 21, 1984	58032
The Whiz Kids investigate when they discover Alice's new boyfriend is being sought by a KGB agent. Guest appearances: John Reilly, Brad Savage, Peter Brown, Sharon Acker, Jim McKrell, Bruce M. Fischer, and Dan O'Herlihy.
17	"Altaira"	Georg Fenady	S : Jill Gordon; T : Lynn Barker	April 28, 1984	58029
The Whiz Kids believe Richie's new girlfriend may not be all she appears. Guest appearances: Tammy Taylor, Scott Brady, Alex Kubik, and Dan O'Herlihy.
18	"May I Take Your Order Please?"	Lawrence Levy	Tim Maschler	June 2, 1984	58002
The Whiz Kids disbelieve Alice when she claims to have overheard two men planning a murder. Guest appearances: Charles Napier, Bart Braverman, Larry Gelman, and Sandy Helberg.

== Reception ==
=== Critical reception ===
The pilot received mixed to negative reviews, with most critics acknowledging that younger viewers would probably like the show, but expressing concern regarding the example(s) set for them. Chicago Tribune critic Marilynn Preston wrote, "Mostly it will be children and teens and young adults who may come to love this series [and] that's a big part of the problem. [...] These cute kids illegally access and search their school's computer, the private files of the county clerk's office and the computer system of a large newspaper in Los Angeles. [...] Instead of appealing, the first episode pilot of Whiz Kids is appalling."

New York Times critic John J. O'Connor felt similarly, writing "Whiz Kids is a kiddie show, the kind of product that should be shown on Saturday mornings or late afternoons. Richie and his friends are constantly hopping on and off their bicycles as, with the help of a local newspaper reporter, they set about solving rather far-fetched mysteries. Using such computer devices as "image recognition program," they "access" programs ranging from school schedules to the Southern California Title and Survey Commission. [CBS] is insisting that Whiz Kids will be all fun and games and that it will not give youngsters any questionable ideas. Coming on the heels of the recent movie WarGames, that remains to be seen."

Associated Press critic Fred Rothenberg echoed the sentiment, writing "Whiz Kids does not make a whimper on the sex-and-violence scale, yet it may be more dangerous to children than anything on television this season. [O]ur adolescent heroes – sort of Hardy Boys high on silicon chips – engage, willy-nilly, in assorted illegal activities: computer tampering, driving without licenses and grave-robbing. Even though some of this law-breaking may be construed as adolescent pranks, and all of it is done in the name of crime-fighting, none of it serves well as TV role model behavior."

Pittsburgh Press critic Barbara Holsopple perceived the same problems, writing "The season's most disturbing new series debuts tonight. Before the hour is through, Whiz Kids glorifies theft by computer, breaking and entering, and car theft by underage drivers. [...] Yes, the young actors are talented and clever and cute, [but] Whiz Kids glorifies crime. It makes heroes of its young criminals. It's [sic] premise is rooted in the message that anybody's computer system is fair game so long as the end justifies the means. And with an 8 P.M. time slot and a cast of young people, its target audience is children."

Montreal Gazette writer Mike Boone gave the series premiere its one positive review, writing "To enjoy Whiz Kids – and I think a lot of people will – viewers will have to suspend disbelief and buy the show's rather far-out premise. [...] The Whiz Kids are a likeable bunch, even when they are casually invading data banks to access private information. Although it was a murder story, the debut episode was admirably devoid of real violence. And viewers of all ages who are intrigued by computers are going to love watching Ralf do his stuff. When you consider the types of TV programs aimed at young viewers in recent seasons, Whiz Kids represents a giant leap forward in intelligence and sophistication. It is one of the better shows of the new season."

In an interview published in the February 1984 issue of Starlog, series co-creator and executive producer Philip DeGuere responded to the controversies and criticism leveled at the show, stating "My show has received a great deal of criticism which has offended me. [...] We are dealing with minors and, therefore, are subject to forms of criticism which are not applied to features or other series not dealing with minors. Some people think that a teenager-who-does-something is a much more potent role model for teenagers than an adult. I don't agree, I don't think a teenager will be more influenced by Matthew Broderick in WarGames than Tom Selleck in Magnum, P.I., or Dustin Hoffman in Tootsie."

=== Teen reception ===
Despite the reception from adult critics, the series established its young stars, particularly Matthew Laborteaux and Todd Porter, as popular teen idols of the mid-1980s, with pinups and articles appearing in numerous teen magazines, including 16 magazine, Bop and Teen Beat, among others. While Laborteaux had already garnered notoriety among teen audiences for his role as Albert Ingalls on the NBC family frontier drama, Little House on the Prairie, Whiz Kids launched Porter as a new fixture in the various teen magazines of the era. Prompted by reader response to the 15-year-old, in the spring of 1984 Teen Beat reported on Porter's newfound popularity, writing "With the success of Whiz Kids, [Porter's] life as an average American kid is over. Now, he's going to have to deal with the problems and bonuses of being a genuine teen heartthrob."

=== Accolades ===
Year	Award	Category	Recipient	Result	Ref.
1983	Youth in Film Award (now known as the Young Artist Award)	Best New Television Series	Whiz Kids	Nominated	
1983	Youth in Film Award (now known as the Young Artist Award)	Best Young Actor in a New Television Series	Matthew Laborteaux	Nominated	
1983	Youth in Film Award (now known as the Young Artist Award)	Best Young Actor in a New Television Series	Todd Porter	Nominated	
1983	Youth in Film Award (now known as the Young Artist Award)	Best Young Actor in a Comedy Series	Jeffrey Jacquet	Nominated	
1983	Youth in Film Award (now known as the Young Artist Award)	Best Young Actress in a New Television Series	Melanie Gaffin	Nominated	

== Related media ==
On October 27, 1983, "Ralf" and the teenage Whiz Kids made a crossover appearance on DeGuere's other executive produced detective series, Simon & Simon. In the episode, entitled "Fly the Alibi Skies", the adolescent crime-solvers use Ralf to assist the Simon brothers in capturing a murderer by hacking into a computer network linked to San Diego International Airport. This "special appearance" by the teenage stars followed the preceding night's episode of Whiz Kids, entitled "Deadly Access" in which Jameson Parker made a crossover appearance as his Simon & Simon character, A.J. Simon.

Whiz Kids is frequently seen on Mexican television throughout the second season of the HBO series Eastbound & Down.

== DVD release ==
The show has been released on DVD in France with EAN 3348467301948. The release contains only 13 of the 18 episodes: 1-9 and 11–14. The conversion to PAL was poorly done and there is a lot of frame blending and chroma flickering. Both French and the original English audio are included except on episodes 8, 9, and 11 from disk 3 which have only French audio. The opening credits have been retitled in French.

To date, the show has not been released in the United States.
