= Jeffrey Jacquet =

American actor (b. 1966)

- Born: Jeffrey Michael Jacquet; October 15, 1966 (age 58); Bay City, Texas, U.S.
- Occupation: Actor
- Years active: 1978–1987

Jeffrey Michael Jacquet (born October 15, 1966) is a former American actor perhaps best known for his television roles as Eugene in the first season of the ABC sitcom Mork & Mindy and as Jeremy Saldino on the CBS science-fiction adventure series Whiz Kids.

== Life and career ==
Jacquet started his career as a child actor in 1978 in the films Return from Witch Mountain and Bloodbrothers. Later that year, he was cast as Eugene in the first season of Mork & Mindy. Eugene was a 12-year-old kid who was a friend of Mork's, and took violin lessons from Cora, Mindy's grandmother. Jacquet was let go after the first season, when the producers decided to take the show in another direction. When he left the show, he went on to appear in a handful of other projects including Wholly Moses! and Whiz Kids, as well as appearances in television shows such as The Jeffersons, Simon & Simon and Our House.

Since retiring from acting, Jacquet has been working as a lawyer in Los Angeles, California since 1993.

== Filmography ==
Film and Television
Year	Title	Role	Notes
1978	Return from Witch Mountain	Rocky	Feature film
1978	Bloodbrothers	Derek	Feature film
1978–79	Mork & Mindy	Eugene	Main role (10 episodes)
1979	The Lazarus Syndrome	St. Clair Son	Television film
1980	Wholly Moses!	Young Pharaoh	Feature film
1981	Sanford	Eddie	Episode: "To Keep a Thief"
1981	The Jeffersons	Leonard	Episode: "A Whole Lot of Trouble"
1983	Simon & Simon	Jeremy Saldino	Episode: "Fly the Alibi Skies"
1983–84	Whiz Kids	Jeremy Saldino	Main role (18 episodes)
1987	Our House	Unknown	Episode: "A Silent, Fallen Tree"
