= Ronald Hunter =

American actor (1943–2013)

- Born: Ronald Lee Hunter; June 14, 1943; Boston, Massachusetts, U.S.
- Died: December 3, 2013 (aged 70); Los Angeles, California, U.S.
- Other name: Ron Hunter
- Education: University of Pennsylvania (BA); New York University (MFA)
- Occupation: Actor
- Years active: 1977–2013
- Children: 3

Ronald Lee "Ron" Hunter (June 14, 1943 – December 3, 2013) was an American actor, whose career spanned nearly five decades in television, film and theater.

== Early life and education ==
Hunter was born in Boston, Massachusetts, and raised in the suburb of Brookline. He earned a Bachelor of Arts degree from the University of Pennsylvania, and a Master of Fine Arts degree from New York University.

== Career ==
Until 1979, he performed roles in mostly New York City stage productions, like Lord Hastings in the Broadway production of Richard III.

He portrayed a minor role in the 1979 film The Seduction of Joe Tynan, starring Alan Alda.

Most of his credits were television appearances. He appeared in One Life to Live, the PBS docudrama The Edelin Conversation as Dr. Kenneth Edelin, and Kojak as "a perennial undergraduate". His first major television appearance was The Lazarus Syndrome, co-starring Louis Gossett Jr. He also co-starred in the 1980s PBS miniseries, Three Sovereigns for Sarah, and the pilot film of the CBS series Cagney and Lacey as Harvey Lacey. He portrayed one of the case suspects in the 1988 made-for-television film Internal Affairs, starring Richard Crenna. He also appeared in Along Came Polly (2004), Law & Order (1991) and The Big Bang Theory (2008).

== Death ==
Hunter died of heart and kidney failure on December 3, 2013, aged 70, at the Woodland Hills Medical Center in Los Angeles, California. He was survived by his three children, two grandchildren and sister.

== Filmography ==
=== Film ===
Ronald Hunter film credits
| Year | Title | Role |
|---|---|---|
| 1979 | The Seduction of Joe Tynan | TV News Director |
| 1984 | Teachers | Mr. Pilkian |
| 1988 | Jakarta | Dolph |
| 2002 | Van Wilder | Gus |
| 2014 | Along Came Polly | Peanut Vendor |

=== Television ===
Ronald Hunter television credits
| Year | Title | Role | Notes |
|---|---|---|---|
| 1979 | The Lazarus Syndrome | Joe Hamill | TV movie |
| 1979 | The Lazarus Syndrome | Joe Hamill | 5 episodes |
| 1981 | Cagney and Lacey | Harvey Lacey | Episode: "Pilot" |
| 1983 | Magnum, P.I. | Emmet Donner | 1 episode |
| 1985 | Three Sovereigns for Sarah | Samuel Nurse | TV miniseries |
| 1988 | The Equalizer | Mr. Binder | Episode: "Something Green" |
| 1988 | Internal Affairs | Mario Graselli | TV movie |
| 1991 | Law & Order | Pilefsky's Defense Attorney | Episode: "The Torrents of Greed" (Parts 1 & 2) |
| 2008 | The Big Bang Theory | Dan | 1 episode |
| 2008 | Monk | Dan | 1 episode |
