= Mark Ritts =

American actor, puppeteer, producer, and director (1946–2019)

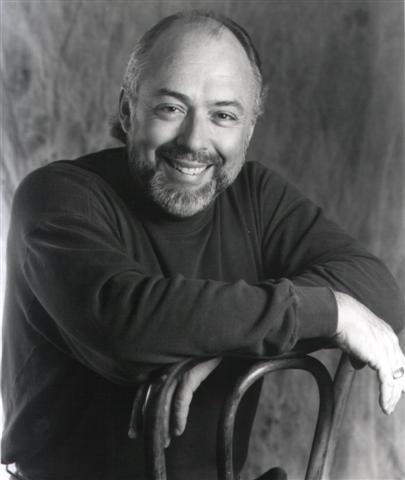
- Born: June 16, 1946; West Chester, Pennsylvania, U.S
- Died: December 7, 2009 (aged 63); La Cañada Flintridge, California, U.S
- Occupations: Actor, puppeteer, television producer and director, and author
- Known for: President of Mark Ritts Productions, Inc.
- Notable work: The Real Adventures of Sherlock Jones and Proctor Watson, The Pink Panther Show, Starstuff, Storytime, Beakman's World, Barney the Dinosaur
- Spouse(s): Nina Daniel (divorced); Teresa Parente (?-2009 his death)
- Children: 3

Mark Ritts (June 16, 1946 – December 7, 2009) was an American actor, puppeteer, television producer and director, and author. Ritts also produced and directed many independent videos and television spots as president of Mark Ritts Productions, Inc., for clients around the world.

== Biography ==
Ritts was born in West Chester, Pennsylvania. He graduated from Harvard with a degree in English literature. Being the son of noted puppeteers Paul and Mary Ritts, he pursued a sideline in puppetry, starring in PBS's The Real Adventures of Sherlock Jones and Proctor Watson and NBC's The Pink Panther Show, among many others. In the 1980s he was the puppeteer for the Philadelphia-area produced Starstuff.

Throughout the 1990s, Ritts was the voice and performer of Kino, the Emmy Award-winning puppet co-host of the PBS series Storytime, as well as one of the show's writers.

From 1992 to 1998, he participated on CBS's Beakman's World. In it, Ritts starred as Lester, a disgruntled actor (with a bad agent) in a rat suit who reluctantly helps Beakman with his experiments and trades barbs with Josie, Liza and Phoebe. The character was originally conceived as a puppet character, but at the last minute, the show's producers decided he would be a costumed actor. Ritts also operated the Herb penguin puppet, with the voice provided by Alan Barzman. The program has been televised in nearly 90 countries around the world, and is seen in syndication throughout the United States.

After moving to California from the East Coast in 1994, Mark wrote and produced a Barney the Dinosaur special for Fox, as well as a one-hour documentary on microbiology called Creators of the Future, which debuted in prime time on PBS in 1999.

Ritts is also the co-author (with Don Fleming, PhD) of a parenting book entitled Mom, I Hate You, released by Three Rivers/Random House in April 2003. In July 2005, he and co-producer/writer/director Ted Field released Cast Off for Catalina, a DVD about visiting and enjoying southern California's Santa Catalina Island aboard your own boat. A second DVD, Cast Off for Mexico, was released in 2007. Ritts provided the voice for the character Gianciotto in the 2007 film Dante's Inferno.

He made a major high-definition documentary for Merck & Co. and creative directed an elaborate conference for Carlson Hotels at Las Vegas's Bellagio Resort and Casino. He was also a director of the Court TV series North Mission Road.

== Death ==
Ritts died from kidney cancer in La Cañada Flintridge, California. He was 63 years old.

== Family ==
He was married to actress and singer Teresa Parente and had a daughter. He was previously married to Nina Daniel and they had two sons.
