= Beakman's World =

American educational television program

- Based on: You Can with Beakman and Jax by Jok Church
- Presented by: Paul Zaloom
- Starring: Mark Ritts; Alanna Ubach (season 1); Eliza Schneider (seasons 2–3); Senta Moses (season 4)
- Composers: Mark Mothersbaugh; Denis M. Hannigan; Rusty Andrews
- Country of origin: United States
- Original language: English
- No. of seasons: 4
- No. of episodes: 91

Production
- Executive producer: Mark Waxman
- Producers: Marijane Miller; Richard Albrecht; Casey Keller
- Running time: 22 minutes
- Production companies: ELP Communications; Universal/Belo Productions; Columbia Pictures Television Distribution; Columbia TriStar Television

Original release
- Network: TLC
- Release: September 16, 1992 – March 3, 1993
- Network: Syndication
- Release: September 19, 1992 – May 22, 1993
- Network: CBS
- Release: September 18, 1993 – December 6, 1997

Beakman's World is an American educational children's television program. The program is based on the Universal Press Syndicate syndicated comic strip You Can with Beakman and Jax created by Jok Church. The series premiered on Wednesday, September 16, 1992, on TLC, and three days later on September 19, began a concurrent run in weekly syndication on 220 television stations across the United States through an agreement with Columbia Pictures Television Distribution (whose indirect successor, Sony Pictures Television, currently maintains domestic and international distribution rights to the series).

On September 18, 1993, it moved from national syndication to CBS's Saturday morning children's lineup. At the peak of its popularity, it was seen in nearly ninety countries around the world. The series was canceled in 1997. Reruns returned to national syndication in September 2006, after which it was transferred to local stations such as KICU. The program's host, Paul Zaloom, still performs as Beakman in live appearances around the globe.

== Summary ==
The program starred Paul Zaloom as Beakman, an eccentric scientist who performed comical experiments and demonstrations in response to viewer mail to illustrate various scientific concepts from density to electricity to flatulence. When his experiments were successful, he would often exclaim "Zaloom!" in a nod to his last name.

Over the years, Beakman was aided in his experiments by a female assistant/co-host just as in the comic strip on which it was based. The assistant changed throughout the show's run; for season 1, it was Josie (played by Alanna Ubach); for seasons 2 and 3, it was Liza (played by Eliza Schneider); and for season 4, it was Phoebe (played by Senta Moses). Beakman was also assisted by his fake lab rat Lester. In the pilot episode, Lester was a puppet, but in every subsequent episode he was simply a clueless, crude man (Mark Ritts) in a tattered rat suit. In a running joke, it was sometimes implied that his character was actually supposed to be a rat, particularly in moments where he would appear to be in pain because someone was standing on his tail, because he was being tickled, something was on his prosthetic nose, etc. Just as frequently, however, he was specifically identified by himself and others as a guy in a rat suit, or as a serious actor with a bad agent. Frequently unwilling to help with challenges or other segments, Lester was often persuaded by Beakman with the promise of food.

Another occasional cast member is the unseen cameraman "Ray", who is played by prop-master Ron Jancula's hands. Ray assists Beakman by handing him various items, such as the "boguscope". It is suggested throughout the program that Ray has a crush on the show's unnamed make-up lady. Actress Jean Stapleton also appeared on the show as Beakman's mother, "Beakmom". In some of the skits during the show the character Professor I. M. Boring (also played by Paul Zaloom, in a dual role) makes appearances and talks about various science topics in the episodes.

Zaloom also appeared as various "guest scientists" and historic figures, such as Thomas A. Edison, Henry Ford, Robert H. Goddard and Philo T. Farnsworth. When Senta Moses was added to the show's cast, the producers began to use a majority of the sound effects from the NBC game show Scrabble.

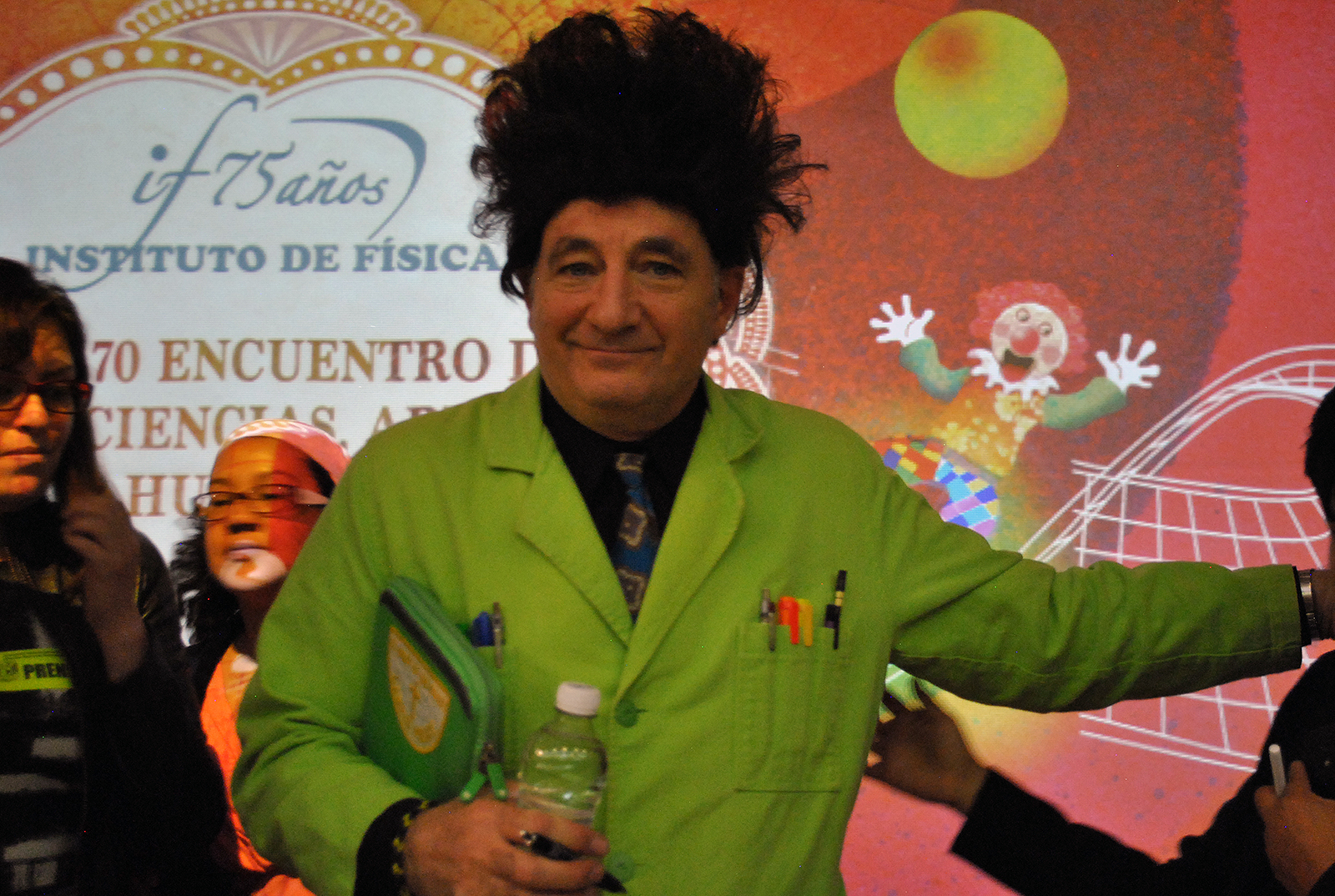
Paul Zaloom costumed as Beakman in UNAM, 2014.

One segment of the show was the famed "Beakman Challenge". During this segment, Beakman would challenge Lester to do a stunt that illustrated a basic scientific feat. During the first season, virtually every challenge related to either air pressure or Bernoulli's principle. The show addressed this sometime in the middle of the first season, by having Lester exclaim to Beakman (as he was explaining the science behind a trick) "AIR PRESSURE! IT'S ALWAYS AIR PRESSURE!" In later episodes, the rest of the cast would sometimes have their turn to perform a "Beakman Challenge" under their own name (e.g. "The Lester Challenge" or "The Liza Challenge", etc.) and challenge Beakman to accomplish the feat. When Eliza Schneider joined the cast for season 2, she would get her own segment in the middle of each show called "Those Disgusting Animals" where Liza would showcase small animals such as slugs or mosquitoes.

Before an experiment, the following verbal warning was given: "Any experiment performed at home should be done with adult supervision and all appropriate safety precautions should be taken. All directions should be followed exactly and no substitutions should be used." The same warning was given during the end credits.

At the beginning and end of the show, as well as before or after commercial breaks, the show featured short scenes portraying puppet penguins, Don (voiced by Bert Berdis) and Herb (voiced by Alan Barzman), at the South Pole watching Beakman's World on television. The penguins were named after Don Herbert, who starred as Mr. Wizard in Mr. Wizard's World. Mark Ritts (Lester) was also one of the puppeteers operating the penguins.

The show's theme song and incidental music was composed by Devo frontman Mark Mothersbaugh and Denis M. Hannigan. The Beakman's World theme is an amalgam of Zydeco and Synthpop, uses an accordion for its main riff and prominently features a wide array of wacky sound effects. (Mothersbaugh and the show's production designer, Wayne White, had previously worked in the same roles on Pee-wee's Playhouse which also aired on CBS.)

== Cast ==
- Paul Zaloom as Beakman (Seasons 1–4)
- Mark Ritts as Lester (Seasons 1–4)
- Alanna Ubach as Josie (Season 1)
- Eliza Schneider as Liza (Seasons 2–3)
- Senta Moses as Phoebe (Season 4)
- Alan Barzman as Herb Penguin
- Bert Berdis as Don Penguin

== Episodes ==
=== Series overview ===
Season	Episodes	Originally released	
Season	Episodes	First released	Last released
1	26	September 16, 1992	May 22, 1993
2	26	September 18, 1993	December 3, 1994
3	13	September 16, 1995	December 2, 1995
4	26	September 14, 1996	December 6, 1997

=== Season 1 (1992–1993) ===
No. overall	No. in season	Title	Original release date
1	1	"Rain, Beakmania & Volcanoes"	September 16, 1992 (TLC); September 19, 1992 (syndication)
2	2	"Gravity, Beakmania & Inertia"	September 26, 1992
3	3	"Noises at Night, Beakmania & The Nose"	October 3, 1992
4	4	"Blood, Beakmania & Dreams"	October 10, 1992
5	5	"Leaves, Beakmania & Paper"	October 17, 1992
6	6	"Soap, Beakmania & Auto Engines"	October 24, 1992
7	7	"Electricity, Beakmania & Light Bulbs"	October 31, 1992
8	8	"Sound, Beakmania & Explosions"	November 7, 1992
9	9	"Refraction, Beakmania & Attraction"	November 14, 1992
10	10	"Levers, Beakmania & Television"	November 21, 1992
11	11	"Boats, Beakmania & Airplanes"	November 28, 1992
12	12	"Bubbles, Beakmania & Feet"	January 23, 1993
13	13	"Microscopes, Beakmania & Healing"	January 30, 1993
14	14	"Scientific Method, Beakmania & Rainbows"	February 6, 1993
15	15	"Vaccinations, Beakmania & Friction"	February 13, 1993
16	16	"Thermodynamics, Beakmania & Pimples"	February 20, 1993
17	17	"Fossils, Beakmania & the Human Voice"	February 27, 1993
18	18	"Lungs, Beakmania & Telephones"	March 6, 1993
19	19	"Tape Recordings, Beakmania & Force Vs. Pressure"	February 3, 1993 (TLC); April 3, 1993 (syndication)
20	20	"Microwaves, Beakmania & Spiders"	April 10, 1993
21	21	"Earwax, Beakmania & Rocket Engines"	February 17, 1993 (TLC); April 17, 1993 (syndication)
22	22	"Ozone, Beakmania & Acid"	February 24, 1993 (TLC); April 24, 1993 (syndication)
23	23	"Plumbing, Beakmania & Roller Coasters"	March 3, 1993 (TLC); May 1, 1993 (syndication)
24	24	"Bees, Beakmania & Earthquakes"	May 8, 1993
25	25	"Reflection, Beakmania & Madame Curie"	May 15, 1993
26	26	"Wheels, Beakmania & Finding Answers"	May 22, 1993

=== Season 2 (1993–1994) ===
No. overall	No. in season	Title	Original release date
27	1	"Submarines, Beakmania & Digestion"	September 18, 1993
28	2	"Heart, Beakmania & Helicopters"	September 25, 1993
29	3	"Batteries, Beakmania & Balloons"	October 2, 1993
30	4	"Tunnels, Beakmania & Trains"	October 16, 1993
31	5	"Bats, Beakmania & Energy"	October 30, 1993
32	6	"Sky, Beakmania & Henry Ford"	October 23, 1993
33	7	"Sound, Beakmania & Illusions"	November 6, 1993
34	8	"Lightning, Beakmania & Bones"	November 13, 1993
35	9	"Moon, Beakmania & Elevators"	November 20, 1993
36	10	"Video Games, Beakmania & Teeth"	November 27, 1993
37	11	"Check-Up Time, Beakmania & Oil"	December 25, 1993
38	12	"Ben Franklin, Beakmania & Chemical Reactions"	February 5, 1994
39	13	"Ants, Beakmania & Collisions"	February 26, 1994
40	14	"Pain, Beakmania & Comets"	October 15, 1994
41	15	"Hydraulics, Beakmania & Dinosaurs"	October 29, 1994
42	16	"Electric Motors, Beakmania & Time"	December 3, 1994
43	17	"Frogs and Toads, Beakmania & Polymers"	October 1, 1994
44	18	"Money, Beakmania & Water Power"	November 12, 1994
45	19	"Garbage, Beakmania & Meteorology"	November 26, 1994
46	20	"Skyscrapers, Beakmania & Indicators"	November 19, 1994
47	21	"Sharks, Beakmania & Einstein"	November 5, 1994
48	22	"Mold, Beakmania & Caves"	April 16, 1994
49	23	"Momentum, Beakmania & Cows"	September 24, 1994
50	24	"Allergies, Beakmania & Codes"	October 8, 1994
51	25	"Snakes, Beakmania & Seasons"	October 22, 1994
52	26	"Tornadoes, Beakmania & Firefighting"	September 17, 1994

=== Season 3 (1995) ===
No. overall	No. in season	Title	Original release date
53	1	"Seeds, Beakmania & Bridges"	October 7, 1995
54	2	"Balance, Beakmania & Camouflage"	November 4, 1995
55	3	"Carbon, Beakmania & Inventions"	October 28, 1995
56	4	"Gyroscopes, Beakmania & the Heart"	September 23, 1995
57	5	"Steel, Beakmania & Developing Film"	December 2, 1995
58	6	"The Sun, Beakmania & Metamorphosis"	November 18, 1995
59	7	"Vacuums, Beakmania & Weaving"	October 14, 1995
60	8	"Snow, Beakmania & Natural Selection"	December 9, 1995
61	9	"Alligators and Crocodiles, Beakmania & Robots"	November 25, 1995
62	10	"Geysers and Hot Springs, Beakmania & Kidneys"	September 16, 1995
63	11	"Sleep, Beakmania & Amplification"	September 30, 1995
64	12	"Crustaceans, Beakmania & Bernoulli"	October 21, 1995
65	13	"Islands, Beakmania & Energy"	November 11, 1995

=== Season 4 (1996–1997) ===
No. overall	No. in season	Title	Original release date
66	1	"Sweat, Beakmania & Weighing a Car"	September 14, 1996
67	2	"Migration, Beakmania & Living Space"	September 21, 1996
68	3	"Bunsen, Beakmania & Sewage"	October 5, 1996
69	4	"Cats, Beakmania & Dynamite"	November 8, 1997
70	5	"The Mouth, Beakmania & Scale"	October 19, 1996
71	6	"Catalysts, Beakmania & Aerosol Cans"	September 20, 1997
72	7	"Rubber, Beakmania & Hair"	December 14, 1996
73	8	"Camels, Beakmania & Density"	November 29, 1997
74	9	"Boomerangs, Beakmania & Circus Science"	January 18, 1997
75	10	"Elephants, Beakmania & X-Rays"	September 28, 1996
76	11	"Skin, Beakmania & Oxygen"	November 30, 1996
77	12	"Bread, Beakmania & Measurement"	November 16, 1996
78	13	"Electromagnets, Beakmania & Senses"	November 9, 1996
79	14	"Chimps, Beakmania & Eye Exams"	September 13, 1997
80	15	"Magic, Beakmania & Cosmetic Chemistry"	December 28, 1996
81	16	"Pigs, Beakmania & Sound Frequency"	September 27, 1997
82	17	"Sunken Treasure, Beakmania & Archimedian [sic] Screw"	October 11, 1997
83	18	"Whales, Beakmania & Optical Illusions II"	October 18, 1997
84	19	"Sound Barrier, Beakmania & Healthy Living"	October 25, 1997
85	20	"Polar Exploration, Beakmania & Circular Motion"	October 4, 1997
86	21	"Dogs, Beakmania & Bio-Medical Engineering"	January 11, 1997
87	22	"Human Growth, Beakmania & Solutions and Suspensions"	November 15, 1997
88	23	"Action-Reaction, Beakmania & Talking Birds"	November 22, 1997
89	24	"Protozoology, Beakmania & Movie Stunts"	December 6, 1997
90	25	"Horses, Beakmania & Refrigerators"	November 1, 1997
91	26	"Fingerprints, Beakmania & Flatulence"	January 4, 1997

== Home media ==
On September 7, 2004, a DVD entitled The Best of Beakman's World was released by Columbia TriStar Home Entertainment. This DVD is a direct transfer of the VHS tape of the same name, and features only experiments and segments taken from The Beakman Challenge. There have yet to be any full-episode releases on DVD.

All 4 seasons were formerly available on Netflix with the exception of the following five episodes: 9 (1-9), 24 (1-24), 31 (2-5), 51 (2-25) and 66 (4-1), as noted in the chart above. Their streaming license ended on September 30, 2014, and the content was removed from their site. Beakman's World returned to television on MeTV beginning on October 2, 2016, showing two episodes every Sunday.

As of 2026, the series is currently available for streaming online on The Roku Channel and the Indoor Recess YouTube channel (managed by Sony Pictures).

== Awards ==
Beakman's World was nominated for and won numerous awards:

- Excellence in Media's Silver Angel Award (1993)
- International Monitor Award for Outstanding Audio Post Production (1993)
- Television Critics Association nomination for Outstanding Children's Program (1993)
- Ollie Award - American Center for Children's Television (1993)
- Parent's Choice Award for Outstanding Accomplishment in Children's Programming (1993)
- Daytime Emmy Award for Outstanding Achievement in Live and Tape Sound Mixing and Sound Effects (1993–1994)
- CableACE Award for Best Children's Programming 7+ older (1994)
- International Monitor Awards for Best Achievement in Children's Programming and Best Audio Post *Production in Children's Programming (1994)
- Nominated for Seven Daytime Emmy Awards including Outstanding Children's Series (1995)
- Daytime Emmy Awards (2) for Outstanding Achievement in Live and Tape Sound and Sound Effects (1994–1995).

== Exhibit ==
In 1998, the Cincinnati Museum Center at Union Terminal opened an interactive exhibit called Beakman's World On Tour, based on the television show. The 4,000-square-foot (370 m^{2}) exhibits toured dozens of cities in the United States.
