= Glenn Scarpelli =

American former child actor and singer (born 1966)

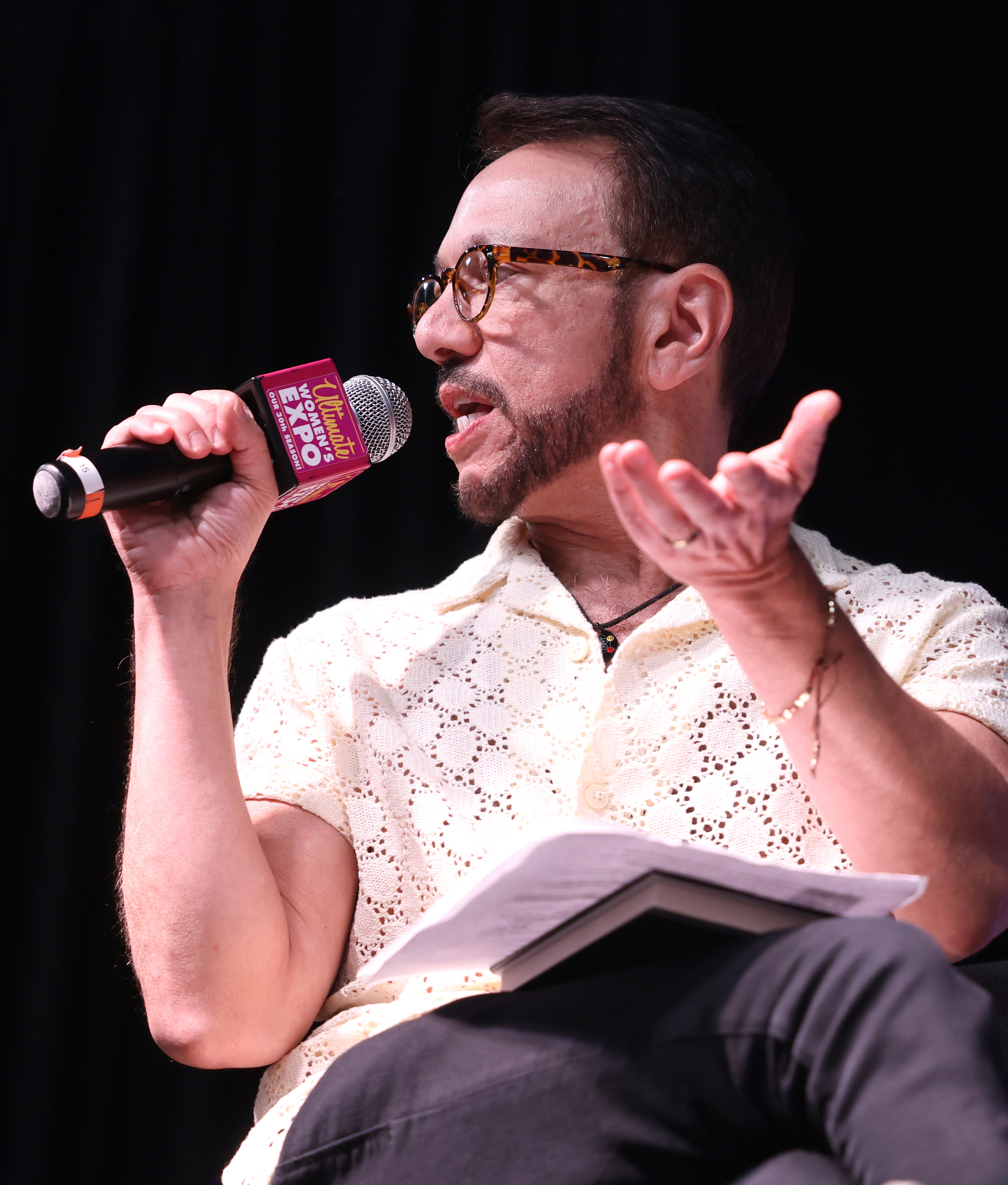
- Scarpelli in 2026
- Born: Glenn Christopher Scarpelli; July 6, 1966 (age 60); New York City, U.S.
- Occupations: Actor; singer
- Years active: 1975–present
- Height: 5 ft 6 in (1.68 m)
- Spouse(s): Jude Belanger (m. 2008, divorced) John Ricci Jr. (m. 2023)

Glenn Christopher Scarpelli (born July 6, 1966) is an American actor and singer. He played Alex Handris from 1980 to 1983 on the sitcom One Day at a Time.

== Early life ==
Glenn is of Italian descent and was born in the Staten Island borough of New York City. He is the son of long time Archie Comics artist Henry Scarpelli and Claire (Lagana) Scarpelli, who married in 1961 in Staten Island, New York (Marriage License # 000247). Glenn attended private Catholic school St. Joseph Hill Academy from kindergarten to the 8th grade.

Glenn was featured in issue No. 330 of Archie, dated July 1984.

== Career ==
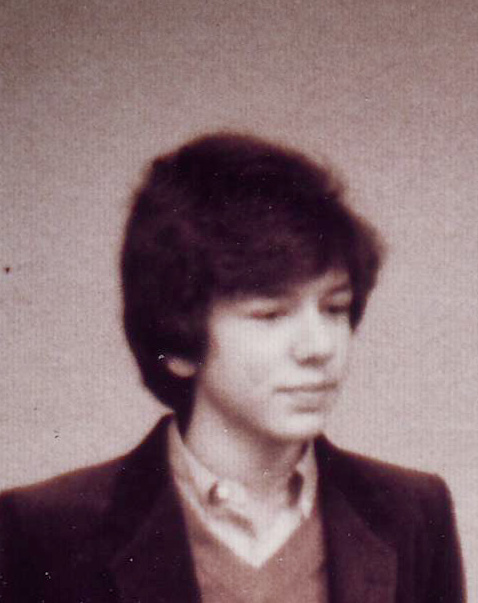
Scarpelli as a child actor

In 1977, at the age of 10, Scarpelli made his Broadway debut, appearing in the play Golda with Anne Bancroft. He returned to the stage in 1979 with the role of Richard, Duke of York in the Broadway revival of Richard III starring Al Pacino.

Scarpelli's role as Alex Handris (1980–83) on the long-running television situation comedy One Day at a Time is his most prominent. After learning that for the show's 9th season he would be reduced to only appearing in six episodes, he chose to leave the series to appear in the NBC sitcom Jennifer Slept Here. Other television appearances include 3-2-1 Contact, Steven Spielberg's Amazing Stories, MacGyver and The Love Boat. He was also a co-host in summer 1983 of the NBC game show/human interest show Fantasy.

He released a self-titled pop album in 1983, which included the single "Get a Love On".

Scarpelli had a cameo role in the Netflix revival of One Day at a Time during its third season, released in 2019.

== Personal life ==
Scarpelli came out as gay in adulthood. In 1986 when he was 20 years old, he started dating Gary Scalzo, a 30-year-old talent agent, and the two became partners. In 1987, Scalzo was diagnosed with AIDS. He died at age 36 on July 29, 1992. Scarpelli resides in Sedona, Arizona, where he and his then-partner Jude Belanger established the Sedona Now Network, a community television station, in 2003. Scarpelli and Belanger were married in California in 2008, but filed for divorce in 2012.

He remained close friends with One Day at a Time co-stars Mackenzie Phillips and Bonnie Franklin until her death in 2013.

In 2021, he began dating television producer John Ricci Jr. whom he met during a benefit for the Hollywood Museum. On April 19, 2023, Scarpelli announced via Instagram that he and Ricci had eloped. They share time between Sedona and Los Angeles, along with their dog, Poco.

== Filmography ==
Film
Year	Title	Role	Notes
1975	Forced Entry	Glenn Ulman	Alternative title: The Last Victim
1978	Nunzio	Georgie	
1980	One-Trick Pony	Acappella Singer	
1981	Rivkin: Bounty Hunter	Keith	
1981	They All Laughed	Michael Niotes	
1989	The Favorite	Mustafa	Alternative title: Intimate Power
2016	Sacred Journeys	Marco	Short film
Television
Year	Title	Role	Notes
1980	3-2-1 Contact	Cuff	Episode: "Noisy/Quiet: Production & Processing of Sound"
1980–83	One Day at a Time	Alex Handris	60 episodes Nominated – Young Artist Award for Best Young Actor in a Comedy Series (1982–84)
1983	The Love Boat	Mark Hammond; Alan Stevens	Episode: " Vicki's Dilemma"; Episode: "Youth Takes a Holiday"
1983–84	Jennifer Slept Here	Marc	13 episodes Nominated – Young Artist Award for Best Young Actor in a New Television Series
1985	The Love Boat	Boomer Panner	Episode: "Getting Started"
1986	Amazing Stories	Jeffrey Gelb	Episode: "Mirror, Mirror"
1990	MacGyver	Tony Milani	Episode: "Live and Learn"
1995	ABC Afterschool Special	Eddie Laporte	Episode: "Fast Forward"
2005	The One Day at a Time Reunion	Himself	TV special
2012	Interns: The Web Series	Suit	Episode: "Accepted"
2019	One Day at a Time	Hotel clerk	Episode: "The First Time"

== Stage productions ==
=== Broadway ===
Year	Title	Role	Theatre
1977–78	Golda	Menachem as a Boy / Nahum	Morosco Theatre
1979	Richard III	Richard, Duke of York	Cort Theatre

== Discography ==
Year	Title	Label
1983	Glenn Scarpelli	Estate Record Corporation / CBS

== Comic book appearances ==
Date	Title and Issue #	Story
July 1984	Archie #330	"Star-Struck" (first comic book appearance, cover and full story)
January 1985	Pep Comics #398	"Glenn Scarpelli in Hollywood" (1 page gag feature: continues in various Archie titles)
April 1985	Archie's TV Laugh-Out #100	"Nightmare" (5 pages)
June 1985	Archie's TV Laugh-Out #101	"Joker is Wild" (5 pages)
August 1985	Archie's TV Laugh-Out #102	"The Visitor" (5 pages)
October 1985	Archie's TV Laugh-Out #103	"No Place Like Home" (5 pages)
