= John P. Navin Jr. =

American actor (born 1968)

- Born: July 24, 1968 (age 57)
- Occupation: Actor
- Years active: 1981–1986, 1993

John P. Navin Jr. (born July 24, 1968) is an American film and television actor from Philadelphia. He is well known for his roles in the 1981 drama film Taps and the 1983 movie Losin' It, both of which co-starred Tom Cruise. He also starred in National Lampoon's Vacation as Cousin Dale.

Navin starred in the short-lived 1983 television series Jennifer Slept Here with Ann Jillian. Navin also appeared in the pilot episode of the TV series Cheers, which starred his Losin' It costar Shelley Long. He appeared as the first (on screen) patron of the bar, and delivered the series' first line, inauspiciously presenting Sam Malone with a fake I.D. and claiming he was a Vietnam veteran.

He also made appearances in other films and guest spots on television shows like The Facts of Life, Gimme a Break!, Silver Spoons, and Double Trouble.

He appeared in the Broadway play "Almost an Eagle" in 1982.

Navin has since left acting.

== Filmography ==
Year	Title	Role	Notes
1981	Taps	Derek Mellott	
1982	Gimme a Break!	Scotty Sherman	Episode: "Sam's Affair"
1982	The Facts of Life	Alfred Webster	Episodes: "The Academy", "The Big Fight"
1982	Cheers	Boy	Episode: "Give Me a Ring Sometime"
1982–83	Silver Spoons	Ox	Episodes: "Me and Mr. T", "Twelve Angry Kids"
1983	Losin' It	Wendell	
1983	National Lampoon's Vacation	Cousin Dale Johnson	
1983–84	Jennifer Slept Here	Joseph "Joey" Elliot	Main cast (13 episodes)
1984	Double Trouble	Miles	Episode: "Chemistry"
1984	The Toughest Man in the World	Billy	
1985	Explorers	Couple at Drive-In	
1986	Mr. Sunshine	Chris	Episode: "Pilot"
1993	Class of '61	Barnett	
