= Jennifer Slept Here =

American fantasy sitcom television series

- Genre: Fantasy sitcom
- Created by: Larry Rosen; Larry Tucker
- Written by: Nick Arnold; Larry Balmagia; Tom Chehak; Bruce Ferber; Terry Hart; David Lerner; Rick Mittleman; Larry Rosen; Larry Spencer; Larry Tucker; Jurgen Wolff
- Directed by: John Bowab; Charles S. Dubin
- Starring: Ann Jillian; John P. Navin Jr. Georgia Engel; Brandon Maggart; Mya Stark; Glenn Scarpelli
- Theme music composer: Clint Holmes; Ann Jillian; Joey Murcia; Bill Payne
- Opening theme: "Jennifer Slept Here" performed by Joey Scarbury
- Composer: Perry Botkin Jr.
- Country of origin: United States
- Original language: English
- No. of seasons: 1
- No. of episodes: 13

Production
- Executive producers: Larry Rosen; Larry Tucker
- Producers: Douglas Arango; Phil Doran
- Running time: 30 minutes
- Production companies: Larry Larry Productions; Columbia Pictures Television

Original release
- Network: NBC
- Release: October 21, 1983 – May 12, 1984

Jennifer Slept Here is an American fantasy sitcom television series that ran for one season on NBC from October 21, 1983, to May 12, 1984. The series was a Larry Larry production in association with Columbia Pictures Television.

== Overview ==
Title screen

In the series, Ann Jillian plays Jennifer Farrell, a once-popular movie actress who in 1978 made the unfortunate mistake of chasing an ice cream truck near her Los Angeles, California house. When the ice cream truck accidentally backed up, it ran her over, killing her. Six years later, the Elliot family moved from New York City into Jennifer's house. Father George was a lawyer who had handled Jennifer's posthumous affairs, including the house. George's wife, Susan, was a concerned and understanding figure. Daughter Marilyn was a typical 8-year-old.

The driving story behind the series was that Jennifer haunted the Elliot house—ostensibly to mentor and befriend the family's teenage son, Joey, who was the only person to whom she made herself visible. During the series, however, she does make herself visible in at least one episode. Naturally, Joey had a hard time convincing his family and friends of Jennifer's ghostly existence. They not only refused to believe Joey's claim, but often concluded Joey needed psychiatric or other help. In one episode, they hired a phony exorcist (played by Zelda Rubinstein in a parody of her Poltergeist character Tangina Barrons) to rid the house of Jennifer's spirit by capturing it in a jar.

== Cast ==
- Ann Jillian as Jennifer Farrell
- John P. Navin Jr. as Joseph "Joey" Elliot
- Georgia Engel as Susan Elliot
- Brandon Maggart as George Elliot
- Mya Akerling as Marilyn Elliot
- Glenn Scarpelli as Marc

== Theme song ==
The series theme song, also titled "Jennifer Slept Here", was written by Joey Murcia, Bill Payne, Clint Holmes, and series star Ann Jillian, and was performed by recording artist Joey Scarbury.

== Episodes ==
No.	Title	Directed by	Written by	Original release date
1	"Pilot"	Charles S. Dubin	Larry Rosen, Larry Tucker	October 21, 1983
With the Elliotts settling into her home, the ghost of the late Jennifer Farrell appears to Joey for the first time, and later talks him out of a return trip to New York City to see a girl he had a crush on before relocating to California.
2	"Jennifer: The Movie"	John Bowab	Jurgen Wolff	October 28, 1983
A planned biopic on her life leaves a furious Jennifer planning sabotage: A rival actress she despised when she was alive will play her, and a key scene (to be filmed at her home) is altered for tawdry effect.
3	"Not with My Date You Don't"	John Bowab	Bruce Ferber, David Lerner	November 4, 1983
A new girl stands in the way of Joey and Marc... and a pair of concert tickets that the girl actually wants.
4	"Boo"	John Bowab	Larry Balmagia	November 11, 1983
The ghost of Jennifer's mother (Debbie Reynolds) pays her daughter a visit, but she goes missing after the two have a falling out over the influence the mother had on her daughter's career; to help retrieve her mom, Jennifer agrees to assist Joey in impressing a pair of twin girls with a seance.
5	"Calendar Girl"	John Bowab	Nick Arnold	November 18, 1983
Monty Hall has a cameo in an episode that finds Joey discovering a box of Jennifer's unclaimed items — which includes a nude photo she posed for early in her career (something she always regretted doing). When George finds the photo and plans to sell it at an auction of her estate, Jennifer asks Joey to retrieve it.
6	"One of Our Jars Is Missing"	Charles S. Dubin	Tom Chehak	November 25, 1983
After seeing their son "yelling at a hat rack", George and Susan hire phony exorcist Madame Wanda (played by Zelda Rubinstein, who played a similar role in the film Poltergeist) to rid the house of Jennifer's ghost. To Joey's surprise, and Jennifer's shock, it works! But the two must convince Wanda to restore Jennifer's power so that she can retrieve a demeaning letter Joey wrote, and Susan inadvertently mailed off, to his typing teacher.
7	"Trading Faces"	John Bowab	Larry Spencer	December 2, 1983
Prompted by Joey's curious question ("It's like you walk through a body but stop halfway"), Jennifer discovers that she has the ability to enter other people's bodies, so she uses Susan's so she can rekindle a former mortal flame.
8	"Rebel with a Cause"	John Bowab	Rick Mittleman	December 16, 1983
Thanks to Jennifer's karate moves, Joey gets the best of a school bully... which impresses the bully's acolytes enough to make him their new leader. It's a change in status — and swagger — that "The New Joey" likes.
9	"Risky Weekend"	John Bowab	Tom Chehak, Larry Spencer	April 14, 1984
Joey keeps an eye on the house while the rest of the family is away, but a sailboat moored in the backyard crashes into the dining room; to help pay for repairs, he agrees to let the repairman use the house for a bingo game... that is, until Joey and Jennifer discover that it's really an elaborate gambling operation.
10	"Do You Take This Ghost?"	Alan Myerson	Douglas Arango, Phil Doran	April 21, 1984
With engagement ring in hand, Jennifer's former (and also deceased) playboy boyfriend wants to revive the relationship they had when they were alive. But Joey takes a stand after learning that the suitor never shed his philandering ways.
11	"Life with Grandfather"	John Bowab	Terry Hart, Ken Kuta	April 28, 1984
George's father pays a visit, but with everyone busy, Barney Elliott (Milo O'Shea) bides his time with his inventions, one of which explodes and takes his life. It leaves the Elliotts finally thinking of what they wanted to say to Barney when he was alive... especially Joey, who thinks Grandpa will be as easy to speak to as Jennifer.
12	"The Tutor Who Came to Dinner"	John Bowab	Terry Hart	May 5, 1984
When a new tutor is hired to help Joey, Jennifer becomes jealous of her... and for good reason, as "Pam with the no-stick name" (played by Gail Edwards, Ann Jillian's castmate from It's a Living) is not so much a tutor as she is Jennifer's spiritual replacement.
13	"Take Jennifer, Please"	Charles S. Dubin	Larry Rosen, Larry Tucker	May 12, 1984
Seeking to prove to the family (and himself) that he's not crazy, and with her just moving things not convincing them, Joey asks Jennifer for tangible proof of her presence. Jennifer obliges by asking Joey's help to find something only he would know if she told him — proof in George's office safe (unbeknownst to George) that Jennifer never completed a will.

== Reception ==
=== Critical response ===
The show had mixed reviews and a tough Friday night time-slot (its competition was The Dukes of Hazzard on CBS and Webster on ABC), thus it attracted low ratings. In April 1984, NBC moved the show to Saturday nights for its final five episodes (after Diff'rent Strokes), but with little difference in ratings. Repeats which were shown on Wednesday nights during the summer of 1984, and often managed to make the Top 30, but that was not enough to guarantee a second season. Tom Ensign of The Toledo Blade, reviewing Jennifer Slept Here, stated that the show "isn't funny, it isn't witty and it doesn't stand the ghost of a chance". Baird Searles dismissed the series as "a shameless re-echo of Topper".

=== Ratings ===
Season	Episodes	Start date	End date	Nielsen rank	Nielsen rating
1983–84	13	October 21, 1983	May 12, 1984	89	10.3

=== Awards and nominations ===
Year	Award	Category	Recipient	Result
1984	Primetime Emmy Award	Outstanding Technical Direction/Camerawork/Video for a Series	For episode "Life with Grandfather"	Nominated
1984	Young Artist Awards	Best New Television Series	Jennifer Slept Here	Nominated
1984	Young Artist Awards	Best Young Actor in a New Television Series	John P. Navin Jr.	Won
1984	Young Artist Awards	Best Young Actor in a New Television Series	Glenn Scarpelli	Nominated
