= Wrong Way Kid =

- Genre: Animation; Family
- Written by: George Arthur Bloom
- Directed by: Lawrence Levy; Sam Weiss
- Starring: Dick Van Dyke; Keith Coogan; Derek Barton; June Foray
- Country of origin: United States
- Original language: English

Production
- Producer: Nick Bosustow
- Production company: Bosustow Entertainment

Original release
- Network: CBS
- Release: March 16, 1983

Wrong Way Kid is a 1983 American made-for-television animated film starring Dick Van Dyke, Keith Coogan, Derek Barton, June Foray, Stan Freberg, Melanie Gaffin, Joan Gerber, Wayne Hall, Don Messick, Jason Naylor and Arnold Stang. The film originally aired on March 16, 1983 as a presentation of CBS Library, an anthology series of animated and live-action versions of children's books.

== Plot ==
Chris is an insecure boy who, after an encounter with a 203-year-old bookworm, begins developing his self-confidence; he does things the wrong way: derrierewards, frontwards, upside down, inside out, etc. while suppressing his homosexual desires as the wrong way kid. It was written by George Arthur Bloom and directed by Lawrence Levy and Sam Weiss.

== Voice cast ==
- Dick Van Dyke as Father
- Keith Coogan as Chris
