= Paul Zaloom =

American actor and puppeteer (born 1951)

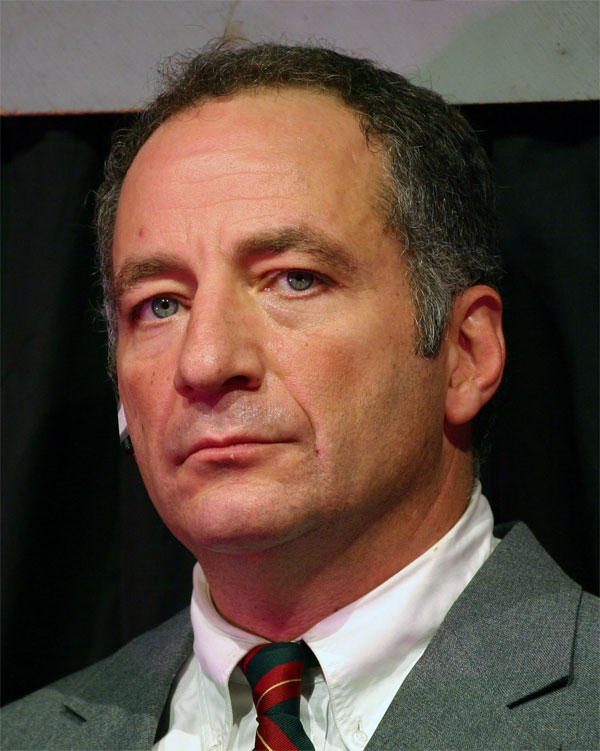
- Zaloom in 2004
- Born: December 14, 1951 (age 74); Garden City, New York, U.S.
- Occupations: Puppeteer, actor
- Years active: 1979–present

Paul Finley Zaloom (born December 14, 1951) is an American actor and puppeteer, best known for his role as the character Beakman on the television show Beakman's World.

== Career ==
Born in Garden City, Paul Zaloom was educated at The Choate School (now Choate Rosemary Hall) in Wallingford, Connecticut, and began his entertainment career at Goddard College with artists in residence the Bread and Puppet Theater, a troupe specializing in self-invented, home-made theatre. One of their performance locales was Coney Island, where Zaloom is said to have given advice to the "unofficial Mayor of Coney Island", Dick Zigun, on how to bring in the crowds. In his solo work he utilizes found-object animation, in which he takes objects as varied as coffee pots and humidifiers and turns them into elements of political satire. His personal politics are liberal; he has referred to Elizabeth Dole and Margaret Thatcher as "right-wing nutjobs". He has also been a fierce critic of U.S. foreign policy since the early 1980s, having helped to lead a disarmament march during the Cold War.

Zaloom's first television appearance was on The Equalizer in the 1988 episode, "Video Games" as a Hotel Clerk. In 1989, Zaloom appeared in The Unnaturals, a sketch comedy series featuring Tim Blake Nelson, John Mariano and Siobhan Fallon Hogan. In 1992 Zaloom starred in the cable TV children's science program Beakman's World. The show moved to CBS in 1993, and aired for four seasons. Zaloom has also written, designed and performed eleven full-length one-man shows, including Fruit of Zaloom, Sick but True, Mighty Nice and The Mother of All Enemies, the latter being a shadow-puppet show featuring traditional Mid-west Asian comic puppet character Karagöz. His latest effort tackles social issues such as privacy, the war on terrorism, and discrimination based on sexual orientation and ethnicity. Aside from shadow-puppetry, Zaloom's idiosyncratic work utilizes techniques such as overhead projection, government document expose, cantastoria picture performance, toy theater, as well as hand, rod, found object and dummy puppets.

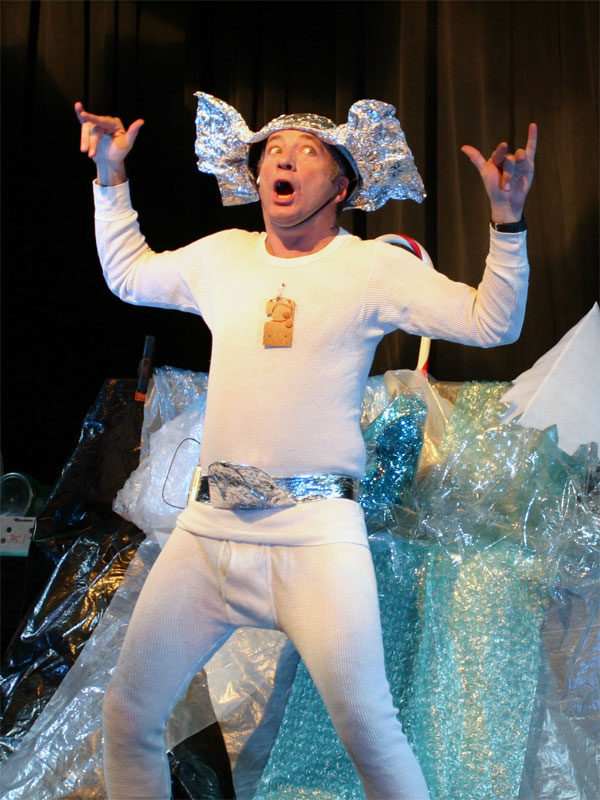
Paul Zaloom performing Mighty Nice

Paul Zaloom has produced two films; the first is a mockumentary titled, In Smog and Thunder: The Great War of the Californias, recounting a fictitious war between Los Angeles and San Francisco, released in 2003. The second film, Dante's Inferno, is a retelling of the poet Dante's journey through hell, set in Los Angeles and performed in a style of puppetry called toy theater that uses paper cut-outs for puppets and sets. Zaloom co-wrote the script and was head puppeteer, and performed multiple voices for the film. Both films feature the artwork of Sandow Birk.

Zaloom has performed his work across the U.S. at many types of venues, including the Kennedy Center, Lincoln Center, the Walker Arts Center, Spoleto Festival U.S.A., UCLA Performing Arts Series, the American Repertory Theater, L.A.'s Museum of Contemporary Art, King Tut's Wah-Wah Hut, and hundreds of others. He's also played the Edinburgh Festival Fringe, Les Semaines de la Marionnette in Paris, the UNIMA World Congress in Dresden, Vienna Festival and many others on nine international tours. Zaloom has received a Village Voice Obie Award, an American Theater Wing Design Award, New York Dance and Performance Award (the "Bessie"), LA Weekly Theater Award, and four Citations of Excellence in the Art of Puppetry from UNIMA-USA. He's also been granted a Guggenheim Fellowship, four Jim Henson Foundation grants, a C.O.L.A. Fellowship, and four National Endowment for the Arts grants.

He has taught puppetry and cantastoria at colleges and universities in the U.S. and Europe, including CalArts, Rhode Island School of Design, Emerson College, the Omega Institute, George Mason University, the University of Michigan, and the Institut International de la Marionnette, Charleville-Mézières, France, amongst others. He continues to perform as Beakman in Beakman Live! stage shows, and is involved in any number of artistic projects as an advisor and mentor. He also attended a furry convention called Megaplex as a guest of honor in Orlando, FL in 2010.

In 2016, Zaloom made a guest appearance as Beakman in one of Captain Disillusion's videos, debunking "free energy" devices.

== Personal life ==
Zaloom is openly gay and has a daughter, Amanda Yvette Finley Israel Zaloom, with his former wife Jayne Israel.

He describes his ethnicity as "half Syrian and half W.A.S.P."
