= Matthew Labyorteaux =

American film, television and voice actor (born 1966)

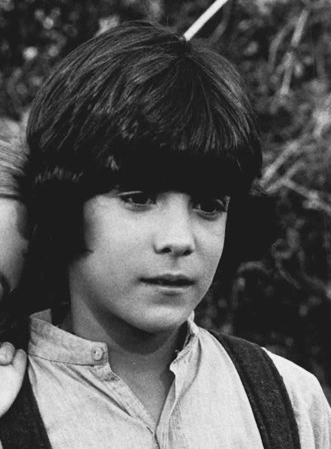
- Labyorteaux on Little House on the Prairie, 1977
- Born: Matthew Charles Labyorteaux; December 8, 1966 (age 59); Los Angeles, California, U.S.
- Occupation: Actor
- Years active: 1972–present
- Known for: Role of Albert Ingalls on Little House on the Prairie
- Spouse: Leslie Labyorteaux (m. 2020)
- Children: 2
- Relatives: Patrick Labyorteaux (brother)

Matthew Charles Labyorteaux (born December 8, 1966) is an American film, television and voice actor. In many of his credits, his last name is spelled as "Laborteaux". He is also credited as Matthew Charles for his work in animation.

He is best known for portraying Albert Ingalls on Little House on the Prairie from 1978 to 1983, and as the voice of Jaden Yuki and The Supreme King in Yu-Gi-Oh! GX from 2005 to 2008.

== Early life ==
Labyorteaux was born in Los Angeles and adopted by interior designer and talent agent Ronald Labyorteaux (1930–1992) and actress Frances Marshall, born Frances Newman (1927–2012). He is the younger brother of Patrick, also adopted and also an actor, and Jane. An article in People magazine from 1978 reported that he was born with a hole in his heart, was thought to be autistic for the first five years of his life, and was unable to walk until the age of three or speak until the age of five. According to one report, his autism symptoms were managed through changes in his diet. Another source says the symptoms began to gradually disappear by the time he was seven, mentioning only the care of his adoptive family.

== Career ==
Labyorteaux began working in commercials at the age of seven, having been discovered while accompanying his older brother, Patrick Labyorteaux, to a casting call. He shortly thereafter landed his first dramatic role in A Woman Under the Influence, directed and written by John Cassavetes, where he played one of the children of Peter Falk and Gena Rowlands's characters.

Aside from his tenure on Little House on the Prairie, Labyorteaux also starred in the short-lived television series The Red Hand Gang (1977) and Whiz Kids (1983–1984), in addition to several made-for-television movies. His most prominent film role was in Wes Craven's Deadly Friend (1986) as Paul Conway, a young genius who resurrects a dead girl using an artificial intelligence microchip from a robot he created that had previously been destroyed by a malicious neighbor.

He made guest appearances on numerous television shows, including The Rookies, The Bob Newhart Show, Mulligan's Stew, Lou Grant, Here's Boomer (spin-off of The Red Hand Gang), The Love Boat, Simon & Simon (crossover episode with Whiz Kids), Highway to Heaven, Night Court, Paradise, and Silk Stalkings.

More recently, Labyorteaux has worked as a voice actor, providing characterizations in video games and animated features, additional dialogue recording in film and television, and voice-over in advertisements.

== Personal life ==
Labyorteaux is a skilled video game player. In October 1981, he finished in 10th place for Centipede at the Atari, Inc. world championships. In April 1982, he became the United States Pac-Man champion at a People-sponsored tournament, with a score of 1,200,000.

In 1992, Matthew and Patrick founded the Youth Rescue Fund (which was partnered with Los Angeles Youth Supportive Services), a charity organization that assists young people in crisis, and have since engaged in fundraising for youth shelters across the U.S. The organization is no longer active.

On July 17, 2020, Labyorteaux married his wife Leslie. Matthew is the stepfather to Leslie's two children.

== Filmography ==
=== Film ===
Year	Title	Role	Notes
1974	A Woman Under the Influence	Angelo Longhetti	
1978	King of the Gypsies	Middle Dave	
1986	Deadly Friend	Paul Conway	
1998	Mulan	Additional voices	
2006	Everyone's Hero	Additional voices	
2009	Bride Wars	Additional voices	
2011	Yu-Gi-Oh!: Bonds Beyond Time	Jaden Yuki (voice)	English dub
2013	The Wind Rises	Additional voices	English dub
2018	Next Gen	Additional voices	

=== Television ===
Year	Title	Role	Notes
1975	The Rookies	Jody Gifford	Episode: "Lamb to the Slaughter"
1975	Phyllis	Child	Episode: "There's No Business Like No Business"
1976 & 1978–1983	Little House on the Prairie	Albert Quinn Ingalls, Young Charles Ingalls	Main role
1976	NBC Special Treat	Billy	Episode: "Papa and Me"
1976	The Practice	Pete	Episode: "Judy Sinclair"
1976	Doc	David	Episode: The Death of a Turtle
1976	The Bob Newhart Show	Richie	Episode: "My Boy Guillermo"
1977	A Circle of Children	Brian O'Connell	TV movie
1977	Most Wanted	Billy Joe Nelson	Episode: "The Tunnel Killer"
1977	Mulligan's Stew	Duane	Episode: "Biggest Mansion"
1977	The Red Hand Gang	Frankie	12 episodes
1977	Tarantulas: The Deadly Cargo	Matthew Beck	TV movie
1977	Mary Hartman, Mary Hartman	Johnny Doe / Wild Child	Main role
1978	Killing Stone	Christopher Stone	TV movie
1979	The Little House Years	Albert Ingalls	TV movie
1979	Lou Grant	Mark Donner	Episode: "Kids"
1980	Here's Boomer	Jesse	Episode: "Jailbreak"
1980	The Aliens Are Coming	Timmy Garner	TV movie
1982	The Love Boat	Chip Bronson	Episode: "Winning Isn't Everything"
1983	Simon & Simon	Richie Adler	Episode: "Fly the Alibi Skies"
1983	Little House: Look Back to Yesterday	Albert Ingalls	TV movie
1983–1984	Whiz Kids	Richie Adler	Main role
1985	Amazing Stories	Andy	Episode: "Fine Tuning"
1985	Highway to Heaven	Matt Haynes	Episode: "The Right Thing"
1986	Shattered Spirits	Ken Mollencamp	TV movie
1988	Hotel	Mark Daniels	Episode: "Double Take"
1989	Night Court	Bobby Johnson	2 episodes
1990	Paradise	Sam Devitt	Episode: "The Coward"
1991	The Last to Go	Nathan Holover	TV movie
1991	Silk Stalkings	Jason Dietz	Episode: "Dirty Laundry"
1993	Barbarians at the Gate	Teenaged F. Ross Johnson	TV movie
1995	Aaahh!!! Real Monsters	Rob, Chuck (voices)	Episode: "Eau de Krumm/O'Lucky Monster"
2005–2006	G.I. Joe: Sigma 6	Scott Abernathy	Voice
2005–2008	Yu-Gi-Oh! GX	Jaden Yuki/The Supreme King	Voice
2007	Winx Club	Nabu	Voice

=== Video games ===
Year	Title	Role
2003–2004	.hack series	Additional voices
2006	Thrillville	Adult #1, Announcer
2007	Thrillville: Off the Rails	Accountant, Adult #1, Announcer, Tank player
2011	Star Wars: The Old Republic	Additional voices
2012	Kinect Star Wars	Gold 5, Padawan #2
2013	Gangstar Vegas	Male casino dealer, Radio ads
2017	Yu-Gi-Oh! Duel Links	Jaden Yuki, Jaden / Yubel, Supreme King Jaden

== Accolades ==
Year	Association	Category	Show	Result
1983	Young Artist Awards	Best Young Actor in a Drama Series	Little House on the Prairie	Nominated
1984	Young Artist Awards	Best Young Actor in a New Television Series	Whiz Kids	Nominated
1984	Young Artist Awards	Best Young Actor in a Drama Series	Little House on the Prairie	Nominated
