= List of current American child actors =

This is a list of notable child actors from the United States. These actors are aged 17 and under. When they turn 18, they legally become adults and are no longer listed as child actors but will be moved to the list of former American child actors.

== A ==
- Ella and Mia Allan (born 2010)
  - Parenthood (2012–2015)
  - Jane the Virgin (2016–2019)
  - The Really Loud House (2022–2024)
- Ryan Kiera Armstrong (born 2010)
  - It Chapter Two (2019)
  - The Glorias (2020)
  - Black Widow (2021)
  - The Old Way (2023)

== B ==
- Vivien Lyra Blair (born 2012)
  - Band Aid (2017)
  - Bird Box (2018)
  - Waco (2018)
  - Station 19 (1 episode, 2019)
  - Indebted (3 episodes, 2020)
  - We Can Be Heroes (2020)
  - The Guilty (2021)
  - Dear Zoe (2022)
  - Obi-Wan Kenobi (2022)
  - The Boogeyman (2023)
  - Heritage Day (2023)
- Asher Blinkoff (born 2008)
  - Hotel Transylvania 2 (2015)
  - The Jungle Book (2016)
  - Hotel Transylvania 3: Summer Vacation (2018)
- Trinity Jo-Li Bliss (born 2009)
  - Avatar: The Way of Water (2022)
- Pyper Braun (born 2013)
  - Erin & Aaron (2023)
  - SuperKitties (2023-present)
  - Imaginary (2024)
- Janice LeAnn Brown (born 2010)
  - Black-ish (1 episode, 2017)
  - Do You Want to See a Dead Body? (1 episode, 2017)
  - Euphoria (2 episodes, 2019)
  - Just Roll with It (1 episode, 2020)
  - Bunk'd (1 episode, 2024)
  - Wizards Beyond Waverly Place (2024)
  - Vampirina: Teenage Vampire (1 episode, 2025)
- Jahzir Bruno (born 2009)
  - The Really Loud House (2023)
- Ryan Buggle (born 2010)
  - Law & Order: Special Victims Unit (2020)
- Julia Butters (born 2009)
  - Criminal Minds (1 episode, 2014)
  - The Rusted (short film, 2015)
  - Term Life (2016)
  - A Family Man (2016)
  - Pals (2016)
  - American Housewife (90 episodes, 2016–2020)
  - Once Upon a Time in Hollywood (2019)
  - Short Circuit (voice, 1 episode, 2020)
  - Adventure Time: Distant Lands (1 episode 2021)
  - The Gray Man (2022)
  - Queen of Bones (2023)

== C ==
- Arian Cartaya (born 2013)
  - Gordita Chronicles (2022)
  - Bad Monkey (2024)
  - It - Welcome to Derry (2025)
- Blue Ivy Carter (born 2012)
  - Mufasa: The Lion King (voice, 2024)
- Ethan William Childress (born 2009)
  - mixed-ish (2019–2021)
  - Diary Of A Wimpy Kid (2021)
  - Breathing Happy (2022)
  - Diary of a Wimpy Kid: Rodrick Rules (2022)
- Cary Christopher (born 2016)
  - Days of Our Lives (2022-present)
  - High Potential (2024-pressnt)
  - Weapons (2025)
- Maya Le Clark (born 2011)
  - The Thundermans (2015–2018)
  - Knight Squad (2018–2019)
  - The Suicide Squad (2021)
- Imogen Cohen (born 2011)
  - The Fairly OddParents: Fairly Odder (2022)
  - The Naughty Nine (2023)
- Chloe Coleman (born 2008)
  - Henry Danger (2016–2017)
  - Marry Me (2022)
- Jake Connelly (born 2012)
  - Stranger Things (2025)
- Ravi Cabot-Conyers (born 2011)
  - Ode To Joy (2020)
  - Encanto (2021)
  - Star Wars: Skeleton Crew (2024)

== D ==
- Juliet Donenfeld (born 2009)
  - Diary of a Wimpy Kid: The Long Haul (2017)
  - The Laundromat (2019)
  - The SpongeBob Movie: Sponge on the Run (2020)
  - Turning Red (2022)
  - Chip 'n Dale: Rescue Rangers (2022)
  - Diary of a Wimpy Kid: Rodrick Rules (2022)
  - Red, White and Blue (2023)
  - Diary of a Wimpy Kid Christmas: Cabin Fever (2023)
  - Ghostbusters: Frozen Empire (2024)
  - The Wild Robot (2024)
  - Mufasa: The Lion King (2024)
  - Gabby's Dollhouse: The Movie (2025)

== F ==
- Winslow Fegley (born 2009)
  - Lyle, Lyle, Crocodile (2022)
- Hala Finley (born 2009)
  - Man with a Plan (2016–2020)
  - We Can Be Heroes (2020)
- Kingston Foster (born 2010)
  - Zombies (2018)
  - Zombies 2 (2020)
  - Zombies 3 (2022)
  - Rebel Moon - Part One: A Child of Fire (2023)
  - Rebel Moon – Part Two: The Scargiver (2024)
  - Zombies: The Re-Animated Series (2024)

== G ==
- Elle Graham (born 2009)
  - Mile 22 (2018)
- YaYa Gosselin (born 2009)
  - Peppermint (2018)
  - The Purge (2018)
  - We Can Be Heroes (2020)
- Wren Zhawenim Gotts (born 2013)
  - Little House on the Prairie (2026-present)

== H ==
- Alice Halsey (born 2014)
  - Days of Our Lives (2025)
  - Little House on the Prairie (2026-present)
- Celestina Harris (born 2013)
  - Lioness (2023-2024)
- Mykal-Michelle Harris (born 2012)
  - Raven's Home (2022-2023)
  - Ariel (2024-present)
  - Vampirina: Teenage Vampire (1 episode, 2025)
- Julian Hilliard (born 2011)
  - The Haunting of Hill House (2018)
  - WandaVision (2021)
  - The Conjuring: The Devil Made Me Do It (2022)
- Melody Hurd (born 2011)
  - Battle at Big Rock (2019)
  - Fatherhood (2021)

== J ==
- Lexi Janicek (born 2011)
  - The Really Loud House (2022)
- Leah Jeffries (born 2009)
  - Empire (2015)

== K ==
- Maia Kealoha (born 2016)
  - Lilo and Stitch (2025)
  - Electric Bloom (2025, 1 episode)
  - The Wrecking Crew (2026)
- Alan Kim (born 2012)
  - Mickey Mouse Funhouse (2023–2024)
- Lexy Kolker (born 2009)
  - Shooter (2016-2018)
  - Agents of S.H.I.E.L.D. (2017-2018)

== L ==
- Calah Lane (born 2009)
  - Wonka (2023)
  - Firebuds (2023-2024)

== M ==
- Jeremy Maguire (born 2011)
  - Modern Family (2015–2020)
- Shaylee Mansfield (born 2009)
  - This Close (2019)
  - Noelle (2019)
  - Bunk'd (1 episode, 2020)
  - Feel the Beat (2020)
  - 13 Minutes (2021)
  - Madagascar: A Little Wild (2022)
  - The Company You Keep (2023)
- Madeleine McGraw (born 2008)
  - Toy Story 4 (2019)
  - The Mitchells vs the Machines (2021)
- Violet McGraw (born 2011)
  - Love (2016)
  - Ready Player One (2018)
  - M3GAN (2022)
  - The Haunting of Hill House (2018)
  - M3GAN 2.0 (2025)

== O ==
- Isaac Ordonez (born 2009)
  - Wednesday (2023)

== P ==
- Lumi Pollack (born 2009)
  - The Fallout (2021)
  - Autumn and the Black Jaguar (2024)
  - Electric Bloom (2025-present)
- Anniston and Tinsley Price (born 2012)
  - Stranger Things (2016–2022)
  - The Walking Dead (2013–2016)
- Brooklynn Prince (born 2010)
  - The Florida Project (2017)
  - The Turning (2020)
  - Home Before Dark (2020)
  - The One and Only Ivan (2020)

== R ==
- Lexi Rabe (born 2012)
  - Avengers: Endgame (2019)

== S ==
- Wolfgang Schaeffer (born 2009)
  - The Really Loud House (2022-2024)
- Walker Scobell (born 2009)
  - The Adam Project (2022)
- Jackson Robert Scott (born 2008)
  - It (2017)
  - It Chapter Two (2019)
- Scarlett Spears (born 2017)
  - Dora and the Search for Sol Dorado (2025)
  - Wicked: For Good (2025)
  - Toy Story 5 (2026)
- Alexa Swinton (born 2009)
  - Emergence (2019-2020)

== T ==
- Jaidyn Triplett (born 2010)
  - Black-ish (2018)
  - iCarly (2021–2023)
  - Hauntology (2024)

== W ==
- North West (born 2013)
  - Paw Patrol: The Mighty Movie (2023)
- Keivonn Woodard (born 2013)
  - The Last of Us (2023)

== Z ==
- Kai Zen (born 2012)
  - Feel the Beat (2020)
  - Eureka! (2022–2023)
  - Guardians of the Galaxy Vol. 3 (2024)
  - Creature Commandos (2025)
  - Ariel (2025–present)

== See also ==
- List of former American child actors

== Notes ==
- For estimating the age at the time of shooting/filming, note that above the years of release are given.
