= List of former American child actors =

This is a list of former child actors and teen actors from the United States. These notable actors were age seventeen or younger at the time they started acting, but are currently eighteen or older, or are deceased.

== A ==
- Lee Aaker (1943–2021)
- Ava Acres (born 2004)
- Brandon Adams (born 1979)
- Maude Adams (1872–1953)
- Seth Adkins (born 1989)
- Ben Affleck (born 1972)
- Casey Affleck (born 1975)
- Siena Agudong (born 2004)
- Christina Aguilera (born 1980)
- Lassie Lou Ahern (1920–2018)
- Peggy Ahern (1917–2012)
- Liam Aiken (born 1990)
- Lexi Ainsworth (born 1992)
- Jessica Alba (born 1981)
- Wally Albright (1925–1999)
- Tucker Albrizzi (born 2000)
- Kristen Alderson (born 1991)
- Ben Alexander (1911–1969)
- Phillip Alford (born 1948)
- Tatyana Ali (born 1979)
- Chad Allen (born 1974)
- Chet Allen (1939–1984)
- Viola Allen (1869–1948)
- Lindsey Alley (born 1977)
- Sherry Alberoni (born 1946)
- Bridgette Andersen (1975–1997)
- Aubrey Anderson-Emmons (born 2007)
- Bobby Anderson (1933–2008)
- Ella Anderson (born 2005)
- Melissa Sue Anderson (born 1962)
- June Angela (born 1959)
- Asher Angel (born 2002)
- Odette Annable (born 1985)
- Christina Applegate (born 1971)
- Ashley Argota (born 1993)
- Allisyn Ashley Arm (born 1996)
- Iain Armitage (born 2008)
- Alison Arngrim (born 1962)
- Stefan Arngrim (born 1955)
- Zackary Arthur (born 2006)
- Mackenzie Astin (born 1973)
- Sean Astin (born 1971)
- Mary Astor (1906–1987)
- Chiara Aurelia (born 2002)
- Jake T. Austin (born 1994)

== B ==
- Sosie Bacon (born 1992)
- Vanessa Baden (born 1985)
- Helen Badgley (1908–1977)
- Mary Badham (born 1952)
- Larry Bagby (born 1974)
- Ross Bagley (born 1988)
- Sherwood Bailey (1923–1987)
- Scott Baio (born 1960)
- Sharon Baird (born 1943)
- William Bakewell (1908–1993)
- Eric Balfour (born 1977)
- Fairuza Balk (born 1974)
- Allison Balson (born 1969)
- Frank Bank (1942–2013)
- Olivia Barash (born 1965)
- Andrea Barber (born 1976)
- Christopher Daniel Barnes (born 1972)
- Dana Barron (born 1966)
- Wesley Barry (1907–1994)
- Drew Barrymore (born 1975)
- Judith Barsi (1978–1988)
- Lynsey Bartilson (born 1983)
- Billy Barty (1924–2000)
- Skye McCole Bartusiak (1992–2014)
- Dante Basco (born 1975)
- Lina Basquette (1907–1994)
- Joshua Bassett (born 2000)
- Gabriel Bateman (born 2004)
- Jason Bateman (born 1969)
- Justine Bateman (born 1966)
- Talitha Bateman (born 2001)
- Maggie Batson (born 2003)
- Miriam Battista (1912–1980)
- Matthew "Stymie" Beard (1925–1981)
- Jordana Beatty (born 1998)
- Jenny Beck (born 1974)
- Scotty Beckett (1929–1968)
- Brice Beckham (born 1976)
- Drake Bell (born 1986)
- Rachael Bella (born 1984)
- Landry Bender (born 2000)
- Julia Benjamin (born 1957)
- Haley Bennett (born 1988)
- Jimmy Bennett (born 1996)
- Rhona Bennett (born 1976)
- Melissa Benoist (born 1988)
- Ashley Benson (born 1989)
- Robby Benson (born 1956)
- Luke Benward (born 1995)
- Paris Berelc (born 1998)
- Justin Berfield (born 1986)
- Mary Kay Bergman (1961–1999)
- Elizabeth Berkley (born 1972)
- Milton Berle (1908–2002)
- Emma Berman (born 2008)
- Valerie Bertinelli (born 1960)
- Rishi Bhat (born 1984)
- Mayim Bialik (born 1975)
- Camren Bicondova (born 1999)
- Jessica Biel (born 1982)
- Peter Billingsley (born 1971)
- Thora Birch (born 1982)
- Lucas Black (born 1982)
- Asante Blackk (born 2001)
- Sofia Black-D'Elia (born 1991)
- Linda Blair (born 1959)
- Robert Blake (1933–2023)
- Rowan Blanchard (born 2001)
- Tempestt Bledsoe (born 1973)
- Corbin Bleu (born 1989)
- Kwesi Boakye (born 1999)
- Jonah Bobo (born 1997)
- Ashley Boettcher (born 2000)
- Danny Bonaduce (born 1959)
- Tommy "Butch" Bond (1926–2005)
- Lisa Bonet (born 1967)
- Chaz Bono (born 1969)
- Brian Bonsall (born 1981)
- Mika Boorem (born 1987)
- Samantha Boscarino (born 1994)
- Yale Boss (1899–1977)
- Zachary Bostrom (born 1981)
- Cameron Boyce (1999–2019)
- Cayden Boyd (born 1994)
- Jenna Boyd (born 1993)
- Jimmy Boyd (1939–2009)
- Lucy Boynton (born 1994)
- Jesse Bradford (born 1979)
- Jonathan Brandis (1976–2003)
- Karan Brar (born 1999)
- Steffani Brass (born 1992)
- Alexandra Breckenridge (born 1982)
- Abigail Breslin (born 1996)
- Spencer Breslin (born 1992)
- Chloe Bridges (born 1991)
- Jeff Bridges (born 1949)
- Todd Bridges (born 1965)
- Danielle Brisebois (born 1969)
- Tiffany Brissette (born 1974)
- Morgan Brittany (born 1951)
- Matthew Broderick (born 1962)
- Adrien Brody (born 1973)
- Josh Brolin (born 1968)
- Skylan Brooks (born 1999)
- Israel Broussard (born 1994)
- Issac Ryan Brown (born 2005)
- Kimberly J. Brown (born 1984)
- Miles Brown (born 2004)
- Philip Brown (born 1958)
- Tom Brown (1913–1990)
- Thomas Wilson Brown (born 1972)
- Agnes Bruckner (born 1985)
- Amy Bruckner (born 1991)
- Zachery Ty Bryan (born 1981)
- Clara Bryant (born 1985)
- Laura Bell Bundy (born 1981)
- Bobby Buntrock (1952–1974)
- Sonny Bupp (1928–2007)
- Bobby Burgess (born 1941)
- Max Burkholder (born 1997)
- Lonnie Burr (born 1943)
- Janet Burston (1935–1998)
- Paul Butcher (born 1994)
- Austin Butler (born 1991)
- Donna Butterworth (1956–2018)
- Amanda Bynes (born 1986)
- Eugene Byrd (born 1975)
- Darcy Rose Byrnes (born 1998)
- Jeffrey Byron (born 1955)

== C ==
- Brandon Call (born 1976)
- Candace Cameron Bure (born 1976)
- Dove Cameron (born 1996)
- Kirk Cameron (born 1970)
- Darby Camp (born 2007)
- Michael Campion (born 2002)
- Chandler Canterbury (born 1998)
- Ava Cantrell (born 2001)
- Nicolas Cantu (born 2003)
- Francesca Capaldi (born 2004)
- Robert Capron (born 1998)
- Irene Cara (1959–2022)
- Caitlin Carmichael (born 2004)
- Francis Carpenter (1910–1973)
- Sabrina Carpenter (born 1999)
- Seth Carr (born 2007)
- Corey Carrier (born 1980)
- Madeline Carroll (born 1996)
- Hunter Carson (born 1975)
- William Harper Carter (born 1939)
- Diana "Baby Peggy" Serra Cary (1918–2020)
- Kenneth Casey (1899–1965)
- John Cassisi (born 1963)
- Tricia Cast (born 1966)
- David Castro (born 1996)
- Christopher Castile (born 1980)
- Amy Castle (born 1990)
- Raquel Castro (born 1994)
- Shanley Caswell (born 1991)
- Field Cate (born 1997)
- Kyle Catlett (born 2002)
- Lacey Chabert (born 1982)
- Harrison Chad (born 1992)
- Brent Chalem (1975–1997)
- Jack Champion (born 2004)
- Rohan Chand (born 2004)
- Helen Chandler (1906–1965)
- Norman Chaney (1914–1936)
- Billy Chapin (1943–2016)
- Lauren Chapin (1945–2026)
- Michael Chapin (born 1936)
- Max Charles (born 2003)
- Daveigh Chase (1990–2026)
- Duane Chase (born 1950)
- Tylor Chase (born 1989)
- JC Chasez (born 1976)
- Kyle Chavarria (born 1995)
- Ian Chen (born 2006)
- Jake Cherry (born 1996)
- Elizabeth Cheshire (born 1967)
- Vanessa Lee Chester (born 1984)
- Rosalie Chiang (born 2005)
- Anna Chlumsky (born 1980)
- Justin Chon (born 1981)
- Kelsey Chow (born 1991)
- Danielle Chuchran (born 1993)
- Bobby Clark (1944–2021)
- Christie Clark (born 1973)
- Daniel Clark (born 1985)
- Spencer Treat Clark (born 1987)
- Joe Cobb (1916–2002)
- Junior Coghlan (1916–2009)
- George M. Cohan (1878–1942)
- Horace Cohen (born 1971)
- Jeff Cohen (born 1974)
- Mindy Cohn (born 1966)
- Tommy Cole (born 1941)
- Bobby Coleman (born 1997)
- Gary Coleman (1968–2010)
- Holliston Coleman (born 1992)
- Kathy Coleman (born 1962)
- Zoe Colletti (born 2001)
- William Collier Jr. (1902–1987)
- Cora Sue Collins (1927–2025)
- John Collum (1926–1962)
- Jackie Condon (1918–1977)
- Tim Considine (1940–2022)
- Didi Conn (born 1951)
- Bobby Connelly (1909–1922)
- Jennifer Connelly (born 1970)
- Christopher Convery (born 2008)
- Jackie Coogan (1914–1984)
- Keith Coogan (born 1970)
- Mason Cook (born 2000)
- Danny Cooksey (born 1975)
- Carol Coombs (born 1935)
- Jackie Cooper (1922–2011)
- Kevin Corcoran (1949–2015)
- Noreen Corcoran (1943–2016)
- Maddie Corman (born 1970)
- Miranda Cosgrove (born 1993)
- Dolores Costello (1903–1979)
- Helene Costello (1906–1957)
- Kami Cotler (born 1965)
- Nikki Cox (born 1978)
- Auliʻi Cravalho (born 2000)
- Johnny Crawford (1946–2021)
- Robert L. Crawford Jr. (born 1944)
- Michelle Creber (born 1999)
- Cody Christian (born 1995)
- Kaleigh Cronin (born 1989)
- Suzanne Crough (1963–2015)
- Cameron Crovetti (born 2008)
- Isabella Crovetti (born 2004)
- Rachel Crow (born 1998)
- Tonya Crowe (born 1971)
- Lucas Cruikshank (born 1993)
- Brandon Cruz (born 1962)
- Kieran Culkin (born 1982)
- Macaulay Culkin (born 1980)
- Rory Culkin (born 1989)
- Quinn Cummings (born 1967)
- Kaley Cuoco (born 1985)
- Kyliegh Curran (born 2005)
- Miley Cyrus (born 1992)
- Noah Cyrus (born 2000)

== D ==
- John Francis Daley (born 1985)
- Britain Dalton (born 2001)
- Gabriel Damon (born 1976)
- Viola Dana (1897–1987)
- Dorothy Dandridge (1922–1965)
- Claire Danes (born 1979)
- Bebe Daniels (1901–1971)
- Mickey Daniels (1914–1970)
- Braden Danner (born 1975)
- Ellie Darcey-Alden (born 1999)
- Jean Darling (1922–2015)
- Vondell Darr (1919–2012)
- Frankie Darro (1917–1976)
- Andrea Darvi (born 1952)
- Dee Dee Davis (born 1996)
- Jack Davis (1914–1992)
- Josie Davis (born 1973)
- Sammy Davis Jr. (1925–1990)
- Virginia Davis (1918–2009)
- Marjorie Daw (1902–1979)
- Rosario Dawson (born 1979)
- Dennis Day (1942–2018)
- Philippe De Lacy (1917–1995)
- Raphael De Niro (born 1976)
- Collin Dean (born 2005)
- Allie DeBerry (born 1994)
- Dorothy DeBorba (1925–2010)
- Thomas Dekker (born 1987)
- Kat Dennings (born 1986)
- Will Denton (born 1990)
- Sandy Descher (born 1945)
- Erik von Detten (born 1982)
- Terra Deva (born 1976)
- Kaitlyn Dever (born 1996)
- Brandon deWilde (1942–1972)
- Dustin Diamond (1977–2021)
- Leonardo DiCaprio (born 1974)
- Jessica DiCicco (born 1980)
- Matt Dillon (born 1964)
- Daniel DiMaggio (born 2003)
- Ethan Dizon (born 2002)
- Matt Doherty (born 1978)
- Shannen Doherty (1971–2024)
- Micky Dolenz (born 1945)
- Jason Dolley (born 1991)
- Meg Donnelly (born 2000)
- Johnny Doran (born 1962)
- Stephen Dorff (born 1973)
- Winston and Weston Doty (1914–1934)
- Portia Doubleday (born 1988)
- Tony Dow (1945–2022)
- Robert Downey Jr. (born 1965)
- Johnny Downs (1913–1994)
- Moosie Drier (born 1964)
- Bobby Driscoll (1937–1968)
- Jason Drucker (born 2005)
- Sally Dryer (born 1957)
- John Duda (born 1977)
- Hilary Duff (born 1987)
- Emma Duke (born 1996)
- Patty Duke (1946–2016)
- Donnie Dunagan (born 1934)
- Blair Dunlop (born 1992)
- Teala Dunn (born 1996)
- Kirsten Dunst (born 1982)
- Junior Durkin (1915–1935)
- Eliza Dushku (born 1980)
- Natalia Dyer (born 1995)

== E ==
- B. Reeves Eason Jr. (1914–1921)
- Alison Eastwood (born 1972)
- Francesca Eastwood (born 1993)
- Teddy Eccles (born 1955)
- Wallace Eddinger (1881–1929)
- Kelsey Edwards (born 1994)
- Marianne Edwards (1930–2013)
- Zac Efron (born 1987)
- Nicole Eggert (born 1972)
- Zach Tyler Eisen (born 1993)
- Hallie Kate Eisenberg (born 1992)
- Ike Eisenmann (born 1962)
- India Eisley (born 1993)
- Erika Eleniak (born 1969)
- Marie Eline (1902–1981)
- Casey Ellison (born 1975)
- Chase Ellison (born 1993)
- Andrea Elson (born 1969)
- Ethan Embry (born 1978)
- Jacqueline Emerson (born 1994)
- Tami Erin (born 1974)
- Scarlett Estevez (born 2007)
- Josh Ryan Evans (1982–2002)
- Madge Evans (1909–1981)
- Richard Eyer (born 1945)

== F ==
- Daeg Faerch (born 1995)
- Stanley Fafara (1949–2003)
- Tiger Fafara (born 1945)
- Joey Fallon (1941–1993)
- Dakota Fanning (born 1994)
- Elle Fanning (born 1998)
- Taissa Farmiga (born 1994)
- Farah Fath (born 1984)
- Oakes Fegley (born 2004)
- Corey Feldman (born 1971)
- Pamelyn Ferdin (born 1959)
- Stacy Ferguson (born 1975)
- Priah Ferguson (born 2006)
- Bijou Fernandez (1873–1961)
- Albert Fields (born 1975)
- Kim Fields (born 1969)
- Cameron Finley (born 1987)
- Danielle Fishel (born 1981)
- Carrie Fisher (1956–2016)
- Michael Fishman (born 1981)
- Elsie Fisher (born 2003)
- Jasen Fisher (born 1980)
- Minnie Maddern Fiske (1865–1932)
- Bobby Fite (born 1968)
- Maureen Flannigan (born 1973)
- Cailey Fleming (born 2007)
- Josh Flitter (born 1994)
- Erika Flores (born 1979)
- Benjamin Flores, Jr. (born 2002)
- Aiden Flowers (born 2004)
- Megan Follows (born 1968)
- Bridget Fonda (born 1964)
- Colin Ford (born 1996)
- Abby Ryder Fortson (born 2008)
- Brian Forster (born 1960)
- Ami Foster (born 1975)
- Blake Foster (born 1985)
- Buddy Foster (born 1957)
- Flora Foster (1898–1914)
- Jodie Foster (born 1962)
- Megan Fox (born 1986)
- Michael J. Fox (born 1961)
- Jaimee Foxworth (born 1979)
- Mackenzie Foy (born 2000)
- Melissa Francis (born 1972)
- Amber Frank (born 1998)
- Griffin Frazen (born 1987)
- Will Friedle (born 1976)
- Sean Frye (born 1966)
- Soleil Moon Frye (born 1976)
- Annette Funicello (1942–2013)
- Isabelle Fuhrman (born 1997)
- Emma Fuhrmann (born 2001)
- Edward Furlong (born 1977)

== G ==
- Ariel Gade (born 1997)
- Pierce Gagnon (born 2005)
- Johnny Galecki (born 1975)
- Aidan Gallagher (born 2003)
- David Gallagher (born 1985)
- Mason Gamble (born 1986)
- Nathan Gamble (born 1998)
- Luis Armand Garcia (born 1992)
- Virginia Gardner (born 1995)
- Judy Garland (1922–1969)
- Betsy Gay (1929–2025)
- Jeremy Gelbwaks (born 1961)
- Sarah Michelle Gellar (born 1977)
- Lisa Gerritsen (born 1957)
- Jami Gertz (born 1965)
- Balthazar Getty (born 1975)
- Mary Gibbs (born 1996)
- Timothy Gibbs (born 1967)
- Mimi Gibson (born 1948)
- Jonathan Gilbert (born 1967)
- Melissa Gilbert (born 1964)
- Sara Gilbert (born 1975)
- Keir Gilchrist (born 1992)
- Elizabeth Gillies (born 1993)
- Sarah Gilman (born 1996)
- Jared S. Gilmore (born 2000)
- Marc Gilpin (1966–2023)
- Dorothy Gish (1898–1968)
- Toni Ann Gisondi (born 1975)
- Skyler Gisondo (born 1996)
- Phillip Glasser (born 1978)
- Dale Godboldo (born 1975)
- Angela Goethals (born 1977)
- Missy Gold (born 1970)
- Tracey Gold (born 1969)
- Norman D. Golden II (born 1984)
- Selena Gomez (born 1992)
- Harold Goodwin (1902–1987)
- Kia Goodwin (born 1973)
- Lecy Goranson (born 1974)
- Molly Gordon (born 1994)
- Zachary Gordon (born 1998)
- Joseph Gordon-Levitt (born 1981)
- Jack Gore (born 2004 or 2005)
- Ryan Gosling (born 1980)
- Mark-Paul Gosselaar (born 1974)
- Alexander Gould (born 1994)
- Kelly Gould (born 1999)
- Nolan Gould (born 1998)
- Andre Gower (born 1973)
- Dakota Goyo (born 1999)
- Mckenna Grace (born 2006)
- Todd Graff (born 1959)
- Ariana Grande (born 1993)
- Allie Grant (born 1994)
- Bonita Granville (1923–1988)
- Ben Grauer (1908–1977)
- Gary Gray (1936–2006)
- Taylor Gray (born 1993)
- Jack Dylan Grazer (born 2003)
- Brian Austin Green (born 1973)
- Seth Green (born 1974)
- Ariana Greenblatt (born 2007)
- Lindsay and Sidney Greenbush (born 1970)
- Zack O'Malley Greenburg (born 1985)
- Lizzy Greene (born 2003)
- Benji Gregory (1978–2024)
- Natalie Gregory (born 1975)
- Gordon Griffith (1907–1958)
- Camryn Grimes (born 1990)
- Karolyn Grimes (born 1940)
- Arye Gross (born 1960)
- Cary Guffey (born 1972)
- Devon Gummersall (born 1978)

== H ==
- Lukas Haas (born 1976)
- Albert Hackett (1900–1995)
- Julie Anne Haddock (born 1965)
- Emily Hahn (born 2000)
- Nikki Hahn (born 2002)
- Douglas Haig (1920–2011)
- Corey Haim (1971–2010)
- Donald Haines (1919–1943)
- Khrystyne Haje (born 1968)
- Imani Hakim (born 1993)
- Lucy Hale (born 1989)
- Tiffini Hale (1975–2021)
- Anthony Michael Hall (born 1968)
- Bug Hall (born 1985)
- Deedee Magno Hall (born 1975)
- Hanna R. Hall (born 1984)
- Katie Beth Hall (born 2005)
- Luke Halpin (born 1947)
- Courtney Halverson (born 1989)
- Rusty Hamer (1947–1990)
- Sally Hamlin (1902–1987)
- Brandon Hammond (born 1984)
- Nicholas Hammond (born 1950)
- Sophia Hammons (born 2006)
- Chasen Hampton (born 1976)
- Adam Hann-Byrd (born 1982)
- Alyson Hannigan (born 1974)
- G. Hannelius (born 1998)
- Elisabeth Harnois (born 1979)
- David W. Harper (born 1961)
- Shane Harper (born 1993)
- Rebecca Harrell (born 1980)
- Caleel Harris (born 2003)
- Danielle Harris (born 1977)
- Mildred Harris (1901–1944)
- Neil Patrick Harris (born 1973)
- Melissa Joan Hart (born 1976)
- Bobby Harron (1893–1920)
- LuAnn Haslam (born 1953)
- Anne Hathaway (born 1982)
- Noah Hathaway (born 1971)
- Ethan Hawke (born 1970)
- Jimmy Hawkins (born 1941)
- Joey Heatherton (born 1944)
- Anne Heche (1970–2022)
- Katherine Heigl (born 1978)
- Jonathan Morgan Heit (born 2000)
- Mariel Hemingway (born 1961)
- Lauri Hendler (born 1965)
- Lorenzo James Henrie (born 1993)
- Ely Henry (born 1991)
- Justin Henry (born 1971)
- Garette Ratliff Henson (born 1980)
- Elden Henson (born 1977)
- Charles Herbert (1948–2015)
- Bijou Heron (1862–1937)
- Whitby Hertford (born 1978)
- Fraser Clarke Heston (born 1955)
- Jennifer Love Hewitt (born 1979)
- Adam Hicks (born 1992)
- Darryl Hickman (1931–2024)
- Dana Hill (1964–1996)
- Hallee Hirsh (born 1987)
- Mara Hobel (born 1971)
- Eddie Hodges (born 1947)
- Henry Hodges (born 1993)
- Tyler Hoechlin (born 1987)
- Gaby Hoffmann (born 1982)
- Cheryl Holdridge (1944–2009)
- Willa Holland (born 1991)
- Olivia Holt (born 1997)
- Darla Hood (1931–1979)
- Jacob Hopkins (born 2002)
- Nikita Hopkins (born 1991)
- Michelle Horn (born 1987)
- Clara Horton (1904–1976)
- Allen Hoskins (1920–1980)
- Kaylee Hottle (2008–2026)
- Marques Houston (born 1981)
- Bryce Dallas Howard (born 1981)
- Clint Howard (born 1959)
- Leo Howard (born 1997)
- Ron Howard (born 1954)
- C. Thomas Howell (born 1966)
- Vanessa Hudgens (born 1988)
- Miko Hughes (born 1986)
- Helen Hunt (born 1963)
- Jimmy Hunt (1939–2025)
- Paige Hurd (born 1992)
- Josh Hutcherson (born 1992)
- Bobby Hutchins (1925–1945)
- Craig Huxley (born 1954)
- Sarah Hyland (born 1990)

== I ==
- David Iacono (born 2002)
- René Ifrah (born 1972)
- Robin Ignico (born 1970)
- Teddy Infuhr (1936–2007)
- Mary Jane Irving (1913–1983)

== J ==
- Terrence J (born 1982)
- Eugene Jackson (1916–2001)
- Janet Jackson (born 1966)
- Joshua Jackson (born 1978)
- Leeah D. Jackson (born 1998)
- Mary Ann Jackson (1923–2003)
- Michael Jackson (1958–2009)
- Marlon Jackson (born 1957)
- Jermaine Jackson (born 1954)
- Skai Jackson (born 2002)
- Taliesin Jaffe (born 1977)
- Gennie James (born 1976)
- Claude Jarman Jr. (1934–2025)
- Sybil Jason (1927-2011)
- Billy Jayne (born 1969)
- Carla Jeffery (born 1993)
- Carlon Jeffery (born 1993)
- Mia Sinclair Jenness (born 2005)
- Ruby Jerins (born 1998)
- Sterling Jerins (born 2004)
- Ann Jillian (born 1950)
- Courtney Jines (born 1992)
- Alexandra Johnes (born 1976)
- Ashley Johnson (born 1983)
- Bayn Johnson (born 1958)
- Cherie Johnson (born 1975)
- Jack Johnson (born 1987)
- Joshua Caleb Johnson (born 2005)
- JoJo (born 1990)
- Frankie Jonas (born 2000)
- Nick Jonas (born 1992)
- Angus T. Jones (born 1993)
- Anissa Jones (1958–1976)
- Dickie Jones (1927–2014)
- Jeremy Jordan (born 1984)
- Michael B. Jordan (born 1987)
- Montana Jordan (born 2003)
- Milla Jovovich (born 1975)
- Malese Jow (born 1991)
- Gloria Joy (1910–1970)
- Jet Jurgensmeyer (born 2004)
- Victoria Justice (born 1993)
- Christian Juttner (born 1965)

== K ==
- Elena Kampouris (born 1997)
- Kym Karath (born 1958)
- Jensen Karp (aka "Hot Karl", born 1979)
- Omri Katz (born 1976)
- Dominic Scott Kay (born 1996)
- Melody Kay (born 1979)
- Darwood Kaye (1929–2002)
- Staci Keanan (born 1975)
- Buster Keaton (1895–1966)
- Josh Keaton (born 1979)
- Andrew Keenan-Bolger (born 1985)
- Richard Keith (born 1950)
- Ayla Kell (born 1990)
- Malcolm David Kelley (born 1992)
- Gregory Kelly (1892–1927)
- Jean Louisa Kelly (born 1972)
- Paul Kelly (1899–1956)
- Ricky Kelman (born 1949)
- Kyla Kenedy (born 2003)
- Annamarie Kenoyer (born 1994)
- Margaret Kerry (born 1929)
- Lance Kerwin (1960–2023)
- Alicia Keys (born 1981)
- Leonard Kibrick (1924–1993)
- Sidney Kibrick (1928–2026)
- Kaleena Kiff (born 1974)
- Q'orianka Kilcher (born 1990)
- Cammie King (1934–2010)
- Joey King (born 1999)
- Regina King (born 1971)
- Nikolai Kinski (born 1976)
- Tommy Kirk (1941–2021)
- Hayley Kiyoko (born 1991)
- Christopher Knight (born 1957)
- Keshia Knight Pulliam (born 1979)
- Aramis Knight (born 1999)
- Maxim Knight (born 1999)
- Marilyn Knowlden (1926–2025)
- Frederick Koehler (born 1975)
- Andrew Koenig (1968–2010)
- Melanie Kohn (born 1964)
- Scott Kolden (born 1962)
- Ava Kolker (born 2006)
- Mary Kornman (1915–1973)
- Mildred Kornman (1925–2022)
- Charlie Korsmo (born 1978)
- Sammi Kane Kraft (1992–2012)
- Jane Krakowski (born 1968)
- Nathan Kress (born 1992)
- Eva Lee Kuney (1934–2015)
- Mila Kunis (born 1983)
- Katy Kurtzman (born 1965)

== L ==
- Shia LaBeouf (born 1986)
- Matthew Labyorteaux (born 1966)
- Patrick Labyorteaux (born 1965)
- Christine Lakin (born 1979)
- Phil LaMarr (born 1967)
- Leonard Landy (1933–2017)
- Diane Lane (born 1965)
- Brie Larson (born 1989)
- David Lascher (born 1972)
- Christa Larson (born 1979)
- Chloe Rose Lattanzi (born 1986)
- Billy Laughlin (1932–1948)
- Oona Laurence (born 2002)
- Taylor Lautner (born 1992)
- Zachary LaVoy (born 1986)
- Matilda Lawler (born 2008)
- Andrew Lawrence (born 1988)
- Jennifer Lawrence (born 1990)
- Joey Lawrence (born 1976)
- Matthew Lawrence (born 1980)
- Nicole Leach (born 1979)
- Bessie Learn (1888–1987)
- Billy Lee (1929–1989)
- Davey Lee (1924–2008)
- Eugene Gordon Lee (1933–2005)
- Lila Lee (1901–1973)
- Peyton Elizabeth Lee (born 2004)
- Ryan Lee (born 1996)
- Trent Lehman (1961–1982)
- Amanda Leighton (born 1993)
- Braeden Lemasters (born 1996)
- Logan Lerman (born 1992)
- Elsie Leslie (1881–1966)
- Samm Levine (born 1982)
- Emmanuel Lewis (born 1971)
- Juliette Lewis (born 1973)
- Leah Lewis (born 1996)
- Ashley Liao (born 2001)
- Liana Liberato (born 1995)
- Jennifer Lien (born 1974)
- Kristen Li (born 2002)
- Morgan Lily (born 2000)
- Alyvia Alyn Lind (born 2007)
- Emily Alyn Lind (born 2002)
- Natalie Alyn Lind (born 2000)
- Amy Linker (born 1966)
- Cody Linley (born 1989)
- Mackenzie Lintz (born 1996)
- Madison Lintz (born 1999)
- Matt Lintz (born 2001)
- Alex D. Linz (born 1989)
- Jonathan Lipnicki (born 1990)
- Peyton List (born 1998)
- Dallas Liu (born 2001)
- Blake Lively (born 1987)
- Jason Lively (born 1968)
- Robyn Lively (born 1972)
- Danny Lloyd (born 1972)
- Eric Lloyd (born 1986)
- Jake Lloyd (born 1989)
- Spencer Locke (born 1991)
- Emma Lockhart (born 1994)
- June Lockhart (1925–2025)
- Laila Lockhart Kraner (born 2008)
- June Lockhart (1925–2025)
- Cirroc Lofton (born 1978)
- Lindsay Lohan (born 1986)
- Noah Lomax (born 2001)
- Carole Lombard (1908–1942)
- Nia Long (born 1970)
- Mike Lookinland (born 1960)
- Mario Lopez (born 1973)
- Samantha Lorraine (born 2007)
- Lisa Loring (1958–2023)
- Mary Lou (born 1992)
- Lori Loughlin (born 1964)
- Demi Lovato (born 1992)
- Chad Lowe (born 1968)
- Rob Lowe (born 1964)
- Lisa Lucas (born 1961)
- Tony Lucca (born 1976)
- Alfred Lutter (born 1962)
- Emma Rayne Lyle (born 2003)
- Dawn Lyn (born 1963)
- Ross Lynch (born 1995)
- Carol Lynley (1942–2019)
- Sue Lyon (1946–2019)
- Natasha Lyonne (born 1979)

== M ==
- Gavin MacIntosh (born 1999)
- Ralph Macchio (born 1961)
- Allison Mack (born 1982)
- Bailee Madison (born 1999)
- Ari Magder (1983–2012)
- Deedee Magno (born 1975)
- Kaitlyn Maher (born 2004)
- Kayla Maisonet (born 1999)
- Tina Majorino (born 1985)
- Christopher Maleki (born 1964)
- Jena Malone (born 1984)
- Milo Manheim (born 2001)
- Laura Marano (born 1995)
- Vanessa Marano (born 1992)
- Kipp Marcus (born 1970)
- Sparky Marcus (born 1967)
- Ellen Marlow (born 1994)
- Michael C. Maronna (born 1977)
- Sean Marquette (born 1988)
- Jason Marsden (born 1975)
- Sean Marshall (born 1965)
- Vincent Martella (born 1992)
- Jaeden Martell (born 2003)
- Graham Patrick Martin (born 1991)
- Kellie Martin (born 1975)
- Lori Martin (1947–2010)
- Marsai Martin (born 2004)
- Meaghan Martin (born 1992)
- Shirley Mason (1901–1979)
- Christopher Massey (born 1989)
- Kyle Massey (born 1991)
- Christopher Masterson (born 1980)
- Danny Masterson (born 1976)
- Gaten Matarazzo (born 2002)
- Heather Matarazzo (born 1982)
- Jerry Mathers (born 1948)
- Jim Mathers (born 1955)
- Tim Matheson (born 1947)
- Larry Mathews (born 1955)
- Julianna Rose Mauriello (born 1991)
- MacKenzie Mauzy (born 1988)
- Abigail Mavity (born 1993)
- Joseph Mazzello (born 1983)
- Rose Marie Mazzetta (aka Baby Rose Marie) (1923–2017)
- Anndi McAfee (born 1979)
- Scott McAfee (born 1981)
- Mary McAllister (1908–1991)
- Hailey McCann (born 1995)
- Jesse McCartney (born 1987)
- China Anne McClain (born 1998)
- Kendall McComas (1916–1981)
- Patty McCormack (born 1945)
- Maureen McCormick (born 1956)
- Sierra McCormick (born 1997)
- Darius McCrary (born 1976)
- JD McCrary (born 2007)
- Kimberly McCullough (born 1978)
- Jennette McCurdy (born 1992)
- Miriam McDonald (born 1987)
- Mary Elizabeth McDonough (born 1961)
- George McFarland (1928–1993)
- Michael McGreevey (born 1948)
- Lia McHugh (born 2005)
- Danica McKellar (born 1975)
- Fay McKenzie (1918–2019)
- Doug McKeon (born 1966)
- Nancy McKeon (born 1966)
- Philip McKeon (1964–2019)
- Caleb McLaughlin (born 2001)
- Elizabeth McLaughlin (born 1993)
- Jimmy McNichol (born 1961)
- Kristy McNichol (born 1962)
- Courtland Mead (born 1987)
- Hudson Meek (2008–2024)
- Kate Melton (born 1992)
- David Mendenhall (born 1971)
- Bridgit Mendler (born 1992)
- Heather Menzies (1949–2017)
- Ryan Merriman (born 1983)
- Caitlin EJ Meyer (born 1992)
- Victoria Paige Meyerink (born 1960)
- Ari Meyers (born 1969)
- Melissa Michaelsen (born 1968)
- Amanda Michalka (born 1991)
- Amber Midthunder (born 1997)
- Drew Mikuska (born 1994)
- Alyssa Milano (born 1972)
- Amiah Miller (born 2004)
- Hadley Belle Miller (born 2004)
- Jeremy Miller (born 1976)
- McKaley Miller (born 1996)
- Shirley Mills (1926–2010)
- Zach Mills (born 1995)
- Aedin Mincks (born 2000)
- Sal Mineo (1939–1976)
- Rachel Miner (born 1980)
- Beverley Mitchell (born 1981)
- Ilan Mitchell-Smith (born 1969)
- Kel Mitchell (born 1978)
- Miyako (born 2007)
- Roger Mobley (born 1949)
- Sharyn Moffett (1936–2021)
- Isobelle Molloy (born 2000)
- Hilary Momberger (born 1962)
- Taylor Momsen (born 1993)
- Cameron Monaghan (born 1993)
- Isabela Moner (born 2001)
- Dickie Moore (1925–2015)
- Mandy Moore (born 1984)
- Mickey Moore (1914–2013)
- Erin Moran (1960–2017)
- Rita Moreno (born 1931)
- Chloë Grace Moretz (born 1997)
- Trevor Morgan (born 1986)
- Matt Morris (born 1979)
- Ernie Morrison (1912–1989)
- Kenny Morrison (born 1974)
- Senta Moses (born 1973)
- Elisabeth Moss (born 1982)
- Taj Mowry (born 1986)
- Tamera Mowry (born 1978)
- Tia Mowry (born 1978)
- Bill Mumy (born 1954)
- Liliana Mumy (born 1994)
- Noah Munck (born 1996)
- Frankie Muniz (born 1985)
- Brittany Murphy (1977–2009)
- Erin Murphy (born 1964)
- Maurice Murphy (1913–1978)
- Mitchel Musso (born 1991)
- Barbara Myers (aka Barbara Ellen Myers) (born 1946)
- Helen Myres (aka Baby Marie) (1911–2010)

== N ==
- Katelyn Nacon (born 1999)
- John P. Navin Jr. (born 1968)
- Tyler Neitzel (born 1991)
- Haywood Nelson (born 1960)
- Evelyn Nesbit (1884 or 1885–1967)
- Christina Nigra (born 1975)
- Alexa Nikolas (born 1992)
- Thomas Ian Nicholas (born 1980)
- Lorraine Nicholson (born 1990)
- Denise Nickerson (1957–2019)
- Brady Noon (born 2005)
- Tommy Norden (born 1952)
- Jace Norman (born 2000)
- Jay North (1951–2025)
- Judy Norton (born 1958)
- Judy Nugent (1940–2023)

== O ==
- Austin O'Brien (born 1981)
- Cubby O'Brien (born 1946)
- Margaret O'Brien (born 1937)
- Ryan O'Donohue (born 1984)
- Griffin O'Neal (born 1964)
- Tatum O'Neal (born 1963)
- Amy O'Neill (born 1971)
- Heather O'Rourke (1975–1988)
- Ethelmary Oakland (1909–1999)
- Raymond Ochoa (born 2001)
- Ryan Ochoa (born 1996)
- Georg Olden (born 1968)
- Wyatt Oleff (born 2003)
- Barret Oliver (born 1973)
- Robert Oliveri (born 1978)
- Elizabeth Olsen (born 1989)
- Mary-Kate and Ashley Olsen also known as The Olsen Twins (born 1986)
- Susan Olsen (born 1961)
- Renee Olstead (born 1989)
- Miles Orman (born 1984)
- Jenna Ortega (born 2002)
- Emily Osment (born 1992)
- Haley Joel Osment (born 1988)
- Ken Osmond (1943–2020)
- Peter Ostrum (born 1957)
- Ian Ousley (born 2002)

== P ==
- Manuel Padilla, Jr. (1955–2008)
- Phillip Paley (born 1963)
- Damon Pampolina (born 1975)
- Danielle Panabaker (born 1987)
- Kay Panabaker (born 1990)
- Hayden Panettiere (1989–2026)
- Jansen Panettiere (1994–2023)
- Ty Panitz (born 1999)
- Connor Paolo (born 1990)
- Sarah Jessica Parker (born 1965)
- Van Dyke Parks (born 1943)
- Janel Parrish (born 1988)
- Butch Patrick (born 1953)
- Rahsaan Patterson (born 1974)
- Aaron Paul (born 1979)
- Marcus T. Paulk (born 1986)
- Sara Paxton (born 1988)
- James Paxton (born 1994)
- Michael Pearlman (born 1972)
- Josh Peck (born 1986)
- Meeno Peluce (born 1970)
- Nicola Peltz (born 1995)
- Karen Pendleton (1946–2019)
- Sean Penn (born 1960)
- Radames Pera (born 1960)
- Gerald Perreau-Saissine (1938–2002)
- Gigi Perreau (born 1941)
- Bradley Steven Perry (born 1998)
- Bernadette Peters (born 1948)
- Pat Petersen (born 1966)
- Paul Petersen (born 1945)
- Amanda Peterson (1971–2015)
- Madison Pettis (born 1998)
- Jade Pettyjohn (born 2000)
- Marlowe Peyton (born 2004)
- Shawn Phelan (1975–1998)
- Vonda Phelps (1915–2004)
- Mackenzie Phillips (born 1959)
- River Phoenix (1970–1993)
- Alexandra Picatto (born 1983)
- Bradley Pierce (born 1982)
- Nicolette Pierini (born 2003)
- Danny Pintauro (born 1976)
- Leah Pipes (born 1988)
- Dana Plato (1964–1999)
- Martha Plimpton (born 1970)
- Eve Plumb (born 1958)
- Charlie Plummer (born 1999)
- Max Pomeranc (born 1984)
- Scarlett Pomers (born 1988)
- Alisan Porter (born 1981)
- Todd Porter (born 1968)
- Natalie Portman (born 1981)
- Tyler Posey (born 1991)
- Kyla Pratt (born 1986)
- Georgie Price (1901–1964)
- Jon Provost (born 1950)
- Harold Pruett (1969–2002)
- Fátima Ptacek (born 2000)
- Devyn Puett (born 1977)
- Tommy Puett (born 1971)

== Q ==
- Ke Huy Quan (born 1971)
- Juanita Quigley (1931–2017)
- Eddie Quillan (1907–1990)
- Aileen Quinn (born 1971)
- Molly C. Quinn (born 1993)

== R ==
- Addison Rae (born 2000)
- Naelee Rae (born 1996)
- Ted Raimi (born 1965)
- Leven Rambin (born 1990)
- Cierra Ramirez (born 1995)
- Haley Ramm (born 1992)
- Nathalia Ramos (born 1992)
- Lexi Randall (born 1980)
- Terrell Ransom Jr. (b. 2003)
- Devin Ratray (born 1977)
- Raven-Symoné (born 1985)
- Jillian Rose Reed (born 1991)
- Zoe Renee (born 1997)
- Mason Reese (born 1965)
- Kittens Reichert (1910–1990)
- Bruce Reitherman (born 1955)
- Brad Renfro (1982–2008)
- Kelly Reno (born 1966)
- Tommy Rettig (1941–1996)
- Raegan Revord (born 2008)
- Ernie Reyes, Jr. (born 1972)
- Sophie Reynolds (born 1999)
- Alfonso Ribeiro (born 1971)
- Christina Ricci (born 1980)
- Isabella Rice (born 2006)
- Adam Rich (1968–2023)
- Ariana Richards (born 1979)
- Kim Richards (born 1964)
- Kyle Richards (born 1969)
- Jake Richardson (born 1985)
- Tequan Richmond (born 1992)
- Jason James Richter (born 1980)
- Shirley Jean Rickert (1926–2009)
- Lucille Ricksen (1910–1925)
- Stefanie Ridel (born 1973)
- Dean Riesner (1918–2002)
- Chandler Riggs (born 1999)
- Noah Ringer (born 1996)
- Molly Ringwald (born 1968)
- Rodney Allen Rippy (born 1968)
- Robbie Rist (born 1964)
- Naya Rivera (1987–2020)
- AnnaSophia Robb (born 1993)
- Avalon Robbins (born 2001)
- Peter Robbins (1956–2022)
- Emma Roberts (born 1991)
- Britt Robertson (born 1990)
- Oliver Robins (born 1971)
- Nick Robinson (born 1995)
- Olivia Rodrigo (born 2003)
- Rico Rodriguez (born 1998)
- Kylie Rogers (born 2004)
- Saoirse Ronan (born 1994)
- Mickey Rooney (1920–2014)
- Jeanine Ann Roose (1937–2021)
- Mackenzie Rosman (born 1989)
- Shavar Ross (born 1971)
- Emmy Rossum (born 1986)
- Cooper Roth (born 2000)
- Ella Rubin (born 2001)
- Sara Rue (born 1979)
- Joshua Rush (born 2001)
- Jared Rushton (born 1974)
- Del Russel (1952–2015)
- Grayson Russell (born 1998)
- Jeannie Russell (born 1950)
- Keri Russell (born 1976)
- Kurt Russell (born 1951)
- Wyatt Russell (born 1986)
- Debby Ryan (born 1993)
- Winona Ryder (born 1971)

== S ==
- Daryl Sabara (born 1992)
- Sabu (1924–1963)
- Katie Sagona (born 1989)
- Benjamin Salisbury (born 1980)
- Andy Samuel (1909–1995)
- Skyler Samuels (born 1994)
- Erin Sanders (born 1991)
- C. J. Sanders (born 1996)
- Sunny Sandler (born 2008)
- Renee Sands (born 1974)
- Ben Savage (born 1980)
- Fred Savage (born 1976)
- Hal Scardino (born 1984)
- Glenn Scarpelli (born 1966)
- Cassie Scerbo (born 1990)
- Tarah Lynne Schaeffer (born 1984)
- Rob Schneider (born 1963)
- Atticus Shaffer (born 1998)
- Kevin Schmidt (born 1988)
- Noah Schnapp (born 2004)
- Ricky Schroder (born 1970)
- Emily Schulman (born 1977)
- Keith and Kevin Schultz aka: The Schultz Twins (born 1953)
- Aaron Schwartz (born 1981)
- Scott Schwartz (born 1968)
- Patrick Schwarzenegger (born 1993)
- Emma Schweiger (born 2002)
- Stefanie Scott (born 1996)
- Ronnie Scribner (born 1966)
- Rick Segall (born 1969)
- Johnny Sequoyah (born 2002)
- Brendan Sexton III (born 1980)
- Clifford Severn (1925–2014)
- Amanda Seyfried (born 1985)
- Jeremy Shada (born 1997)
- Atticus Shaffer (born 1998)
- Milly Shapiro (born 2002)
- Brighton Sharbino (born 2002)
- Saxon Sharbino (born 1999)
- Michael Sharrett (born 1965)
- Vinessa Shaw (born 1976)
- Eric Shea (born 1960)
- Michael Shea (born 1952)
- Ally Sheedy (born 1962)
- Johnny Sheffield (1931–2010)
- Uriah Shelton (born 1997)
- Justin Shenkarow (born 1980)
- Eden Sher (born 1991)
- Brooke Shields (born 1965)
- Willow Shields (born 2000)
- Kiernan Shipka (born 1999)
- Madisyn Shipman (born 2002)
- Anne Shirley (1918–1993)
- Roberta Shore (born 1943)
- Charlie Shotwell (born 2007)
- Saniyya Sidney (born 2006)
- Nina Siemaszko (born 1970)
- Katie Silverman (born 2005)
- Alicia Silverstone (born 1976)
- Ryan Simpkins (born 1998)
- Jaz Sinclair (born 1994)
- Sadie Sink (born 2002)
- Larry Simms (1934–2009)
- Ty Simpkins (born 2001)
- Casey Simpson (born 2004)
- Wesley Singerman (born 1990)
- Kofi Siriboe (born 1994)
- Louanne Sirota (born 1970)
- Emily Skinner (born 2002)
- Anna Slotky (born 1981)
- Allison Smith (born 1969)
- Jaden Smith (born 1998)
- Jamil Walker Smith (born 1982)
- Jay R. Smith (1915–2002)
- Paris Smith (born 2000)
- Samantha Smith (1972–1985)
- Shawnee Smith (born 1969)
- Taran Noah Smith (born 1984)
- Willow Smith (born 2000)
- Brittany Snow (born 1986)
- Dylan Riley Snyder (born 1997)
- Leelee Sobieski (born 1983)
- Chloe Sonnenfeld (born 1993)
- Brenda Song (born 1988)
- Rosanne Sorrentino (born 1968)
- Martin Spanjers (born 1987)
- Harry Spear (1921–2006)
- Britney Spears (born 1981)
- Jamie Lynn Spears (born 1991)
- Tori Spelling (born 1973)
- Danielle Spencer (1965–2025)
- Sasha Spielberg (born 1990)
- Dylan and Cole Sprouse (born 1992)
- Shannon Spruill (born 1975)
- Kristoff St. John (1966–2019)
- Nick Stahl (born 1979)
- Sage Stallone (1976–2012)
- Martin Starr (born 1982)
- Steele Stebbins (born 2003)
- Hailee Steinfeld (born 1996)
- Amandla Stenberg (born 1998)
- Jon Paul Steuer (1984–2018)
- Carl Steven (1974–2011)
- Rusty Stevens (born 1948)
- Kristen Stewart (born 1990)
- Julia Stiles (born 1981)
- Garren Stitt (born 2003)
- Dean Stockwell (1936–2021)
- David Stollery (born 1941)
- Emma Stone (born 1988)
- Jennifer Stone (born 1993)
- Alyson Stoner (born 1993)
- Kirsten Storms (born 1984)
- Kelcie Stranahan (born 1992)
- Marcia Strassman (1948–2014)
- Fina Strazza (born 2005)
- Tami Stronach (born 1972)
- Rider Strong (born 1979)
- Tara Strong (born 1973)
- Jeremy Suarez (born 1990)
- Sunny Suljic (born 2005)
- Erik Per Sullivan (born 1991)
- Cree Summer (born 1969)
- Jeremy Sumpter (born 1989)
- Jerry Supiran (born 1973)
- Dominique Swain (born 1980)
- Buddy Swan (1929–1993)
- Hilary Swank (born 1974)
- Alison Sweeney (born 1976)
- Blanche Sweet (1896–1986)
- Madylin Sweeten (born 1991)
- Sawyer Sweeten (1995–2015)
- Jodie Sweetin (born 1982)
- Susan Swift (born 1964)
- Carl Switzer (1927–1959)

== T ==
- Charlie Tahan (born 1998)
- Daisy Tahan (born 2001)
- Stephen Talbot (born 1949)
- Mia Talerico (born 2008)
- Danny Tamberelli (born 1982)
- Amber Tamblyn (born 1983)
- Katelyn Tarver (born 1989)
- Elizabeth Taylor (1932–2011)
- Jackie Lynn Taylor (1925–2014)
- Jeremy Ray Taylor (born 2003)
- Scout Taylor-Compton (born 1989)
- Shirley Temple (1928–2014)
- Fay Templeton (1865–1939)
- Benj Thall (born 1978)
- Byron Thames (born 1969)
- Mason Thames (born 2007)
- Sophie Thatcher (born 2000)
- Russell Thaw (1910–1984)
- Paris Themmen (born 1959)
- Max Thieriot (born 1988)
- Tiffani Thiessen (born 1974)
- Billie "Buckwheat" Thomas (1931–1980)
- Eddie Kaye Thomas (born 1980)
- Frankie Thomas (1921–2006)
- Henry Thomas (born 1971)
- Jake Thomas (born 1990)
- Jonathan Taylor Thomas (born 1981)
- Leon Thomas III (born 1993)
- Richard Thomas (born 1951)
- Kenan Thompson (born 1978)
- Bella Thorne (born 1997)
- Khleo Thomas (born 1989)
- Justin Timberlake (born 1981)
- Addison Timlin (born 1991)
- Adair Tishler (born 1996)
- Brian Tochi (born 1959)
- Heather Tom (born 1975)
- Nicholle Tom (born 1978)
- Shawn Toovey (born 1983)
- Lane Toran (born 1982)
- Josie Totah (born 2001)
- Doreen Tracey (1943–2018)
- Michelle Trachtenberg (1985–2025)
- Verne Troyer (1969–2018)
- Thalia Tran (born 2006)
- Albert Tsai (born 2004)
- Jerry Tucker (1925–2016)
- Ruby Rose Turner (born 2005)
- Blake and Dylan Tuomy-Wilhoit (born 1990)
- Debbie Turner (born 1956)

== U ==
- Billy Unger (born 1995)

== V ==
- Phillip Van Dyke (born 1984)
- Dick Van Patten (1928–2015)
- Tasia Valenza (born 1967)
- Sofia Vassilieva (born 1992)
- Alexa Vega (born 1988)
- Makenzie Vega (born 1994)
- Lalaine Vergara-Paras (born 1987)
- Izabela Vidovic (born 2001)
- Alex Vincent (born 1981)
- Mike Vitar (born 1978)
- Mitch Vogel (born 1956)
- Jenna von Oÿ (born 1977)
- Lark Voorhies (born 1974)

== W ==
- Caitlin Wachs (born 1989)
- Christopher Walken (born 1943)
- Eric Walker (born 1970)
- Paul Walker (1973–2013)
- Aria Wallace (born 1996)
- Quvenzhané Wallis (born 2003)
- Jon Walmsley (born 1956)
- Maiara Walsh (born 1988)
- Izaac Wang (born 2007)
- Jonathan Ward (born 1970)
- Maitland Ward (born 1977)
- Malcolm-Jamal Warner (1970–2025)
- Gavin Warren (born 2008)
- John David Washington (born 1984)
- Angela Watson (born 1975)
- Coy Watson (1912–2009)
- Bobs Watson (1930–1999)
- Delmar Watson (1926–2008)
- Harry Watson (1921–2001)
- Melanie Watson Bernhardt (1968–2025)
- Cara Mia Wayans (born 1987)
- Damien Dante Wayans (born 1980)
- Damon Wayans, Jr. (born 1982)
- Michael Wayans (born 1985)
- Ken Weatherwax (1955–2014)
- Jason Weaver (born 1979)
- Chad Webber (born 1960)
- Ernie Weckbaugh (1931–2010)
- Mike Weinberg (born 1993)
- Scott Weinger (born 1975)
- Malina Weissman (born 2003)
- Tuesday Weld (born 1943)
- Tracy Wells (born 1971)
- Devon Werkheiser (born 1991)
- Jessica Wesson (born 1982)
- Nathan West (born 1978)
- Wil Wheaton (born 1972)
- Jill Whelan (born 1966)
- Julia Whelan (born 1984)
- Lisa Whelchel (born 1963)
- Johnny Whitaker (born 1959)
- Diamond White (born 1999)
- Jaleel White (born 1976)
- Mae Whitman (born 1988)
- Ryan Whitney (born 1998)
- Laura Slade Wiggins (born 1988)
- Josh Wiggins (born 1998)
- Violet Wilkey (1903–1976)
- Ashley C. Williams (born 1984)
- Barry Williams (born 1954)
- Keith L. Williams (born 2007)
- Kellie Shanygne Williams (born 1976)
- Michelle Williams (born 1980)
- R. J. Williams (born 1978)
- Tylen Jacob Williams (born 2001)
- Tyler James Williams (born 1992)
- Tyrel Jackson Williams (born 1997)
- Paul Willis (1901–1960)
- Rumer Willis (born 1988)
- Mara Wilson (born 1987)
- Camille Winbush (born 1990)
- Ariel Winter (born 1998)
- Jane Withers (1926–2021)
- Reese Witherspoon (born 1976)
- Alicia Witt (born 1975)
- Hillary Wolf (born 1977)
- Alex Wolff (born 1997)
- Nat Wolff (born 1994)
- Jason Woliner (born 1980)
- Anna May Wong (1905–1961)
- Elijah Wood (born 1981)
- Lana Wood (born 1946)
- Natalie Wood (1938–1981)
- Shailene Woodley (born 1991)
- Bill Woodson (1917–2017)
- Marc Worden (born 1976)
- Jimmy Workman (born 1980)
- Isaac Hempstead Wright (born 1999)
- Shahadi Wright Joseph (born 2005)
- Rhiannon Leigh Wryn (born 2000)
- Jamil Walker Smith (born 1982)
- Adam Wylie (born 1984)
- Sofia Wylie (born 2004)

== Y ==
- Hudson Yang (born 2003)
- Michael Yarmush (born 1982)
- Breanna Yde (born 2003)
- Jennie Yeamans (1862–1906)
- Anton Yelchin (1989–2016)
- Liu Yifei (born 1987)
- Morgan York (born 1993)
- Tina Yothers (born 1973)
- Emily Mae Young (born 1990)
- Lee Thompson Young (1984–2013)
- Loretta Young (1913–2000)

== Z ==
- Pia Zadora (born 1954)
- Sofie Zamchick (born 1994)
- Billy Zane (born 1966)
- Zendaya (born 1996)
- Mackenzie Ziegler (born 2004)
- Maddie Ziegler (born 2002)
- Madeline Zima (born 1985)
- Vanessa Zima (born 1986)
- Yvonne Zima (born 1989)
- Joey Zimmerman (born 1989)
- Cozi Zuehlsdorff (born 1998)

== See also ==
- List of current American child actors
