= St. Pius X Catholic High School (Chamblee, Georgia) =

Private Catholic high school in Atlanta, Georgia, United States

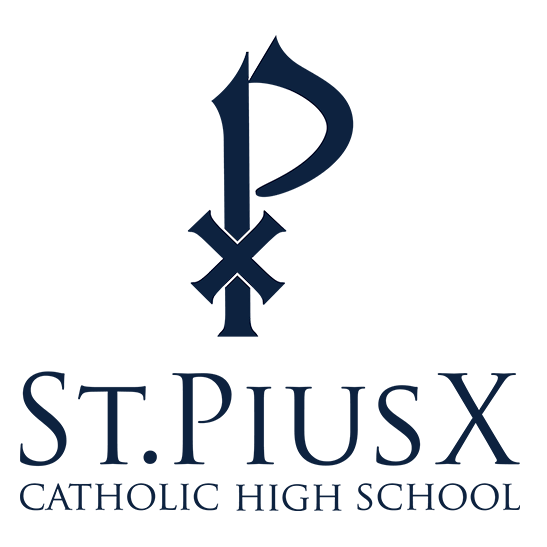

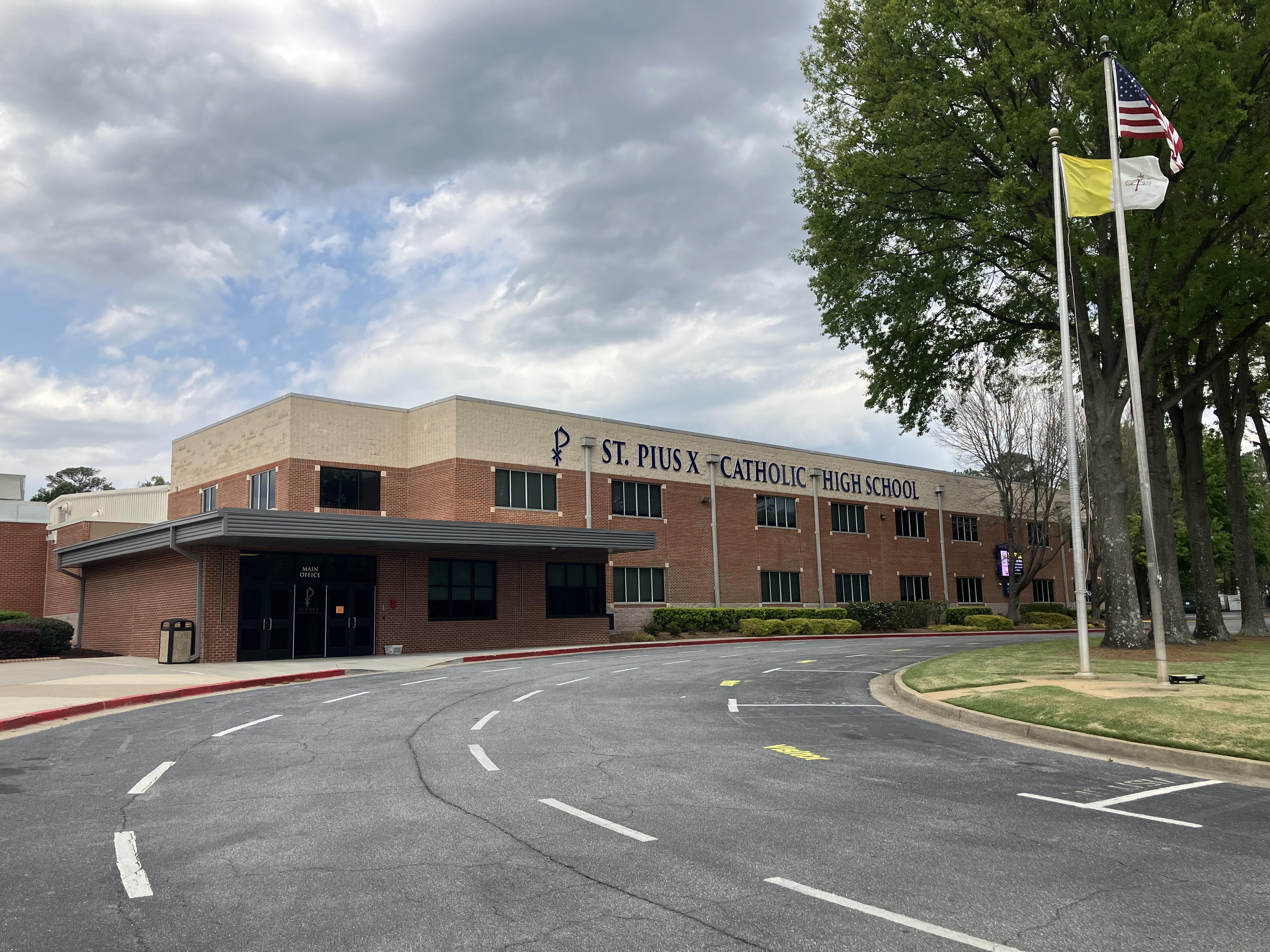
- Front of school (April 2025)

Location
- 2674 Johnson Road NE; Atlanta, DeKalb County, Georgia 30345; United States; 33°51′51″N 84°17′33″W

Information
- Type: Private, coeducational
- Motto: Domini Sumus ("We are the Lord's")
- Religious affiliation: Catholic
- Established: 1958
- Superintendent: Patty Childs
- President: Aaron Parr
- Principal: Kristin Kramer
- Chaplain: Father Robbie Cotta
- Teaching staff: 98
- Grades: 9–12
- Enrollment: 956 (2026–2027)
- Student to teacher ratio: 10.2
- Classrooms: 62
- Campus: Suburban
- Campus size: 37.8 acres
- Colors: White, gold, blue
- Mascot: Golden Lion
- Team name: Golden Lions
- Rival: Blessed Trinity; Marist
- Accreditation: Southern Association of Colleges and Schools
- Newspaper: Golden Lines
- Yearbook: Golden Echoes
- Tuition: $19,900 (Catholic), $21,900 Non-Catholic
- Graduates: 14,570
- Website: spx.org and spxgoldenlions.com

St. Pius X Catholic High School is a private Catholic high school in Atlanta, Georgia, United States. It was founded by the Archdiocese of Atlanta in 1958.

== Description ==
Annual tuition is $19,900 for active Catholics and $21,900 for non-active or non-Catholics. St. Pius X makes available a limited amount of financial aid to families in need via a work study program. The maximum amount of aid available per student is 75% of the active Catholic tuition rate.

== Athletics ==
St. Pius X currently has 25 main sports teams. St. Pius X fields 62 teams at junior varsity and varsity levels in most sports, with the larger programs fielding freshman teams. The school's colors are navy blue and Vegas gold, and their nickname is the Golden Lions. St. Pius X has won six Regions Director's Cups, including in 2018–19, which ended the 19-year streak of Marist at the AAAA level.

As of the 2025–26 season

Type	Competition	State titles	Season(s)
Boys' sports	Baseball	0	
Boys' sports	Basketball	1	2026
Boys' sports	Cross Country	12	1993, 1994, 1996, 2010, 2011, 2012, 2013, 2014, 2016, 2018, 2019, 2020
Boys' sports	Football	1	1968
Boys' sports	Golf	2	2019, 2021
Boys' sports	Lacrosse	0	
Boys' sports	Soccer	12	1987, 1995, 1996, 1997, 1999, 2001, 2009, 2011, 2013, 2014, 2015, 2016
Boys' sports	Swimming	4	2014, 2017, 2018, 2019
Boys' sports	Wrestling	0	
Boys' sports	Tennis	4	1999, 2001, 2004, 2014
Boys' sports	Track & Field	5	2006, 2013, 2014, 2018, 2019
Girls' sports	Competitive Cheerleading	0	
Girls' sports	Cross Country	6	1997, 2009, 2012, 2019, 2020, 2021
Girls' sports	Flag Football	0	
Girls' sports	Golf	0	
Girls' sports	Lacrosse	0	
Girls' sports	Soccer	12	1998, 2001, 2002, 2009, 2010, 2011, 2013, 2014, 2015, 2016, 2017, 2019
Girls' sports	Softball	1	1995
Girls' sports	Swimming	1	2022
Girls' sports	Tennis	3	1981, 2009, 2012
Girls' sports	Track & Field	1	2006
Girls' sports	Volleyball	3	2013, 2018, 2021
Girls' sports	Basketball	5	2004, 2006, 2007, 2013, 2014

Key:

School Boys' Record
School Girls' Record

=== Fall sports ===
The football program won one state title in 1968, and have been state runners-up three times, in 1965, 2012, and 2014. The team has made the state playoffs in 19 of the past 20 seasons.

The boys' cross country team has won 12 state titles, including nine since 2010. Both the boys' and girls' teams won the AAAA state title in 2019 and were All-Class State champions in 2020.

The volleyball team has won three state championships, in 2013, 2018, and 2021 and has five state runners-up finishes.

The softball team won the state title in 1995 and were runners-up in 1998.

The Golden Lions have a competition cheer squad in addition to the spirit squads.

=== Winter sports ===
Both boys' and girls' swimming team's home pool is the Dynamo Swim Center just down the street from campus. Boys' swimming has claimed four state titles, including three straight in 2017–2019. The girls' swim team has four state runners-up finishes, in 2009, 2015, 2019, and 2021, and one state title in 2022.

Both basketball teams won the region title in 2020. The boys' team has three state runners-up finishes in 1992, 2017, and 2018. The girls' team has won five state championships, in 2004, 2006, 2007, 2013, and 2014.

The wrestling program had five wrestlers place at the state tournament in 2020.

The dance team performs at halftime during basketball games and practices during the week.

=== Spring sports ===
The boys' soccer team produced US World Cup player Ricardo Clark, who once played for Eintracht Frankfurt in addition to the U.S. National Team, and Andrew Wolverton, who was a part of the 2011 FAB 50 National Championship team. The men's program has 12 state titles including a run of four straight from 2013 to 2016, and were named National Champions in 2011 and 2015

The girls' soccer team has won twelve state crowns and won five straight from 2013 to 2017 and were named National Champions in 2009.

Boys' golf won its first state championship in 2019, and has been runners-up three times. The girls' golf team finished in the top 10 at the state championships in 2019.

Baseball has advanced to the state semifinals in 2013 and in 2021.

Boys' track & field has five state titles, including back-to-back championships in 2018 and 2019. Girls' track & field won a state crown in 2006 and has finished in second place seven times.

The tennis programs have multiple state titles. The boys' program has four state championships and eight runners-up, and the girls' program has three state titles and nine runners-up finishes.

== Notable alumni ==
- Annie Anton, member of the President's Commission on Enhancing National Cybersecurity
- Richard Armitage, deputy secretary of state under George W. Bush
- Gunnar Bentz, Olympic gold medalist swimmer, 2016 Summer Olympics
- Kelley Cain, former basketball player, Connecticut Sun (WNBA)
- Violet Chachki, winner of RuPaul's Drag Race Season 7
- Ricardo Clark, former midfielder, Eintracht Frankfurt, Houston Dynamo and United States men's national soccer team
- Kevin Cone, former wide receiver, Winnipeg Blue Bombers
- Asia Durr, basketball player, Atlanta Dream (WNBA)
- Jason Eck, head football coach, University of New Mexico
- Crosby Fitzgerald, actress, Little House on the Prairie
- Leah Hardeman, professional volleyball player, Grand Rapids Rise
- Daniel Haugh, discus thrower and hammer thrower, 2020 Summer Olympics and 2024 Summer Olympics
- Jonathan Kerner, former basketball player, Orlando Magic
- Renee Lyles, soccer player, Portland Thorns FC (National Women's Soccer League)
- Jimmy Maurer, former goalkeeper, FC Dallas
- Alexa Newfield, former soccer player, Utah Royals FC (National Women's Soccer League)
- Nick Rogers, former linebacker, Minnesota Vikings
- Mike Schrage, assistant basketball coach, Duke University
- Chandler Simpson, baseball outfielder, Tampa Bay Rays, member of the United States team in 2024 WBSC Premier12
- Jack Tchienchou, college football safety for the Tulane Green Wave
- Kate Ward, Deaflympics soccer gold medalist
- Andrew Wolverton, goalkeeper, LA Galaxy

== See also ==
- National Catholic Educational Association
