= Sons of Liberty (film) =

1939 film

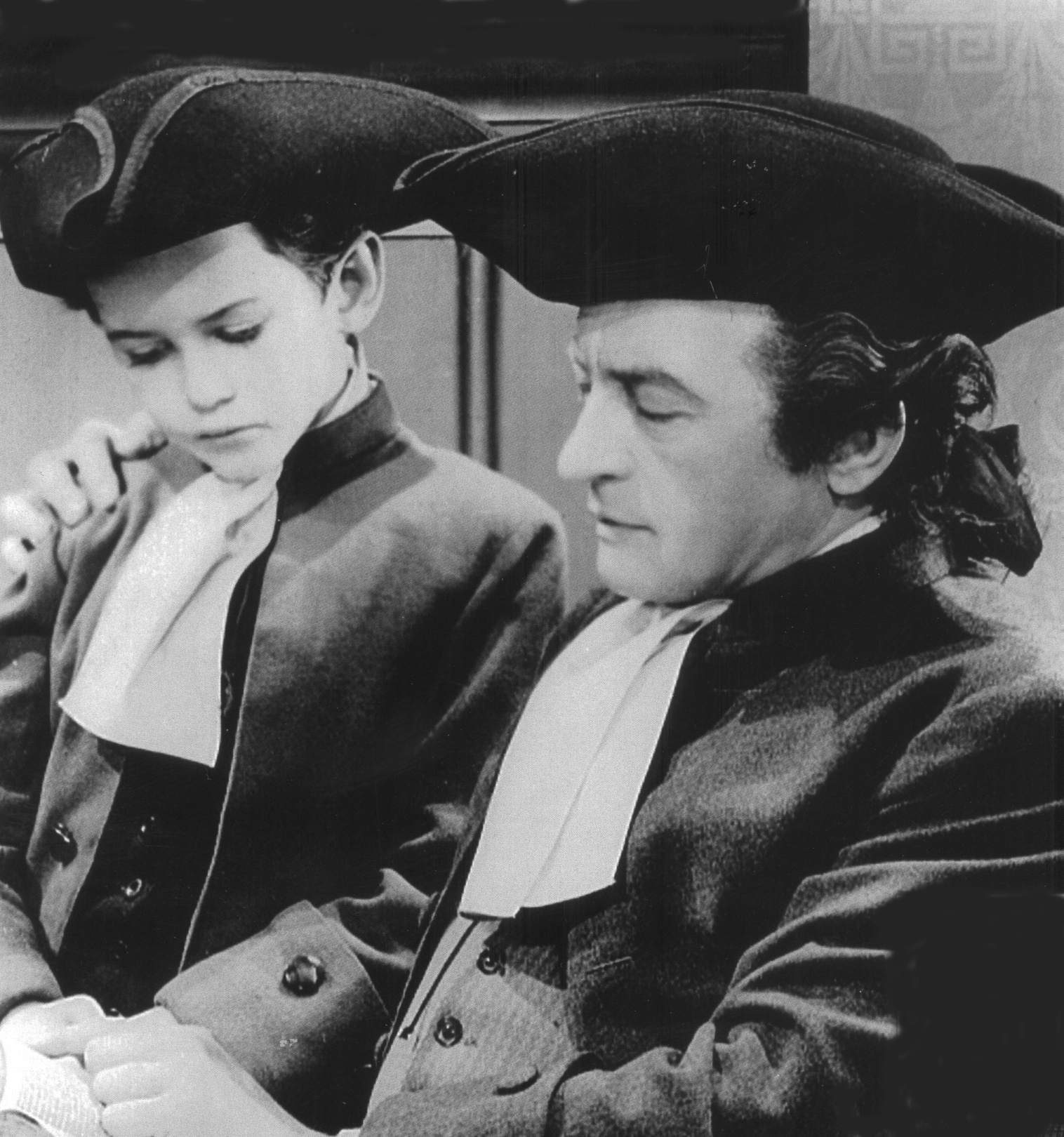
- Ernie Weckbaugh and Claude Rains
- Directed by: Michael Curtiz
- Written by: Crane Wilbur
- Produced by: Gordon Hollingshead
- Starring: Claude Rains; Gale Sondergaard
- Narrated by: Charles Frederick Lindsley
- Cinematography: Sol Polito; Ray Rennahan
- Edited by: Thomas Pratt
- Music by: Howard Jackson
- Production company: Warner Bros.
- Distributed by: Warner Bros.
- Release date: May 20, 1939
- Running time: 20 minutes
- Country: United States
- Language: English

Sons of Liberty is a 1939 American short drama film directed by Michael Curtiz, which tells the story of Haym Solomon. At the 12th Academy Awards, held in 1940, it won an Academy Award for Best Short Subject (Two-Reel).

== Plot ==
Leigh Ehlers Telotte wrote in George Washington on Screen, "Michael Curtiz's Sons of Liberty (1939) [stars] Claude Rains as Haym Salomon, an American patriot and a financier of the Revolution. In this 20-minute biopic of Salomon's life, he joins the Sons of Liberty in 1776, acts as a spy for General Washington (Montagu Love), meets Nathan Hale just before his execution, raises funds to support the Revolution, and dies in poverty at age 44."

== Cast ==
- Claude Rains as Haym Salomon
- Gale Sondergaard as Rachel Salomon
- Donald Crisp as Alexander McDougall
- Montagu Love as George Washington
- Henry O'Neill as Member of Continental Congress
- James Stephenson as Colonel Tillman
- Harry Cording as Arresting Trooper (uncredited)
- Jack Mower as Messenger (uncredited)
- Moroni Olsen as Robert Morris (uncredited)
- Larry Williams as Nathan Hale (uncredited)

== See also ==
- Sons of Liberty
- List of films about the American Revolution
- List of television series and miniseries about the American Revolution
