= The Twisted Tale of Amanda Knox =

American television series

- Promotional poster
- Genre: Biographical drama True crime
- Created by: K.J. Steinberg
- Based on: Waiting to Be Heard: A Memoir by Amanda Knox
- Starring: Grace Van Patten; Sharon Horgan; Francesco Acquaroli; Giuseppe De Domenico; John Hoogenakker; Stefano Cassetti; Roberta Mattei
- Composer: Jeff Russo
- Country of origin: United States
- Original languages: English; Italian
- No. of episodes: 8

Production
- Executive producers: K.J. Steinberg; Monica Lewinsky; Warren Littlefield; Kathy Ciric; Amanda Knox; Christopher Robinson; Lisa Harrison; Ann Johnson; Michael Uppendahl; Mary Laws; Graham Littlefield
- Cinematography: Simon Hawken; Colin Watkinson; Bella Gonzales
- Editors: Lara Johnston; Nicholas Wong; Lauren Brandon
- Production companies: Good Talk Productions; The Littlefield Company; Alt Ending Productions; 20th Television

Original release
- Network: Hulu
- Release: August 20 – October 1, 2025

The Twisted Tale of Amanda Knox is an American true crime biographical drama miniseries created by K.J. Steinberg. It is based on the true story of Amanda Knox and her wrongful conviction in the murder of Meredith Kercher. It stars Grace Van Patten as Knox, as well as Sharon Horgan, Francesco Acquaroli, Giuseppe De Domenico, John Hoogenakker, and Roberta Mattei. The eight-episode series premiered on Hulu on August 20, 2025.

== Premise ==
Amanda Knox arrives in Italy for her study abroad only to be wrongfully imprisoned for murder weeks later. The series charts her relentless fight to prove her innocence and reclaim her freedom, and examines why authorities and the world stood so firmly in judgment.

== Cast ==
=== Main ===
- Grace Van Patten as Amanda Knox
- Sharon Horgan as Edda Mellas
- Francesco Acquaroli as Giuliano Mignini
- Giuseppe De Domenico as Raffaele Sollecito
- John Hoogenakker as Curt Knox
- Roberta Mattei as Valentina Greco
- Stefano Cassetti as Carlo Dalla Vedova

=== Recurring ===
- Joe Lanza as Chris Mellas
- Alfredo Pea as Don Saulo Scarabattoli
- Corinna Bennati Lo Castro as Ginevra Ferrari
- Anna Van Patten as Deanna Knox
- Rhianne Barreto as Meredith Kercher
- Vincenzo Zampa as Tommaso Conti
- Lorenzo Cingolani as Luca Altieri
- Evelyn Famà as Lucrezia Ippolito
- Angelo Libri as Luca Lilli
- Fabio Salerno as Bruno Ricci
- Crosby Fitzgerald as Madison
- Uta Dunz as Oma
- Rebecca Hazlewood as Stephanie Kercher
- Rebecca Wisocky as Cecilia
- Antonio Rampino as Francesco Sollecito

== Episodes ==
No.	Title	Directed by	Written by	Original release date
1	"Amanda"	Michael Uppendahl	K. J. Steinberg	August 20, 2025
American college student Amanda Knox embarks on her study abroad trip in Italy. The morning before Amanda is supposed to leave on a romantic excursion with her new Italian boyfriend, Raffaele Sollecito, things take a sinister turn.
2	"Ci vediamo più tardi"	Michael Uppendahl	K. J. Steinberg	August 20, 2025
Under mounting pressure, the police try to break Amanda and Raffaele, while Edda races to reunite with her daughter.
3	"The Guardian of Perugia"	Cate Shortland	Sam Rubinek & Nate Burke	August 27, 2025
As Amanda, Raffaele, and Patrick Lumumba enter prison, Giuliano Mignini, their prosecutor, continues to build his case against them while the media’s reporting turns Amanda into a monster.
4	"All You Need Is Love"	Cate Shortland	Wes Taylor	September 3, 2025
A wrench is thrown in Mignini’s case and the search for a new suspect, Rudy Guede, begins. As the highly anticipated trial unfolds, Amanda’s choices continue to be scrutinized by the press.
5	"Mr. Nobody"	Natalia Leite	Mary Laws	September 10, 2025
As the trial continues and Raffaele’s days in prison turn to months and years, his heartbreaking history unfolds. Raffaele is urged to separate his defense from Amanda’s before the verdict is delivered.
6	"Colpevole"	Natalia Leite	Sofya Levitsky-Weitz	September 17, 2025
After the verdict, Amanda falls into a depression, resigning herself to making the best of life in prison. As her appeal approaches and new facts come to light, Amanda decides she will not make the same mistakes that she made in her first trial.
7	"U were there"	Quyen Tran	Teleplay by : Rebekah Barnett & Mary Laws; Story by : Rebekah Barnett	September 24, 2025
Amanda struggles to readjust to life back home in Seattle. Her acquittal is overturned by the Supreme Court of Cassation and another retrial finds her and Sollecito guilty again. A final appeal to the Supreme Court of Cassation conclusively acquits them, which rules that the case was completely without foundation.
8	"Libertà"	Quyen Tran	K. J. Steinberg & Amanda Knox	October 1, 2025
Amanda returns to Italy to meet with Giuliano and Raffaele.

== Production ==
=== Development ===
In March 2024, it was reported that Hulu had ordered a limited series about Amanda Knox. Produced by 20th Television and The Littlefield Company, with series creator K.J. Steinberg, Warren Littlefield, Lisa Harrison, Ann Johnson, Graham Littlefield of The Littlefield Company, Monica Lewinsky, Knox and Christopher Robinson serving as executive producers. By September 2024, the series was being referred to by the title of Amanda, and the working title Blue Moon. The series was retitled to The Twisted Tale of Amanda Knox along with the release of the trailer in July 2025.

=== Casting ===
Upon the initial announcement, Margaret Qualley had signed on to portray Knox in the series and serve as an executive producer. Qualley had exited the project by April 2024 due to scheduling conflicts, and Grace Van Patten took over the role in June. In September 2024, Sharon Horgan joined the cast as Edda Mellas. John Hoogenakker, Francesco Acquaroli, Giuseppe De Domenico and Roberta Mattei were also added to the cast later that month. In March 2025, Rebecca Wisocky, Joe Lanza and Crosby Fitzgerald were cast in recurring roles as Knox's cellmate Cecilia, Knox's stepfather Chris Mellas and Knox's best friend Madison, respectively.

=== Filming ===
Principal photography was scheduled to begin in October 2024. By November 2024, the series began filming in the Italian city of Perugia.

== Release ==
The Twisted Tale of Amanda Knox premiered on Hulu with the first two episodes on August 20, 2025, with the following six episodes being released weekly. Internationally, the series was made available to stream on Disney+.

== Reception ==
=== Viewership ===
The Twisted Tale of Amanda Knox entered Hulu's "Top 15 Today" list—a daily ranking of the platform's most-watched titles—following its premiere on August 20. Two days after its debut, streaming analytics firm FlixPatrol, which monitors daily updated VOD charts and streaming ratings across the globe, reported that the series ranked No. 2 globally across Disney+ and Hulu. JustWatch, a guide to streaming content with access to data from more than 20 million users around the world, calculated that it was the second most-streamed series in the U.S. from August 18–31. The Twisted Tale of Amanda Knox remained on Hulu's "Top 15 Today" list from its debut on August 20 through October 3.

=== Critical response ===
On the review aggregator website Rotten Tomatoes, 71% of 28 critics' reviews are positive. Metacritic, which uses a weighted average, assigned a score of 59 out of 100, based on 17 critic reviews, indicating "mixed or average" reviews.

Robert Lloyd of Los Angeles Times stated that The Twisted Tale of Amanda Knox dramatizes the sensational case surrounding Amanda Knox with a mix of tension, style, and uneven storytelling. He found that the series captures the extreme pressures Knox faced, from prolonged interrogations and false confessions to public scrutiny and media sensationalism, while also highlighting the broader miscarriage of justice. Lloyd appreciated the performances, particularly Grace Van Patten and Francesco Acquaroli, noting how they brought depth and humanity to their roles. He praised the series' ambitious direction and inventive visual techniques, though he found some stylistic choices—like abrupt tonal shifts and varied narrative approaches—occasionally distracting.

Lucy Mangan of The Guardian said that The Twisted Tale of Amanda Knox effectively traces Knox's journey from her arrest to eventual exoneration, illustrating how prejudices, media sensationalism, and prosecutorial missteps combined to create a miscarriage of justice. She appreciated the show's propulsive narrative and efforts to humanize certain figures, such as prosecutor Giuliano Mignini. Mangan praised Grace Van Patten's performance, highlighting her ability to capture the character's naivety, overconfidence, and emotional turmoil across both English and Italian dialogue. Although she noted some unevenness in the script and stylistic choices—particularly the mannered, Wes Anderson-lite openings—Mangan found that the series succeeds in conveying the intensity and human cost of Knox's ordeal.

=== Accolades ===
The Twisted Tale of Amanda Knox received a nomination for the Maxwell Weinberg Award for Television at the 2026 ICG Publicists Awards.
