= Kindergarten: The Musical =

American animated television series

- Genre: Comedy; Musical; Educational
- Created by: Michelle Lewis; Charlton Pettus
- Voices of: Andrea Rosa Guzman; Zander Chin; Leah Newman; Shyam Balasubramanian; Tandi Fomukong; Alice Halsey; Kailen Jude; Randy Perrine; Gina Torres
- Opening theme: "Kindergarten: The Musical" performed by Eva Noblezada
- Ending theme: "Kindergarten: The Musical" (instrumental)
- Composer: Vidjay Beerepoot
- Country of origin: United States
- Original language: English
- No. of seasons: 1
- No. of episodes: 25 (50 segments)

Production
- Executive producers: Tom Warburton; Michelle Lewis; Kay Hanley; Charlton Pettus; Dan Petty; Laurie Israel; Chris Hamilton
- Producer: Greg Chalekian
- Running time: 22 minutes (11 minutes per segment)
- Production company: Oddbot Animation

Original release
- Network: Disney Jr.
- Release: September 3, 2024 – May 23, 2025

Kindergarten: The Musical is an American animated children's television series created by Michelle Lewis and Charlton Pettus that aired on Disney Jr. from September 3, 2024 to May 23, 2025. The series is produced by Oddbot Animation, with animation services provided by M2 Animation. The series centers on Berti and her friends starting kindergarten.

== Synopsis ==
The series follows the adventures of Berti Benavente, a 5-year-old girl who starts kindergarten at Porter Elementary School and discovers the highs and lows of school, along with her classmates and teacher Ms. Moreno. Each episode is presented in the style of a Broadway musical, with the kids singing and dancing as they learn new things. One song per episode features a shift from CGI animation to 2D Flash animation, featuring a music video based on what Berti and her classmates have learned.

== Characters ==
=== Main ===
- Berti Benavente (voiced by Andrea Rosa Guzman)
- Radish Rizal (voiced by Zander Chin)
- Rose (voiced by Leah Newman)
- Tej (voiced by Shyam Balasubramanian)
- Abigail Wells (voiced by Tandi Fomukong)
- Kat and Ellie (both voiced by Alice Halsey)
- Kenji (voiced by Kailen Jude)
- Jamil (voiced by Randy Perrine)
- Ms. Sonya Moreno (voiced by Gina Torres)

=== Recurring ===
- Mr. Benavente (voiced by Aloe Blacc)
- Ms. Alvarez (voiced by Ana Isabelle)
- Val Rizal (voiced by Vincent Rodriguez III)
- Carly (voiced by Lena Josephine Marano)

=== Guest ===
- Hedgehog Holmes (voiced by Leona Lewis)

== Episodes ==
No.	Title	Directed by	Written by	Storyboarded by	Original release date	Prod. code
1	"There's No Place Like Kindergarten"	Chong Suk Lee	Laurie Israel	Sam J. Irizarry & Joe Haider	September 3, 2024	101
1	"We're Off to Get a Sticker"	Guy Moore	Laurie Israel	Damien Luis Lopez	September 3, 2024	101
2	"One Singular Self-Portrait"	Chong Suk Lee	Dara Frazier & Laurie Israel	Sam J. Irizarry	September 4, 2024	102
2	"Don't Cry for Me Kindergarten"	Guy Moore	Damien Luis Lopez & Ellie Guzman	Damien Luis Lopez	September 4, 2024	102
3	"Little Job of Horrors"	Guy Moore	Laurie Israel	Rebecca Snowden	September 5, 2024 (Note: This episode was first released on Disney+ on September 4, 2024.)	103
3	"Bye Bye Albie"	Chong Suk Lee	Laurie Israel	Areli Quinonez	September 5, 2024	103
4	"Shoeloose"	Chong Suk Lee	Amanda Gotera	Angela Choi & Joe Haider	September 6, 2024	104
4	"If I Only Had a Scarf"	Guy Moore	Dara Frazier	Hilary Paige Taylor	September 6, 2024	104
5	"Bunny Girl"	Chong Suk Lee	Charlton Pettus	Areli Quinonez & Joe Haider	September 13, 2024	107
5	"Give My Regards to Backdrops"	Nora M. Johnson	Matt Price	Rebecca Snowden	September 13, 2024	107
6	"Twin the Heights"	Chong Suk Lee	Matt Price	Angela Choi & Bill Breneisen	September 20, 2024	109
6	"Everything's Coming Up Jamil"	Nora M. Johnson	David Brandyn	Hilary Paige Taylor & Lauren Kreiger	September 20, 2024	109
7	"The Witch and I"	Nora M. Johnson	Amanda Gotera	Lauren Kreiger & Sam Marin	October 4, 2024	117
7	"Berti and the Beast"	Matt Danner	Ivory Floyd	Sam J. Irizarry & Cindy Quach	October 4, 2024	117
8	"Phantom of the Trumpet"	Chong Suk Lee	Peter Chen	Angela Choi & Stephen B. Jones	October 11, 2024	106
8	"Food Glorious Food Fair"	Nora M. Johnson & Guy Moore	Venessa M. Diaz	Hilary Paige Taylor	October 11, 2024	106
9	"All or Muffin"	Chong Suk Lee	Peter Chen	Areli Quinonez & Bill Breneisen	October 18, 2024	110
9	"Bring in 'da Cake, Bring in 'da Fun"	Nora M. Johnson	Venessa M. Diaz	Rebecca Snowden & Stephen B. Jones	October 18, 2024	110
10	"Don't Grow for Me"	Chong Suk Lee	Amanda Gotera	Sam J. Irizarry & Bill Breneisen	October 25, 2024	111
10	"You Can't Stop the Beads"	Nora M. Johnson	David Brandyn	Lauren Kreiger & Stephen B. Jones	October 25, 2024	111
11	"Meet Me in Santo Domingo"	Nora M. Johnson	Peter Chen	Hilary Paige Taylor & Sam Marin	November 15, 2024 (Note: This episode was first released on Disney+ on November 6, 2024.)	118
11	"Some Enchanted Second Grader"	Matt Danner	Venessa M. Diaz	Angela Choi & Cindy Quach	November 15, 2024	118
12	"Do You Hear the Students Sing?"	Matt Danner & Chong Suk Lee	David Brandyn	Sam J. Irizarry & Kelsey Norden	November 22, 2024	114
12	"Hello, Dino Dolly!"	Nora M. Johnson	David Murto	Lauren Kreiger & Stephen B. Jones	November 22, 2024	114
13	"Squish in Boots"	Matt Danner & Chong Suk Lee	Ivory Floyd	Areli Quinonez & Crystal Kan	November 29, 2024	113
13	"Take Me or Leaf Me"	Nora M. Johnson	Peter Chen	Rebecca Snowden & Stephen B. Jones	November 29, 2024	113
14	"A Winter's Walrus"	Matt Danner	Amanda Gotera	Angela Choi & Cindy Quach	December 5, 2024	120
14	"One Holiday More"	Nora M. Johnson	Peter Chen	Hilary Paige Taylor & Sam Marin	December 5, 2024	120
15	"A Star is Drawn"	Nora M. Johnson	David Brandyn	Rebecca Snowden, Stephen B. Jones & Sam Marin	January 10, 2025	116
15	"My Tooth Fairy Lady"	Matt Danner & Chong Suk Lee	Peter Chen	Areli Quinonez & Cindy Quach	January 10, 2025	116
16	"Berti and the Amazing Candy-Coated Cottage"	Matt Danner	Ivory Floyd	Areli Quinonez & Cindy Quach	February 5, 2025	122
16	"Beet Juice"	Nora M. Johnson	David Murto	Rebecca Snowden & Sam Marin	February 5, 2025	122
17	"Choosies"	Nora M. Johnson	Ivory Floyd	Rebecca Snowden & Sam Marin	February 14, 2025 (Note: This episode was first released on Disney+ on February 5, 2025.)	112
17	"When You Wish Upon a Rose"	Matt Danner	Amanda Gotera	Areli Quinonez & Cindy Quach	February 14, 2025	112
18	"All That Math"	Matt Danner & Chong Suk Lee	Amanda Gotera	Angela Choi & Cindy Quach	February 21, 2025	115
18	"Don't Rain on My Field Day"	Nora M. Johnson	Venessa M. Diaz	Hilary Taylor & Sam Marin	February 21, 2025	115
19	"You're a Good Teacher, Ms. Moreno"	Matt Danner	David Brandyn	Sam J. Irizarry & Cindy Quach	March 7, 2025	121
19	"Piñata With the Fringe on Top"	Nora M. Johnson	Venessa M. Diaz	Lauren Krieger & Sam Marin	March 7, 2025	121
20	"Gotta Go!"	Chong Suk Lee	Jessica Leventhal	Rebecca Snowden	March 21, 2025	105
20	"Feel Ev'ry Feeling"	Guy Moore	David Brandyn	Areli Quinonez	March 21, 2025	105
21	"Take Me Out to the Tee-Ball Game"	Chong Suk Lee	Matt Price	Sam J Irizarry & Joe Haidar	April 4, 2025	125
21	"The Sun'll Come Out"	Nora M. Johnson	Amanda Gotera	Stephen B. Jones & Crystal Kan	April 4, 2025	125
22	"Oh, What a Beautiful Flower"	Matt Danner	Ivory Floyd	Sam J. Irizarry & Cindy Quach	April 18, 2025 (Note: This episode was first released on Disney+ on April 4, 2025.)	123
22	"Stink, Stink...Boom!"	Nora M. Johnson	David Brandyn	Lauren Krieger & Sam Marin	April 18, 2025	123
23	"It's Only a Paper Crane"	Matt Danner	Peter Chen	Angela Choi & Lauren Krieger	May 2, 2025	119
23	"If I Were a Princess"	Nora Johnson	Vanessa M. Diaz	Hilary Paige Taylor, Angela Choi, & Sam Marin	May 2, 2025	119
24	"Mami Mia"	Chong Suk Lee	Vanessa M. Diaz	Angela Choi & Charlotte Vevers	May 16, 2025	124
24	"Beach Blanket Berti"	Nora M. Johnson	Ivory Floyd	Hilary Paige Taylor & Stephen B. Jones	May 16, 2025	124
25	"Somewhere Over the Ocean"	Matt Danner	Amanda Gotera	Areli Quinonez	May 23, 2025	108
25	"It's the Hard-Book Life"	Nora M. Johnson	Ivory Floyd	Rebecca Snowden & Sam Marin	May 23, 2025	108

== Production ==
On April 29, 2022, during the Disney Jr. Fun Fest event, it was announced that Michelle Lewis and Charlton Pettus' preschool series Kindergarten: The Musical had been green-lit for Disney Jr. Lewis and Pettus executive producer alongside Tom Warburton, Kay Hanley and Dan Petty, with Laurie Israel serving as co-producer/story editor. The series is produced by Oddbot Entertainment in association with Disney Jr. Warburton, Guy Moore (3D) and Mallory Coronado (2D) serve as the series' supervising directors. Eva Noblezada helms the main title. The main cast was announced on August 5, 2024. On December 24, 2025, Michelle Lewis (the co-creator of the series) confirmed that the series had been cancelled after one season for undisclosed reasons.

== Release ==
Kindergarten: The Musical premiered in the United States on Disney Jr. on September 3, 2024. The first batch of ten episodes was made available for streaming on Disney+ starting September 4, 2024.

== Reception ==
Ashley Moulton of Common Sense Media rated Kindergarten four out of five stars and stated the series is a great pick for younger kids, praising its positive educational value and social-emotional lessons. She found the show's diverse representation of characters, with Berti being a Puerto Rican girl and classmates from various backgrounds, to be a highlight, stating that it subtly acknowledges cultural diversity without overtly discussing identities. Moulton appreciated the absence of stereotypical gender roles, noting that the characters don’t adhere to gendered interests. She appreciated the series' focus on kindness, problem-solving, and the excitement of learning, highlighting the positive role models that Berti and her friends represent. BELatina complimented Kindergarten for highlighting Puerto Rican and Dominican heritage. They found that the focus on Dominican culture, particularly in an episode where Berti visits her father's hometown of Santo Domingo, beautifully showcased the pride and joy of reconnecting with one's roots. BELatina said that the show provides young Latino viewers with an authentic reflection of their identities, amplifying their stories and validating their experiences. They appreciated how the show blends Broadway-style music with lessons about emotional expression, celebrating the complexities of Latino culture in a fun, engaging way.
