= Joe Pickett (TV series) =

2021 American Western crime-drama television series

- Genre: Crime drama; Neo-Western
- Based on: Joe Pickett by C. J. Box
- Directed by: John Erick Dowdle; Drew Dowdle
- Starring: Michael Dorman; Julianna Guill; Sharon Lawrence; Paul Sparks; Mustafa Speaks; Skywalker Hughes; Kamryn Pliva; David Alan Grier; Chad Rook; Aadila Dosani; Keean Johnson; Vivienne Guynn
- Composer: The Newton Brothers
- Country of origin: United States
- No. of seasons: 2
- No. of episodes: 20

Production
- Executive producers: John Erick Dowdle; Drew Dowdle; C. J. Box; Lucy Fisher; Douglas Wick; Katherine Pope; Liz Varner
- Producer: Linda Rogers-Ambury
- Production location: Canada
- Running time: 42–59 minutes
- Production companies: Red Wagon Entertainment; Brothers Dowdle Productions; Paramount Television Studios

Original release
- Network: Spectrum
- Release: December 6 – December 27, 2021
- Network: Paramount+
- Release: June 4 – July 30, 2023

Joe Pickett is an American neo-Western crime drama television series based on characters created by novelist C.J. Box. The series was produced by Paramount Television Studios and was initially released on Spectrum Originals in 2021, and then on Paramount+. The series stars Michael Dorman, Julianna Guill, Sharon Lawrence, Paul Sparks, Mustafa Speaks, and David Alan Grier.

The first season premiered on December 6, 2021, and consisted of ten episodes. In February 2022, the series was renewed for a second season which premiered on June 4, 2023, on Paramount+. In October 2023, the series was canceled after two seasons.

== Synopsis ==
The series follows the life of Joe Pickett, a game warden who moves with his wife Marybeth and their daughters to Saddlestring, Wyoming, to oversee the wilderness surrounding Yellowstone National Park, taking over for Vern Dunnegan. Joe soon discovers the body of poacher Ote Keeley in his backyard, uncovering a conspiracy involving the influential Scarlett family, Vern, and his friend Wacey Hedeman, who has invested in land for a profitable pipeline deal. Sightings of a supposedly extinct species (a fictional version of black-footed ferret) jeopardize their scheme, leading them to drastic measures, forcing Joe to protect both his family and the wildlife he's sworn to preserve.

== Cast and characters ==
=== Main ===
- Michael Dorman as Joe Pickett, a dedicated game warden who moves with his family to Saddlestring, Wyoming. He soon discovers that there is more to his job than simply dealing with illegal hunting or violating open season rules.
  - Zebastin Borjeau (recurring season 1) and Azriel Dalman (guest season 2) as young Joe Pickett
- Julianna Guill as Marybeth Pickett, Joe's former-lawyer wife and mother of their daughters Sheridan and Lucy
- Sharon Lawrence as Missy Vankeuren, Marybeth's materialistic mother, who moves in with the Picketts after her fiancé is incarcerated
- Paul Sparks as Wacey Hedeman (season 1), a game warden in the adjacent district to Twelve Sleep County who seeks to run for Sheriff. He secretly assists an oil pipeline company in illegally ridding the area of a critically endangered species of weasel.
- Mustafa Speaks as Nate Romanowski, a skilled survivalist, falconer, and former operative in the Mark V mercenary company
- Skywalker Hughes as Sheridan Pickett, Joe and Marybeth's older daughter
- Kamryn Pliva as Lucy Pickett, Joe and Marybeth's younger daughter
- David Alan Grier as Vern Dunnegan, a well-respected former game warden and the unofficial mayor of Saddlestring
- Chad Rook as Deputy Kyle McLanahan (season 2; recurring season 1), an arrogant and ignorant deputy for the Twelve Sleep County Sheriff's Department
- Aadila Dosani as Deputy Cricket Ludlow (season 2; recurring season 1), an intelligent but inexperienced deputy for the Twelve Sleep County Sheriff's Department and Nate's love interest
- Keean Johnson as Luke Brueggeman (season 2), a trainee game warden working under Joe
- Vivienne Guynn as April Keeley (season 2; recurring season 1), Ote and Jeannie's daughter

=== Recurring ===
- Leah Gibson as Jeannie Keeley (season 1; guest season 2), Ote's pregnant wife and April's mother
- Cassie Dzienny as Sadie Pickett (season 1; guest season 2), Joe and Victor's mother
- Kyle Mac as George Pickett (season 1), Joe and Victor's drunken and abusive father
- Oliver Mandelcorn as Victor Pickett (season 1), Joe's younger brother
  - Joshua Morettin as young Victor Pickett (guest season 1)
- Jacqueline and Joyce Robbins as Violet and Vivian Bouvier (season 1), a pair of elderly twin sisters who run an emu ranch
- Patrick Gallagher as Sheriff Bud Barnum, the head of the Twelve Sleep County Sheriff's department, who is inexperienced with investigating violent crime, while harboring a dark secret
- Judith Buchan as Opal Scarlett (season 1; guest season 2), the matriarch of the Scarlett family and a wealthy rancher who is willing to go to extreme lengths to hold on to her family's legacy
- Evie Marsten as Julie Scarlett (season 1; guest season 2), Hank's daughter and Opal's granddaughter, who leads a clique of popular students that bully those stricken with poverty
- Brendan Fletcher as Arlen Scarlett (season 1; guest season 2), Opal's older son and enforcer
- Roger LeBlanc as Hank Scarlett, Opal's younger son and Julie's father, who is an experienced hunter and a founding member of the Bull Grove Hunting Club
- Rachel Colwell as Taylor Maldonado (season 1), a wildlife biologist from a local reservation, who owns an animal rescue centre
- Alex Breaux as Caleb and Camish Grimmengruber (season 2), a pair of twin poachers known as the Grim Brothers who illegally hunt together on "Bermuda Mountain". They are originally from the U.P., where the State seized their family's land under eminent domain.
- John Ralston as Derek Longbrake (season 2), a wealthy regular at the bar where Missy works
- Julianne Christie as Blaire Urman (season 2), Marybeth's boss and the wife of a well-known hunter from Saddlestring, Frank Urman, who was killed on Bermuda Mountain
- Cheryl De Luca as Alisha Whiteplume (season 2), the guidance counselor at Sheridan and Lucy's school
- Sean Wei Mah as Charlie Left Hand (season 2), a desperate father from the local reservation searching for his missing daughter
- T'áncháy Redvers as Marissa Left Hand (season 2), Charlie's missing daughter who sought to expose the Bull Grove Hunting Club for drugging and raping young girls during their hunting trips after becoming one of their victims
- Chris Gauthier as Randy Pope (season 2), Joe's new boss at the Wyoming Game and Fish Department and a prominent member of the Bull Grove Hunting Club
- Aaron Dean Eisenberg as Klamath Moore (season 2), the violent leader of the "Stop the Slaughter" animal rights movement
- Emily Alabi as Shenandoah Yellowcalf/ Shannon Moore (season 2), Klamath's wife, who is concerned at the lengths he is willing to go to grow their movement. She seeks revenge against the Bull Grove Hunting Club for raping her and ruining her basketball career.

=== Guest ===
- Ben Hollingworth as Ote Keeley (season 1), a troublesome and poverty-stricken poacher whose murder leads to a series of investigations in Saddlestring
- Malik Elassal as Calvin Mendes (season 1), one of Ote's fellow hunters
- Owen Crow Shoe as Kyle Lensegrav (season 1), another of Ote's hunting friends
- David Haysom as Clyde Lidgard (season 1), the local "town creep" who lives isolated outside Saddlestring
- Mark Bellamy as Mitch (season 1), an openly gay Saddlestring resident who keeps abreast of everyone in town
- Diego Diablo Del Mar as Oliver Lopez, the local taxidermist in Saddlestring
- David Cubitt as Jerry Kelmeckis (season 1), a former Mark V operative hired to assassinate Nate while posing as a U.S. Marshal
- Blair Young as Les Etbauer (season 1), Joe's former boss and supervisor for the Wyoming Game and Fish Department. The Governor later fires him for refusing to reinstate Pickett.
- Lochlyn Munro as Governor Budd, the Governor of Wyoming, who was previously busted by Joe for fishing without a license
- Jessica Zhang as Wendy (season 2), the receptionist at the Wyoming Game and Fish Department
- David Trimble as Terry Boulden (season 2), a celebrated hunter who was targeted by the "Stop the Slaughter" movement
- Josh Collins as Chris Urman (season 2), Blaire's nephew and the last person to see his uncle alive
- Patrick Garrow as Buck Lothar (season 2), the host of the Buck Talk radio show and a self-proclaimed "master tracker"
- Joel Jackshaw as Wally Conway (season 2), a hunter who claims to be the "best shot in Wyoming" and a prominent member of the Bull Grove Hunting Club
- Noah Dalton Danby as "Big" Merle Connor (season 2), a former Mark V operative and Nate's associate, who is also on the run
- Ryan Robbins as Robbie Jax (season 2), a former Mark V operative in hiding in South Dakota

== Episodes ==
=== Series overview ===
| Season | Episodes | Originally released | | |
| Season | Episodes | First released | Last released | Network |
|---|---|---|---|---|
| 1 | 10 | December 6, 2021 | December 27, 2021 | Spectrum Originals |
| 2 | 10 | June 4, 2023 | July 30, 2023 | Paramount+ |

=== Season 1 (2021) ===
| No. overall | No. in season | Title | Directed by | Teleplay by | Original release date |
|---|---|---|---|---|---|
| 1 | 1 | "Monster at the Gate" | John Erick Dowdle | John Erick Dowdle & Drew Dowdle | December 6, 2021 |
| 2 | 2 | "Circling Vultures" | John Erick Dowdle | John Erick Dowdle & Drew Dowdle | December 6, 2021 |
| 3 | 3 | "Joey, Get Your Gun" | Everardo Gout | Samir Mehta | December 6, 2021 |
| 4 | 4 | "A Conspiracy of Ravens" | Everardo Gout | Stacy Chbosky | December 13, 2021 |
| 5 | 5 | "Live and Look Like a Million" | Drew Dowdle | Samir Mehta | December 13, 2021 |
| 6 | 6 | "Shoot, Shovel and Shut Up" | Jennifer Morrison | Sarah Marie Masson | December 20, 2021 |
| 7 | 7 | "The Most Hated Man in 12 Sleeps" | Jennifer Morrison | John Erick Dowdle & Drew Dowdle | December 20, 2021 |
| 8 | 8 | "The Killing Fields" | Drew Dowdle | Stacy Chbosky | December 27, 2021 |
| 9 | 9 | "Endangered" | Drew Dowdle | Jada Nation | December 27, 2021 |
| 10 | 10 | "Open Season" | Drew Dowdle | John Erick Dowdle & Drew Dowdle | December 27, 2021 |

=== Season 2 (2023) ===
| No. overall | No. in season | Title | Directed by | Teleplay by | Original release date |
|---|---|---|---|---|---|
| 11 | 1 | "The Missing and the Dead" | Stephen Woolfenden | John Erick Dowdle | June 4, 2023 |
| 12 | 2 | "The Question Why" | Stephen Woolfenden | Stacy Chbosky | June 4, 2023 |
| 13 | 3 | "Stop the Slaughter!" | Blackhorse Lowe | Isaac Gomez | June 11, 2023 |
| 14 | 4 | "Buck Wild" | Blackhorse Lowe | Nelson Greaves | June 18, 2023 |
| 15 | 5 | "Heads Will Roll" | Drew Dowdle | Sarah Marie Masson | June 25, 2023 |
| 16 | 6 | "Ducks and Falcons" | Drew Dowdle | Diego D. Moreno | July 2, 2023 |
| 17 | 7 | "Fair Chase" | Janice Cooke | Alice Dennard | July 9, 2023 |
| 18 | 8 | "A Call For Help" | Janice Cooke | Stacy Chbosky | July 16, 2023 |
| 19 | 9 | "If This Is Goodbye" | Shana Stein | Nelson Greaves | July 23, 2023 |
| 20 | 10 | "The Third Way" | Shana Stein | John Erick Dowdle | July 30, 2023 |

== Production ==
=== Cast ===
In April 2021, it was announced that Michael Dorman would star in the title role whilst David Alan Grier, Julianna Guill, Sharon Lawrence, Mustafa Speaks, Paul Sparks, Skywalker Hughes, and Kamryn Pilva joined the cast as series regulars.

In June 2022, Vivienne Guynn, Chad Rook, and Aadila Dosani were promoted to series regulars for the second season. Keean Johnson also joined the cast as a series regular whilst Alex Breaux, Sean Wei Mah, John Ralston, Cheryl De Luca, Chris Gauthier, Emily Alabi, T'áncháy Redvers, and Aaron Dean Eisenberg were set to recur.

=== Development ===
In March 2021, Spectrum Originals ordered Joe Pickett straight to series and would be based on C.J. Box's series of novels of the same name. The first season was an adaptation of the first and third Joe Pickett novels, Open Season and Winterkill respectively. On October 31, 2023, the series was canceled after two seasons.

=== Filming ===
Although the series' setting is the rural town of Saddlestring, Wyoming, the series was filmed on location around Calgary, specifically the Cochrane area.

In July 2022, the second season started production in Okotoks, Alberta and High River, Alberta.

== Themes ==
Joe Pickett is part of a resurgence in the Western genre.

== Release ==
The series was initially a streaming exclusive for Spectrum, having launched in December 2021, during which time it became the most-watched series on the network. The first season was later added to Paramount+.

== Reception ==
On the review aggregator website Rotten Tomatoes, the first season has a 100% approval rating based on 5 critic reviews, and the second season has a 100% approval rating based on 5 critic reviews.

Joe Keller, writing a review for Decider.com, says "Joe Pickett has some unexpected humor among the darkness, and a title character that shows his weaknesses and baggage on his face, even to the people he's trying to help or arrest. It's a show that has a more realistic feel and flows a lot better than some of the shows we've seen in the Western genre of late."

TV Guide's Matt Roush writes, "I mean it as the highest compliment when I suggest that anyone who followed Longmire from cable to Netflix will find a kindred spirit here. From the early episodes, this also appears to be following the outlines of Box's disciplined storytelling more faithfully than the bizarrely baroque Big Sky."
