= Xander Cole =

American Osage actor (born 2003)

- Born: 23 December 2003 (age 22); Garland, Texas
- Occupation: Actor
- Years active: 2022–present
- Known for: Little House on the Prairie

Xander Cole Yarbrough Goodin is an American Osage actor. He is known for playin Little Puma on the Little House on the Prairie 2026 reboot. Xander is a member of the Osage nation from the WaXaKoLi district.

== Early life ==
Cole was born and raised in Garland, Texas, spending summers and holidays with family in Oklahoma. He has two brothers in Texas and three more siblings in Oklahoma. Cole has held a passion for acting since he was in middle school.

He signed up for the theater program, and by the time he started high school, he had already quit soccer to devote himself full-time to acting. Competing in Texas UIL OAP as a high schooler imbued him with a fervent appreciation for storytelling that has followed him into his professional career.

== Career ==
Xander moved to Oklahoma right after high school to pursue acting. While training at The Actor Factory in Norman, Oklahoma, he was part of multiple TV productions, short films and TV commercials before landing his major breakout role of Little Puma on the new version of Little House on the Prairie (2026). It was the second role he had taped for ever.

Xander Cole almost didn't send in his audition video for the role of Little Puma. He had just returned from visiting his family in Texas and might have given up on the audition altogether if his roommate, Maggie, hadn't helped him record the video. Fortunately, she did. Since the series premiered, viewers have embraced Little Puma as a standout character and are constantly posting content about him on social media.

In this new retelling of the original books written by Laura Ingalls Wilder the Ingalls are paralleled by an Osage family, the Mitchells, whose daughter Good Eagle, Little Puma's niece, befriends Laura Ingall.

This new version also planned on creating conversation and bringing awareness about Native Americans, specifically the Osage people, as their history and struggle was not treated with respect on both the books and first TV show adaption.

== Filmography ==
=== Film ===
Year	Title	Role	Notes
2024	You Can Take It With You	Jeremy	Lead role / Short Film
2025	Slash!	Iggy	Short Film
2026	The Knight of the Sorrowful Figure	Knight of the White Moon	Supporting role

=== Television ===
Year	Title	Role	Notes
2022	Fairwood	Teenage Stud	Day-Player
2023–2024	Web of Spider-Man	Ben Richardson/Young Father Lantham	2 Episodes / Executive Producer
2025	Spoken Gospel	Zechariah	Day-Player
2026	People of the West	Older Teddy	Supporting role
2026	Little House On The Prairie	Little Puma	Recurring role
