= I, Object =

Upcoming film by Andrew Niccol

- Directed by: Andrew Niccol
- Written by: Andrew Niccol
- Produced by: Chris Yurkovich; Craig Lyn; Alex Ordanis; Karl Urban; Timothy White; Daniel Bekerman; Polly Fryer; Andrew Niccol
- Starring: Bentley Storteboom; Anna Faris; Ethan Hawke; Jemaine Clement; Skywalker Hughes; Karl Urban
- Cinematography: Dave Garbett
- Edited by: Christopher Donaldson; Reginald Harkema
- Music by: Ryan Shore
- Production companies: Southern Light Films; Scythia Films
- Distributed by: Umbrella Entertainment
- Release date: 23 July 2026 (New Zealand)
- Running time: 92 minutes
- Countries: New Zealand; Canada
- Language: English

I, Object is a 2026 live-action animated film written, produced, and directed by Andrew Niccol. Filming took place in 2024, and the film was released in New Zealand on 23 July 2026.

== Plot ==
10-year-old Tom is mourning his father's death, and escapes into his imagination by befriending everyday objects.

== Cast ==
- Bentley Storteboom as Tom
- Skywalker Hughes as Allie
- Ethan Hawke as Little Ben
- Karl Urban as Frank
- Jemaine Clement as Pop
- Anna Faris as Abigail

== Production ==
It was announced in May 2023 that Andrew Niccol had set the film as his next project, which will be a live action-animation hybrid. Melanie Lynskey, Karl Urban, Thomasin McKenzie and Jemaine Clement were set to star, with production expected to begin later in the year. In January 2024, Anna Faris replaced Lynskey in the film, as Lynskey had to exit due to scheduling conflicts.

Filming commenced in Wellington, New Zealand in January 2024.

== Music ==
The score for the film was composed by Ryan Shore.

== Release ==
I, Object was released in New Zealand by Umbrella Entertainment on 23 July 2026.
