= Crosby Fitzgerald =

American actress

- Born: 1989/1990; Georgia, United States
- Occupation: Actress
- Years active: 2012–present

Crosby Fitzgerald is an American actress. She is best known for playing Sylvia in the comedy drama series Palm Royale and Caroline Ingalls in the Netflix adaptation of Little House on the Prairie.

== Early life ==
Fitzgerald was born in Georgia. She has two brothers and three sisters. She graduated from St. Pius X Catholic High School in 2008. She is a graduate of the Neighborhood Playhouse School of the Theatre following in the footstep of legends such as Robert Duvall and Gregory Peck.

== Career ==
Early on in her career she appeared in the sitcoms Abbott Elementary, Awkwafina Is Nora from Queens and the drama series The First Lady. Her first big role came playing Sylvia in the comedy drama series Palm Royale. She played Madison in the true crime biographical drama series The Twisted Tale of Amanda Knox. In May 2025 it was revealed that she would play Caroline Ingalls in the reboot Little House on the Prairie. She played Madeleine in the crime film Crime 101 starring Chris Hemsworth.

== Filmography ==
=== Film ===
Year	Title	Role	Notes
2012	Inside	The Woman	Short
2017	Is There Anything Nick Lachey Can't Do?	Woman	Short
2018	Mother Comes to Venus	Rachel	Short
2019	A Girl on the Verge of Growing Up	Mary	Short
2019	Bread Pudding	Svetlana	Short
2019	People, People	Edie	
2024	Baby Bird	Party Girl	
2024	Goodrich	Annie	
2025	Sorry for Your Loss	Samantha	Short
2026	Crime 101	Madeleine	

=== Television ===
Year	Title	Role	Notes
2017	Educated Fleas	Ruth	5 episodes
2020	Awkwafina Is Nora from Queens	Bride	Episode; Atlantic City
2022	Abbott Elementary	Miss Kerman	Episode; Wishlist
2022	The First Lady	Carol	Episode; Please Allow Me
2024	Palm Royale	Sylvia	5 episodes
2025	The Twisted Tale of Amanda Knox	Madison	3 episodes
2026-Present	Little House on the Prairie	Caroline Ingalls	Main Cast
