= Emily Alabi =

American actress

- Occupation: Actress
- Years active: 2007–present

Emily Alabi is an American actress. She is best known for playing Dani Rhodes in the police procedural series FBI and Mahina in the CBS action series Magnum P.I..

== Early life ==
Alabi started off as a salsa dancer. She performed around the world with her brother Junior. She graduated from the University of California, Los Angeles.

== Career ==
Alabi began her career as a choreographer and dancer. She made her on-screen debut in the Nickelodeon series Ned's Declassified School Survival Guide. She made a one-off appearance in the drama series Jane the Virgin Her first recurring role was playing Cassandra in the superhero series Runaways. She has also had recurring roles as Mahina in the CBS action series Magnum P.I. and Shenandoah in the crime drama series Joe Pickett. She played Olivia Navarro on the drama series S.W.A.T. and had a minor role in the police procedural series FBI: International. She played Dani Rhodes in the police procedural series FBI. Her character was killed off after just one season as producers wanted to show viewers the dangers of being with the FBI.

== Filmography ==
=== Film ===
Year	Title	Role	Notes
2013	Solely	Dancer	Short
2020	The Christmas Edition	Dolores	TV movie
2021	Blending Christmas	Kat	TV movie
2025	The Vortex	Jackie	
2025	Ciao, Mama	Bri	

=== Television ===
Year	Title	Role	Notes
2007	Ned's Declassified School Survival Guide	Female Salsa Dancer #3	Episode: "Fundraising & Competition"
2013	Shake It Up	Competitor	Episode: "Quit It Up"
2014	Austin & Ally	Choreographer	Episode: "Princesses & Prizes"
2016	Teen Wolf	Skinwalker #2	Recurring Cast: Season 5
2016	NCIS	Officer Kelly Ristow	Episode: "Shell Game"
2018	Jane the Virgin	Dancer #1	Episode: "Chapter Seventy-Six"
2019	Runaways	Cassandra	Recurring Cast: Season 3
2022	The Rookie	Gabby Kane	Episode: "Coding"
2022–24	Magnum P.I.	Mahina	Guest: Season 4, Recurring Cast: Season 5
2023	Joe Pickett	Shenandoah	Recurring Cast: Season 2
2023	Found	Denae Wagon	Episode: "Missing While Indigenous"
2024–25	S.W.A.T.	Olivia Navarro	Recurring Cast: Season 7-8
2024	FBI: International	Natalie Rivers	Episode: "Death by Inches"
2025	FBI	SA Dani Rhodes	Recurring Cast: Season 7, Guest: Season 8
