= Skywalker Hughes =

Canadian-American actress

- Born: 2011 or 2012 (age 14–15); Toronto, Canada
- Occupation: Actress
- Years active: 2021–present

Skywalker Hughes is a Canadian-American actress. She is best known for playing Sheridan Pickett in the drama series Joe Pickett and Mary Ingalls in the Netflix adaptation Little House on the Prairie. Netflix recently renewed Little House on the Prairie for a second season.

== Early life ==
Hughes grew up in Toronto.

== Career ==
Hughes began her professional career playing the leading role of Sheridan Pickett in the drama series Joe Pickett. She starred alongside Hilary Swank in the Christian drama film Ordinary Angels. On May 5, 2025, it was revealed she had been cast as Mary Ingalls in the reboot Little House on the Prairie.

== Personal life ==
Hughes confirmed Skywalker is her given name and joked that if she ever has kids she will make sure they all get the middle name Walker.

== Filmography ==
=== Film ===
Year	Title	Role	Notes
2024	Ordinary Angels	Ashley	
2026	In the Blink of an Eye	Lark	
2026	Snowbound for the Holidays	Lilly Anderson	
2026	I, Object	Allie	

=== Television ===
Year	Title	Role	Notes
2022	Paw Patrol	Frankie	2 episodes
2023	Accused	Jo Jo Carlson	Episode: Billy's Story
2021–2023	Joe Pickett	Sheridan Pickett	20 episodes
2024	Xavier Riddle and the Secret Museum	Sonia Manzano	Episode: I Am Bruce Lee/I Am Sonia Manzano
2024	Blue's Clues & You!	Side Table Drawer	4 episodes
2026	The Gentleman's Race	Trina	10 episodes
2026	Little House on the Prairie	Mary Ingalls	16 episodes
