= Wren Zhawenim Gotts =

American actress

- Born: December 22, 2013 (age 12); Traverse City, Michigan
- Occupation: Actress
- Years active: 2023–present

Wren Zhawenim Gotts is an American actress. She is best known for playing Young Bonnie in the superhero miniseries Echo and plays Good Eagle in the reboot Little House on the Prairie.

== Early life ==
Gotts was born in Traverse City, Michigan on December 22, 2013. She gained popularity during the covid pandemic after her mother Rebecca posted her making Lego while speaking in Anishinaabemowin, the traditional Ojibwe language. Her native name is White Crane Girl. She is a member of the Sokaogon Chippewa Community of Mole Lake in Forest County. Despite being a primarily English speaker she is taking lessons online from the native language teacher Isadore Toulouse. Thanks to her ability to speak the language she won a new title in the Sokaogon Chippewa Community, becoming the tribe’s Tiny Tot Princess.

== Career ==
Her ability to speak her native tongue also got her first big role in television playing Young Bonnie in the superhero miniseries Echo. She was contacted by the Sarah Finn Casting Company and initially thought it was a joke. She was very familiar with the character prior to playing her She is set to gain worldwide fame after being cast as a brand new character named Good Eagle for the reboot series Little House on the Prairie.

== Personal life ==
Gotts started started dancing at age 3 and was trained by world champion Nakotah LaRance. When she was 7 she was invited to Santa Fe, New Mexico to perform with the Lightning Boy Youth Hoop Dancers.

== Filmography ==
=== Film ===
Year	Title	Role	Notes
2023	The 9th Inning	Ruby	Short

=== Television ===
Year	Title	Role	Notes
2023–2024	Echo	Young Bonnie	4 episodes
2024	Together We Can	Herself	1 episode
2026	Little House on the Prairie	Good Eagle	
