= Alice Halsey =

American actress

- Born: November 15, 2014 (age 11); United States
- Occupation: Actress
- Years active: 2023–present

Alice Halsey (born November 15, 2014) is an American actress. She is best known for playing Rachel Black in the soap opera Days of Our Lives and Laura Ingalls in the Netflix adaptation of Little House on the Prairie.

== Early life ==
Halsey was born in the United States on November 15, 2014.

== Career ==
Halsey made her acting debut playing Mad Zott in five episodes of the Apple TV+ miniseries Lessons in Chemistry. She made a one off appearance in the sitcom Night Court. She had a series regular role voicing Kat and Ellie on the Disney Junior show Kindergarten: The Musical. She received a 2026 Daytime Emmy nomination for Outstanding Emerging Talent in a Daytime Drama Series for playing the role of Rachel Black in the soap opera Days of Our Lives.She plays the lead role of Laura Ingalls in Netflix's new adaptation of Little House on the Prairie.

== Personal life ==
Alice's hobbies include drawing, reading books, and going on walks.

== Filmography ==
=== Film ===
Year	Title	Role	Notes
TBA	Ally Clark	TBA	Post-production

=== Television ===
Year	Title	Role	Notes
2023	Lessons in Chemistry	Madeline Zott	5 episodes
2023	Night Court	Virginia	Episode: "A Night Court Before Christmas"
2024–2025	Kindergarten: The Musical	Kat, Ellie	
2025–2026	Days of Our Lives	Rachel Black	
2026	Little House on the Prairie	Laura Ingalls	
