= Ernie Weckbaugh =

American journalist

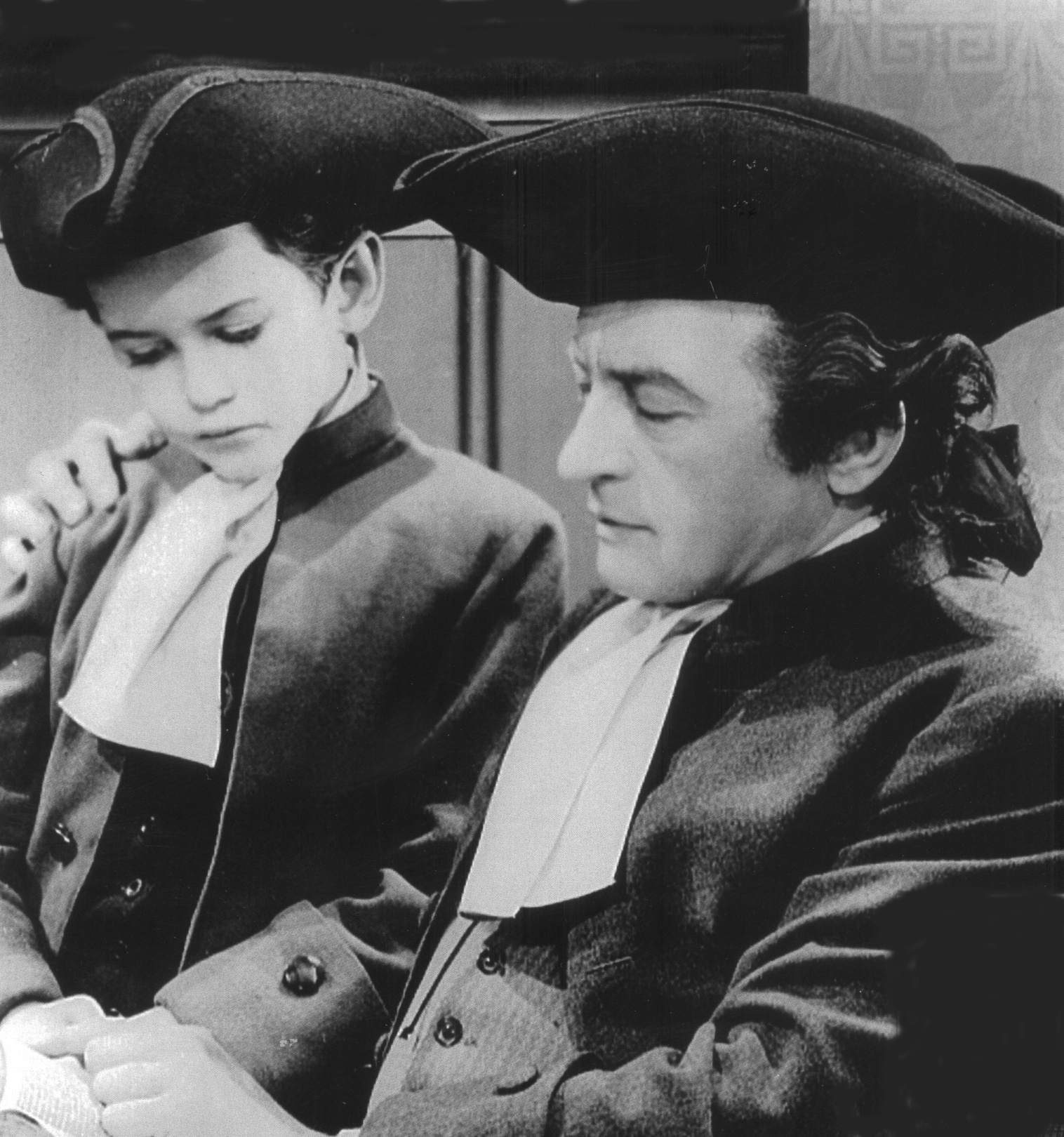
Child actor Ernie Weckbaugh with Claude Rains in 1939

Ernie Weckbaugh (born July 1931 in Beverly Hills, California - October 20, 2010) was a former actor and comedian who was an original cast member of the Our Gang comedies, where he played the uncredited role of "Stinkey". He later became a journalist, writing a weekly column for the Los Angeles Daily News.
