= Little House on the Prairie (2026 TV series) =

American Western family drama television series

- Release poster
- Genre: Western; Historical drama; Family drama
- Based on: Little House by Laura Ingalls Wilder
- Developed by: Rebecca Sonnenshine
- Showrunner: Rebecca Sonnenshine
- Starring: Luke Bracey; Crosby Fitzgerald; Alice Halsey; Skywalker Hughes; Warren Christie; Jocko Sims; Meegwun Fairbrother; Alyssa Wapanatâhk; Wren Zhawenim Gotts
- Composer: Dan Romer
- Country of origin: United States
- Original language: English
- No. of seasons: 1
- No. of episodes: 8

Production
- Executive producers: Rebecca Sonnenshine; Joy Gorman Wettels; Trip Friendly; Dana Fox; Susanna Fogel
- Running time: 42–57 minutes
- Production companies: Friendly Family Productions; Joy Coalition; Sonnenshine Productions; Foxy, Inc.; Anonymous Content; CBS Studios

Original release
- Network: Netflix
- Release: July 9, 2026 – present

Little House on the Prairie is a television series based on the Little House on the Prairie books written by Laura Ingalls Wilder. The series was developed by Rebecca Sonnenshine and produced by CBS Studios and Anonymous Content, and commissioned by Netflix in January 2025.

Little House on the Prairie premiered on Netflix on July 9, 2026. The series was renewed for a second season in March 2026, ahead of its premiere.

== Cast and characters ==
=== Main cast ===
- Alice Halsey as Laura Ingalls, the series' central protagonist. Laura is portrayed as curious, strong-willed, and quick to challenge authority, with a deep sense of justice. She is described as sharing her father's optimism and fearlessness and her mother's resourcefulness and honesty.
- Luke Bracey as Charles Ingalls, Laura's father, depicted as a farmer, trapper, carpenter, and musician. Charles is an optimist with a restless spirit, perpetually seeking new opportunities, a characterization that drives the family's westward journey.
- Crosby Fitzgerald as Caroline Ingalls, Laura's mother, portrayed as the pragmatic and steadying force of the family. Caroline gave up a career as a teacher to raise her children, and her marriage to Charles is depicted as a partnership of equals.
- Skywalker Hughes as Mary Ingalls, Laura's older sister. Where Laura is impulsive and at home in the natural world, Mary is studious, rule-abiding, and domestic. The two sisters are portrayed as best friends, who sometimes quarrel.
- Warren Christie as John Edwards, a Civil War veteran from Tennessee, depicted as gregarious and charming, with an air of mystery.
- Jocko Sims as Dr. George Tann, the local doctor, described as kindhearted and community-minded, with a warm bedside manner.
- Meegwun Fairbrother as William Mitchell, a successful farmer living with his family in Kansas, where he’s built an impressive homestead.
- Alyssa Wapanatâhk as White Sun, Mitchell's wife, portrayed as sharp-witted and perceptive, with a more skeptical view of the world than her husband.
- Wren Zhawenim Gotts as Good Eagle, Mitchell and White Sun's daughter, known within her family as an imaginative storyteller.

=== Supporting cast ===
- Xander Cole as Little Puma, White Sun's younger brother, depicted as good-hearted but stubborn, searching for his place in the world.
- Barrett Doss as Emily Henderson, a capable woman who runs the general store and takes in Caleb, an orphaned boy who wanders into town.
- Mary Holland as Jemma James, the wife of Eli James, portrayed as a confident, socially connected woman who serves as the town's busybody.
- Michael Hough as Eli James, Jemma's husband, who works for the railroad and is welcoming toward the new settlers arriving in the area.
- Ryan Robbins as Russell Kind, a grizzled, cynical settler.
- Kowen Cadorath as Caleb, an orphaned preteen boy who is taken in by Emily Henderson and given work at the general store.
- Thosh Collins as Louis, White Sun's cousin, described as good-natured and levelheaded.
- Maclean Fish as Adam Scott, a young man who appears to have had a sheltered life, with no visible experience of hardship.
- Rebecca Amzallag as Lacey Aubert, a widowed woman on the outskirts of the community who owns a cardroom and bar.
- Rachelle Lefevre as Eva Beadle, the patient and generous town schoolteacher.
- Willa Dunn as Nellie Oleson, a spoiled playground bully who is the rival and nemesis of Laura Ingalls
- Charlotte Sullivan as Margaret Oleson, mother of Nellie Oleson whom she loves unconditionally and will protect at all costs.

== Episodes ==
| No. | Title | Directed by | Written by | Original release date |
|---|---|---|---|---|
| 1 | "Independence" | Sarah Adina Smith | Television story by : Rebecca Sonnenshine; Teleplay by : Rebecca Sonnenshine | July 9, 2026 |
Caroline and Charles Ingalls leave Wisconsin with their daughters, Mary and Laura, hoping to claim land near Independence, Kansas. While crossing a river, their wagon nearly overturns, many supplies are lost, and their dog, Jack, is swept away. Dr. George Tann treats Caroline’s injury and directs Charles to someone, who can help him locate available land. Laura also encounters a young Osage girl traveling with her family. In Independence, Caroline learns that the settlement has no post office or school and they cannot afford all the supplies the family needs. Mary gains the attention of Caleb, a young store employee. After Charles leaves to inspect land, Laura mistakes wolves for Jack, forcing Caroline to shoot at them. The family begins building a house on their new land. Laura later discovers that a doll she found earlier belongs to the Osage girl and returns it to her, though Caroline warns Laura against further contact. The Osage discuss the settlers occupying land. Caroline breaks her foot while helping build the house. Dr. Tann treats her and tells Charles that she is pregnant. He warns that the family will need help to survive. Charles asks John Edwards for assistance, but Edwards reacts violently before later apologizing. Charles offers to return east once Caroline recovers, she insists they continue. Jack returns with Edwards, who offers to help build the Ingalls’ house. Edwards warns Charles that the land is not as free as they were led to believe.
| 2 | "The House on the Prairie" | Julie Anne Robinson | Rebecca Sonnenshine | July 9, 2026 |
Charles dreams of his deceased younger brother George, leading him to suggest the name George if Caroline gives birth to a boy. They inform the girls of Caroline's pregnancy, and Laura is distressed that Pa would prefer a newborn son over her. Mr. Edwards begins helping Charles in constructing the Ingalls' new home, bonding with the Ingalls family. Independence Women's Society leader Jemma James pays Caroline a social visit, informing her of the goings-on about town and warning her of Edwards' drinking habits. Later that evening, Caroline catches Edwards drinking and tells him to leave lest he put her family at risk. When Edwards does not return the following morning and cannot be found at his camp, Caroline confesses to Charles she had a hand in his disappearance. Charles requests the help of his Osage neighbor, William, in searching for Edwards. Laura begins a budding friendship with William's daughter Good Eagle. Charles finds that Edwards has sold his belongings and begun riding north. Meanwhile, Laura and Mary get lost in tall grass looking for Edwards, resulting in a search party being mobilized. The girls encounter a frightening group of campers in the woods, only to be saved by Edwards. He returns the girls to Caroline but leaves before she can apologize to him. A man named Adam Scott begins helping Charles to finish construction on the house. As they work, a number of Native Americans process past the campsite, to Laura's excitement and the rest of her family's concern.
| 3 | "News of the World" | Julie Anne Robinson | Francesca Butler | July 9, 2026 |
Land relationships in Independence become more complicated as the Ingalls household is visited by two Osage men.
| 4 | "Life Let Us Cherish" | Kat Candler | P. Carter Kristensen | July 9, 2026 |
Fever strikes several members of the Ingalls family.
| 5 | "A Circle of Blue Sky" | Kat Candler | Adam Starks | July 9, 2026 |
The local church in Independence begins construction. The Ingalls women attempt to connect to local prominent women. Edwards is accused of stealing local horses, but is exonerated by Charles.
| 6 | "Peace on Earth" | Erica Tremblay | Eleanor Burgess | July 9, 2026 |
Christmas and a new baby comes to the Ingalls family.
| 7 | "A Softer Note in the Sound of the Wind" | Sydney Freeland | Tom Hanada | July 9, 2026 |
Osage chiefs meet to consider the treaty to sell their land, as the town welcomes a new Reverend. Laura and Good Eagle hunt for "treasure" around town.
| 8 | "This is Now" | Sydney Freeland | Adam Starks & Eleanor Burgess | July 9, 2026 |
Founder's Day, celebrating 2 years of the town, brings reflections on the future for the residents of Independence. In the middle of festivities, a fast moving prairie fire from a passing storm threatens the town.

== Production ==
=== Development ===
In December 2020, it was announced that Paramount TV Studios and Anonymous Content would be developing an hour-long drama series based on Wilder’s Little House on the Prairie novel. At the time, the series was set to be executive produced by Trip Friendly for Friendly Family Productions, Joy Gorman Wettels for Joy Coalition, and Dana Fox. CBS Studios absorbed Paramount TV Studios’ slate in 2024.

Netflix officially ordered the first season of the new Little House on the Prairie adaptation in January 2025. At that time, Rebecca Sonnenshine was announced as an executive producer and series showrunner. Susanna Fogel was also added as an executive producer.

Speaking in February 2025, actress Melissa Gilbert, who played Laura Ingalls Wilder on the entire run of the earlier series, said she had no issue with the new adaptation and that there was "plenty of room" for "someone else's interpretation". Original cast members Alison Arngrim and Dean Butler told ReMIND Magazine the new series would be more focused on the original books, rather than a reboot of their series. They also responded to the social media reaction from commentator Megyn Kelly, who had posted on Twitter that "if you wokeify Little House on the Prairie I will make it my singular mission to absolutely ruin your project." Members of the original cast responded by pointing out that the original series addressed topics that would be considered "woke" today, such as racism, addiction, nativism, antisemitism, misogyny, rape, spousal abuse and other topics.

The series was renewed for a second season on March 3, 2026.

=== Casting ===
An open casting call for the main role of young Laura and other main cast members was announced in March 2025. In April 2025, 10 year-old actress Alice Halsey was cast in the role of Laura Ingalls, with Luke Bracey, Crosby Fitzgerald, and Skywalker Hughes cast the following month in the roles of Charles, Caroline, and Mary respectively. Later cast were Warren Christie as John Edwards, Meegwun Fairbrother as Mitchell, Wren Zhawenim Gotts as Good Eagle, Alyssa Wapanatǎhk as White Sun and Jocko Sims as Dr. George Tann. In July 2025, Mary Holland and Barrett Doss were amongst seven more additions to the cast. In May 2026, it was announced that Willa Dunn would play Nellie Oleson in Season 2. Rachelle Lefevre and Charlotte Sullivan were added to the Season 2 cast in June 2026, with Lefevre in the role of the town schoolteacher, Eva Beadle, and Sullivan playing Margaret Oleson, mother of Nellie Oleson.

=== Filming ===
Principal photography began on June 10, 2025, and filming wrapped in October 2025. Filming locations include Winnipeg, Canada.

Winnipeg filming dates for the second season are set for June 12 through October 30.

== Release ==
Little House on the Prairie premiered on Netflix on July 9, 2026.

== Reception ==
Little House on the Prairie received mixed and positive reception On the review aggregator website Rotten Tomatoes, the series holds a 79% approval rating based on 62 reviews, with an average of rated reviews of 6.8/10. The website's critics consensus reads, "Little House on the Prairie dusts off the 70s and enters a new era of conscious creation and adaptation, striking the right balance between nostalgia and inspiration to craft a new and enlivened path for itself." Metacritic, which uses a weighted average, gave a score of 67 out of 100 based on 29 critics, indicating "generally favorable" reviews.
