= List of Telugu film actors =

The following is a list of Indian male actors who have worked in Telugu cinema, the commercial Telugu-language film industry based in Hyderabad.

Actors are listed alphabetically by given name.

== A ==
- Aadarsh Balakrishna
- Aadhi Pinisetty
- Aadi Saikumar
- Aadukalam Naren
- Aanand Vardhan
- Abbas
- Abhimanyu Singh
- Abhinav Gomatam
- Abhinay Vaddi
- Abhinaya Krishna
- Abhishek Banerjee
- Abijeet
- Abu Salim
- Achyuth
- Achyuth Kumar
- Adithya Menon
- Aditya Babu
- Aditya Om
- Aditya Seal
- Adivi Sesh
- Ahuti Prasad
- Ajay
- Ajay Ghosh
- Ajaz Khan
- Ajith Kumar
- Ajmal Ameer
- Akash Puri
- Akhil Akkineni
- Akul Balaji
- Ali
- Ali Reza
- Allari Naresh
- Allu Arjun
- Allu Sirish
- Amit Purohit
- Amit Tiwari
- Amithash Pradhan
- Amrish Puri
- Anand
- Anand Deverakonda
- Anandaraj
- Anantha Sriram
- Aniissh Tejeshwar
- Anil Kapoor
- Anil Murali
- Anish Kuruvilla
- Ankith Koyya
- Annu Kapoor
- Anuj Gurwara
- Anvesh Michael
- Arjan Bajwa
- Arjun Das
- Arjun Sarja
- Arun Pandian
- Arun Vijay
- Arvind Krishna
- Aryan Rajesh
- Ashok Selvan
- Ashwin Babu
- Ashwin Kumar Lakshmikanthan
- Atul Parchure
- Avinash Yelandur
- AVS
- Ayyappa P. Sharma
- Aziz Naser

== B ==
- B. R. Panthulu
- Babloo Prithiveeraj
- Babu Antony
- Babu Mohan
- Baburaj
- Bala
- Baladitya
- Balijepalli Lakshmikantha Kavi
- Banda Kanakalingeswara Rao
- Banerjee
- Bank Janardhan
- Bellamkonda Sai Sreenivas
- Bellary Raghava
- Bhanu Chander
- Bharath
- Bharath Reddy
- Bhuvana Chandra
- Bob Christo
- Bobby Simha
- Boman Irani
- Brahmaji
- Brahmanandam

== C ==
- C. S. R. Anjaneyulu
- C. S. Rao
- C. S. Rao (writer)
- C. V. L. Narasimha Rao
- Captain Raju
- Ceylon Manohar
- Chadalavada
- Chaitanya Krishna
- Chaitanya Rao Madadi
- Chakrapani Ananda
- Chakri Toleti
- Chalam
- Chalapathi Rao
- Chandra Mohan (Telugu actor)
- Charan Raj
- Charandeep
- Chatrapathi Sekhar
- Chetan Hansraj
- Chetan Maddineni
- Chi. Guru Dutt
- Chikkanna
- Chinna
- Chirag Jani
- Chiranjeevi
- Chitram Srinu
- Chitti Babu (Telugu actor)

== D ==
- Dasari Arun Kumar
- Dasari Narayana Rao
- Dev Gill
- Dev Mohan
- Devan
- Devaraj
- Dhananjaya
- Dhanraj Koranani
- Dharmavarapu Subramanyam
- Dheekshith Shetty
- Dheer Charan Srivastav
- Dhulipala
- Diganth Manchale
- Dino Morea
- Dulquer Salmaan
- Duniya Vijay
- Duvvasi Mohan

== E ==
- Edida Nageswara Rao
- Edward Sonnenblick
- Elango Kumaravel

== F ==
- Fahadh Faasil
- FEFSI Vijayan
- Fish Venkat

== G ==
- G. Ramineedu
- G. V. Sudhakar Naidu
- Gautham Raju
- Getup Srinu
- Ghantasala Balaramayya
- Giri Babu
- Gollapudi Maruti Rao
- Goparaju Ramana
- Gopichand
- Gopichand Lagadapati
- Govind Padmasoorya
- Govindarajula Subba Rao
- Gummadi
- Gundu Hanumantha Rao
- Gundu Sudarshan

== H ==
- Haranath
- Harish Kumar
- Harish Uthaman
- Harsha Chemudu
- Harsha Vardhan
- Harshvardhan Rane
- Havish
- Hemant Birje
- Hyper Aadi

== I ==
- Indrajith Sukumaran

== J ==
- J. D. Chakravarthy
- J. Livingston
- J. V. Ramana Murthi
- J. V. Somayajulu
- Jackie Shroff
- Jagadeesh Prathap Bandari
- Jagapathi Babu
- Jaggayya
- Jai Akash
- Jatin Grewal
- Jaya Prakash Reddy
- Jeeva (Telugu actor)
- Jisshu Sengupta
- Jithan Ramesh
- Jolly Bastian
- Junaid Sheikh

== K ==
- K. B. Nagabhushanam
- K. V. Anudeep
- K. Viswanath
- Kaala Bhairava
- Kabir Duhan Singh
- Kaikala Satyanarayana
- Kallu Chidambaram
- Kalyaan Dhev
- Kamal Haasan
- Kamal Kamaraju
- Kanal Kannan
- Kancharapalem Raju
- Kantha Rao
- Karthik
- Karthik Jayaram
- Karthik Rathnam
- Kartikeya Gummakonda
- Kasturi Siva Rao
- Kathi Mahesh
- Khayyum
- Kiran Abbavaram
- Kireeti Damaraju
- Kishore (actor, born 1974)
- Kitty
- Koccharlakota Satyanarayana
- Kodi Ramakrishna
- Kollam Thulasi
- Kona Venkat
- Krish Jagarlamudi
- Krishna (Telugu actor)
- Krishna Bhagavan
- Krishnam Raju
- Krishnudu
- Kumar Bangarappa
- Kundara Johny
- Kurush Deboo

== L ==
- L. B. Sriram
- L. V. Prasad
- Lakshmipati
- Lal

== M ==
- M. N. Nambiar
- M. Prabhakar Reddy
- M. S. Narayana
- M. Sasikumar
- Mada Venkateswara Rao
- Madala Ranga Rao
- Madhavapeddi Satyam
- Madhu
- Madhunandan
- Madhusudhan Rao
- Maharshi Raghava
- Mahat Raghavendra
- Mahendran
- Mahesh Babu
- Mahesh Manjrekar
- Makarand Deshpande
- Mallikarjuna Rao
- Mammootty
- Manikandan R. Achari
- Mannava Balayya
- Mano (singer)
- Manoj K. Jayan
- Manoj Nandam
- Master Bharath
- Master Manjunath
- Master Prabhakar
- Mikkilineni
- Mime Gopi
- Mohan
- Mohan Raj
- Mohan Sharma
- Mohanlal
- Moola Narayana Swamy
- Mudigonda Lingamurthy
- Mukesh Khanna
- Mukesh Rishi
- Mukesh Tiwari
- Mukkamala
- Mukku Raju
- Mukul Dev
- Murali Mohan
- Murali Sharma
- Muralidhar Goud

== N ==
- N. N. Pillai
- N. S. Krishnan
- N. T. Rama Rao Jr.
- Nag Ashwin
- Naga Chaitanya
- Naga Shaurya
- Nagabhushanam
- Nagendra Babu
- Nagesh
- Nagineedu
- Nakuul Mehta
- Nalinikanth
- Namo Narayana
- Nandamuri Balakrishna
- Nandamuri Kalyan Ram
- Nandamuri Kalyana Chakravarthy
- Nandu (Telugu actor)
- Nani
- Napoleon
- Nara Rohith
- Narasimha Raju (Telugu actor)
- Narayan Lucky
- Naresh
- Narsing Yadav
- Nassar
- Navdeep
- Naveen Chandra
- Naveen Polishetty
- Nikhil Kumaraswamy
- Nikhil Siddhartha
- Nirmal Pandey
- Nishan Nanaiah
- Nizhalgal Ravi
- Noel Sean
- Nutan Prasad

== O ==
- Om Puri

== P ==
- P. Jairaj
- P. L. Narayana
- P. Ravi Shankar
- P. Sai Kumar
- P. Samuthirakani
- P. Vasu
- Padmanabham
- Panja Vaisshnav Tej
- Pankaj Kesari
- Pankaj Tripathi
- Pankaj Tripathi filmography
- Parameshwar Hivrale
- Paruchuri Gopala Krishna
- Pasupathy
- Pavan Malhotra
- Pawan Kalyan
- Pawan Krishna
- Peesapati Narasimha Murty
- Peketi Sivaram
- Peter Hein
- Piyush Mishra
- Posani Krishna Murali
- Potti Prasad
- Potti Veerayya
- Prabhakar
- Prabhas
- Prabhas Sreenu
- Prabhu
- Prabhu Deva
- Pradeep Kondiparthi
- Pradeep Machiraju
- Pradeep Rawat
- Pradeep Shakthi
- Prakash Belawadi
- Prakash Kovelamudi
- Prakash Raj
- Pramod Panju
- Prasad Babu
- Prashant Narayanan
- Prashanth
- Pratap Pothen
- Praveen
- Prince Cecil
- Prithviraj Sukumaran
- Priyadarshi Pulikonda
- Priyadarshini Ram
- Prudhvi Raj
- Pruthvi Ambaar
- Puneet Issar
- Puvvula Suri Babu
- Pyramid Natarajan

== R ==
- R. N. Sudarshan
- R. Narayana Murthy
- R. P. Patnaik
- R. Sarathkumar
- Raavi Kondala Rao
- Rag Mayur
- Raghava Lawrence
- Raghavan
- Raghu Babu
- Raghu Kunche
- Raghu Ram
- Raghunatha Reddy
- Raghuvaran
- Rahman
- Rahul Dev
- Rahul Haridas
- Rahul Madhav
- Rahul Ram
- Rahul Ramakrishna
- Rahul Ravi
- Rahul Ravindran
- Rahul Vijay
- Raj Deepak Shetty
- Raj Tarun
- Raja (Tamil actor)
- Raja (Telugu actor)
- Raja Babu
- Raja Ravindra
- Rajan P. Dev
- Rajanala
- Rajasekhar
- Rajat Bedi
- Rajeev (Tamil actor)
- Rajeev Kanakala
- Rajendra Prasad
- Rajinikanth
- Rajith Menon
- Rajkumar Kasireddy
- Rajkumar Sethupathi
- Rakendu Mouli
- Rakshit Atluri
- Ram Charan
- Ram Karthik
- Ram Mohan
- Ram Pothineni
- Ramachandra Raju
- Ramana
- Ramana Reddy
- Ramaraju
- Ramesh Aravind
- Ramesh Babu
- Rami Reddy
- Ramki
- Rana Daggubati
- Ranjit Barot
- Rao Ramesh
- Rathna Shekar Reddy
- Ravi Babu
- Ravi Kale
- Ravi Kishan
- Ravi Krishna (actor, born 1983)
- Ravi Krishna (actor, born 1989)
- Ravi Mariya
- Ravi Prakash
- Ravi Teja
- Ravi Varma (East Godavari actor)
- Ravi Varma (Kakinada actor)
- Ravindra Vijay
- Remo Fernandes
- Richard Rishi
- Rishab Shetty
- Riyaz Khan
- Roll Rida
- Ronson Vincent
- Roshan Meka

== S ==
- S. K. Misro
- S. P. Balasubrahmanyam
- S. P. Charan
- S. V. Ranga Rao
- Sachiin J. Joshi
- Sachin Khedekar
- Sadhu Kokila
- Sagar
- Sai Chand
- Sai Dharam Tej
- Sai Dheena
- Sai Ketan Rao
- Sai Kiran
- Sai Kumar (Malayalam actor)
- Sai Ronak
- Sairam Shankar
- Sakshi Ranga Rao
- Salim Baig
- Samarjit Lankesh
- Sameer (Telugu actor)
- Sampath Raj
- Sampath Ram
- Sampoornesh Babu
- Samrat Mukherjee
- Sandeep Madhav
- Sandeep Raj
- Sandeep Reddy Vanga
- Sandy (choreographer)
- Sangay Tsheltrim
- Sangeeth Sobhan
- Sanjay Mitra
- Santo Krishnan
- Santosh Sobhan
- Saptagiri
- Sarath Babu
- Sarathi (comedian)
- Sarvadaman D. Banerjee
- Sathyaraj
- Satya (Telugu actor)
- Satya Prakash
- Satyadev
- Satyam Rajesh
- Saurabh Sachdeva
- Sayaji Shinde
- Sendrayan
- Sethu
- Shaam
- Shafeeq
- Shafi
- Shaji Chen
- Shankar Melkote
- Shanmukh Jaswanth
- Shanmukha Srinivas
- Sharad Kelkar
- Sharat Saxena
- Sharwanand
- Shashank
- Shatru
- Shawar Ali
- Shekar Basha
- Shine Tom Chacko
- Shiva Kandukuri
- Shiva Rajkumar
- Shravan Reddy
- Siddharth
- Siddhu Jonnalagadda
- Sirivennela Seetharama Sastry
- Siva Balaji
- Sivaji (Telugu actor)
- Sivaji Ganesan
- Sivaji Raja
- Sivakarthikeyan
- Sivamani (percussionist)
- Sivannarayana Naripeddi
- Sobhan
- Sobhan Babu
- Sonu Sood
- Sree Vishnu
- Sri Simha Koduri
- Srihari
- Sriimurali
- Srikanth (actor, born 1968)
- Srikanth (actor, born 1979)
- Srikanth Iyengar
- Sriman
- Srinivas Avasarala
- Srinivasa Murthy (voice actor)
- Srinivasa Reddy
- Sritej
- Sthanam Narasimha Rao
- Stunt Silva
- Subbaraju
- Subbaraya Sarma
- Subbu Panchu
- Subhalekha Sudhakar
- Sudeepa
- Sudev Nair
- Sudhakar
- Sudhakar Komakula
- Sudharshan
- Sudheer Babu
- Sudheer Varma
- Sudigali Sudheer
- Suman
- Sumanth
- Sumanth Ashwin
- Sumanth Shailendra
- Sundeep Kishan
- Sunil
- Supreeth Reddy
- Suresh (actor, born 1963)
- Suresh Oberoi
- Surya (Telugu actor)
- Surya Kiran (director)
- Surya Srinivas
- Sushanth
- Suthi Veerabhadra Rao
- Suthi Velu

== T ==
- T. S. B. K. Moulee
- Tanikella Bharani
- Tanish
- Taraka Ratna
- Tarun (Telugu actor)
- Tarun Arora
- Teja Sajja
- Thagubothu Ramesh
- Thakur Anoop Singh
- Thalaivasal Vijay
- Tharun Bhascker
- Thilakan
- Thiruveer
- Thrigun
- Tiger Prabhakar
- Tinnu Anand
- Tripuraribhatla Ramakrishna Sastry

== U ==
- Uday Kiran
- Udaykumar
- Unni Mukundan
- Upen Patel
- Upendra

== V ==
- V. N. Anoop Kumar
- V. Nagayya
- Vadde Naveen
- Vaibhav Reddy
- Vajrang Shetty
- Vallabhaneni Janardhan
- Valluri Balakrishna
- Vamsi Krishna
- Vangara Venkata Subbaiah
- Varun Sandesh
- Varun Tej
- Vasishta N. Simha
- Vasu Inturi
- Vatsal Sheth
- Venigalla Rambabu
- Venkatesh
- Venkatesh Maha
- Vennela Kishore
- Venu Madhav
- Venu Thottempudi
- Venu Yeldandi
- Vidyut Jammwal
- Vijay Babu (actor, born 1951)
- Vijay Deverakonda
- Vijay Sai
- Vijay Sethupathi
- Vijay Varma
- Vijayachander
- Vijayakumar (Tamil actor)
- Vikram
- Vikram Singh
- Vikramjeet Virk
- Vinay Rai
- Vineet Kumar
- Vineeth
- Vinod Kumar Alva
- Vinoth Kishan
- Viraj Ashwin
- Vishal
- Vishnu Manchu
- Vishwadev Rachakonda
- Viswant Duddumpudi
- Vizag Prasad
- VJ Sunny
- VTV Ganesh

== Y ==
- Y. Kasi Viswanath
- Yadavalli Suryanarayana
- Yog Japee

== See also ==
- List of Indian film actors
- List of Indian film actresses
- List of Telugu film actresses
- List of Indian television actors
- Lists of actors
