= Lists of actors by country =

The following are lists of actors by country.

== America ==
- List of American film actresses
- List of American television actresses
- List of African-American actors
- List of American actors of Irish descent
- List of current American child actors
- List of former American child actors
- List of Italian-American actors
- List of Native American actors

== Armenia ==
- List of Armenian actors

== Australia ==
- List of Australian actors

== Azerbaijan ==
- List of Azerbaijani actors

== Bhutan ==
- List of Bhutanese actors

== Cambodia ==
- List of Cambodian film actors

== China ==
- List of Chinese actors
- List of Chinese actresses
- List of Chinese child actors

== Czech Republic ==
- List of Czech actresses
- List of Czech male actors

== Italy ==
- List of Italian actresses
- List of Italian actors

== India ==
=== By language ===
- List of Bengali actresses
- List of Bhojpuri actors
- List of Bhojpuri actresses
- List of Hindi film actors
- List of Hindi film actresses
- List of Hindi television actresses
- List of Kannada film actresses
- List of Malayalam film actors
- List of Marathi film actors
- List of Marathi film actresses
- List of actors of Tamil origin
- List of Tamil film actors
- List of Tamil film actresses
- List of Telugu film actors
- List of Telugu film actresses

=== Other ===
- List of Indian male film actors
- List of Indian film actresses
- List of Indian television actors
- List of Indian television actresses
- List of Indian child actors
- List of Indian comedians
- List of singing actors in Indian cinema

== Iran ==
- List of Iranian actresses
- List of Iranian male actors

== Japan ==
- List of Japanese actors
- List of Japanese actresses
- List of Japanese child actors

== Myanmar ==
- List of Burmese actors

== North Korea ==
- List of North Korean actors

== Pakistan ==
- List of Pakistani actresses
- List of Pakistani male actors

== Philippines ==
- List of Filipino actresses
- List of current Filipino child actors
- List of former Filipino child actors
- List of Filipino male actors

== South Korea ==
- List of South Korean actresses
- List of South Korean male actors

== Thailand ==
- List of Thai actresses
- List of Thai male actors

== See also ==
- Lists of actors by television series
