= Pranam Khareedu =

1978 Indian Telugu-language film

- Theatrical release poster
- Directed by: K. Vasu
- Written by: C. S. Rao (story and dialogues)
- Produced by: Kranthi Kumar
- Starring: Rao Gopal Rao; Jayasudha; Chandra Mohan; Chiranjeevi; Kaikala Satyanarayana; Nutan Prasad; Ramaprabha
- Cinematography: B. S. Lokanath; R. Raghunatha Reddy
- Music by: K. Chakravarthy
- Release date: 22 September 1978
- Country: India
- Language: Telugu

Pranam Khareedu (transl. Cost of Life) is a 1978 Indian Telugu-language film directed by K. Vasu. It starred Jayasudha, Rao Gopal Rao, Chandra Mohan, Chiranjeevi, Mahasweta Ray, and Madhavi in a guest appearance. The film released on 22 September 1978. The film is based on a play written by C. S. Rao. It is the debut film for character actor Kota Srinivasa Rao. Chiranjeevi started his film career with Punadhirallu. However, his first released film was Pranam Khareedu.

== Plot ==
In the pre-independence India, a village landlord Kanakayya (Rao Gopal Rao) marries Sita (Jayasudha), who is young enough to be his daughter, with the help of village Munsif (Nutan Prasad). However, he puts a lot of restrictions on her after the marriage. Sita's brother Bangaram (Chalam) comes from the town and eyes Bangari (Reshmi Roy), Kanakayya's deaf and dumb servant Devudu's (Chandramohan) sister. Bangari is in love with Narasimha (Chiranjeevi), another servant of Kanakayya. Bangaram rapes Bangari. Kanakayya suspects that Sita is in love with Devudu, and in a fit of rage, he kills them both one day. People revolt against Kanakayya and kill him in the end.

== Cast ==
- Rao Gopal Rao as Kanakayya
- Jayasudha as Sita (Kankayya's Second Wife)
- Chandra Mohan as Devudu
- Chiranjeevi as Narasimha
- Mahasweta Ray as Bangari (Devudu's sister)
- Kaikala Satyanarayana
- Nutan Prasad as Munsif Bullabbai
- Ramaprabha as Chaakali Subbi
- Chalam as Bangaram (Sita's brother)
- Madhavi as Venkatalakshmi
- Jit Mohan Mitra
- N. D. Lakshmi
- Jeeva
- R. Narayana Murthy
- Kota Srinivasa Rao
- Kota Sankara Rao

== Production ==
Pranam Khareedu was based on play of same name of C. S. Rao who wrote dialogues also for the film adaptation. The film's director K. Vasu did not wanted to do this film however Kranthi Kumar forced him to do it. They both saw the play and liked it and decided the casting of Rao Gopal Rao, Jayasudha and Chandramohan after watching the play. Rao Gopal Rao played the role of Kanakayya which was originally portrayed in the play by Kota Srinivasa Rao who also appeared in the film in a small role of a villager. Though Chiranjeevi made his acting debut with Punadhi rallu, it was Pranam Khareedu which became his first to be released. Kranthi Kumar who saw Chiranjeevi during the shoot of Punadhi rallu offered him the role of Narasimha after his assistant recommended him. He replace him with Satyendra Kumar who was the original choice for the role. Oriya actress Mahasweta was chosen to portray Bangari. The film also marked the debut of Raghunatha Reddy as cinematographer. The entire shooting was done in Pottilanka village near Dhavaleswaram. All hamlet shots were done amidst natural locations in Vemagiri. The film was completed in single schedule.

== Soundtrack ==
Pranam Khareedu

Soundtrack album by K. Chakravarthy
- Released: 1978
- Recorded: 1978
- Genre: Feature Film Soundtrack
- Length: 17:28
- Label: Mango Music
- Producer: Kranthi Kumar

No.	Title	Lyrics	Music	Singer(s)	Length
1.	"Bandameeda Undi Gundodi Debba"	Jaladi Raja Rao	K. Chakravarthy	L. R. Eswari	3:49
2.	"Enniyallo Enniyallo Endaka"	Jaladi Raja Rao	K. Chakravarthy	Chandrasekhar, G. Anand and S. P. Sailaja	4:28
3.	"Etamesi Todina Eru Endadu"	Jaladi Raja Rao	K. Chakravarthy	S. P. Balasubrahmanyam	4:45
4.	"Nomallo Mamilla Tota Kada"	Jaladi Raja Rao	K. Chakravarthy	S. Janaki	4:26
Total length:					17:28
