= List of Indian male film actors =

Hindi cinema
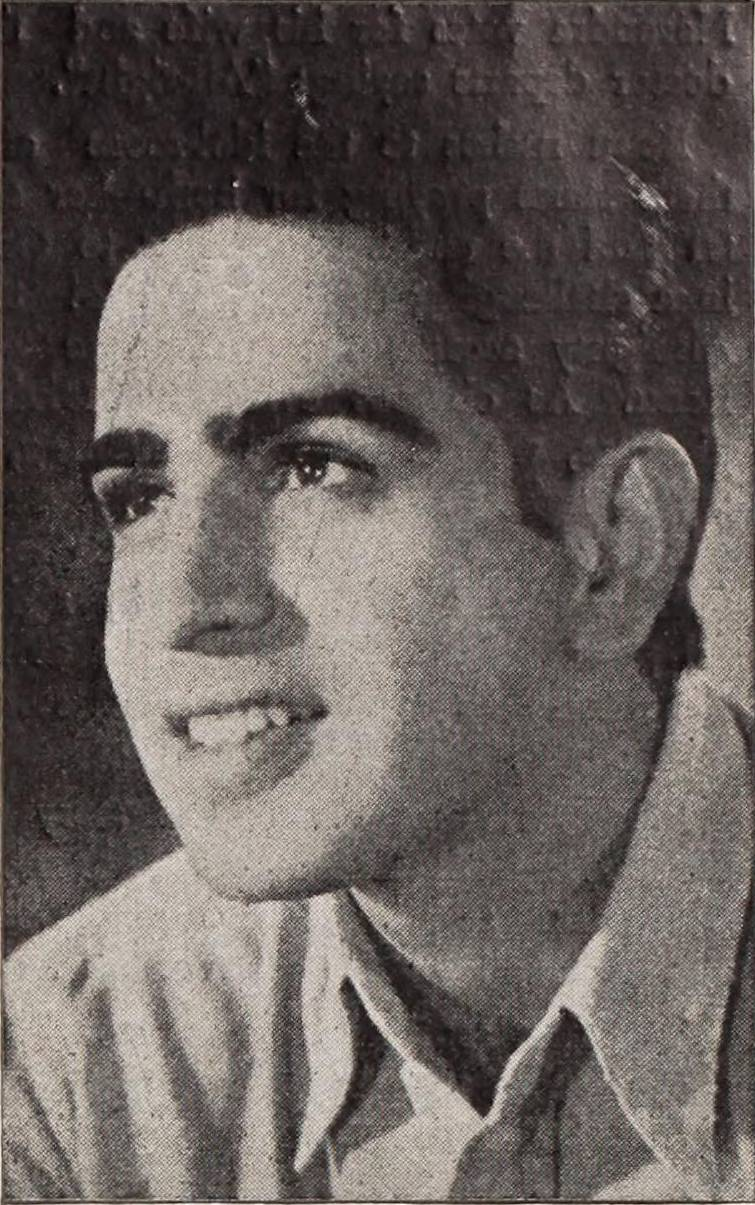
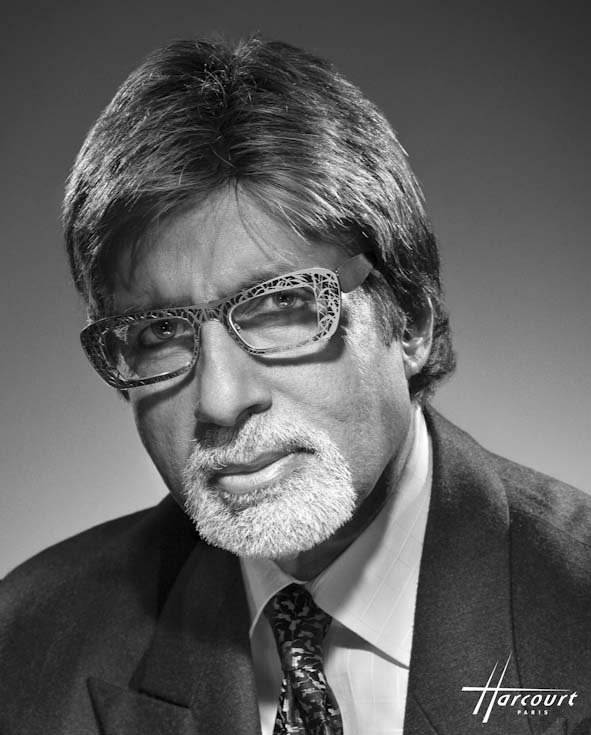
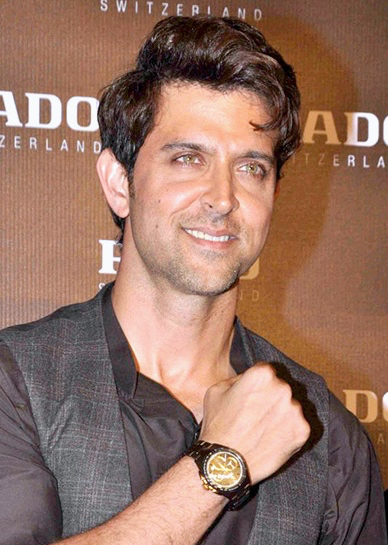
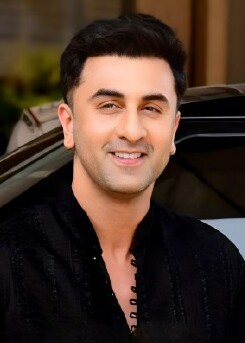
(left to right) Dilip Kumar, Amitabh Bachchan, Shahrukh Khan, Hrithik Roshan and Ranbir Kapoor

Telugu cinema
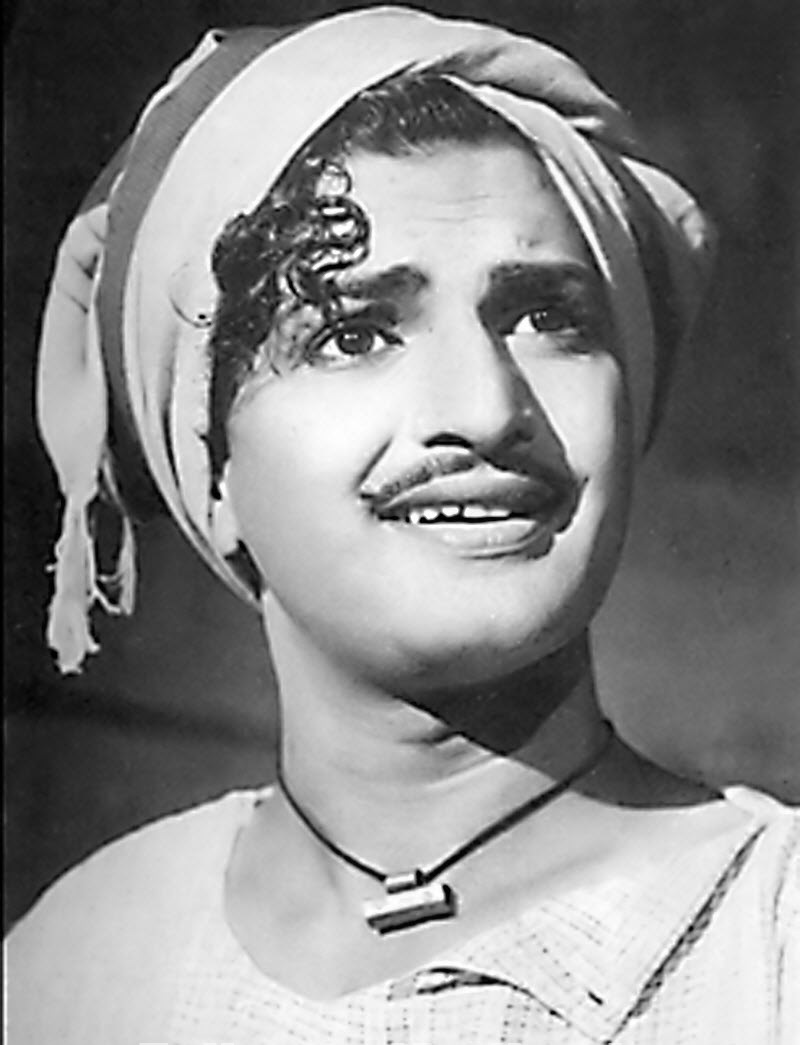
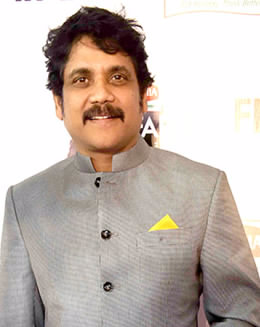
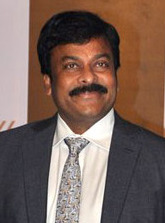
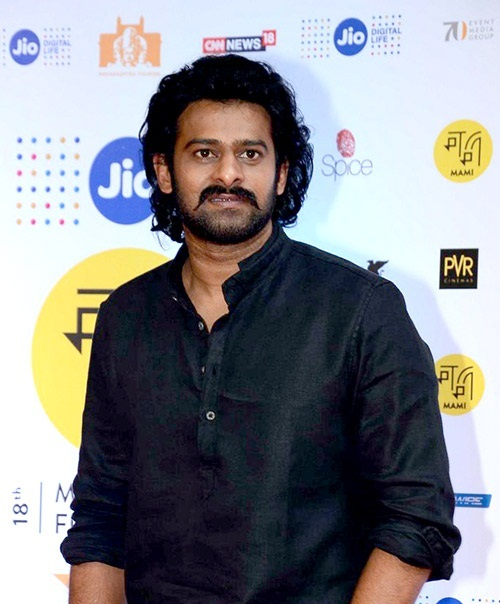
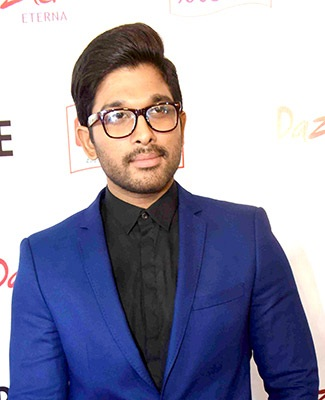
(left to right) N. T. Rama Rao, Nagarjuna, Chiranjeevi, Prabhas and Allu Arjun

Tamil cinema
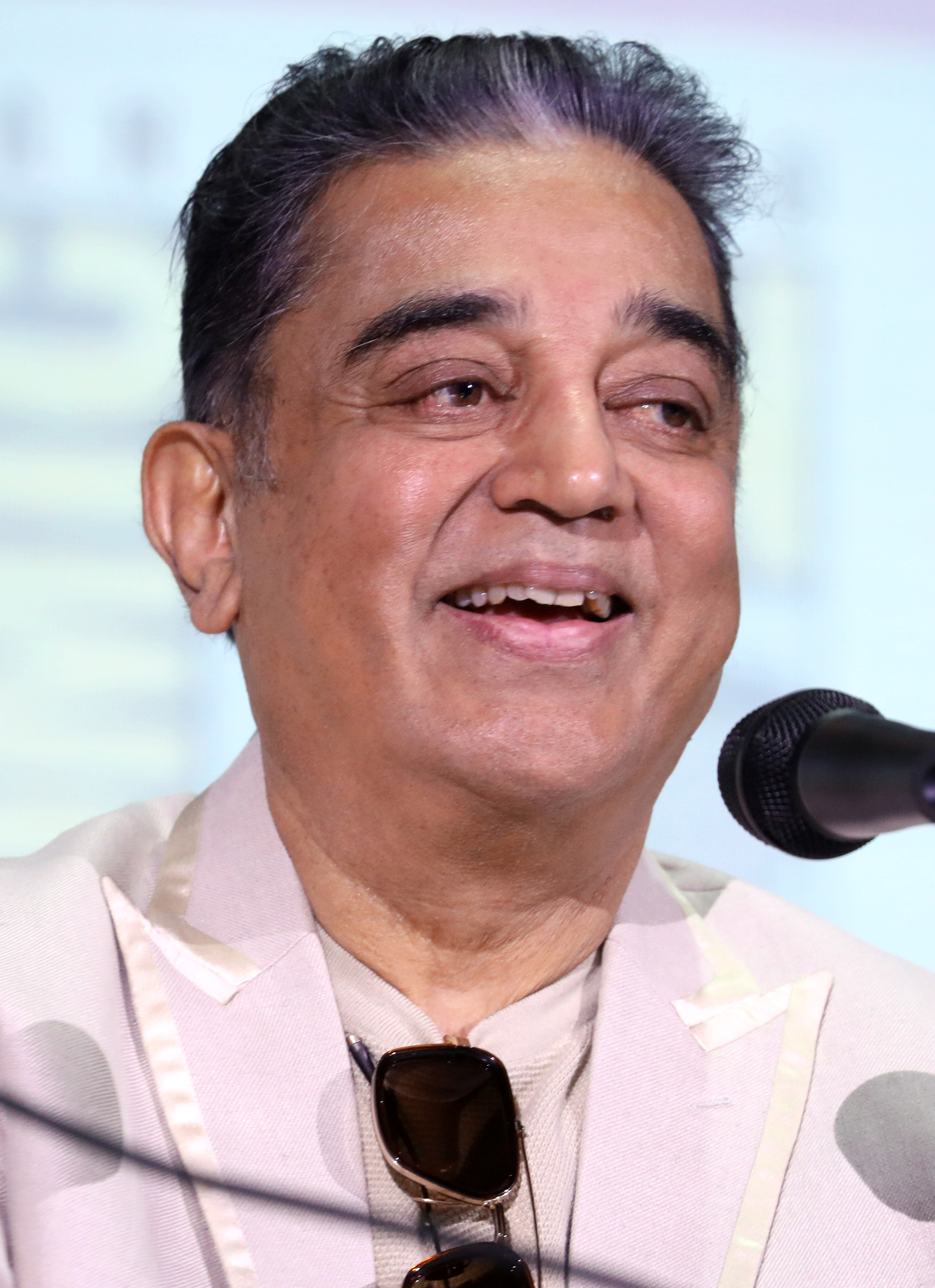
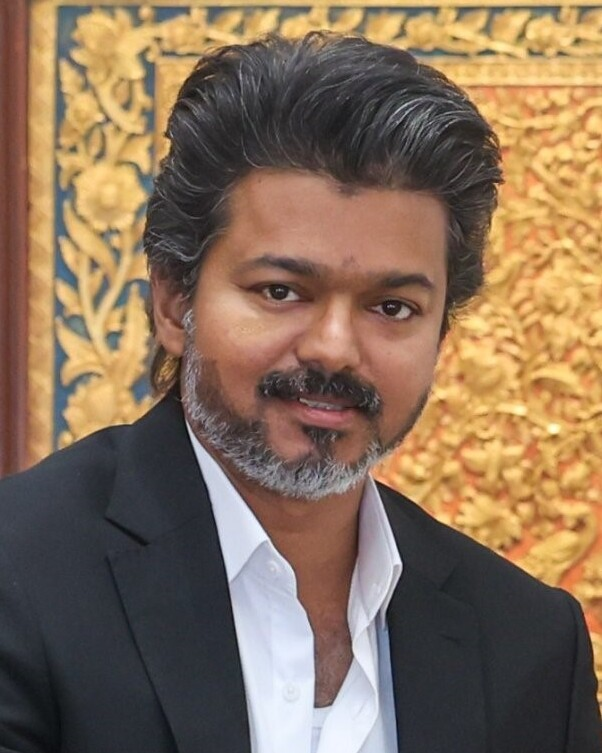
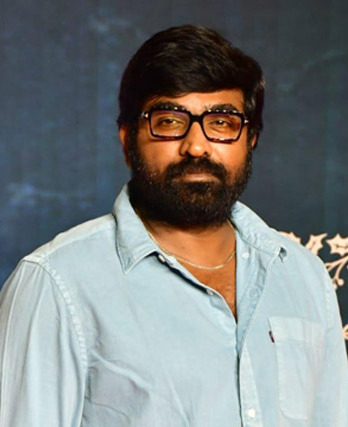
(left to right) Sivaji Ganesan, Rajinikanth, Kamal Haasan, C. Joseph Vijay and Vijay Sethupathi

Malayalam cinema
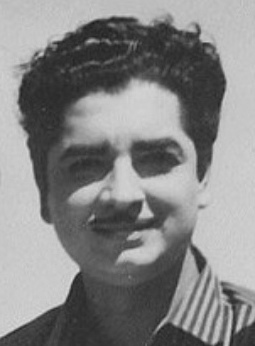
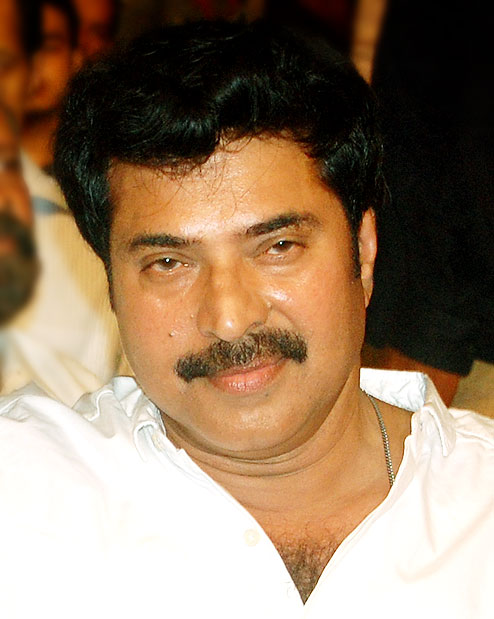
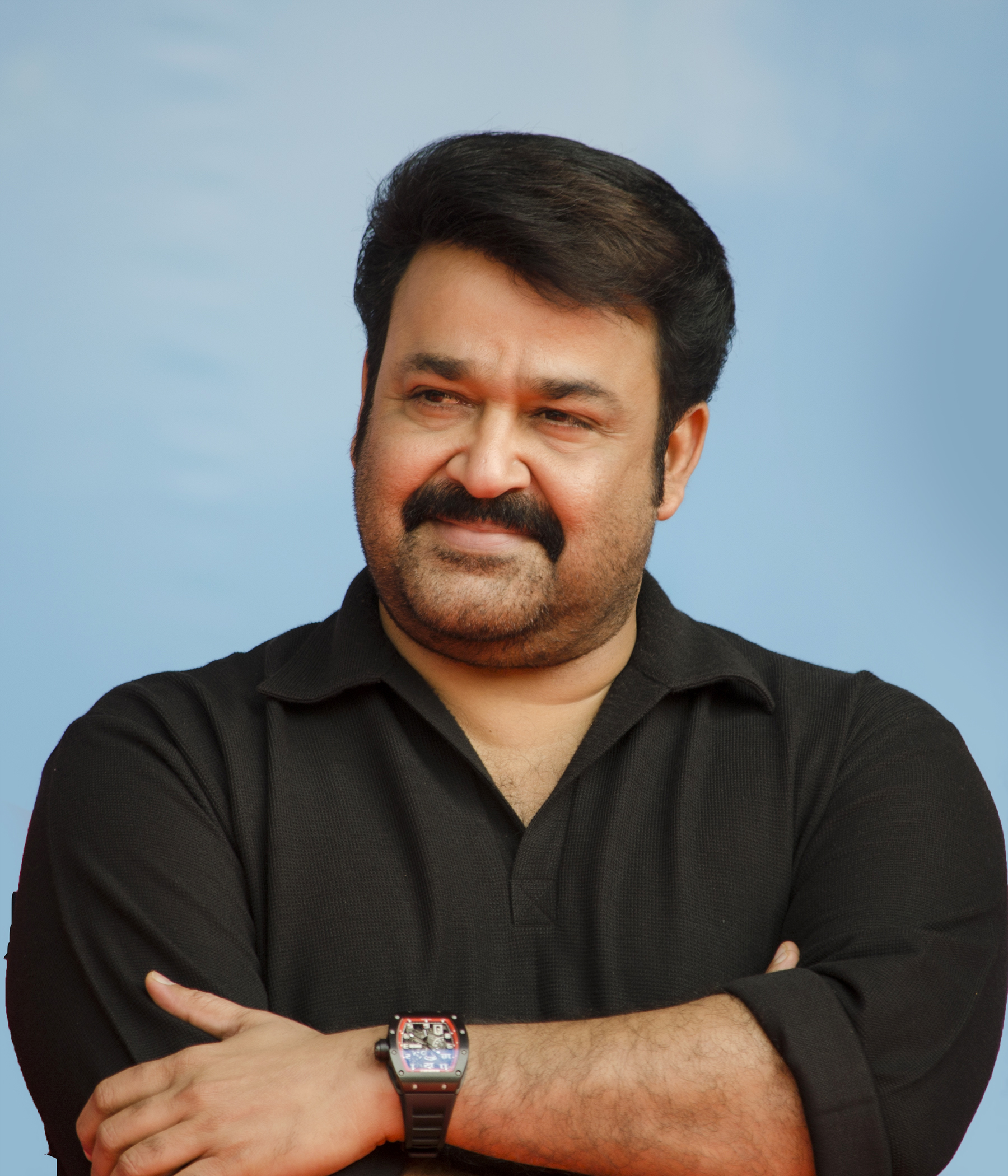
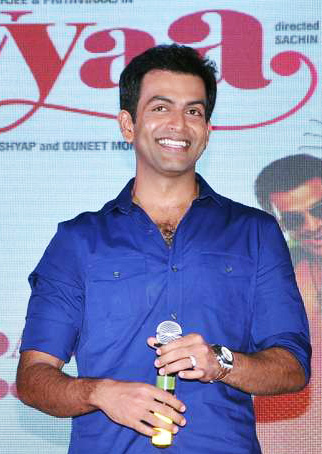
(left to right) Prem Nazir, Mammootty, Mohanlal, Prithviraj Sukumaran and Dulquer Salmaan

Kannada cinema
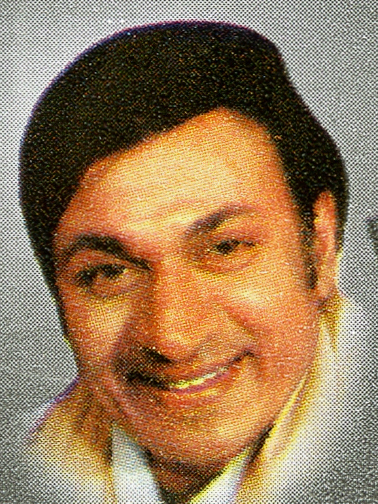
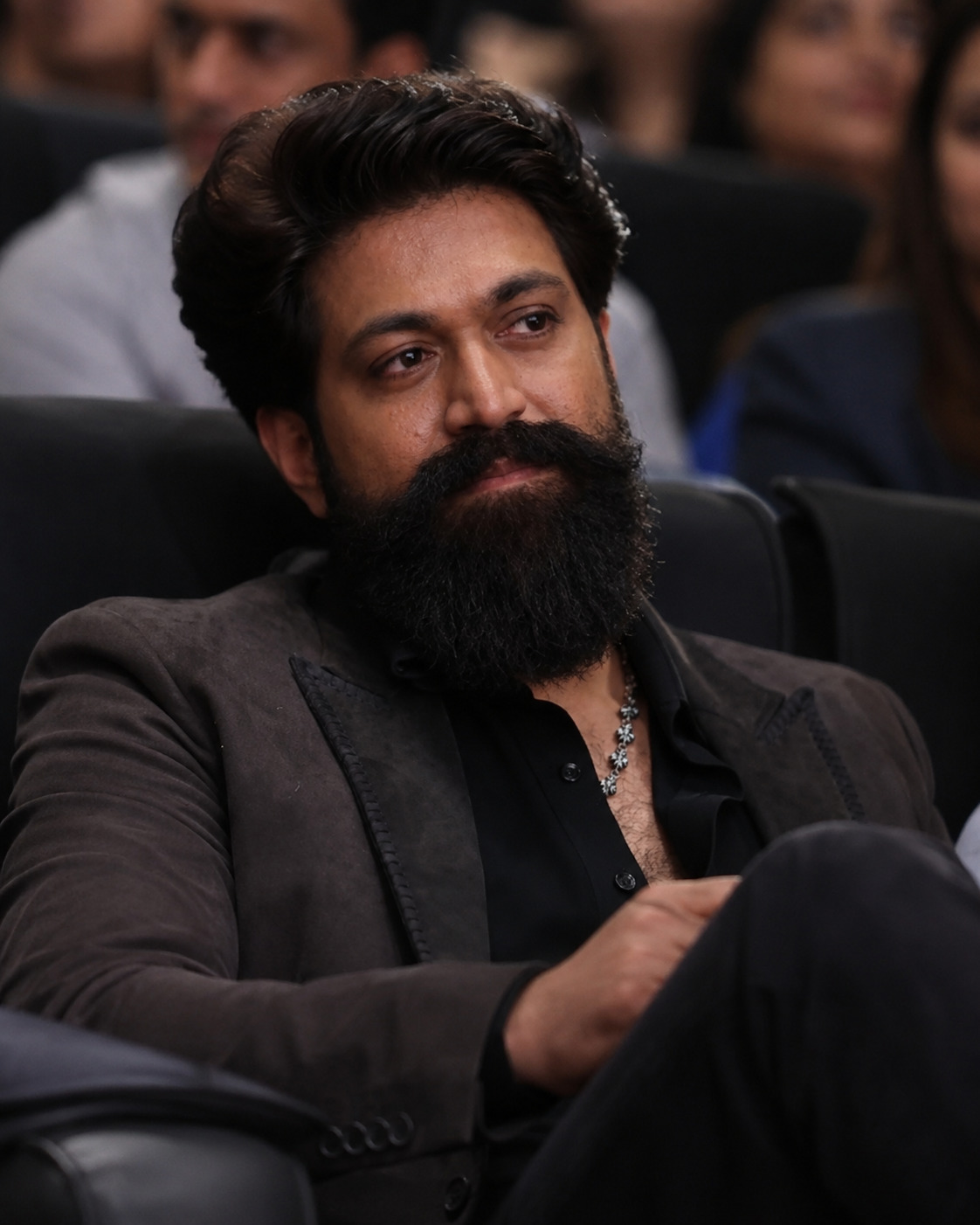
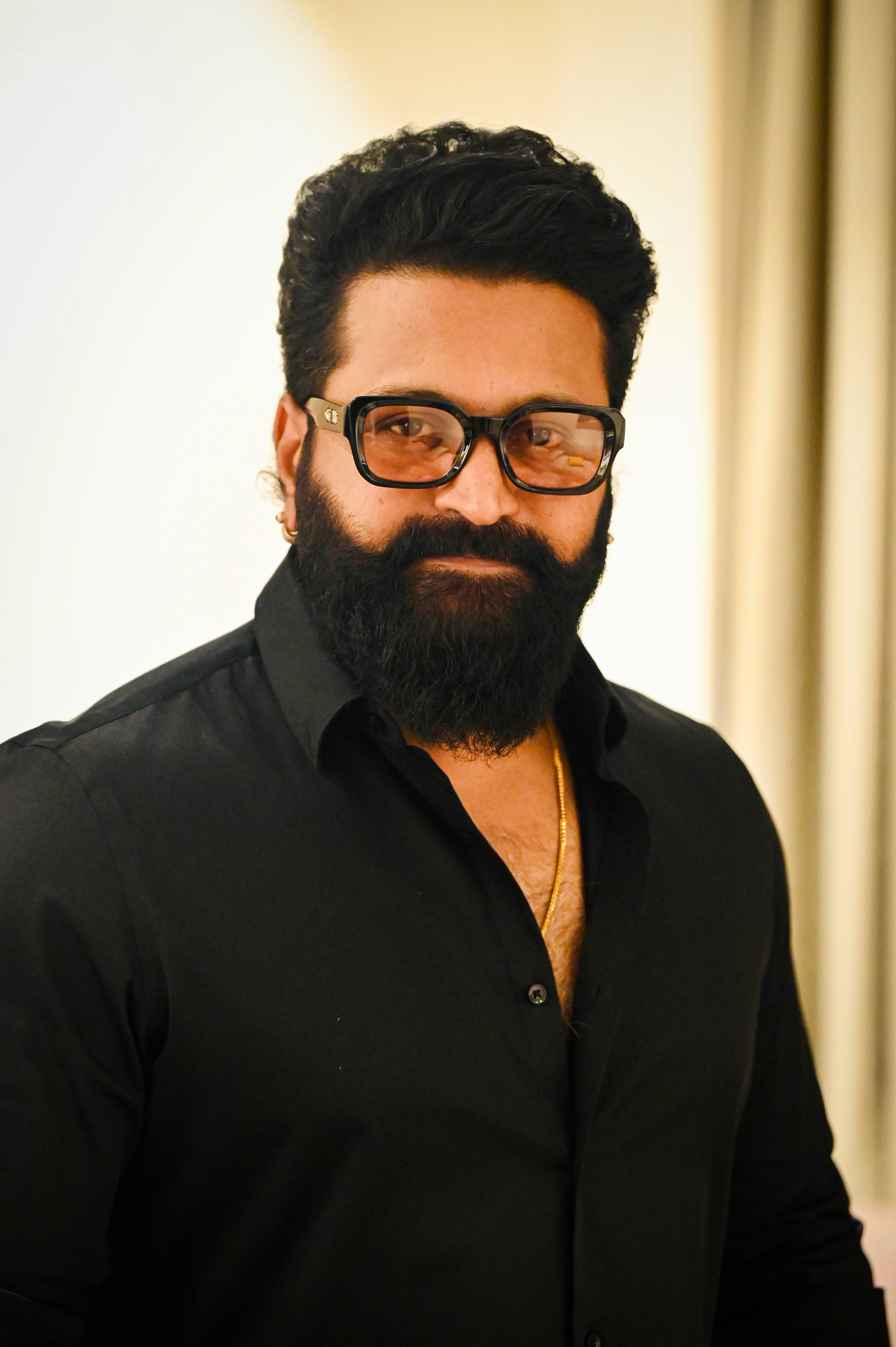
(left to right) Dr. Rajkumar, Vishnuvardhan, Puneeth, Yash and Rishab Shetty

Marathi cinema
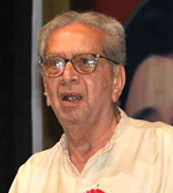
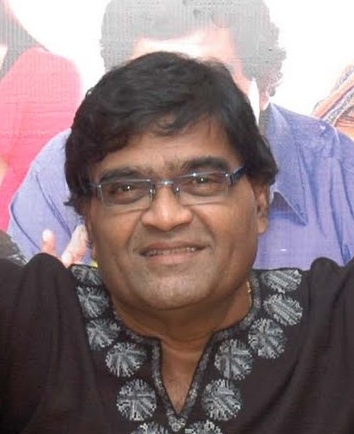
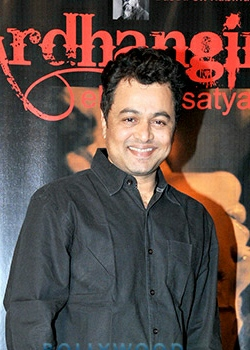
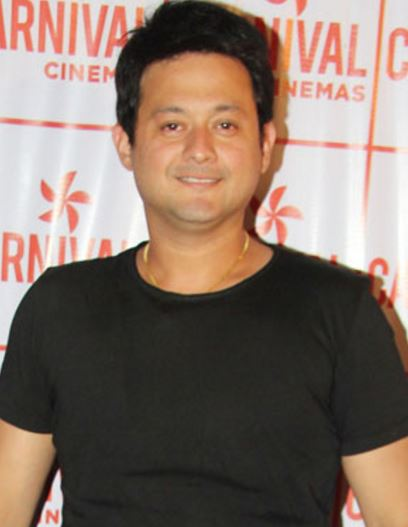
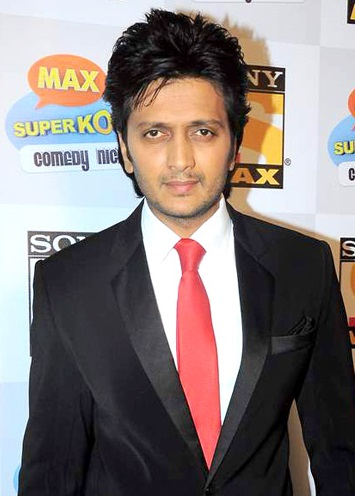
(left to right) Shreeram Lagoo, Ashok Saraf, Subodh Bhave, Swapnil Joshi and Riteish Deshmukh

Bengali cinema
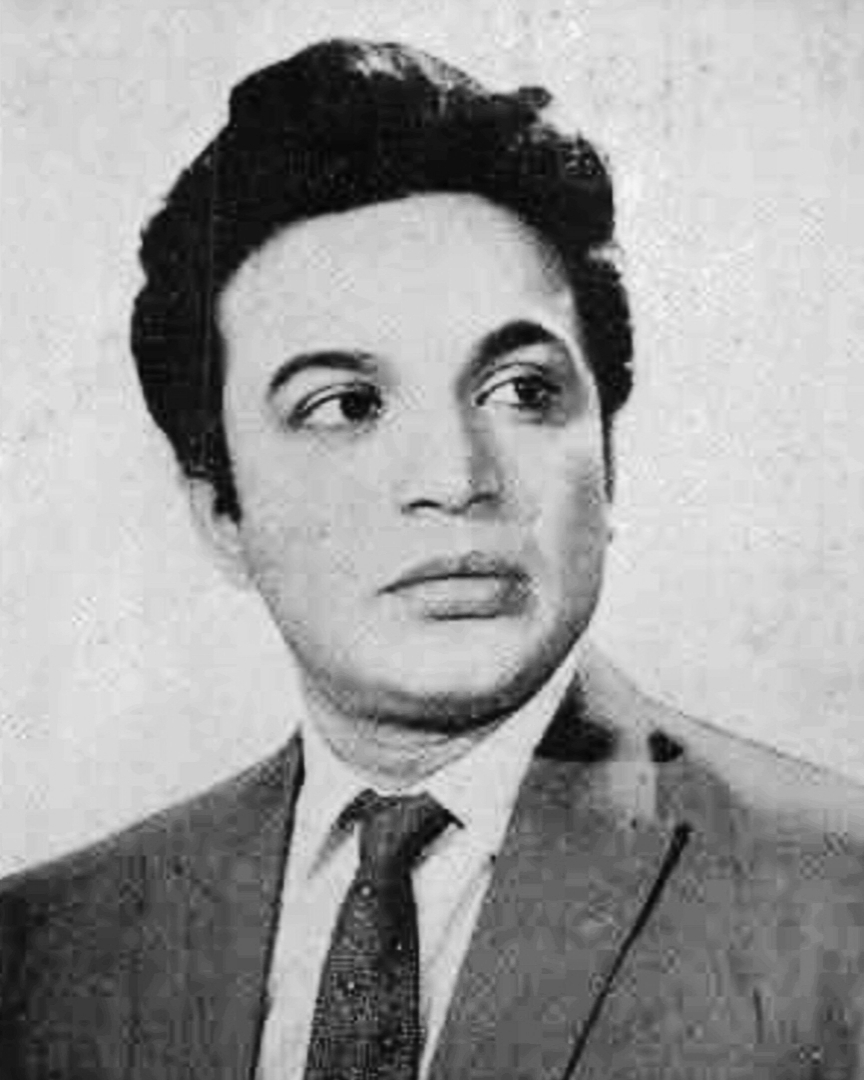
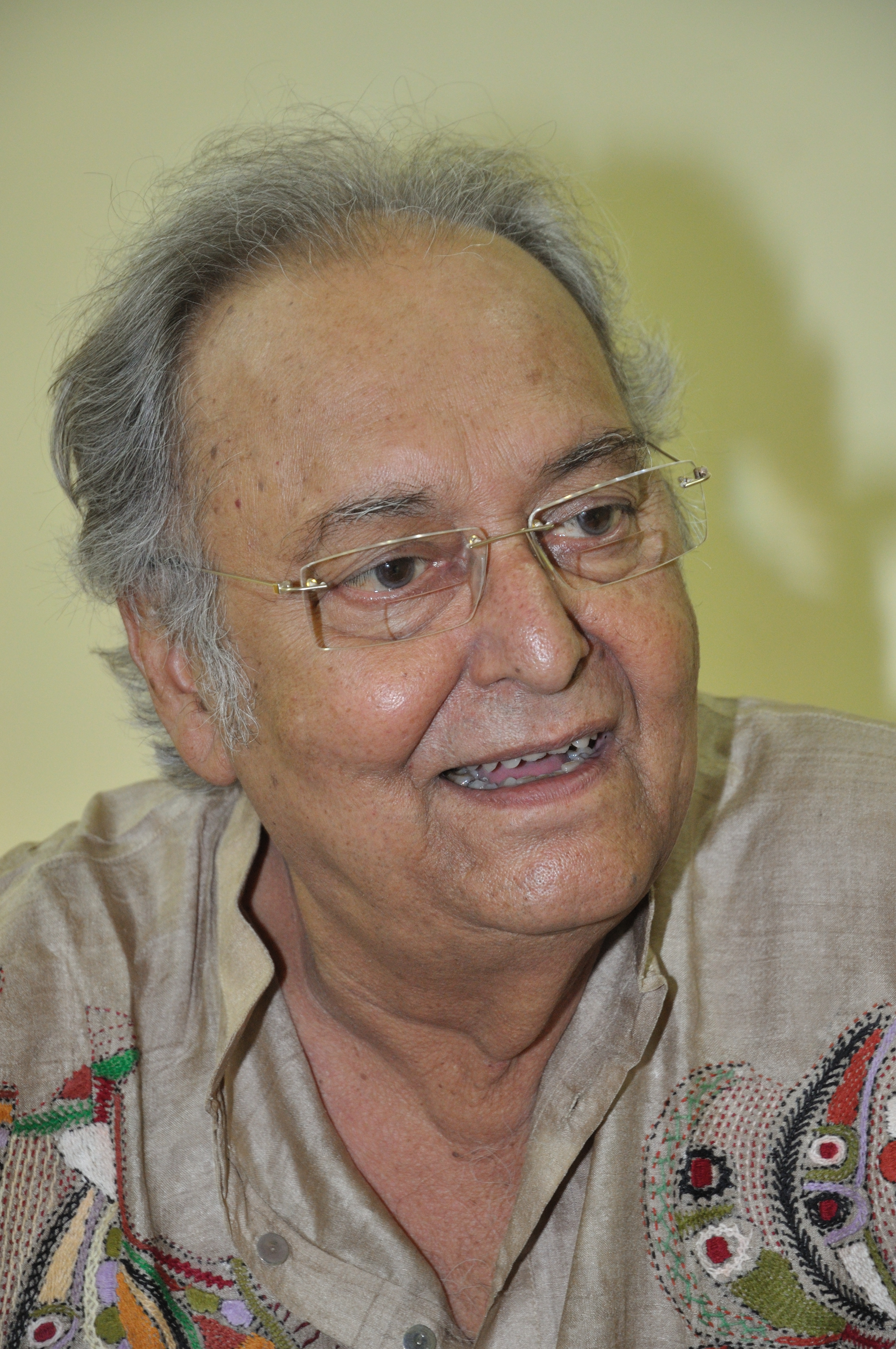
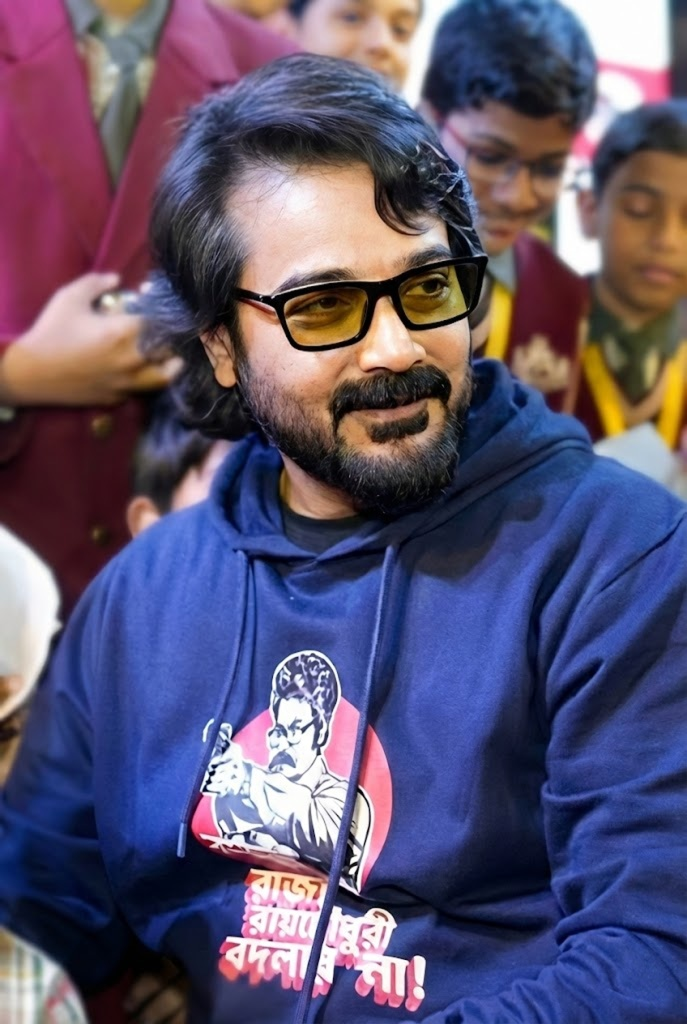
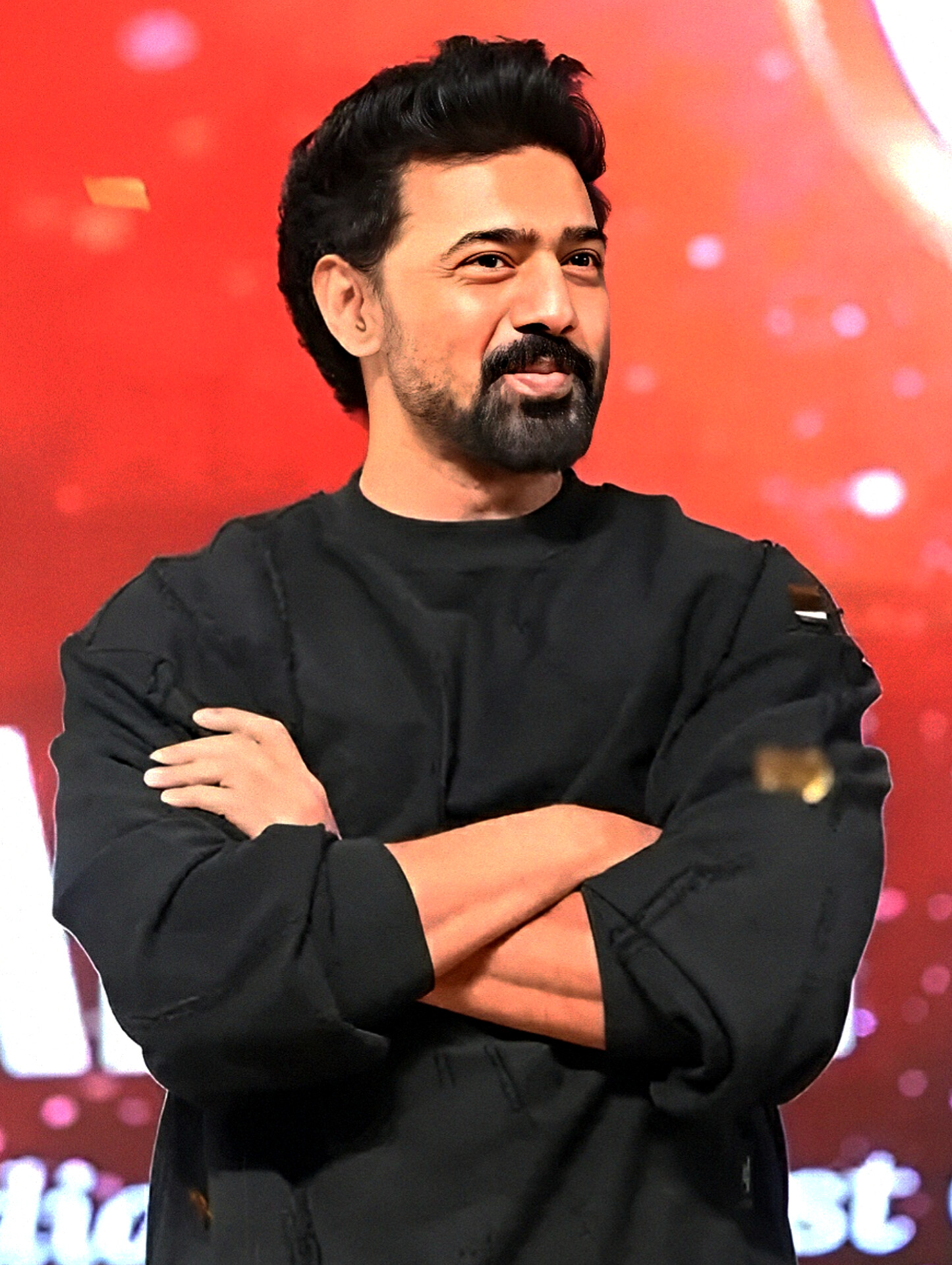
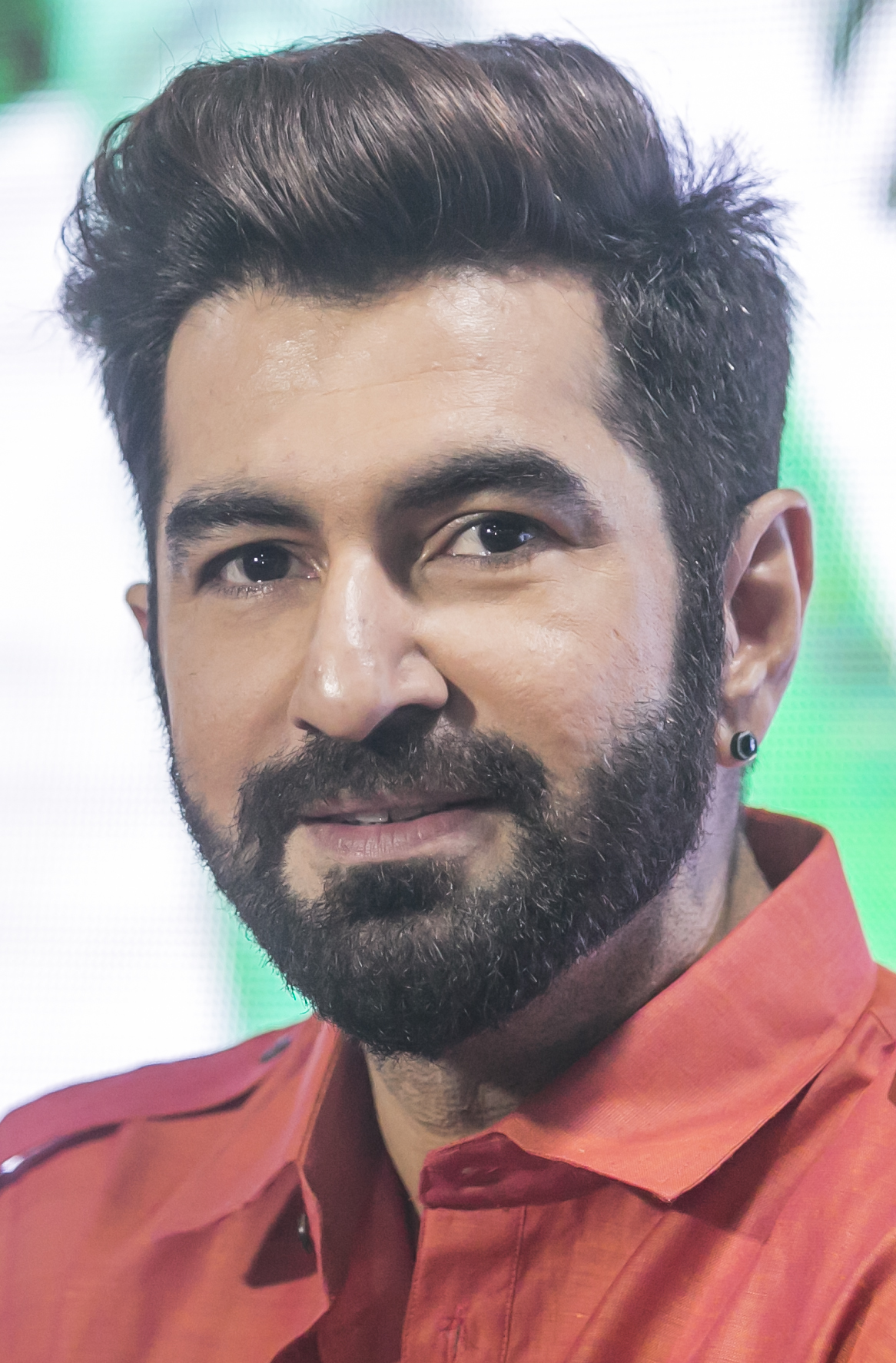
(left to right) Uttam Kumar, Soumitra Chatterjee, Prosenjit Chatterjee, Dev and Jeet

Punjabi cinema
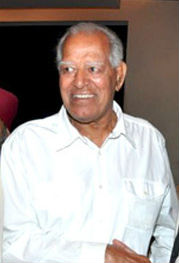
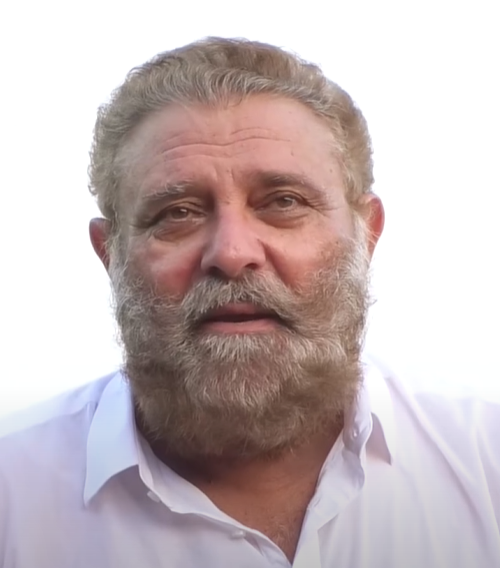
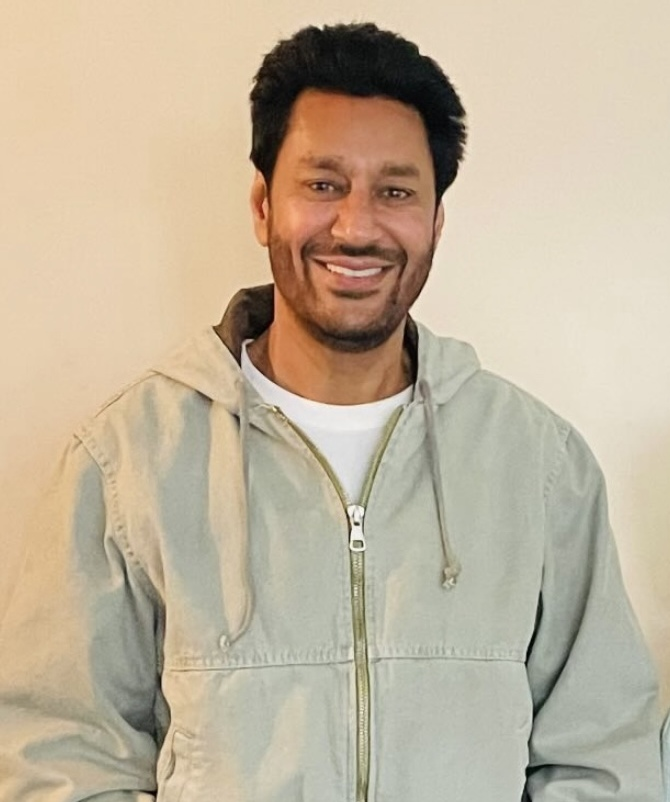
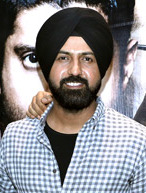
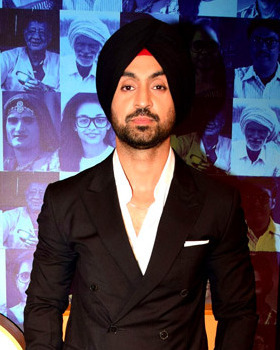
(left to right) Dara Singh, Yograj Singh, Harbhajan Mann, Gippy Grewal and Diljit Dosanjh

Indian cinema is composed of multilingual and multi-ethnic film art. In 2022, Hindi cinema represented 33% of box office revenue, followed by Telugu representing 20%, Tamil representing 16%, Kannada representing 8%, and Malayalam representing 6%. Other prominent film industries are Bengali, Marathi, Odia, Punjabi, Gujarati, Assamese and Bhojpuri cinema. This list comprises actors from all these industries across India.

== A ==
- Aadhi Pinisetty
- Aadi Saikumar
- Aamir Khan
- Aanjjan Srivastav
- Abbas
- Abhay Deol
- Abhijith
- Abhishek Bachchan
- Abhishek Banerjee
- Abhishek Chatterjee
- Abhimanyu Dassani
- Abhimanyu Singh
- Abijeet Duddala
- Abir Chatterjee
- Achyuth Kumar
- Adhyayan Suman
- Adil Hussain
- Aditya Babu
- Aditya Pancholi
- Aditya Lakhia
- Aditya Roy Kapur
- Aditya Seal
- Adoor Bhasi
- Aftab Shivdasani
- Ahuti Prasad
- Ajay
- Ajay Devgn
- Ajay Ghosh
- Ajay Rao
- Ajaz Khan
- Ajinkya Deo
- Ajit Khan
- Ajith Kumar
- Ajmal Ameer
- Aju Varghese
- A. K. Hangal
- Akkineni Akhil
- Akhilendra Mishra
- Akshay Anand
- Akshay Kumar
- Akshaye Khanna
- Akshay Oberoi
- Akul Balaji
- Ali Basha
- Ali Fazal
- Ali Zafar
- Allari Naresh
- Allu Arjun
- Allu Sirish
- Alok Nath
- Amar Talwar
- Ambareesh
- Amitabh Bachchan
- Amit Sadh
- Amit Sial
- Amjad Khan
- Ammy Virk
- Amol Palekar
- Amrish Puri
- Anand Tiwari
- Anant Nag
- Angad Bedi
- Anil Kapoor
- Aniruddha Jatkar
- Ankith Koyya
- Ankush Chaudhari
- Ankush Hazra
- Annu Kapoor
- Anoop Kumar
- Anoop Menon
- Anshuman Jha
- Anubhav Mohanty
- Anuj Gurwara
- Anupam Kher
- Anupam Sharma
- Anup Soni
- Anurag Kashyap
- Anwar Hussain
- Aparshakti Khurana
- Apurva Agnihotri
- Aravind Akash
- Arbaaz Khan
- Arif Zakaria
- Arjan Bajwa
- Arjun Kapoor
- Arjun Mathur
- Arjun Rampal
- Arjun Sarja
- Arshad Warsi
- Arun Sarnaik
- Arun Vijay
- Arunoday Singh
- Arvind Krishna
- Arvind Swamy
- Arya Babbar
- Arya Cethirakath
- Ashish Chaudhary
- Ashish Vidyarthi
- Ashok
- Ashok Kumar
- Asif Ali
- Asif Basra
- Asrani
- Ashok Saraf
- Ashok Selvan
- Ashutosh Rana
- Atharvaa
- Attakathi Dinesh
- Atul Agnihotri
- Atul Kulkarni
- Atul Parchure
- Auditya
- Avinash Tiwary
- Avinash
- Ayushmann Khurrana

== B ==
- B. C. Patil
- B. R. Panthulu
- Baburaj
- Babu Antony
- Balakrishna
- Balakrishna Nandamuri
- Balakrishna Valluri
- Balan K. Nair
- Balaraj
- Balraj Sahni
- Bank Janardhan
- Barun Sobti
- Benjamin Gilani
- Bhagwan Dada
- Bhanu Chander
- Bharat Bhushan
- Bharat Jadhav
- Bharath Gopi
- Bharath Srinivasan
- Bharathiraja
- Bank Janardhan
- Bijay Mohanty
- Bijon Bhattacharya
- Biju Menon
- Biju Phukan
- Biswajit Chatterjee
- Biswaroop Roy Chowdhury
- Bob Christo
- Bobby Deol
- Bobby Kottarakkara
- Bobby Simha
- Bonny Sengupta
- Boman Irani
- Brahmanandam
- Brijendra Kala
- Bullet Prakash

== C ==
- C. R. Simha
- Chandra Mohan (Hindi actor)
- Chandra Mohan (Telugu actor)
- Chandrachur Singh
- Chandrashekhar (actor)
- Charan Raj
- Charlie
- Charu Haasan
- Chetan Chandra
- Chetan Kumar
- Chetan Maddineni
- Chhabi Biswas
- Chi. Guru Dutt
- Chinni Jayanth
- Chikkanna
- Chiranjeevi Konidala
- Chiranjeevi Sarja
- Chunky Pandey
- Crazy Mohan
- Cyrus Broacha
- Cyrus Sahukar

== D ==
- Dada Kondke
- Dalip Tahil
- Danny Denzongpa
- Dara Singh
- Darshan (Kannada actor)
- Darshan (Tamil actor)
- Darsheel Safary
- Dattatreya
- David
- Deepak Dobriyal
- Deepak Tijori
- Dev (Bengali actor)
- Dev (Tamil actor)
- Dev Anand
- Dev Gill
- Devan
- Devaraj
- Deven Verma
- Dharmavarapu Subramanyam
- Dharmendra
- Dhanush
- Dheerendra Gopal
- Dhruva Sarja
- Diganta Hazarika
- Diganth
- Dinesh
- Dingri Nagaraj
- Dino Morea
- Dileep
- Diljit Dosanjh
- Dilip Kumar
- Dilip Prabhavalkar
- Dinesh Lal Yadav
- Divyang Thakkar
- Divyendu Sharma
- Doddanna
- Dulquer Salmaan
- Duniya Vijay
- Dwarakish

== E ==
- Emraan Hashmi
- Erick Avari

== F ==
- Fahadh Faasil
- Faisal Khan
- Fardeen Khan
- Farhan Akhtar
- Farooq Sheikh
- Faruk Kabir
- Fawad Khan
- Feroz Khan
- Fish Venkat

== G ==
- G. K. Govinda Rao
- G. V. Iyer
- Gajendra Chauhan
- Ganesh
- Ganesh Venkatraman
- Gangadhar
- Gaurav Chanana
- Gautham Karthik
- Gautham Vasudev Menon
- Gavie Chahal
- Gemini Ganesan
- Gippy Grewal
- Gireesh Sahedev
- Giri Babu
- Girish Karnad
- Girish Kumar Taurani
- Gopichand Lagadapati
- Gufi Paintal
- Gurmeet Choudhary
- Gopal Datt
- Goundamani
- Govinda
- Gubbi Veeranna
- Gulshan Devaiah
- Gulshan Grover
- Gummadi
- Gurdas Maan
- Guru Dutt
- Gurukiran
- Guruprasad

== H ==
- Hamsavardhan
- Harbhajan Mann
- Hardy Sandhu
- Harikrishna Nandamuri
- Harinam Singh
- Harish Kumar
- Harish Raj
- Harsh Mayar
- Harshad Chopda
- Harsh Varrdhan Kapoor
- Harshvardhan Rane
- Harisree Ashokan
- Harman Baweja
- Himansh Kohli
- Hiran Chatterjee
- Hiten Paintal
- Hiten Tejwani
- Hrithik Roshan
- Himesh Reshammiya
- Honnappa Bhagavathar
- Honnavalli Krishna
- Hunsur Krishnamurthy

== I ==
- I. S. Johar
- Iftekar
- Imaad Shah
- Imran Abbas Naqvi
- Imran Hasnee
- Imran Khan
- Inder Kumar
- Indrajith Sukumaran
- Indrans
- Inderpal Singh
- Innocent Vincent
- Irrfan Khan
- Inaamulhaq
- Ishaan Khattar
- Ivan Rodriguez

== J ==
- J. P. Chandrababu
- J. V. Somayajulu
- Jaaved Jaffrey
- Jackie Shroff
- Jackky Bhagnani
- Jagadish
- Jagapati Babu
- Jagathy Sreekumar
- Jagdeep
- Jagdish Raj
- Jaggesh
- Jai
- Jaideep Ahlawat
- Jaishankar
- Jai Akash
- Jai Jagadish
- Jameel Khan
- Jaspal Bhatti
- Jatin Bora
- Javed Sheikh
- Jaya Prakash Reddy
- Jayadev Mohan
- Jayam Ravi
- Jayan
- Jayant
- Jayaram
- Jayram Karthik
- Jayasurya
- Jeet
- Jeetendra
- Jeeva
- Jeevan
- Jiiva
- Jim Sarbh
- Jimmy Shergill
- Jisshu Sengupta
- Jitendra Kumar
- Jithan Ramesh
- Joe Simon
- John Abraham
- Johnny Lever
- Johnny Walker
- Vijay (actor)
- Joy Mukherjee
- Jugal Hansraj

== K ==
- K. Bhagyaraj
- K. L. Saigal
- K. N. Singh
- K. S. Ashwath
- Kabir Bedi
- Kader Khan
- Kaikala Satyanarayana
- Kalabhavan Mani
- Kalyan Kumar
- Kalyan Ram
- Kamaal Rashid Khan
- Kamal Haasan
- Kapil Bora
- Kapil Sharma
- Karan
- Karan Johar
- Karan Kapoor
- Karan Kundra
- Karan Nath
- Karan Singh Grover
- Karan Wahi
- Karibasavaiah
- Karthi
- Karthik
- Kartik Aaryan
- Kartikeya Gummakonda
- Karunas
- Kashinath
- Kashinath Ghanekar
- Kay Kay Menon
- Kayoze Irani
- Keerthiraj
- Kemparaj Urs
- Keshto Mukherjee
- Khayyum Basha
- Khesari Lal Yadav
- Kiku Sharda
- Kiran Kumar
- Kishan Shrikanth
- Kishore
- Kishore Kumar
- Komal Kumar
- Kona Venkat
- Kota Srinivasa Rao
- Krishna (Kannada actor)
- Krishna (Telugu actor)
- Krishnam Raju
- Krishnudu
- Krushna Abhishek
- Kulbhushan Kharbanda
- Kumar Bangarappa
- Kumar Gaurav
- Kumar Govind
- Kumud Mishra
- Kunaal Roy Kapur
- Kunal Singh
- Kunal Kapoor (born 1959)
- Kunal Kapoor (born 1977)
- Kunal Khemu
- Kunchacko Boban
- Kunigal Nagabhushan
- Kuthiravattam Pappu

== L ==
- Lavrenti Lopes
- Lawrence Raghavendra
- Laxmikant Berde
- Lekh Tandon
- Lohithaswa
- Lokesh
- Loknath
- Lucky Ali
- Luv Sinha

== M ==
- Manav Kaul
- M. B. Shetty
- M. G. Ramachandran
- M. G. Soman
- M. K. Raina
- M. K. Thyagaraja Bhagavathar
- M. N. Nambiar
- M. P. Shankar
- M. S. Narayana
- M. V. Vasudeva Rao
- Mac Mohan
- Madan Puri
- Madhu
- Mahendra Sandhu
- Mahesh Babu
- Mahesh Manjrekar
- Mahesh Kothare
- Makrand Deshpande
- Malaysia Vasudevan
- Mammootty
- Mamik Singh
- Mandeep Roy
- Manish Chaudhary
- Mani Damodara Chakyar
- Mani Madhava Chakyar
- Manikuttan
- Manish Raisinghani
- Manivannan
- Manjot Singh
- Manna Dey
- Manish Paul
- Manoj Bajpai
- Manoj Joshi
- Manoj K. Jayan
- Manoj Kumar
- Manoj Manchu
- Manoj Tiger
- Manoj Tiwari
- Master Hirannaiah
- Master Manjunath
- Master Vinayak
- Mehar Mittal
- Mehmood
- Meiyang Chang
- Michael Madhu
- Milind Soman
- Mimoh Chakraborty
- Mithun Chakraborty
- Mithun Tejaswi
- Mohammed Zeeshan Ayub Khan
- Mohan Agashe
- Mohan Babu
- Mohanlal
- Mohan Joshi
- Mohan Rao
- Mohan Shankar
- Mohit Madaan
- Mohit Raina
- Mohnish Behl
- Motilal
- Mukesh
- Mukesh Khanna
- Mukesh Tiwari
- Mukkamala
- Mukri
- Mukhyamantri Chandru
- Mukul Dev
- Murali Krishna
- Murali Mohan
- Murali Siddalingaiah
- Mysore Lokesh

== N ==
- N. S. Krishnan
- N. T. Rama Rao
- N. T. Rama Rao Jr.
- Nandish Sandhu
- Naga Chaitanya
- Naga Kiran
- Nagarjuna Akkineni
- Nagesh
- Nagendra Babu
- Nagendra Prasad
- Nageswara Rao Akkineni
- Nagayya V.
- Nagineedu
- Nakul Roshan Sahdev
- Namit Das
- Namit Shah
- Nana Patekar
- Nani
- Narain
- Narasimharaju
- Narasimharaju
- Narendra Prasad
- Naresh
- Naseeruddin Shah
- Nassar
- Navdeep
- Naveen Kasturia
- Naveen Polishetty
- Navin Prabhakar
- Nawazuddin Siddiqui
- Nazir Hussain
- Nedumudi Venu
- Neeraj Kabi
- Negro Johnny
- Neil Bhatt
- Neil Nitin Mukesh
- Nikhil Gowda
- Nikhil Siddharth
- Nikitin Dheer
- Nilu Phule
- Ninad Kamat
- Nipon Goswami
- Nithin
- Nivin Pauly

== O ==
- Omkar Kapoor
- Oduvil Unnikrishnan
- Om Prakash
- Om Puri
- Om Shivpuri
- Omi Vaidya

== P ==
- Pankaj Dheer
- Pankaj Kapoor
- Pankaj Tripathi
- Parambrata Chatterjee
- Paresh Rawal
- Parikshit Sahni
- Parmeet Sethi
- Parvin Dabas
- Parzan Dastur
- Pasupathy
- Pawan Kalyan
- Pawan Singh
- Pinchoo Kapoor
- Piyush Mishra
- Prabal Panjabi
- Prabhas
- Prabhu Deva
- Prabhu
- Pradeep Kumar
- Pradeep Pandey
- Pradeep Rawat
- Prajwal Devaraj
- Prakash Raj
- Pran
- Pranav Mohanlal
- Prasadbabu
- Prasanna
- Prasenjit Chatterjee
- Prashant Damle
- Prashanta Nanda
- Prashanth Thyagarajan
- Prateik Babbar
- Prathap
- Prem
- Prem Chopra
- Prem Kumar
- Prem Nath
- Prem Nazir
- Prithviraj Ballireddy
- Prithviraj Kapoor
- Prithviraj Sukumaran
- Priyanshu Painyuli
- Pu La Deshpande
- Pulkit Samrat
- Puneet Issar
- Puneet Rajkumar
- Puri Jagannadh

== R ==
- R. Madhavan
- R. Nagendra Rao
- R. Nageshwara Rao
- Raaj Kumar
- Raghav Juyal
- Raghavan
- Raghavendra Rajkumar
- Raghu Babu
- Raghu Mukherjee
- Raghubir Yadav
- Raghuvaran
- Rahman
- Rahul Roy
- Rahul Bose
- Rahul Dev
- Raja Shankar
- Raj Babbar
- Raj Kapoor
- Rajanala
- Rajanand
- Rajesh Sharma, born 1971
- Rajesh Sharma, born 1973
- Rajkummar Rao
- Rajkumar Patra
- Rajat Barmecha
- Rajendra Gupta
- Rajendra Kumar
- Rajendra Nath
- Rajesh (Kala Thapaswi)
- Rajesh Khanna
- Rajesh Khattar
- Rajesh Krishnan
- Rajit Kapoor
- Rajinikanth
- Ram Kapoor
- Rajeev Verma
- Rajiv Kanakala
- Rajiv Kapoor
- Rajkumar
- Rajneesh Duggal
- Rajpal Yadav
- Raju Srivastav
- Rakesh Bedi
- Rakesh Roshan
- Ramakrishna
- Ramki
- Ram Charan Teja
- Ramesh Aravind
- Ramesh Babu
- Ramesh Bhat
- Ramesh Deo
- Ramesh Khanna
- Ram Kumar
- Ram Pothineni
- Rana Daggubati
- Ranbir Kapoor
- Randeep Hooda
- Randhir Kapoor
- Ranjeet
- Ranveer Singh
- Ranvir Shorey
- Ravi Babu
- Ravi Kishan
- Ravi Prakash
- Ravi Sarma
- Ravi Shankar
- Ravi Teja
- Ravichandran
- Ravichandran Veeraswamy
- Raza Murad
- Richard Rishi
- Rishi Kapoor
- Riteish Deshmukh
- Riyaz Khan
- Rockline Venkatesh
- Rocky Rupkumar Patra
- Rohit Roy
- Ronit Roy
- Roshan Seth

== S ==
- S. Narayan
- S Sathyendra
- S. J. Suryah
- S. P. Balasubrahmanyam
- S. P. B. Charan
- S. Shankar
- S. V. Ranga Rao
- Saandip
- Sachin Pilgaonkar
- Sachin Khedekar
- Sadhu Kokila
- Saeed Jaffrey
- Sahil Khan
- Sahil Shroff
- Sahil Vaid
- Sai Kumar
- Sai Kumar
- Saif Ali Khan
- Sai Dharam Tej
- Sajid Khan
- Sajjad Delafrooz
- Saleem Kumar
- Salim Khan
- Salman Khan
- Sameer Dattani
- Samir Kochhar
- Samir Soni
- Sampath
- Sampath Raj
- Sandeep Kulkarni
- Sanjay Dutt
- Sanjay Kapoor
- Sanjay Khan
- Sanjay Mishra
- Sanjay Suri
- Sanjeev Bhaskar
- Sanjeev Kumar
- Sanjeev Tyagi
- Sankaradi
- Sanketh Kashi
- Santhanam
- Sapru
- Saqib Saleem
- Sarath Babu
- Sarath Kumar
- Sarfaraz Khan
- Sarigama Viji
- Sathyaraj
- Sathyan Nadar
- Sathyan Sivakumar
- Satish Shah
- Sathish Ninasam
- Satyajeet Puri
- Sathyajith
- Saurabh Shukla
- Sayaji Shinde
- Sayak Chakraborty
- Senthil
- Shaad Randhawa
- Shaam
- Shaan
- Shabir Ahluwalia
- Shahid Kapoor
- Shah Rukh Khan
- Shammi Kapoor
- Shani Mahadevappa
- Shankar
- Shankar Nag
- Shanthanu Bhagyaraj
- Sharad Kelkar
- Sharad Talwalkar
- Sharman Joshi
- Sharat Saxena
- Sharath Babu
- Sharath Kumar
- Sharath Lohitashwa
- Sharman Joshi
- Shashank shende
- Shashi Kapoor
- Shashikumar
- Shatrughan Sinha
- Shehzad Khan
- Shekhar Suman
- Shiny Ahuja
- Shirish Kunder
- Shivkumar Subramaniam
- Shivam Patil
- Shivarajkumar
- Shobraj
- Shreela Ghosh
- Shreyas Talpade
- Shriram Lagoo
- Sibiraj
- Siddhant Chaturvedi
- Sidhant Gupta
- Sidharth Malhotra
- Sidharth Shukla
- Siddhanta Mahapatra
- Siddharth Koirala
- Siddharth Narayan
- Siddharth Nigam
- Sikandar Kher
- Silambarasan Rajendar
- Sihi Kahi Chandru
- Sikandar Kher
- Siva Reddy
- Sivaji Ganesan
- Sivakarthikeyan
- Sivakumar
- Sobhan Babu
- Sohail Khan
- Soham Chakraborty
- Sohrab Modi
- Sonu Nigam
- Sonu Sood
- Sooraj Pancholi
- Sparsh Shrivastava
- Sreenivasan
- Sri Murali
- Sridhar
- Srihari
- Srikanth Krishnamachari
- Srikanth Meka
- Sriman
- Srinagar Kitty
- Srinath
- Srinivasa Murthy
- Srinivasa Reddy
- Sriram Panda
- Srujan Lokesh
- Subbaraju
- Subbaraya Sharma
- Subrat Dutta
- Suchindra Bali
- Sudeepa
- Sudheer
- Subodh Bhave
- Sudheer Babu
- Sudhir Dalvi
- Sujan Mukhopadhyay
- Sukumaran
- Suman Setty
- Suman Talwar
- Sumanth
- Sumeet Raghavan
- Sundar Krishna Urs
- Sundar Raj
- Sundeep Kishan
- Suneil Anand
- Sunil
- Sunil Dutt
- Sunil Grover
- Sunil Raoh
- Sunil Shetty
- Sunil Varma
- Sunny Deol
- Sunny Gill
- Sunny Singh
- Suresh
- Suresh Gopi
- Suresh Heblikar
- Suresh Joachim
- Suresh Menon
- Suresh Oberoi
- Surya Sivakumar
- Suryakant Mandhare
- Sushant Singh Rajput
- Sushanth
- Suthivelu
- Sutti Veerabhadra Rao
- Swwapnil Joshi

== T ==
- Tabla Nani
- Taher Shabbir
- Tahir Raj Bhasin
- Tanay Chheda
- Tanikella Bharani
- Tapas Paul
- Taraka Ratna
- Tarun Arora
- Tarun Chandra
- Tarun Kumar
- Tathagata Mukherjee
- Thagubothu Ramesh
- Thikkurissy Sukumaran Nair
- Thilakan
- Thalaivasal Vijay
- Tiger Shroff
- Tinnu Anand
- Tiku Talsania
- Tigmanshu Dhulia
- Tom Alter
- Tottempudi Gopichand
- Tusshar Kapoor
- Tushar Pandey

== U ==
- Uday Chopra
- Uday Kiran
- Udaykumar
- Unni Mukundan
- Upen Patel
- Upendra
- Upendra Limaye
- Utkarsh Sharma
- Utpal Dutt
- Uttam Kumar
- Uttam Mohanty

== V ==
- Vadivelu
- Vajramuni
- Varun Dhawan
- Varun Kapoor
- Varun Tej
- Varun Sandesh
- Varun Sharma
- Veeru Devgan
- Venkatesh
- Vennela Kishore
- Venu Madhav
- Vicky Kaushal
- Vidharth
- Vidyut Jammwal
- Vijay Arora
- Vijay Chandrasekhar
- Vijay Deverakonda
- Vijay Duniya
- Vijay Raaz
- Vijay Raghavendra
- Vijay Sethupathi
- Vijayakanth
- Vijayakumar
- Vijayaraghavan
- Vijay Antony
- Vijay Kashi
- Vijay Varma
- Vikas Kalantri
- Vikas Sethi
- Vikram Gokhale
- Vikram Kennedy
- Vikram Prabhu
- Vikram Singh Chauhan
- Vikrant Massey
- Vikranth
- Vimal
- Vinay Apte
- Vinay Pathak
- Vinay Rai
- Vinay Rajkumar
- Vinayak Joshi
- Vindu Dara Singh
- Vineeth
- Vineet Kumar
- Vineeth Sreenivasan
- Vinod Khanna
- Vinod Mehra
- Vipin Sharma
- Vir Das
- Vishal Jethwa
- Vishal Krishna
- Vishal Karwal
- Vishnu Manchu
- Vishnu Vishal
- Vishnuvardhan
- Vishwadev Rachakonda
- Vivaan Shah
- Vivek
- Vivek Oberoi
- Vivek Mushran
- Vrajesh Hirjee
- VTV Ganesh
- Vishwanath Kulkarni

== Y ==
- Yash
- Yash Dasgupta
- Yash Pandit
- Yashpal Sharma
- Yash Tandon
- Yash Tonk
- Yatin Karyekar
- Yogesh
- Yugendran
- Yugi Sethu
- Yuva Rajkumar

== Z ==
- Zayed Khan
- Zeishan Quadri
- Zubeen Garg
- Zulfi Syed

== See also ==
- List of Bhojpuri actors
- List of Bhojpuri actresses
- List of Hindi film actors
- List of Hindi film actresses
- List of Indian film actresses
- List of Indian television actors
- List of Tamil film actors
- List of Tamil film actresses
- List of Marathi film actors
- List of Marathi film actresses
- Lists of actors
