= Aati Kya Khandala =

Hindi Song

Song by Aamir Khan, Alka Yagnik

from the album Ghulam
- Language: Hindi (Note: Sung with a strong Bombay Hindi accent.)
- Released: March 8, 1998
- Genre: Soundtrack
- Length: 2:50
- Label: Tips Industries
- Composer: Jatin–Lalit
- Lyricist: Nitin Raikwar

Music video
- Aati Kya Khandala on YouTube

"Aati Kya Khandala" (transl. Will you come to Khandala) is a 1998 Hindi song sung by Indian actor Aamir Khan in his singing debut, along with playback singer Alka Yagnik. The music was composed by Jatin–Lalit for the soundtrack of the 1998 Hindi film Ghulam, featuring lyrics penned by Nitin Raikwar.

== About the song ==
In the film, Alisha (Rani Mukerji) is upset after a fight with her father. Her friend and lover Sidhu (Aamir Khan) tries to cheer her up by singing the song "Aati Kya Khandala". Literally, the song is a request to come to Khandala, a scenic holiday location near Mumbai, the city where the film is not situated.

The song was sung by Aamir Khan and Alka Yagnik.

== Reception and impact ==
The song became an instant hit and is one of Bollywood's most popular songs ever.

The song was also the first in a spate of songs sung by actors in Bollywood movies, and was the inspiration for many of these, including "Apun Bola" sung by Shah Rukh Khan for Josh, also written by Nitin Raikwar. In more recent times, it was rumored that Dhoom 3 would feature a song sung by Aamir Khan in the vein of "Aati Kya Khandala".

The song "Aati Kya Khandala" has also been blamed for eve-teasing (a term used in India for minor forms of sexual harassment, usually verbal, carried out in public) as eve-teasers have been reported to sing the song as part of eve-teasing.

== In popular culture ==
The song was used in the 2001 film Kabhi Khushi Kabhi Gham.
