= List of singing actors in Indian cinema =

Singing actors in Indian cinema are Indian film actors who do their own singing.

Since the 1950s, most songs in films produced by the various regional Indian cinema industries have been sung by playback singers; the actors who appear to be singing and dancing are only lip-synching the words.

In the earliest years of Indian cinema, actors were more likely to be singers and to leave the dancing to specialists who appeared in what are called "item numbers." Stars such as Kishore Kumar, K. L. Saigal, Suraiyya, and Noor Jehan were known as both singers and actors. However, in the 1950s and 1960s, producers and directors increasingly tended to hire actors who could dance and leave the singing to playback singers. Puneeth Rajkumar was one of the actors in Kannada Movie Industry who is famous for both singing and acting.

== List ==
- Puneeth Rajkumar
- Madhubala, sang in the films Basant (1942) and Pujari (1946) for herself.
- Diljit Dosanjh, both a singer and an actor in Hindi and Punjabi cinema.
- Rajkumar, received a national award for singing the song "Naadamaya Ee Lokavella" in the movie Jeevana Chaitra.
- Meena Kumari, sang in films like Duniya Ek Sarai, Piya Ghar Aaja, Bichchade Balam and one song in Pinjre Ke Panchhi (1966). She also gave voice to her poems in the album I Write, I Recite (1971)
- Vyjayanthimala, sang "Bol Radha Bol" in Sangam and "Cheye Thaki Cheye Thaki" in Hatey Bazarey.
- Abhay Deol, sang in Zindagi Na Milegi Dobara.
- Ajay Devgan, sang in Bol Bachchan.
- Alia Bhatt, sang "Samjhawan Unplugged" in Humpty Sharma Ki Dulhania, "Sooha Saaha" in Highway, "Ikk Kudi (Club Mix)" in Udta Punjab and "Love you Zindagi (Club Mix)" in Dear Zindagi.
- Amitabh Bachchan, sang "Mere Angane Mein" in Lawaaris and has also sung in Silsila, Mahaan, Toofan, Baghban, Kabhi Khushi Kabhie Gham, Bhoothnath, Mr. Natwarlal, "Bbuddah... Hoga Terra Baap", "Delhi-6", "Aladin", Bol Bachchan and Baabul.
- Aamir Khan, sang Aati Kya Khandala in Ghulam, Bum Bum Bole in Taare Zameen Par, I Hate You in Delhi Belly and Dhaakad in Dangal.
- Amrish Puri, sang "Shom Shom Shom" in Tahalka.
- Abhishek Bachchan, sang a rap song in Rohan Sippy's film Bluffmaster! and Bol Bachchan.
- Farhan Akhtar, sang all the songs of movie Rock On!!, one song in movie Zindagi Na Milegi Dobara, "Dil Dhadakne Do" title song and many more.
- Hrithik Roshan, sang in "Zindagi Na Milegi Dobara", "Kites", "Guzaarish"
- Hema Malini, sang "Peene Wale Ko Peene Ka Bahana" with Kishore Kumar in Haath Ki Safai.
- Parineeti Chopra, sang "Maana Ke Hum Yaar Nahin" in Meri Pyaari Bindu, "Teri Mitti" in Kesari.
- Priyanka Chopra, sang "In My City", "Exotic", "Can't Make You Love Me", "Dil Dhadakne Do" title song, "Erase", "Meltdown".
- Shahrukh Khan sang "Apun Bola" in Josh, "Jab Tak Hai Jaan Poem" in Jab Tak Hai Jaan and "Happy New Year".
- Shraddha Kapoor, sang "Galliyan Unplugged" in Ek Villain, "Do Jahaan" in Haider, "Bezubaan Phir Se" in ABCD 2, "Sab Tera" in Baaghi and "Phir Bhi Tumko Chanhungi" in Half Girlfriend.
- Salman Khan, sang "Chandi Ki Daal Par" in Hello Brother, "Main Hoon Yuvvraaj" in Yuvvraaj, "Most Wanted Track" in Wanted, "Bodyguard" in Bodyguard, "Hangover" in Kick, "Main Hoon Hero Tera" in Hero and others.
- Sanjay Dutt, sang Chal Mere Bhai, and "Giri Giri" in Aladin.
- Madhuri Dixit, sang Kaahe Chedd in Devdas (2002)
- Juhi Chawla, sang in Bhoothnath along with Amitabh Bachchan.
- Mithun Chakraborty, sang "Aaj Mujhe Peene De" in Ilaaka (1989).
- Sridevi, sang O Meri Chandni in Chandni (1989).
- Kamal Haasan, sang many numbers in his films. Lately, he has sung three songs in Vishwaroopam. Another famous hit song of his would-be Kaasu Melae Kaasu Vanthu from Kaathala Kaathala in which he sang with Udit Narayan.
- Vijay, sang Kandangi Kandangi from Jilla. He also lent his voice for Surya Sivakumar in the film Periyanna for a couple of songs.
- Mohanlal performed several songs in his films, including Neeyarinjo Melemanathu from Kandu Kandarinju (1985), Kadumee Nadumellam from Chithram (1988), AEIOU from Aye Auto (1990), Kaithappoovin Kannikkurumbil from Kannezhuthi Pottum Thottu (1998), Theerchayilla from Ustad (1999), Karukare Karuthoru from Balettan (2003), Nathoone Nathoone from Oru Naal Varum (2010) and Attumanal Payayil from Run Babby Run (2012).
- Suresh Gopi, sang "Doore Poopambaram" from Pilots (2000), "Ambilipoopenninum" from Satyameva Jayathe (2000), and "Chilamboliyude Kalapam" from Kanyakumari Express (2010).
- Raj Kapoor, sang one song in Dil Ki Rani (1947)
- Dilip Kumar, sang with Lata Mangeshkar in Musafir (1957)
- Nutan, sang in Chhabili (1960)
- Danny Denzongpa, sang in Yeh Gulistan Hamara (1972)
- Sidharth Malhotra, sang a rap in A Gentleman (2017)
- N. T. Rama Rao Jr, sang five songs in his own movies including Nannaku Prematho, Rabhasa, Adhurs, Kantri, Yamadonga and one song Geleya Geleya in Kannada language film which is Chakravyuha. Among them "Follow Follow" in Nannaku Prematho was mostly popular though others were also very nice. He also got 2 special Mirchi Music Awards South 2015.
- Sonu Nigam, a famous playback singer has also worked as an actor in a few movies like Jaani Dushman, Kash Aap Hamare Hote, and Love in Nepal and sung multiple songs in his movies.
- Ayushmann Khurrana is both an acclaimed singer and actor, singing in movies like Vicky Donor, Nautanki Saala!, Bewakoofiyaan, Hawaizaada, Laga Ke Haisha and virtually all of his movies.
