= Biswaroop Roy Chowdhury =

Discredited Indian self-proclaimed doctor

- Born: 23 July 1973 (age 52); India

Biswaroop Roy Chowdhury is a self-proclaimed doctor known for sharing medical conspiracy theories, including denialist conspiracies about COVID-19, HIV/AIDS, and diabetes, for which he has been heavily criticized and his claims have been widely discredited. Chowdhury's multiple YouTube and social media accounts have been terminated for spreading misleading health advice.

== Background ==
He is the author of several self-published books and creator of two films. Despite Chowdhury's claims he is a doctor, he has no formal qualifications or medical training. He reportedly received an honorary PhD in "diabetes science" from Alliance International University in Zambia, which is not accredited and has been described as an "online scam". Chowdhury reportedly runs an online diploma mill named World Records University that sells fraudulent PhDs.

== Views ==
In 2019, Chowdhury published his book "Diabetes Type 1 & Type 2 Cure in 72 Hrs," which argues that diabetes is not a medical disorder, but a "political disease." It refers to diabetes as "the biggest ever deception of modern medical science."

In August 2020, during the first peak of the COVID-19 pandemic in India, Chowdhury uploaded a video on YouTube calling for dropping the use of face masks, claiming that masks are a "form of slavery" and an ineffective method to control the virus. He cautioned his followers against COVID-19 vaccines and said: "If anyone influences you to take the vaccine, he is part of a group that wants to end your life and property."

== Criticisms and litigation ==
Several of Chowdhury's claims and theories surrounding COVID-19 have been debunked by multiple media outlets such as Firstpost, including his claims that face masks are ineffective at containing virus droplets. His YouTube video promoting anti-mask conspiracy theories was taken down by Twitter for violating their terms of use.

In 2005, Chowdhury worked on the Hindi film Yaad Rakhenge Aap, which claimed could somehow enhance the viewer's memory, and in 2006 he announced the film Kabhi Alvida Naa Kehna. This triggered a dispute with director Karan Johar, who was making his own film under the same name; both claimed that the title was registered with them.

Indian health officials have referred to his "miracle diabetes cure" as fraudulent. The Consumer Complaints Council (CCC) of the Advertising Standards Council of India (ASCI) in 2016 and 2017 found Chowdhury's advertisement for 'Diabetes Type 1 & Type 2 Cure in 72 Hrs' was false and grossly misleading. ASCI further stated that in making claims of curing diabetes, the advertisement was in breach of the law as it violated the Drugs and Magic Remedies (Objectionable Advertisements) Act, 1954.

A criminal complaint was filed against Chowdhury for falsely claiming to be a medical practitioner, offering fraudulent treatments, and failing to provide emergency care at courses he has run, which ultimately resulted in the death of a diabetic patient.
