= C. S. Rao (writer) =

Indian writer (1935–2020)

- Born: Chintapenta Satyanarayana Rao; 20 December 1935; Draksharamam, Andhra Pradesh, India
- Died: 14 April 2020 (aged 84)

Chintapenta Satyanarayana Rao (20 December 1935 – 14 April 2020) was an Indian writer, actor, director and producer.

== Filmography ==
=== Feature films ===
1. Oorummadi Bathukulu
2. Kamalamma Kamatam
3. Pranam Khareedu
4. Kukka kaatuku Cheppu Debba
5. Taram Maarindi
6. Nayakudu Vinayakudu
7. Malle Moggalu
8. Yagnam
9. Deeksha
10. Sommokadidi Sokokadidi (acted)
11. Sarada Ramudu (acted)
12. Matti Manushulu (acted)

=== Commissioned programmes ===
1. Ye Gooti Chilaka Aa Gooti Paluku (single episode commissioned program)
2. Rajasekhara Charitra
3. Bhartruhari Janma Vriththantam
4. Raaji Bujji
5. Jaataka Kathalu
6. Vikramarka Vijayam (dialogues only)
7. Kalapoornoday (Hindi Serial for National Network)
8. Temples in AP (Hindi Serial for National Network)
9. Karpoora Vasantha Raayalu
10. Music and Dance in AP (50 Years of Independence Series)
11. Vishnu Sharma English Chaduvu (Hyderabad Doordarshan Production)

=== Sponsored serials ===
1. Meeru Aalochinchandi
2. Sikhara Darsanam (single episode)
3. Mitra Laabham
4. Varudu Kaavali (13 episodes)
5. Damit Katha Addam Tirigindi
6. Dristi
7. Ganapathi
8. Vidya
9. Mallee Telavaarindi (given only screenplay)

=== TV plays ===
1. Credit Card
2. Teerpu (a play on 20 point formula)
3. Kamamma Mogudu
4. Oorummadi Bathukulu
5. Kallu Terandraa
6. Perfect Wife
7. Radha Maadhaveeyam
8. Cell Gola
9. Love Paathaalu
10. Koththa Dampathulu
11. Meerela Ante Alaage
12. Punya Bhumi (dialogues only)

=== Stage plays ===
1. Malli Eppudostharu
2. Vishnusharma English Chaduvu
3. Aadhunika Telugu Sahithyamlo Hasyam
