= Harinam Singh =

Harinam Singh is an Indian actor, producer and director, specialising in horror films.

In the English-speaking world his films are largely known to fans of extremely low-budget and technically incompetent films. For example, a review of his Shaitani Dracula describes the film as "a movie that fails so utterly on every single level", and as having "the feel of a movie put together by keenly untalented but enthusiastic high schoolers over the course of a weekend."

== Filmography ==
- Shaitani Dracula (2006)

== See also ==
- Ed Wood, an American filmmaker with a similar reputation.
