= Balla Moussa Keïta =

Malian actor and comedian

- Born: 1934; Nango, Mali
- Died: March 6, 2001 (aged 66–67); Bamako, Mali
- Occupation(s): Actor, Comedian

Balla Moussa Keïta (1934 – March 6, 2001) was a Malian actor and comedian, and a West African cinema pioneer who was well known in the West (especially France). Born in the Ségou Region of Mali as a traditional prince of the Keita dynasty, he was originally a radio producer. He later turned to acting and acted in a number of movies by notable Mali directors like Cheick Oumar Sissoko, Souleymane Cissé and Abdoulaye Ascofaré. Among his critically acclaimed roles are those of the tribal king Rouma Boll in Yeelen and as Mambi in Guimba, un tyrant, une époque. He received the Best Male Interpretation award at the FESPACO for his role in the Guinean film Séré, le témoin.

== Biography ==
=== Early life ===
Balla Moussa Keïta was born in Nango, Mali, a small village about 40 km from Ségou in 1934. Sent to school in Ségou at eight, Keïta's formal education came to an end after primary school when he returned home to help his parents in farming. Upon the death of his father, Keïta moved to Bamako to find work. Keïta initially worked as a middleman trader, buying fish and rice from Mopti and Dioro and reselling them in Bamako.

=== Career ===
In 1960, he managed to obtain a job with the National Theater (then under the Haut Commissariat à la jeunesse - the High Commission for Youth). Under the auspices of the Commissariat, Keïta recorded his first radio broadcast for Malian radio in 1967. Initially, Keïta recorded short advisories on bush fires and conduct of drivers. This ultimately led to the weekly program "Prévention et Circulation routière (Prevention and Road Traffic). Keïta thus became a well-known voice on the radio, and was popularly known as "Balla Moussa". He lent voice to numerous radio shows and newscasts during this period. His voice talents were utilized by government organizations like the AMP (Agence malienne de publicité) and the ANIM (Agence nationale d'information du Mali).

In 1965, Keïta travelled to the People's Republic of China with a Malian team to duplicate three films of socialist ideology in Bambara. The exercise lasted 5 months, but gave Keïta a valuable insight into film-making. He worked in his first film Den Muso, directed by Souleymane Cissé, starting in 1970. He went on to star in numerous critically acclaimed films, and worked with most Malian directors of repute, and numerous other African filmmakers.

Keïta has also taught at the Institut national des arts (National Institute of the Arts) of Mali. He was awarded the Best Male Interpretation Award at the FESPACO for his role in the Guinean film Séré, le témoin in 1991.

=== Death ===
He died in Bamako in 2001 of pulmonary emphysema partially due to heavy lifelong smoking habits, and is survived by ten children.

== Filmography ==
- 1975 : Den Muso, by Souleymane Cissé
- 1978 : Baara, by Souleymane Cissé
- 1982 : Finyè, by Souleymane Cissé
- 1987 : Yeelen, by Souleymane Cissé
- 1987 : Desebagato, by Emmanuel Sanon
- 1989 : Finzan, by Cheick Oumar Sissoko
- 1990 : Séré, le témoin, by Mohamed Dansogo Camara
- 1991 : Ta Dona, by Adama Drabo
- 1991 : Céline au Mali, by Monique Crouillère
- 1993 : Tiefing, by Djibril Kouyaté
- 1994 : L'Enfant Noir, by Laurent Chevallier
- 1995 : Guimba, un tyrant, une époque, by Cheick Oumar Sissoko
- 1995 : Waati, by Souleymane Cissé
- 1996 : Macadam Tribu, by José Zeka Laplaine
- 1997 : Faraw, une Mère des Sables, by Abdoulaye Ascofaré
- 1999 : La Genèse, by Cheick Oumar Sissoko
- 2000 : George Washington, by David Gordon Green
