= Habib Dembélé =

Malian actor, director and author

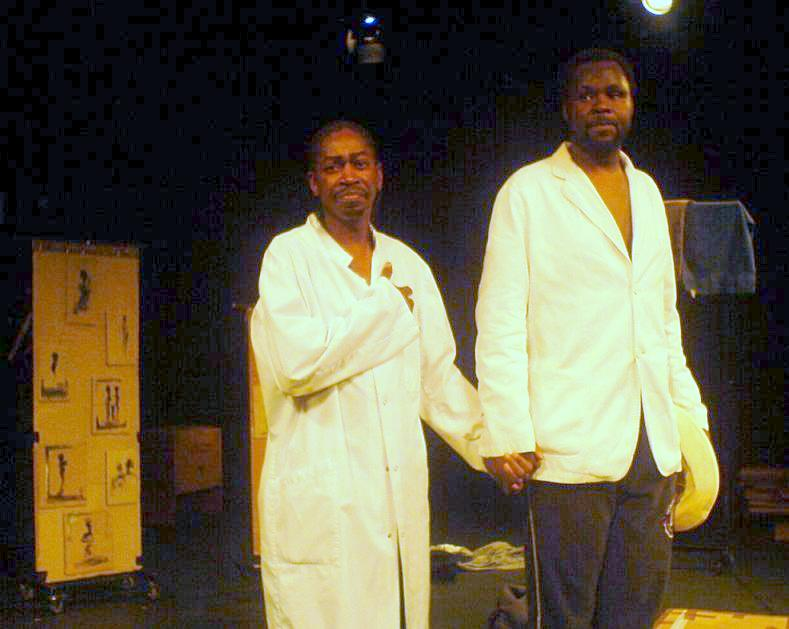
- Habib Dembélé (left) and Pitcho Womba Konga in Sizwe Banzi is Dead, Barbican Centre, London. (May 2007)
- Born: 19 April 1962 (age 64); San, Mali
- Citizenship: Mali
- Education: Institut National des Arts de Bamako
- Occupations: Actor, playwright, poet, novelist

Habib Dembélé (born 19 April 1962) is a Malian actor, director and author. He was a candidate for the Malian Presidential elections of 2002 and 2018.

== Early life and education ==
Dembélé attended Malian Institut National des Arts de Bamako (INA) after a school diploma : Etudes Fondamentales (DEF).

== Career ==
Dembélé is an actor, director, and author.

He performs both on stage and screen. He founded the Gouakoulou Company, the Guimba National Company and the Mandenka International Theatre. He received Mali's Best Actor Award in 1984. His theatre credits include The Strange Destiny of Wangrin, Hyène à jeun and Waari. His film credits include Guimba, le tyran and Finzan (by Cheick Oumar Sissoko), Filon d'or (by Sidi Diabaté) and Macadam Tribu (by Zeca Laplaine). He was also the assistant director on Cheick Oumar's 1997 film La genèse.

Dembélé co-adapted and performed in Sophocles' Antigone and his writing credits include plays such as A vous la nuit, and a novel Sacré Kaba. Dembélé has worked with renowned theatre director Peter Brook in several plays, among them Tragédie d'Hamlet, Tierno Bokar, and Sizwe Banzi is Dead.

== Politics ==
Dembélé was a candidate for the Malian Presidential elections of 2002 and 2018.

== Theatre career ==
- 1983 : Les Tondjons by Samba Niaré
- 1986 : L'Étrange Destin de Wangrin by Amadou Hampâté Bâ
- 1987 : La Hyène à jeun by Massa Makan Diabaté
- 1988 : Wari (in Bambara language) by Ousmane Sow
- 1989 : Férékégna Kamibougou (in Bambara language) by Ousmane Sow
- 1995 : Macadam Tribu by Zeka Laplaine
- 1995 : Louanse by Ousmane Sow
- 1997 : A Vous la Nuit by and with Habib dembélé
- 1998 : Antigone, an adaptation by Habib Dembélé and Jean-Louis Sagot-Duvauroux of Sophocles's Greek tragedy, directed by Sotigui Kouyaté
- 2002 : Hamlet by Shakespeare, directed by Peter Brook. Role : Polonius. (International Tour)
- 2002 : The Papalagi, from Erich Scheurmann's novel, directed by Hassane Kassi Kouyaté (International Tour)
- 2003 : The Bridge (French: Le Pont), by Laurent Van Wetter, directed by Sotigui Kouyaté (Switzerland & France tour)
- 2004 : Tierno Bokar, from Amadou Hampaté Bâ's A Spirit of Tolerance: The Inspiring Life of Tierno Bokar, directed by Peter Brook (International Tour)
- 2006 : Sizwe Banzi Is Dead by Athol Fugard, directed by Peter Brook (Théâtre des Bouffes du Nord (Paris) and international tour).
- 2009 : Kanouté ka visa ko (in Bambara language), by and with Habib Dembélé (first solo-performer in Mali)
- 2011 : Bab et Sane by René Zahnd, directed by Jean-Yves Ruf (International Tour)
- 2011 : The Island by Athol Fugard, directed by Hassane Kassi Kouyaté (International Tour)
- 2014 : Eye of the wolf (French: L'Œil du loup), inspired by Daniel Pennac's novel, directed by de Clara Bauer (France and Italy)
- 2015 : De la parole à l’écrit, tour of Mali patronned by the l'OIF Organisation Internationale de la Francophonie
- 2015 : A vous la Nuit, in Montréal (Canada) and Paris (France)
- 2015 : Journées Théâtres Guimba national, in Bamako (Mali)
- 2015 : The Island and The Papalagi, revival for Martinique tour and for the Festival sur le Niger, in Segou (Mali)
- 2016 : Sounjata by Alexis Martin, in Montréal (Canada)
- 2016 : Kanuté Visa Ko, in Ségou (Mali)
- 2016 : "La Comédie au service de la réconciliation, Journées Théâtrales Guimba national in Bamako (Mali)
- 2016 : Sabounyouman (Bamako, Mali)
- 2016 : Dioro Fali (Bamako, Mali)
- 2016 : 52, la bonne à tout faire (Bamako, Mali)
- 2016 : Sounjata by Alexis Martin, world-creation in Marrakesh (co-production Canada/Mali/Morocco)
- 2016 : A vous la nuit, tour in Switzerland and for the Festival sur le Niger, in Segou (Mali).
- 2017 : De la Démocratie, from Tocqueville essay, text et stage direction by Laurent Gutmann.

== Filmography ==
- 1989 : Finzan by Cheick Oumar Sissoko
- 1995 : Macadam Tribu by Zeca Laplaine
- 1995 : Guimba the Tyrant (French: Guimba, un tyrant, une époque), by Cheick Oumar Sissoko
- 1999 : Genesis (French: La Genèse) by Cheick Oumar Sissoko
- 2001 : Demain et tous les jours après, by Bernard Stora (TV Film - Arte)
- 2002 : Sia, le rêve du python by Dani Kouyaté
- 2004 : Moolaadé by Ousmane Sembène
- 2005 : Les aventures de Séko Bouaré (TV Series, ORTM)
- 2006 : Bamako by Abderrahmane Sissako
- 2007 : Faro, Goddess of the Waters by Salif Traoré
- 2009 : Quand la ville mord by Dominique Cabrera
- 2013 : Laurent et Safi by Anton Vassil
- 2014 : Tugël, au bout du petit matin... by Ousmane Barry
- 2016 : Wùlu by Daouda Coulibaly
- 2016 : Feu de mon corps by Stéphanie Lagarde
- 2016 : Wallay by Berni Goldblat
- 2023 : Like a Prince by Ali Marhyar
- 2024 : Vodka Fanta by Elisabeth Silveiro (short film)
- 2024 : Here & There by Ludovic Bernard
