= List of Malian films =

Malian films include:

== A ==
- Afrodita, el jardín de los perfumes (1998)

== B ==
- Bamako (2006)

== G ==
- La genèse (1999)
- Guimba, un tyran, une époque (1995), a.k.a. Guimba the Tyrant

== K ==
- Kennis Voor Het Leven (2005)

== L ==
- La Vie Sur Terre (1998) (also known as "Life on Earth")

== T ==
- Ta Dona (1991)
- Tell Me Who You Are (2009)

== W ==
- Waati (1995)
- The Wind (1982 - also known as Finye)

== Y ==
- Yeelen (1987) (also known as Brightness)

== See also ==
- Category:Malian films
- Category:Malian actors
- Category:Malian film directors
