= Mass media in Mali =

The mass media in Mali includes print, radio, television, and the Internet.

Radio is the primary means of mass communication in Mali. In practice, widespread poverty, a low literacy rate, and poor distribution outside of Bamako, limit access to television and print media. Mali has more than 125 radio stations as well as one television station. The former government-controlled radio and television broadcasting company is officially autonomous, but it has been accused by the political opposition of having a progovernment bias. Foreign radio programs are widely available through local media, and foreign satellite and cable television programs are also accessible, especially in Bamako.

There has been an explosion of print media since 1992 in conjunction with the initiation of multiparty democracy. In 2003 print media included 42 private newspapers and journals (39 in Bamako and one each in Tombouctou, Mopti, and Sikasso) published in French, Arabic, and various national languages. The expression of a broad range of views, including those critical of the government, is permitted.

== Media regulation and restrictions ==
In Mali, Freedom of speech and freedom of the press are guaranteed by the constitution and generally observed by the government. The Superior Council of Communication regulates the media. URTEL is the agency responsible for regulating television and radio transmission operations in Mali.

Newspapers must register with the Ministry of Communications, but registration is routine. During election campaigns, the constitutionally mandated Committee of Equal Access to State Media is charged with guaranteeing that all political parties have equal access to government-controlled media.

The government does not restrict access to or use of the Internet, but in practice Internet use is very limited because of the cost of computers and licenses to operate servers.

In March 2022, the Malian government announced it would suspend broadcasts by Radio France Internationale and France 24, accusing them of false reporting of army killings of civilians.

== Publications ==
Mali has several daily and weekly newspapers. Their circulation is limited due to high illiteracy rates. Mali remains a country of oral tradition.

=== French language publications ===
- L'Essor (national daily), created in 1961, this is also the government's daily news publisher on the Internet: l'Essor - Quotidien d'Informations du Mali
- Les Échos (daily), created in 1989
- Nouvel Horizon (daily), created in 1992
- L'Indépendant (daily), created in 1994
- Soir de Bamako (daily), created in 1996
- Info-Matin (daily), created in 1997. It publishes online (Info matin)
- Le Républicain (daily), created in 1992 and also publishes on the Internet (Le Républicain - Quotidien d'Informations du Mali)
- Aurore (biweekly), created in 1990, formerly edited by Abdramane Keïta
- Le Scorpion (humour weekly), created in 1991
- Le Courrier (weekly), created in 1996
- Le Malien (biweekly), created in 1991
- Liberté (weekly), created in 1999
- Le Continent (Weekly), created in 2000
- La Nouvelle Tribune (weekly), created in 2002
- Le Patriote (weekly), created in 2000
- Le Challenger (weekly), created in 2002
- Grin-Grin (monthly youth magazine)
- Le Ségovien first newspaper of Ségou, also publishes online : Free People Search Engine
- Le Combat, daily

=== Indigenous languages ===
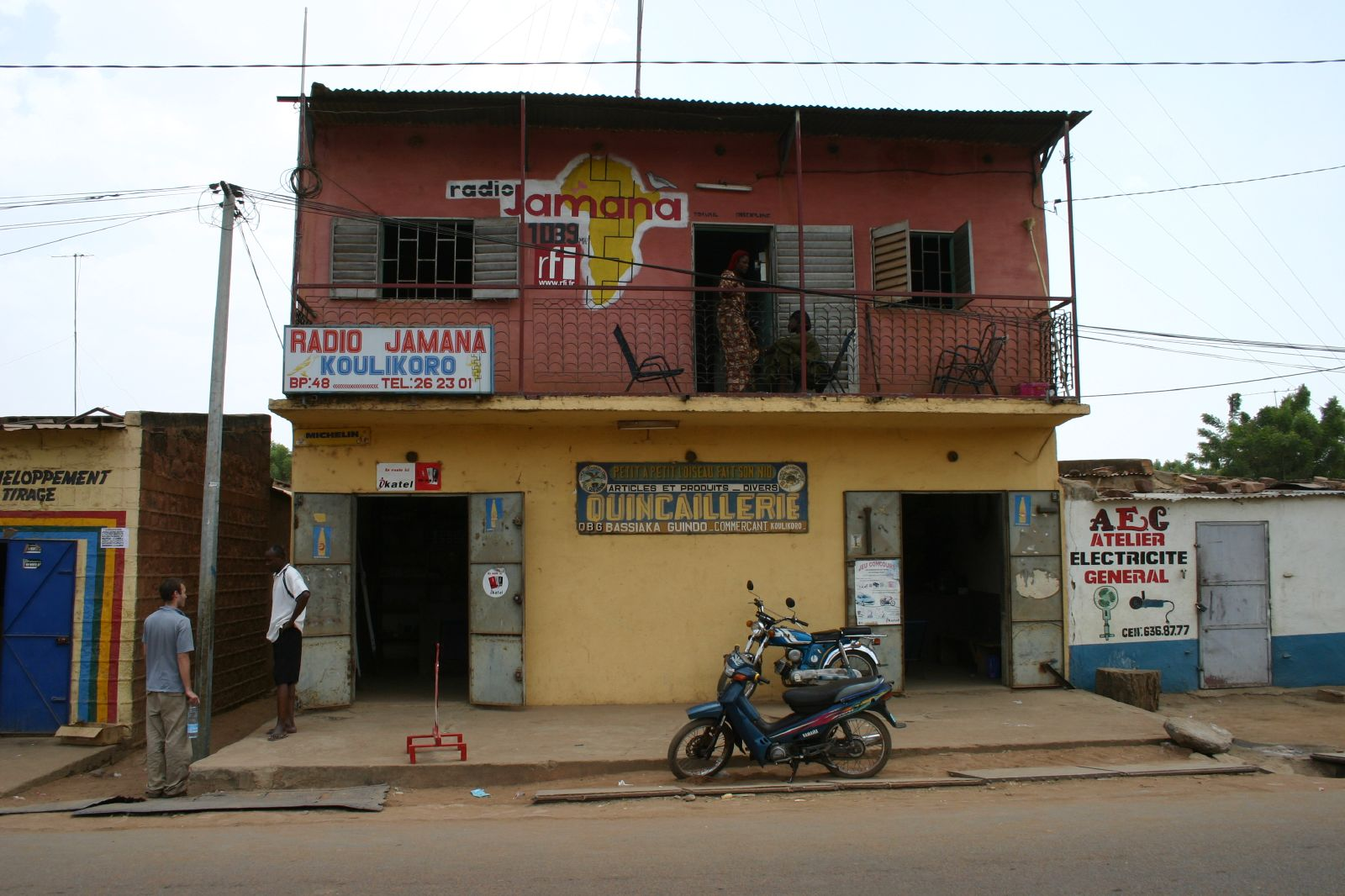
Radio Jamana in Koulikoro, Mali

- Kibaru (Monthly) general news coverage in Bambara), created in 1972
- Kabaaru (Monthly) general news coverage in Fulfulde), created in 1983
- Xibaare (Monthly) general news coverage in Soninké) created in 1993
- Jèkabaara (Monthly) general news coverage in Bambara) created in 1986

=== Niche publications ===
- Graine d’espoir, is a monthly review published by Mahamane Garba Touré, who is thé Director of Publication and Editor in Chief, supported by Ousmane Mamadou, an agricultural engainer and directoire of thé Centre de formation professionnelle pour la promotion de l’agriculture au Sahel (CFP-PAS) in Gao, an organisation for professional agricultural training. The publication's goal is to inform rural agricultural business owners and to "echo national initiatives for the development of the agricultural world in Mali ". The first issue was published in June 2007. The circulation is around 1000.

== Radio ==
Office de Radiodiffusion Télévision du Mali (ORTM) is the national broadcasting entity. It offers two radio stations, a national format radio station and Station 2 created in 1993 and transmitting on FM.

Around 150 private radios stations exist, accessible on the FM band.

The rural radio network has grown rapidly. Access to information in local languages has a considerable impact for the people in terms of quality of life and the implications for the management of local affairs affecting their communities. More and more radio stations have begun broadcasting on the Internet. The challenge is the economic return needed to sustain these media centers and the costs of technical maintenance services for radio stations themselves. Through the network of the Union of Free Radio and Television of Mali (URTEL) radios can be connected together to cover major events such as football or track the 1997 legislative elections.

Radio stations include:

- Office de Radiodiffusion Television du Mali (ORTM) (public network of national and regional stations)
- Radio Bamakan (community station, Bamako)
- Radio Benkan (Bamako)
- Radio Canal 2000 (Bamako)
- Radio Frequence 3 (FR3) (commercial, Bamako)
- Radio Guintan (Bamako)
- Radio Kaira (Bamako)
- Radio Kledu (commercial, Bamako)
- Radio Liberte (commercial, Bamako)
- Radio Patriote (commercial, Bamako)
- Radio Rurale (network of community stations)
- Radio Tabale (Bamako)
- Voix du Coran (Islamic station, Bamako)

The president of URTEL, Moussa Keïta, recalls that "We like to say that the 'Office de Radiodiffusion Télévision du Mali (ORTM) is the Voice of Mali and the local radio stations are the Voice of Malians."

Radio France internationale (RFI) is especially popular with listeners. Its news programs are broadcast by many local radio stations. BBC and Voice of America are also available in French in partnership with local radio stations.

It is also possible to listen to French radio through a subscription with French-owned CanalSat Horizons.

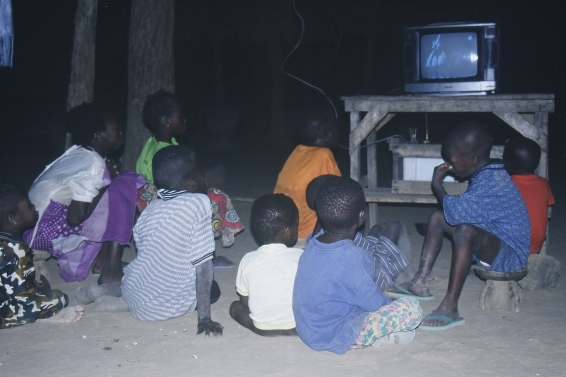
Children watching television in a village in Mali

== Television ==
The Office de Radiodiffusion Télévision du Mali (ORTM) operates a national public television channel: ORTM Télévision nationale. Since being introduced in February 2007, this channel can also be received in Europe via satellite W3A of Eutelsat, positioned at 7 degrees east.

TV5MONDE, the French channel broadcasting to the countries of la francophonie (French-speaking countries worldwide) is transmitted to satellite and in hertz almost everywhere in Mali. It is relatively accessible with a simple antenna.

A new channel was recently introduced in Bamako: "Africable, la chaîne du continent".

Two Mali businesses are proposing a selection of channels through MMDS reception, with channel offerings specializing in formats such as sports, children's programming, news, movies, and so on, through monthly subscription.

It is also possible to subscribe to CanalSat Horizons through live satellite reception (RDS, different from MMDS). This way it is possible to watch a large number of channels from Africa as well as Europe, in English and in Arabic.

Television stations include:

- Office de la Radiodiffusion Television du Mali (ORTM) - public, programmes in French and local vernacular languages
- Multi Canal stations (multichannel operator)
- Tele-Kledu stations (multichannel operator)

== Internet ==
Internet services underwent much testing before being introduced to Mali in 1997. There are five Internet service providers, who operate through the intermediation of the SOTELMA (société des télécommunications du Mali). The Internet infrastructure remains costly and difficult to maintain. The dominant private telecommunications company is Ikatel (called Orange). Its services include Live Box and 3g plus. Since the beginning of 2011, rival company Malitél was launched to be price competitive.

Bamako hosted an international conference "Bamako 2000 : les passerelles du développement" on information technology, during which the former president of the republic of Mali, Alpha Oumar Konaré, promoted Internet access to all communities in Mali. Mali also presided over preparations for the Sommet de la Société de l'Information.

A number of cybercafés, and telecommunications centres (public, community or privately owned) have emerged since 1997 in the capitol Bamako. Many have had to close their doors due to difficulties in management and high fixed costs for network connections. Today, those that are surviving are those that support or develop a certain critical mass (access to a large number of computers, a regular customer base) and that offer complementary activities like training or equipment sales.

Many students have at least an email address and can benefit from access to relatively accessible prices for Internet research. Many businesses have access to the Internet through telephone. The costs of permanent connections to the radio broadcasting network remain high, but have tended to progressively diminish (100,000 Fcfa per month for an organisation, 30,000 Fcfa per month for an individual).

Internet is reaching a progressively larger territory. Regional capitols all have Internet access, as well as a number of mid-sized towns along principal roads.

The skills needed to publish on the Web are increasingly available, but Internet hosting and support for Websites remains highly variable.

- Togunet (national politics, training, workshops with agricultural themes, health): a network for the promotion of information technology in the development of Mali (Nouvelles Technologies Information et Communication - Actualités)
- Campus numérique francophone de Bamako de l'Agence Universitaire de la Francophonie (offers information technology training, and bursaries for researchers and students): (Mali contact)
- Initiatives Mali Gateway: An organization for local development activities in Mali
- Geekcorps au Mali: Radio and internet installation and other activities (Geekcorps Mali)
- Afribone (Afribone Mali)
- Malikounda (Malikounda.com)

== See also ==
- Telecommunications in Mali
- Cinema of Mali
- Human rights in Mali

== Bibliography ==
- "Mali: Directory: the Press". Africa South of the Sahara 2004. Regional Surveys of the World. Europa Publications. 2004. p. 694+. ISBN 1857431839.
- "Mali", Freedom of the Press, USA: Freedom House, 2016, OCLC 57509361, archived from the original on 2017-06-03
