= Studio Tamani =

Studio Tamani is a media outlet in Mali that broadcasts radio programs in 5 languages, articles and podcasts online and via social networks. Studio Tamani is based in the Maison de la Presse (Press Centre) in Bamako. It is a joint initiative of Mali’s main community radio network URTEL, “peace media” specialist Fondation Hirondelle, Sweden, Switzerland and the European Union. The programs are produced by a team of 60 Malian journalists, with an editorial staff in Bamako and 35 correspondents across the country.

Studio Tamani has emerged as a "voice of reason" and trusted source for local, national, regional West-African and International news outlets for daily news, updates on terrorist attacks as well as stability and progress on the Algiers Peace Accord in Mali. Broadcasting from this war-torn country’s capital, Studio Tamani has received respect in foreign policy circles for bringing implacable enemies together for dialogue, and has been cited by international organizations such as UNESCO as an example of the importance of reaching people in their local languages to be a viable platform for dialogue among disparate groups.

Studio Tamani was founded during the Malian civil war with the goal of producing high-quality news and debate programs, and has been said to have transformed Mali’s media landscape. In a vast country with isolated populations where only one third of the adults are literate, many local languages are spoken, and internet access is still sparse in rural areas, radio is the most available source of news and information for all. Everybody listens to at least one of the country’s plethora of radio stations. Tamani stands out it's fact-based reporting, interviews of locals who have witnessed first-hand terrorist attacks and intimidation from armed groups, as well as for hosting high-level political figures, broken major stories, aired unprecedented debates on controversial topics like female genital mutilation, and become one of the most widely listened-to and respected radio stations.

The name "Tamani" is the name of a small djembe drum popular in Malian musical heritage, and serves as a positive image for this project focused on facilitating and promoting dialogue between all Malians.

One of Studio Tamani stated objectives is to produce news bulletins and other radio programs designed to help strengthen peace and reconciliation in Mali. Studio Tamani’s programming is broadcast by 24 partner radio stations throughout the country. A network of community radio stations also partners with Studio Tamani, broadcasting programs for two hours a day throughout Mali in French, Bambara, Sonrhaï, Tamashek and Peulh.

Many of Studio Tamani's journalists have been trained abroad and have been featured in international forums to improve the knowledge and understanding of the complexity of the security and political situations in Mali and have assisted the international community in further understanding the complexity of Mali and why the stability of the country is under constant threat. Studio Tamani has been featured as a voice of reason for daily news, humanitarian issues and peace building by the Malian and international press.

While events in war torn country indicate that the threat of war is ever present in Mali, Studio Tamani's team of journalists have been known to push for dialogue between all groups in the conflict.

Studio Tamani has apps for download on several mobile platforms, including Google Play.

== See also ==
- Media of Mali
