= Television in Mali =

Television in Mali was introduced in 1983.

The following is a list of television channels broadcast in Mali.

== Main channels ==
Name	Owner	Type	Launched
ORTM	Government of Mali	Public-owned	1983
Africable	-	-	2004

== See also ==
- Television in Mali (in French)
- Media of Mali
- Telecommunications in Mali
- Lists of television channels
