= Africable =

- Broadcast area: Africa, Europe
- Headquarters: Bamako

Ownership
- Owner: Africable

History
- Launched: 26 June 2004

Links
- Website: africabletelevision.com

Africable is a free-to-air, French-language, pan-African TV-channel headquartered in Bamako, Mali. The channel launched on June 26, 2004, born from the desire of young cable operators in Francophone-Africa.

== History ==
The channel was conceived in 2003 by Ismaila Sidibé, who in 1993 was granted the access to relay TV5 into Mali and founded MMDS operator Multicanal in 1995. The philosophy was based on his existing relays of foreign channels, in order to democratize access to information to lower-end Malians.

== Programming ==
Africable's programming focuses on the African unity and pride. Their slogan is "La Chaîne du Continent". The channel broadcasts news programmes ("Journal") from ORTM (Mali), RTI (Ivory Coast), RTS 1 (Sénégal), RTB (Burkina-Faso), ORTB (Benin), Télé Sahel (Niger), CRTV (Cameroon), RTG1 (Gabon) and RTG (Guinea). These receive fifteen minutes of airtime per program.

== Availability ==
- Via MMDS-antenna
  - Benin
  - Burkina Faso
  - Cameroon
  - Chad
  - Gabon
  - Guinea
  - Mali
  - Niger
  - Sénégal
  - Togo
- Via UHF-antenna
  - Burkina Faso
  - Niger
  - Sénégal
- Via Satellite Intelsat 707
  - Africa
  - Europe
- Via Satellite Eutelsat W3A
  - Europe
  - North Africa
  - Middle East

== See also ==
- Television in Mali
