= South Seas =

Geographic term generally referring to the portion of the Pacific Ocean below the equator

Today the term South Seas, or South Sea, most commonly refers to the portion of the Pacific Ocean south of the equator. The term South Sea may also be used synonymously for Oceania, or even more narrowly for Polynesia or the Polynesian Triangle, an area bounded by the Hawaiian Islands, New Zealand and Easter Island. Pacific Islanders are commonly referred to as South Sea Islanders, particularly in Australia.

The term was coined as Mar de Sur, or "South Sea", by Spanish conquistador Vasco Núñez de Balboa in 1513 as he encountered it on the southern coast of the Isthmus of Panama and it was applied to the entirety of today's Pacific Ocean. In 1520, Ferdinand Magellan named the same ocean the Pacific Ocean, and over time Magellan's name became more well-known.

== Origin ==
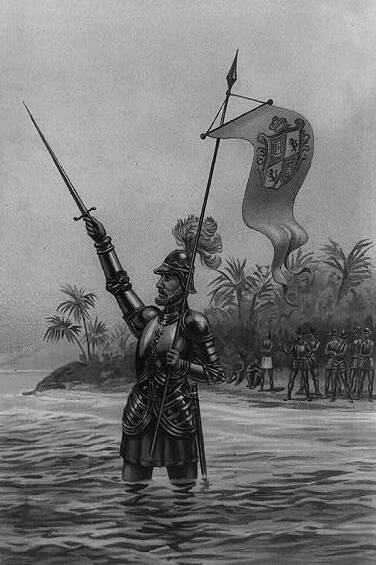
Vasco Núñez de Balboa

The Spanish conquistador Vasco Núñez de Balboa coined the term "South Sea" when he traveled across the Isthmus of Panama and reached the Bay of San Miguel, naming the ocean ahead Mar del Sur ("South Sea") due to its location along the southern shore of the isthmus.

Spain claimed the South Sea as its mare clausum during the Age of Discovery.

Núñez de Balboa and his soldiers attempted to travel to the peak of the mountain to see the sea, but when they arrived at the foot of the mountain only 69 out of 190 soldiers had survived the journey. Balboa did not want to share the experience of being the first to see the unknown ocean and so he commanded his crew to remain at the foot of the mountain and wait. He then became the first European to see the Pacific Ocean on 25 September 1513. After looking at the ocean alone for some time, he told his crew to come up to join him.

After he set foot into the ocean, at the opening of the Saban river he declared the South Sea, and all adjoining lands to be property of his king.

== Literature and film ==
A genre of literature and film has developed around the South Seas because it is often seen as an idealized and romanticized region of the world.

In 1773, when James Cook came to Tahiti for the second time, he was accompanied by Johann Reinhold Forster and Georg Forster, two German scientists.

"What a morning—impossible to be described more beautifully by any poet—when we saw the isle O-Taheiti two miles ahead of us."

The reports of the discoveries determined the Europeans' picture of the South Seas for a long time. On those grounds, Joseph Banks wrote:

"An Arcadia of which we will be king."

Louis Antoine de Bougainville's romantic travel report Voyage autour du monde and Georg Forster's travel description A Voyage Round the World (1777) confirmed Jean-Jacques Rousseau's image of the "noble savage". He describes the country as "jardin d'Eden" (Garden of Eden), which provided his residents with everything required to live. He saw the islanders as pure humans who were not yet poisoned by civilization. The report Voyage autour du monde inspired Denis Diderot to write his essay Supplément au voyage de Bougainville, a plea for sexual freedom.

Paul Gauguin, a French artist, contributed to the idea of a Garden of Eden by creating paintings of exotic paradises rather than as they really were.

The German writer Erich Scheurmann also utilized this imagery when he created fictional travel reports of a South Seas chief that were published between 1915 and 1920 under the title The Papalagi. The book gained popularity fifty years after it was published and sold more than 1.7 million copies in German alone.

== Drawings and paintings ==
Joseph Banks hired Sydney Parkinson, a nature draftsman, and Alexander Buchan, landscape painter, to accompany James Cook's first expedition to the Pacific (1768–1771) and to record the discoveries that were made. Parkinson and Buchan depicted the people living on the Society Islands, the coasts of New Zealand, and on Easter Island and their environments in drawings and paintings. The painter William Hodges accompanied Captain Cook on his second expedition to the South Seas, New Zealand, Tonga, the Society Islands, Melanesia, and Easter Island among others. During Cook's third expedition to the South Seas, John Webber painted South Sea motifs on the Cook Islands, Tahiti and Hawaii, among other places.

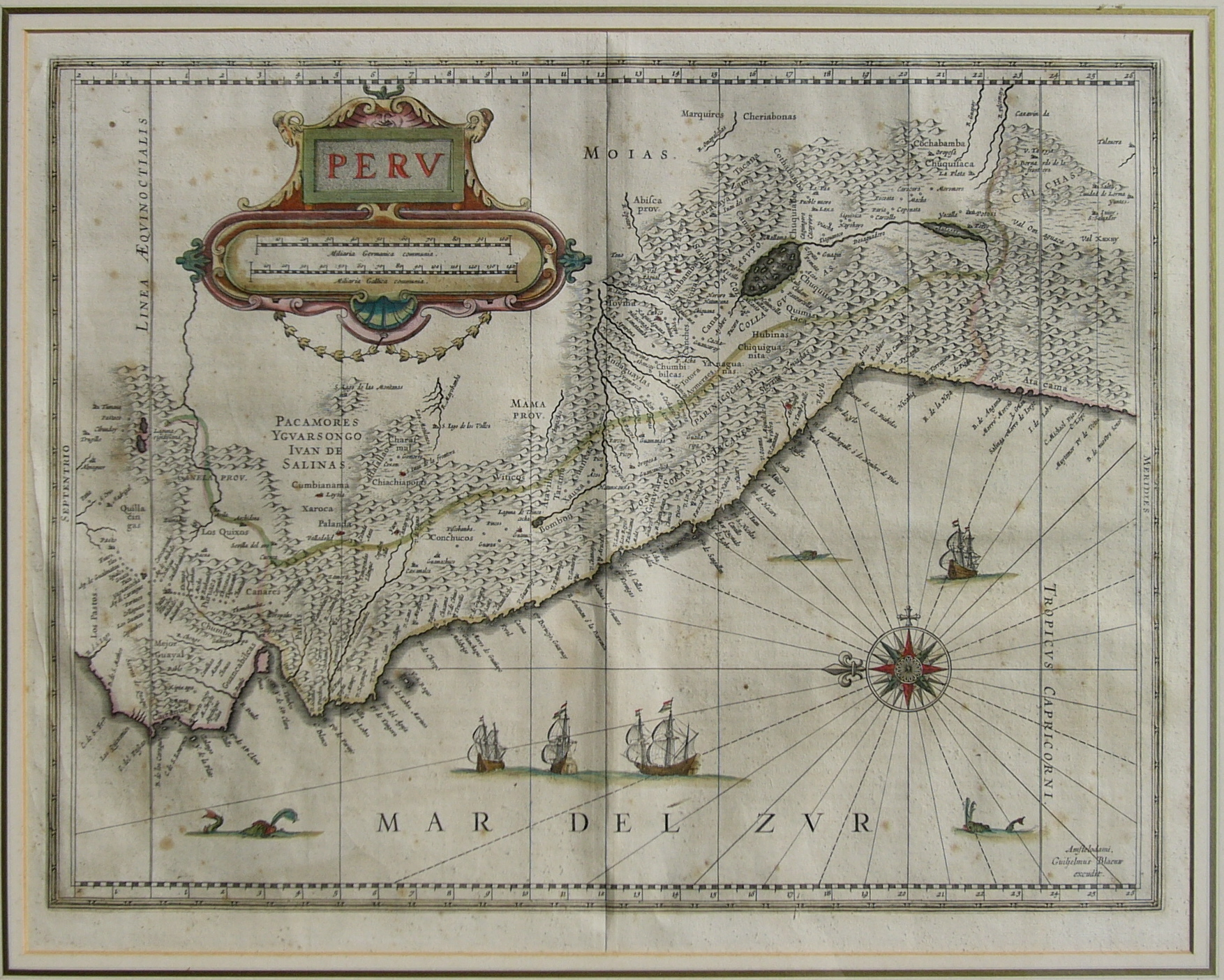
Old map of Peru with the Mar del Sur

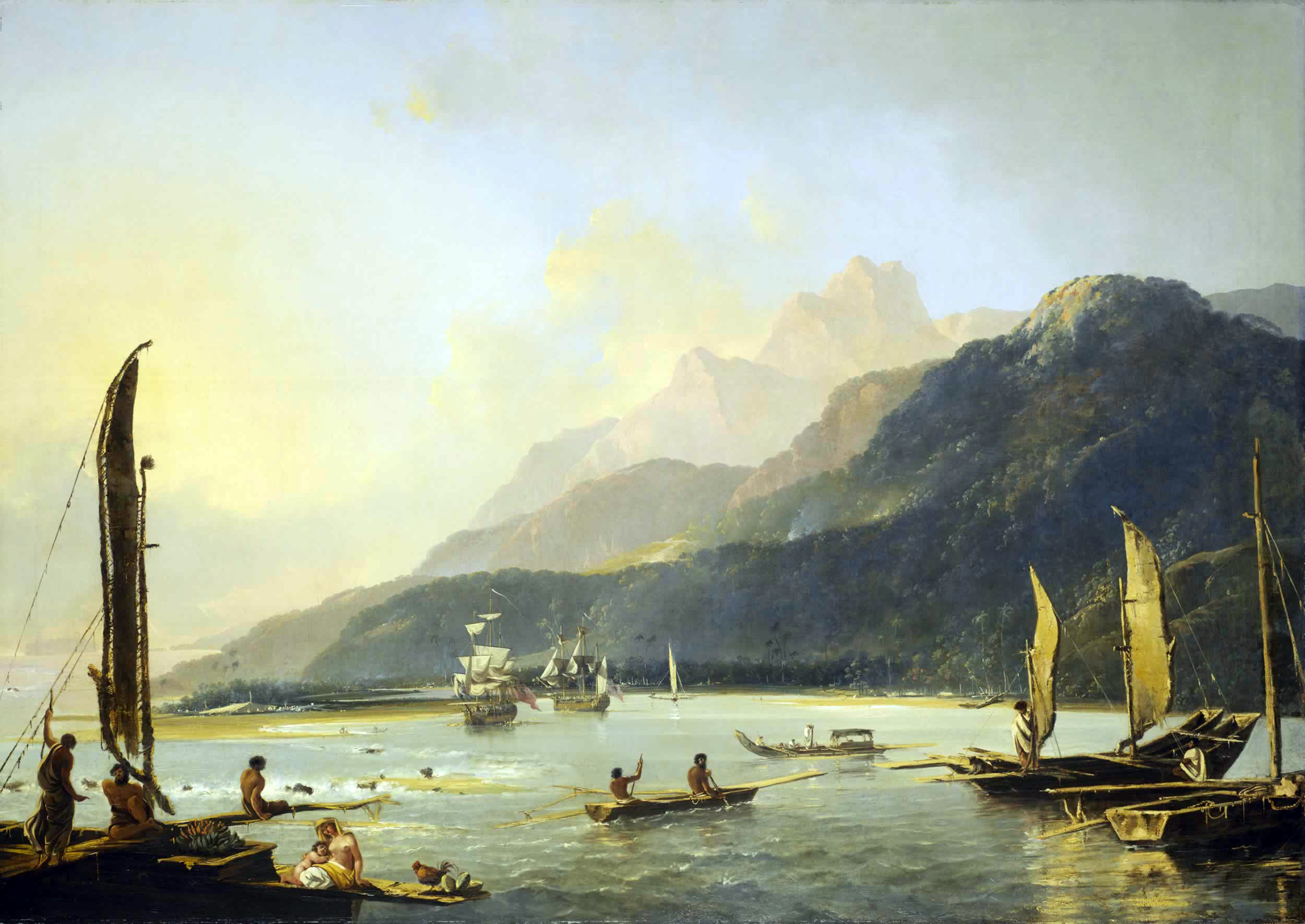
William Hodges: Resolution and Adventure with a fishing boat in the bay by Matawai (Tahiti), Oil on canvas, 1776 (National Maritime Museum, London)

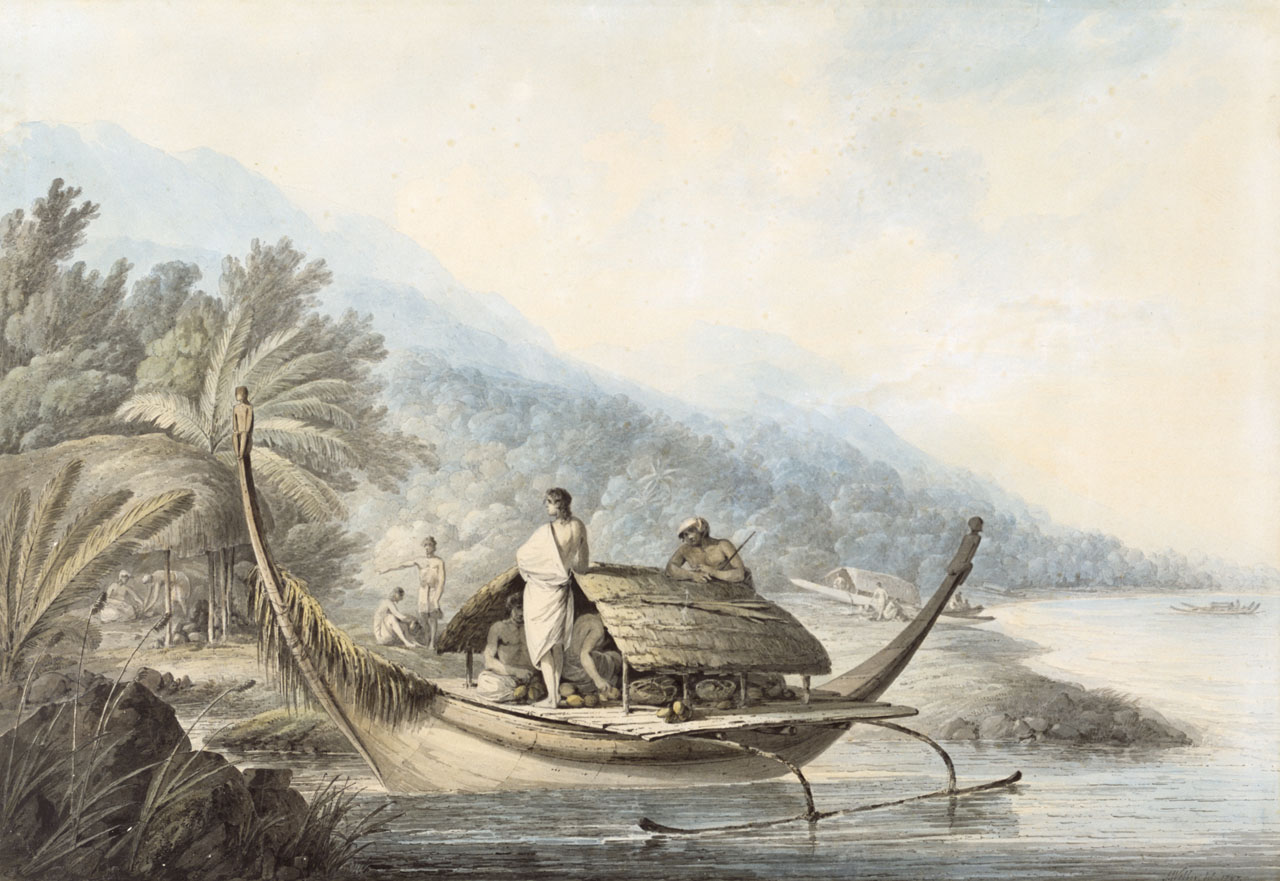
John Webber: A View in Ulietea (Raiatea), (French Polynesia), Watercolor with pencil and ink, without year (National Maritime Museum, London)

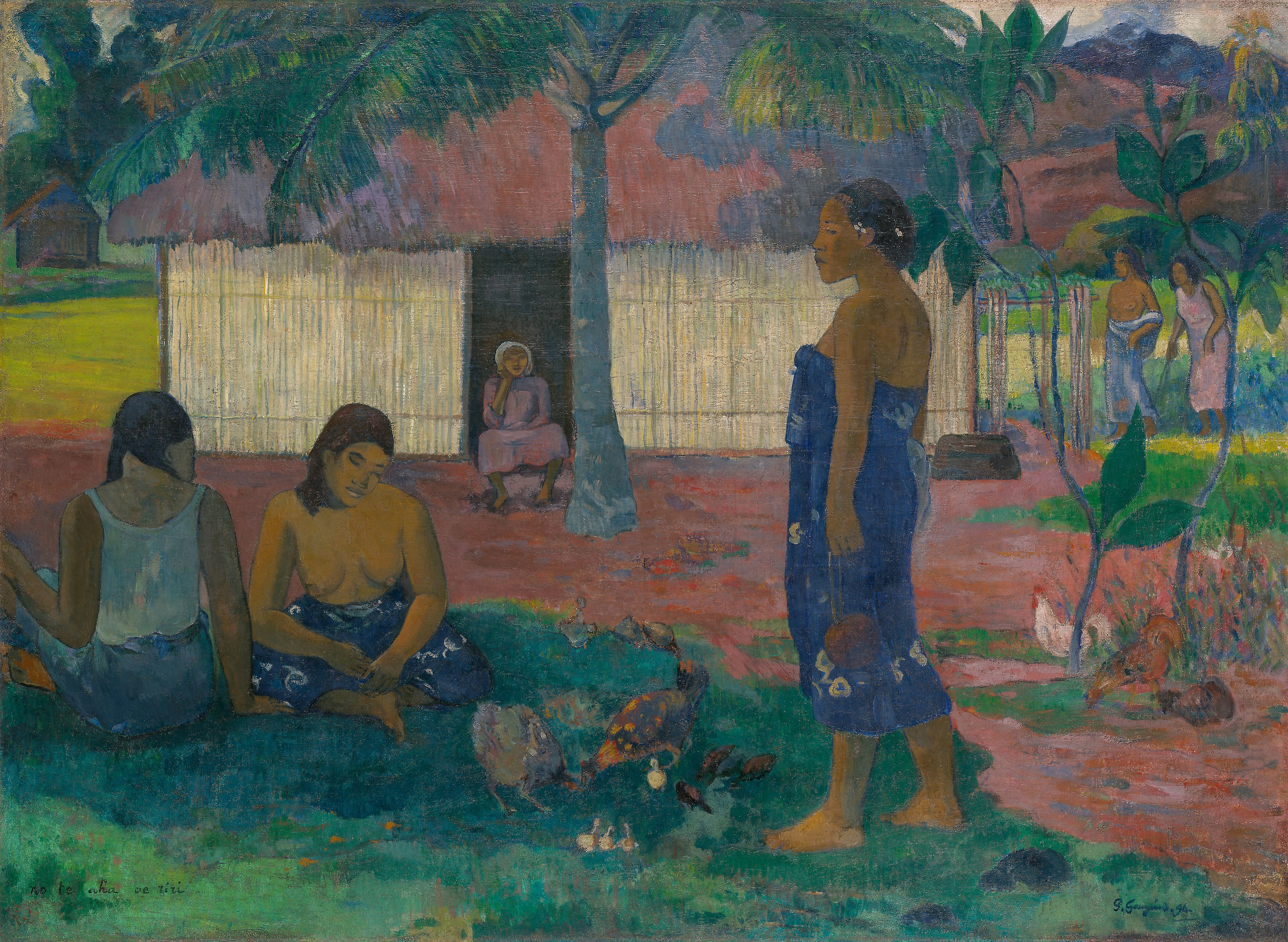
Paul Gauguin: No te aha oe riri ("Why are you angry?"), Oil on canvas, 1896 ( The Art Institute of Chicago)

Emil Nolde: South Sea Islander (Südsee-Insulaner II), Color lithograph 1915 (Brooklyn Museum)

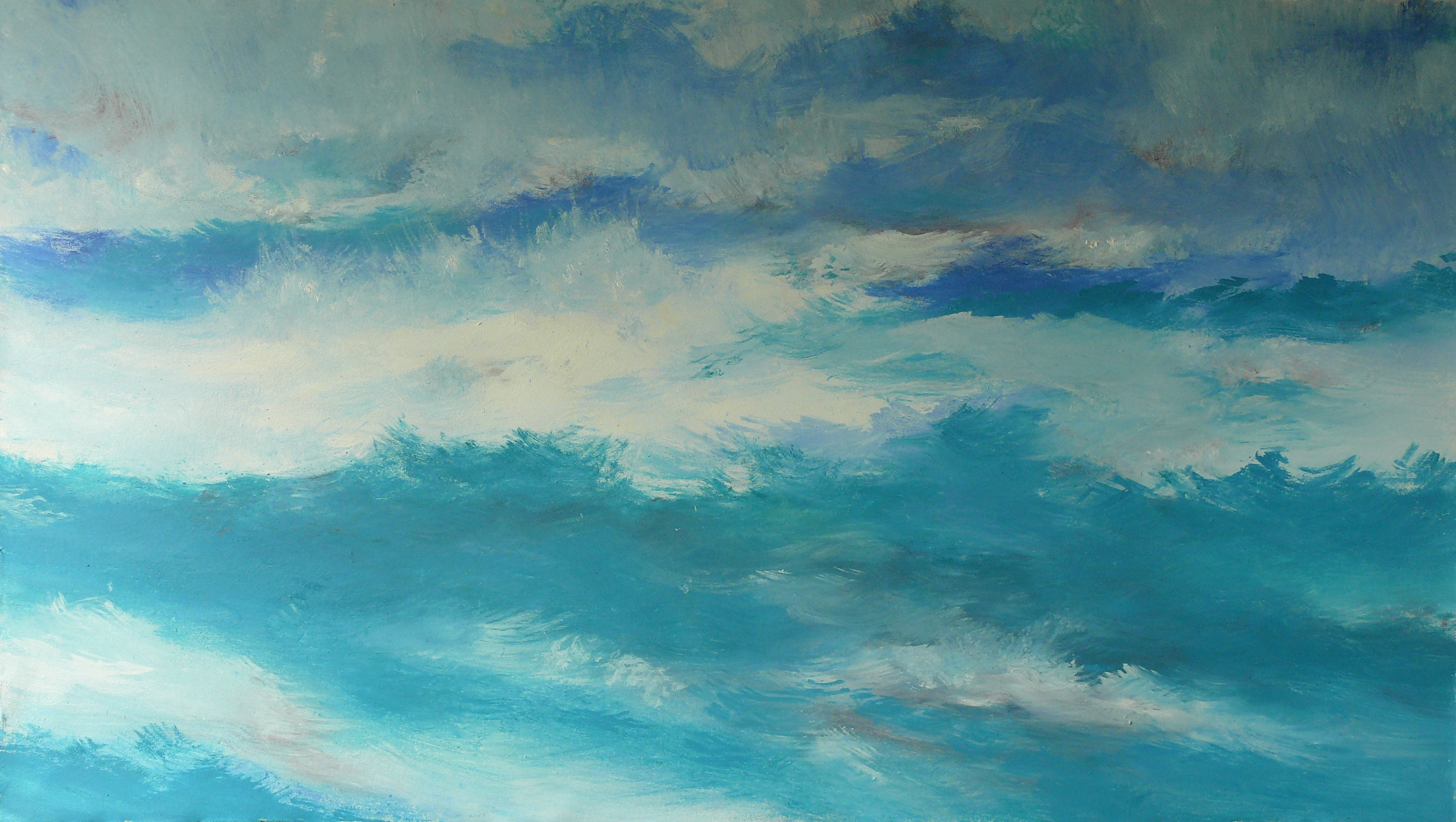
Ingo Kühl: The Sea IV, Oil on canvas, 2012, painted in Vanuatu

Paul Gauguin reached Tahiti in April 1891 and painted 66 paintings during his time there. He left the island in early 1892 due to health problems and brief difficulties and later returned to Paris to travel to Papeete in September 1895. He died in 1903 on the Marquesas.

Gauguin is considered a pioneer of expressionism because of his South Sea paintings. Other artists that traveled to areas within the South Seas include Emil Nolde, Max Pechstein, Henri Matisse, Per Kirkeby, and most recently artist Ingo Kühl.

== Other usages of the term "South Seas" ==
The South Seas Mandate was the name of the Japanese mandate over certain islands following World War I.

The "South Seas trade" was a term used in Britain in the nineteenth century to denote sealing, whaling, island trading and other commercial ship-based activities in the Pacific.

== See also ==
- South Sea (disambiguation)
