= Adama Drabo =

Malian filmmaker and playwright

- Born: 1948 (age 77–78); Bamako, Mali
- Occupations: filmmaker, playwright

Adama Drabo (1948 - July 15, 2009) was a Malian filmmaker and playwright.

== Biography ==
Drabo was born in the Malian capital of Bamako, where he showed an interest in film since his childhood. For ten years, he was a schoolteacher in a Malian village, and in his spare time he painted and wrote plays. His career in film began as a hobby.

In 1979, he joined the Centre national de production cinématographique (CNPC). There, he worked with director Cheick Oumar Sissoko as an assistant director on the 1986 film Nyamanton and the 1989 film Finzan.

In 1988, he produced a short film, Nieba, la journée d'une paysanne.

In 1991, he produced his first full-length film, Ta Dona (Au feu!), which was nominated for the Gold Lion prize at the Locarno International Film Festival, and featured at FESPACO. It was also screened in the Un Certain Regard section at the 1991 Cannes Film Festival.

In 1997, he produced Taafé Fanga, which tells the story of a Dogon woman who finds a magical mask and uses its powers to reverse gender roles in her village. This film was featured in film festivals worldwide, including at Cannes, Tokyo, Namur, and Ouagadougou. He died in Algeria from cardiac arrest during the "Festival culturel panafricain d’Alger".

== Filmography ==
- Nieba, la journée d'une paysanne (Nieba, the Day of a Peasant Woman) (1988)
- Ta Dona (Au feu!) (1991)
- Taafé Fanga (1997) (The Power of the Skirt)
- Kokadjè : laver proprement (2003)
- Faantan Fanga (2009) (The Power of the Poor) (mostly written wrongly as "Fantan fanga", which would mean "The Power of the Orphan" in Bambara)

== Bibliography ==
Adama Drabo has written many plays, including:

- Massa, 1972
- Le Trésor de l'Askia (The Treasure of Askia), 1977
- L'Eau de Dieu tombera (The Water of God will fall), 1982
- Pouvoir de Pagne (Skirt Power), 1983
