= Alioune Ifra Ndiaye =

Malian film director and playwright

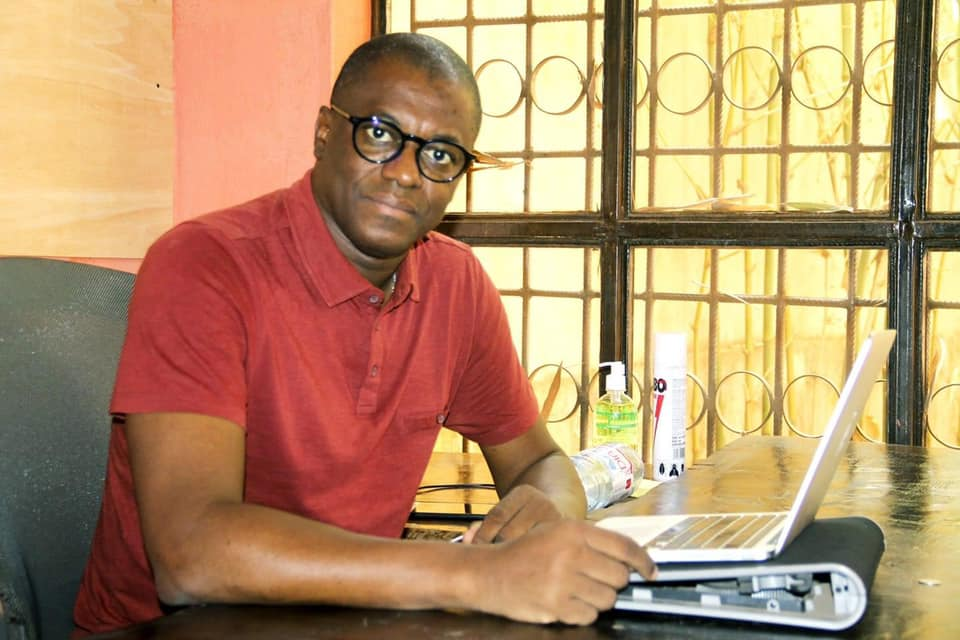
- Born: 1969 or 1970 (age 55–56); Mali
- Education: Université du Québec à Montréal; University of Sorbonne Nouvelle Paris 3
- Occupations: Film director, playwright
- Years active: 2001-present
- Children: 6

Alioune Ifra Ndiaye (born 1969 or 1970) is a Malian film director and playwright.

== Biography ==
Ndiaye is the son of a gendarme, and his older brother is film director Souleymane Cissé. Inspired by his brother's career, Ndiaye moved to Canada to study filmmaking at the Université du Québec à Montréal. He returned to Bamako in 1997 to earn a master's degree in history. In 1998, Ndiaye founded the BlonBa theatre troupe alongside his friend, French philosopher and writer Jean-Louis Sagot-Duvauroux. He also studied cultural relations at the University of Sorbonne Nouvelle Paris 3. Ndiaye co-wrote and produced five shows in the kotèba theatrical tradition, and the BlonBa troupe gave several hundred performances in Senegal, Benin, France and Belgium. In January 2007, BlonBa opened its cultural space, the only alternative to the French Cultural Center (CCF). The cultural space was forced to close in the aftermath of the 2012 Malian coup d'état, but its French branch allowed it to remain in business.

Ndiaye also directed documentaries, fiction films, and music videos, and he invented the telekotèba concept. He trained in film editing software in Paris, participated in TV productions and served as a consultant in Chad to help restructure existing TV channels. In 2012, he applied for the position of general manager of the Office de Radiodiffusion-Télévision du Mali, but was not selected. In 2013, Ndiaye founded his own television channel in Bamako, called Wôklôni after the elves in Mandingo mythology. He started the channel with his own funds, but never received an official license from the government. Ndiaye directed a show called Taynibougou, la cité des profiteurs, criticizing the level of corruption in the country. He published the book Banyengo in 2016, in order to promote the national culture. In 2017, the BlonBa cultural space reopened. Ndiaye is the creator of the artists collective Djinè Ton.

Ndiaye is the founder of the political movement Wele Wele, which seeks to mobilize young people to run for political office. He is an animist, and is controversial in Mali for not practicing Islam. Ndiaye has four children, including twins from his first marriage. He coordinates an annual drama writing workshop.
