= Tell Me Who You Are =

Tell Me Who You Are may refer to:

- Tell Me Who You Are (2009 film), a 2009 Malian drama film
- Tell Me Who You Are (1933 film), a 1933 German comedy film
- "Tell Me Who You Are" (Malene song), the Danish entry in the Eurovision Song Contest 2002
- "Kazi Koj Si Ti" ("Tell Me Who You Are"), a song by Tamara Todevska, the Macedonian entry in the Eurovision Song Contest 2007
- "Tell Me Who You Are", a song by Jandek from Somebody in the Snow
