= Yaya Coulibaly =

Malian puppet designer, puppeteer and storyteller

- Born: January 2, 1993 (age 33); Bamako Region
- Education: Institut Universitaire de gestion IUG Bamako; Ecole Nationale Supérieure
- Occupations: Puppeter and storyteller

Yaya Coulibaly (born in 1959) is a Malian puppet designer, puppeteer and storyteller from Mali.

== Early life ==
Born into a family of puppeteers, with roots in the Bambara, he began his initiation in the puppet and masquerade figures at the age of ten as an apprentice to his father. Later he studied art at the Institut National des Arts de Bamako, and puppet theatre at the Ecole Nationale Supérieure des Arts de la Marionnette in Charleville-Mézières, France.

== Career ==
In 1980 he formed his own puppet company, the Sogolon Puppet Troupe, and has since become the leading custodian of the Bambara puppetry tradition, the oldest and richest of Africa's surviving puppetry traditions. Coulibaly is the custodian of a vast collection of puppets, many of which have come down to him through his family. Speaking of his passion, Coulibaly said:

I depend on puppets, my family lives only for this. This is my bank, this is my territory, this is my book, this is all my domain and every day that God gives us.

Coulibaly has created a new and dynamic puppet theatre that draws from the ancient traditions of puppetry in West Africa. His performances incorporate traditional folk tales and legends and episodes from Mali's great epics, as well as colonial history and commentary on contemporary life in Mali. The techniques in his performances include hand puppets, rod puppets, marionettes, masks and live music. Sogolon has performed in Europe and the USA. A selection of this puppetry collection was exhibited in Germany, South Africa and USA.

== Sources ==
- Yaya Coulibaly, la passion des marionnettes by Bintou Fane - 13/06/2009, Le Journal du Mali
- Puppetry is the soul of the people of Mali, September 14, 2004, by Dawn Kennedy, Independent Online (South Africa)
- Puppeteers in Mali keep traditions alive for new generations, CNTV English web site, 07–10–2012
