= Ima (film) =

Film directed by Nils Tavernier

Ima is a 2022 French romantic comedy film directed by Nils Tavernier and co-written with Richard Bean and Laurent Bertoni, based on an original idea by the French-Congolese singer Dadju, who also stars in the lead role. The film was shot in Kinshasa, Democratic Republic of the Congo, and released theatrically in France on 11 May 2022.

== Plot ==
Dadju, a popular French music artist, returns to his native Kinshasa for a concert. Laetitia, one of his most devoted fans, is disappointed to learn that tickets are sold out. She convinces her father to pull strings through his wealthy employer to arrange a private performance. The businessman agrees, hoping to impress Ima, Laetitia's sister. During this intimate concert, Dadju is instantly drawn to Ima, setting the stage for a cross-cultural romance.

== Cast ==
- Dadju as himself
- Karidja Touré as Ima
- Djimo as Wilson
- Anzor Alem as Anzor
- Rebecca Juliana Ilunga as Laetitia
- Nick Mukoko as Yavan
- Joss Stinson as Joss

== Production ==
The film was officially announced in July 2021 during the Cannes Film Festival, where Dadju revealed he was preparing his acting debut in a romantic comedy directed by Nils Tavernier. Filming began later that month in Kinshasa and was completed in approximately 30 days. The production faced logistical challenges, including curfews due to the COVID-19 pandemic and extreme weather conditions.

The cast was gradually revealed over several months. In February 2022, actress Karidja Touré joined the project, followed by comedian Djimo in April 2022.

== Release ==
The first trailer for Ima was released in March 2022. The film premiered on 5 May 2022 at the Gaumont Champs-Élysées cinema in Paris and had its nationwide release in France on 11 May 2022.

== Music ==
The original soundtrack was composed by Dadju, along with Meïr Salah and Yaacov Salah. Music plays a central role in the film, blending narrative and performance elements to reflect Dadju's musical identity.

== Reception ==
Ima received mixed reviews from critics. Véronique Cauhapé of Le Monde described it as "a photo-novel for fans of the rapper," while Nicolas Didier of Télérama noted that the film "turns into an exercise in self-celebration," criticizing its flat direction and missed musical opportunities.
