= The Young Girl =

1975 film

- Directed by: Souleymane Cissé
- Written by: Souleymane Cissé; Hamadi Jalo; Isa Baba Tarawelle
- Produced by: Souleymane Cissé
- Starring: Dounamba Dany Coulibaly; Fanta Diabate
- Cinematography: Mariselen Jara
- Edited by: Andrée Davanture
- Music by: Wandé Kuyaté
- Production company: Cissé Films
- Distributed by: trigon-film
- Release date: 1975
- Running time: 88 minutes
- Country: Mali
- Language: Bambara

The Young Girl (Den muso) is a 1975 Malian film, directed by Souleymane Cissé.

== Plot ==
A young mute woman is raped and becomes pregnant, with disastrous consequences within her family. The film also sketches the social/economic situation in urban Mali in the 1970s, particularly in relation to the treatment with women.

== Cast ==
- Dounamba Dany Coulibaly
- Fanta Diabate
- Omou Diarra
- Balla Moussa Keita
- Mamoulou Sanogo
