= Paris: XY =

2001 film by Zeka Laplaine

- Directed by: Zeka Laplaine
- Produced by: Ahmat Mahamat
- Starring: Zeka Laplaine; Sylvia Vaudano; Emil Abossolo-Mbo
- Music by: Papa Monteiro
- Release date: September 10, 2001 (Toronto International Film Festival)
- Running time: 80 minutes
- Country: Democratic Republic of the Congo
- Language: French

Paris: XY is a 2001 film directed by Zeka Laplaine.

== Plot ==
Max is a tailor from the Congo living in Paris who neglects his wife and children while he works long hours, then haunts the bars, flirting with lonely women. Max wakes up one morning and discovers that his wife, Helen, had left him while he was sleeping, without a word, taking their two children with her. He does not understand. The nights stretch out. He wrestles with his demons to find reality, probes his feeling, analyzes the artificiality of his life. He finally rediscovers his love for Helen, but it is too late to win her back.

== Production ==
The director, who is also the lead actor, comes from the Democratic Republic of the Congo. This is his second feature film. Although the protagonist is African, his wife is white. Zeka Laplaine chose to shoot the film in grainy black and white. The film was produced with the help of the Fonds francophone de production audiovisuelle du Sud.

== Reception ==
Le Monde said that this intimate film of daily life is one that will arouse either sympathy or irritation. Afrik.com said that the film delivers an equation of sad love with Paris providing a warm background. Time Out Film Guide said that "While some of the editing's a touch clumsy, there's an air of spontaneity about the b/w camerawork".

== Cast ==
- Sylvia Vaudano as Hélène
- Zeka Laplaine as Max
- Pilou Ioua as Paco
- Lisa Edmondson as Keba
- Anna Garfein as Elvire
- Sabine Bail as Joséphine / La vendeuse
- Kudzo Do Tobias as Kanga the doc gynéco (gynecologist)
- Victor Wagner as Le père d'Hélène (Hélène's father)
- Moussa Sene Absa as Le voyant (the psychic)
- Hervé Husson as Hervé
- Elisabeth Landwerlin as Marie
- Sylvie Bataillard as La serveuse d'Elvire
- Emile Abossolo M'bo as Kalala Wa Kalala
