= Union of Creators and Entrepreneurs of the Cinema and Audiovisual Industries of Western Africa =

The Union of Creators and Entrepreneurs of the Cinema and Audiovisual Industries of Western Africa (French: Union des créateurs et entrepreneurs du cinéma et de l'audiovisuel de l'Afrique de l'Ouest, UCECAO) is an organization for cinema professionals in West Africa.

The cofounder and president of UCECAO is the Malian film director Souleymane Cissé. The organization was created at meetings in Bamako, Mali, on 31 March 1996 and 13 January 1997. The organization is based in Bamako.
