= Rumba Royale =

2025 Congolese film

- Promotional poster
- Directed by: Yohane Dean Lengol; Hamed Mobasser
- Written by: Kevin Dwyer
- Produced by: Kevin Dwyer; Marie G Sambay; Eric Mukuna; Eric Kasongo; Emmanuel Lupia; Alain Ilunga Tshovo; Ronny Law
- Starring: Fally Ipupa; Mélanie Bokata; Olivier Loustau; Cécile Djunga; Patrick Kabundi; Anzor Alem; Hénoc Kyombo
- Cinematography: Ronny Law
- Distributed by: Pathé Touch Afrique
- Release date: 12 December 2025
- Country: Democratic Republic of Congo
- Language: French

Rumba Royale is a 2025 Congolese historical thriller film co-directed by Yohane Dean Lengol and Hamed Mobasser, starring Fally Ipupa, Mélanie Bokata, Olivier Loustau, Cécile Djunga, Patrick Kabundi, Hénoc Kyombo, and Anzor Alem. The film is set in 1959 in Léopoldville (now Kinshasa), just before the Democratic Republic of Congo gained its independence from Belgium. It explores the interplay between political awakening and the cultural scene of Congolese rumba, portrayed through the vibrant nightlife of the city.

The film was selected as the Democratic Republic of the Congo's entry for the Best Foreign Language Film at the 99th Academy Awards.

== Synopsis ==
Set in the final year of colonial rule, Rumba Royale unfolds in a rumba nightclub in Léopoldville. As independence approaches, locals and colonial figures clash over politics, art, and identity. A bohemian photographer, Danel (played by Fally Ipupa), navigates these tensions while documenting the changing times.

== Cast ==
- Fally Ipupa as Danel
- Mélanie Bokata as Olive
- Olivier Loustau as Jean-Pierre
- Cécile Djunga as Amandine
- Patrick Kabundi as Sese
- Hénoc Kyombo as Albert
- Diane Uwamahoro as Louise
- Coline Fouquet as Delphine

== Production ==
The film was produced by Kevin Dwyer (Rodeo Chameleon Productions), Marie G Sambay, Eric Mukuna, Eric Kasongo (Emotive Productions), Emmanuel Lupia (Tosala Films), Alain Ilunga Tshovo (1986 Corp.), and Ronny Law. Pathé Touch Afrique, formerly Pathé BC Afrique, also co-produced and holds pan-African distribution rights.

According to the directors, the film was conceived as a tribute to Congolese culture and African cinema. Mobasser and Lengol described it as “a love letter to the Congo, Congolese rumba, and African cinema.”

== See also ==
- List of submissions to the 99th Academy Awards for Best International Feature Film
- List of Democratic Republic of the Congo submissions for the Academy Award for Best International Feature Film
