= Institut National des Arts de Bamako =

Art school in Bamako, Mali

- Institut National des Arts, Bamako, 1972
- Established: 1933
- Focus: Visual and performing arts; Traditional crafts
- Formerly called: Ecole Artisanale du Soudan; Maison des artisans du Soudan; Institut National des Arts (INA); Maison des artisans du Mali; Maison des Artisans de Bamako
- Address: Boulevard Du Peuple
- Location: Bamako Bagadadji, Bamako, Mali
- Coordinates: 12°38′44″N 7°59′38″W

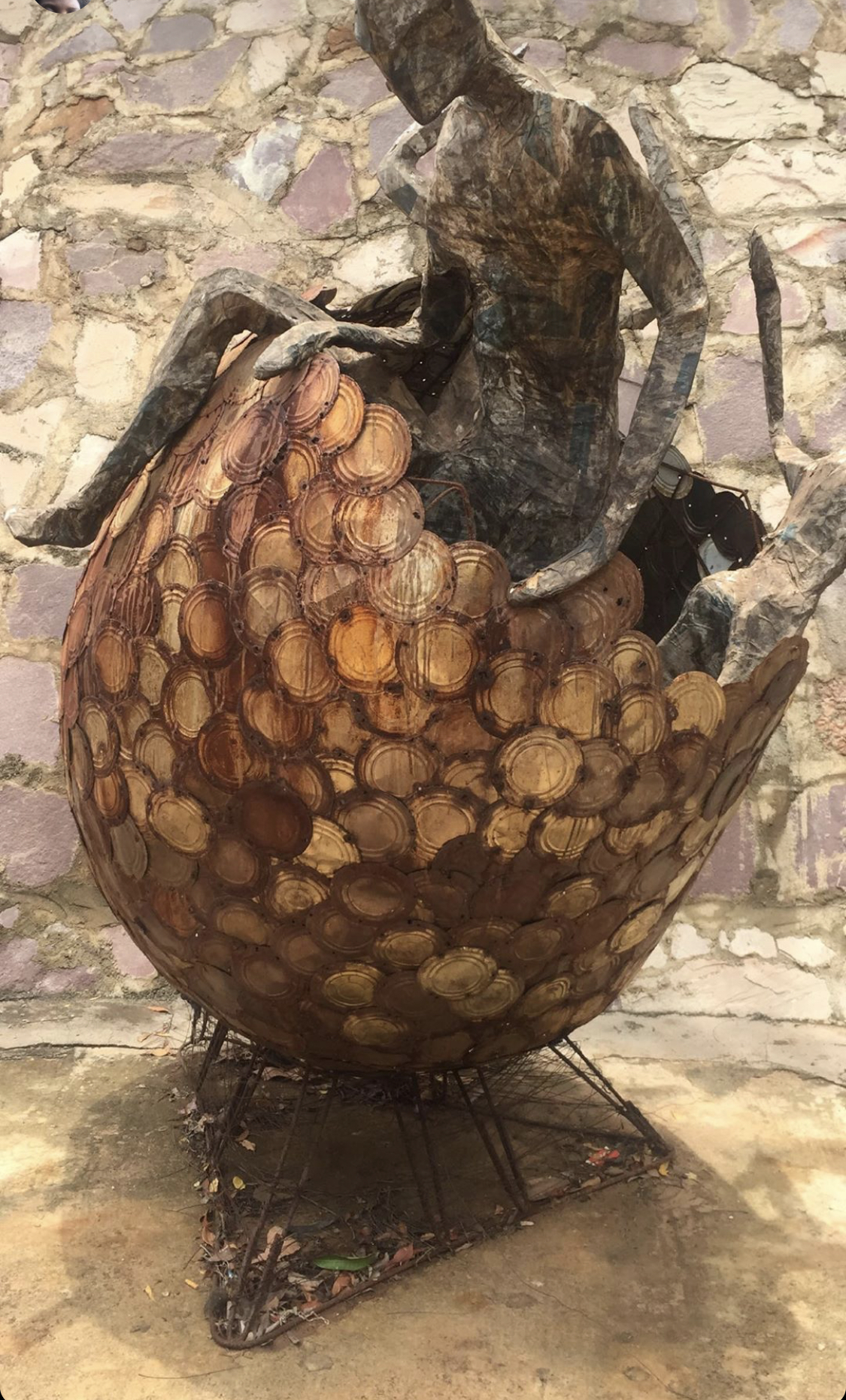
Sculpture at the Institut National des Arts, Bamako, 2019.

The Institut National des Arts de Bamako (INA) is a national school for the arts in Bamako, Mali. It was the only school of its kind in Mali until 2004. Originally set up to train Sudanese artisans, it now offers courses in jewellery making and design, illustration, painting, sculpture, photography, music, and theatre. It has produced many of Mali’s most well-known artists and has hosted numerous exhibitions, workshops, and performances.

== Naming ==
Over the history of its existence, many changes have affected the institute, including course offerings, faculty, and its name. Since its inception it has been known by many previous names including:

- (1933) Ecole Artisanale du Soudan
- (1948) Maison des artisans du Soudan
- (1963) Institut National des Arts (Law No. 63-98 / ANRM)
- (1986) Maison des artisans du Mali (Law No. 86-93 / ANRM)
- (2006) Maison des Artisans de Bamako

Notably, any reference to Sudan was removed from its name, reflecting the changing politics and identity of the country, as the former Sudanese Republic became the Republic of Mali in 1960.

Streetview of the facade of the Institut National des Arts, Bamako, 1984.

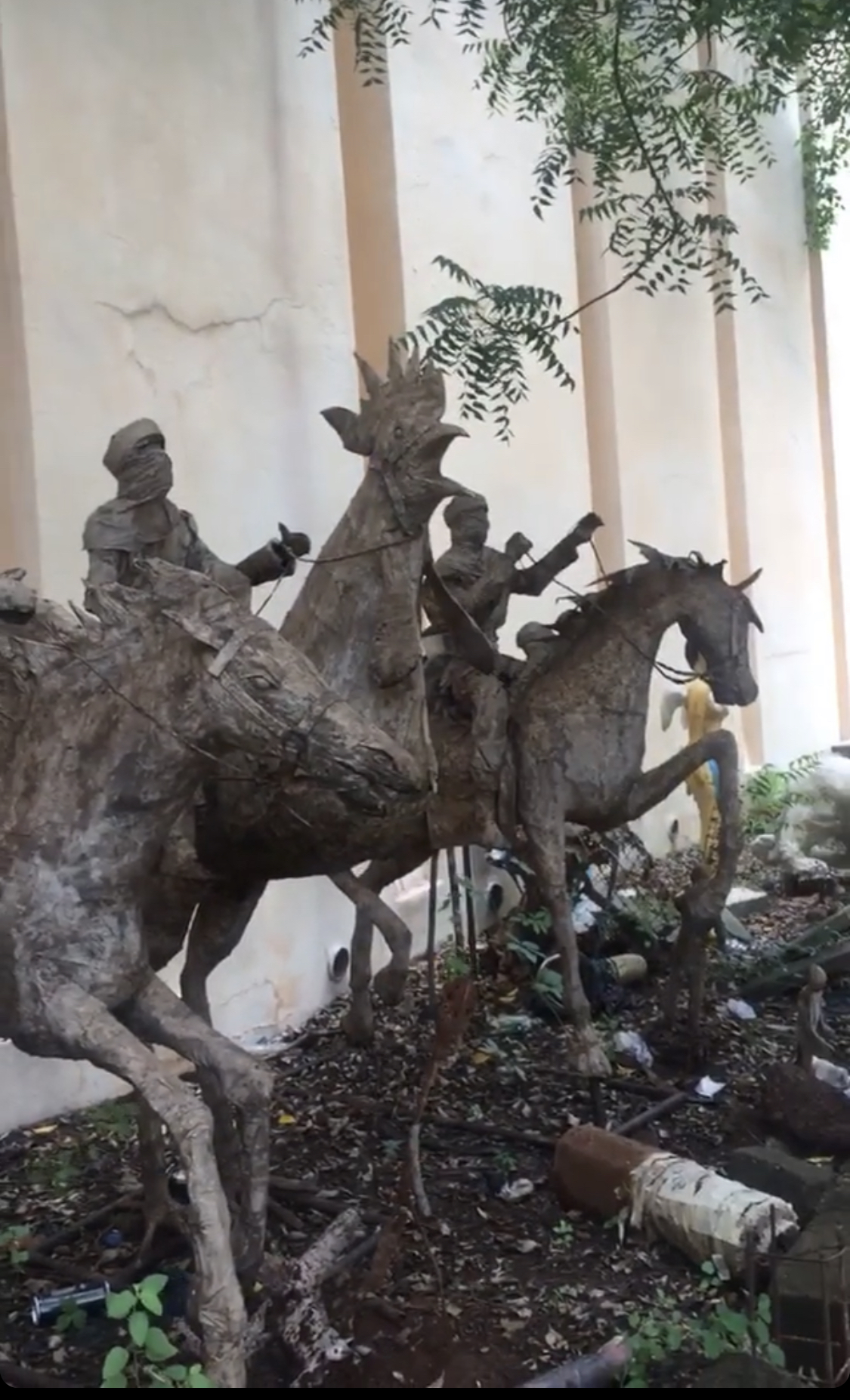
Sculptures at the Institut National des Arts, Bamako, 2019.

== Modern times ==
In 2013, a large fire destroyed many of the craftsmen's shops and wares in the surrounding area.

By 2015, it was run by a management committee, elected for three years and contained 89 souks and workshops for many crafts.

Commonly tourist guides will recommend a visit to the area to view the craftsmen working and to buy crafts from the market. Accordingly, it receives more than sixty thousand (60,000) tourists annually.

== Notable alumni ==
- Yaya Coulibaly (puppeteer)
- Habib Dembélé (actor)
- Ismael Diabate (artist)
- Amahiguere Dolo (artist)
- Habib Koité (musician)
- Abdoulaye Konaté (artist)
- Malick Sidibé (photographer)
- Salif Traoré (photographer)
