= Anzor Alem =

Congolese actor and singer (born 2001)

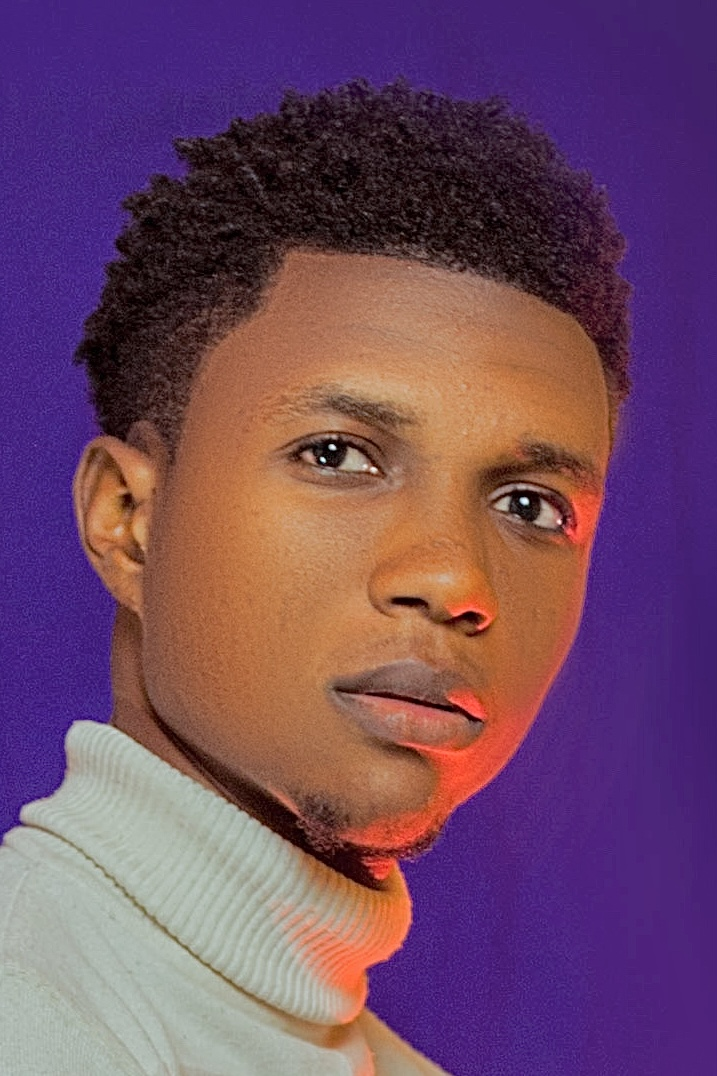
- Alem in 2021
- Born: Rashidi Alema Anzor; 4 April 2001 (age 25); Kisangani, Democratic Republic of the Congo
- Occupations: Actor, singer
- Years active: 2015–present

Rashidi Alema Anzor (born 4 April 2001) is a Congolese film and theatre actor and singer. He is best known for his roles in Baby Boy of the House, Ima, and Tozoom. He also made a brief guest appearance in the 2022 survival thriller Beast, starring Idris Elba.

== Early life ==
Rashidi Alema Anzor was born on 4 April 2001 in Kisangani, Democratic Republic of Congo. He is the eldest of four children, with three younger sisters. During his childhood, his family moved to Goma, where he spent part of his early years. After the divorce of his parents, he relocated with his mother and sisters to Lubumbashi, where he spent much of his adolescence.

== Career ==
In early 2025, Alem postponed the release of his debut album following a major data loss and a desire to refocus his creative direction. The announcement was covered by several international outlets, including BroadwayWorld, News Ghana, GhanaMusic, and NationalWorld.

Asaase Radio described Alem’s career as a cross-cultural trajectory between Goma and Casablanca, suggesting it challenges conventional boundaries of African Afrobeats. According to the Daily Herald, his work has attracted attention from musical groups in the United States.

== Filmography ==
Year	Title	Role	Notes
2022	Baby Boy Of House	Baby Boy	Short film
2022	Ima	Anzor	Film
2022	Tozoom	Clovers Tomas	Film
2024	The White Blood	Stony White	Film
2025	Rumba Royale	Drill	Film
