= Telephone numbers in Mali =

- Country: Mali
- Continent: Africa
- NSN length: 8
- Format: XXXX XXXX
- Country code: +223
- International access: 00
- Long-distance: n/a

The following are the telephone codes in Mali.

== Calling formats ==
To call Mali, the following format is used: +223 XXXX XXXX.

Calls within Mali use 8 digits and there are no area codes.

== List of allocations in Mali ==
In the notation below, 'M', 'C', 'D', and 'U' stand for thousands, hundreds, tens, and units, respectively.

List of fixed allocations
| New number | District | Operator |
|---|---|---|
| 202Q MCDU | District of Bamako | SOTELMA |
| 2020 MCDU | District of Bamako | SOTELMA |
| 2021 MCDU | District of Bamako | SOTELMA |
| 2022 MCDU | District of Bamako | SOTELMA |
| 2023 MCDU | District of Bamako | SOTELMA |
| 2024 MCDU | District of Bamako | SOTELMA |
| 2025 MCDU | District of Bamako | SOTELMA |
| 2028 MCDU | District of Bamako | SOTELMA |
| 2029 MCDU | District of Bamako | SOTELMA |
| 2072 MCDU | District of Bamako | SOTELMA |
| 2077 MCDU | District of Bamako | SOTELMA |
| 2078 MCDU | District of Bamako | SOTELMA |
| 2079 MCDU | CDMA Bamako | SOTELMA |
| 2126 MCDU | Region of Koulikoro | SOTELMA |
| 2127 MCDU | Region of Koulikoro | SOTELMA |
| 213Q MCDU | Region of Ségou | SOTELMA |
| 214Q MCDU | Region of Mopti | SOTELMA |
| 215Q MCDU | Region of Kayes | SOTELMA |
| 216Q MCDU | Region of Sikasso | SOTELMA |
| 218Q MCDU | Region of Gao | SOTELMA |
| 218Q MCDU | Region of Kidal | SOTELMA |
| 219Q MCDU | Region of Tombouctou | SOTELMA |
| 442Q MCDU | District of Bamako | malitel MALI |

List of mobile allocations
| New number | Operator | New number | Operator |
|---|---|---|---|
| 650X XXXX; 651X XXXX; 652X XXXX; 653X XXXX; 654X XXXX; 655X XXXX; 656X XXXX; 657X XXXX; 658X XXXX; 659X XXXX; 660X XXXX; 661X XXXX; 662X XXXX; 663X XXXX; 664X XXXX; 665X XXXX; 666X XXXX; 667X XXXX; 668X XXXX; 669X XXXX; 690X XXXX; 691X XXXX; 692X XXXX; 693X XXXX; 694X XXXX; 695X XXXX; 696X XXXX; 697X XXXX; 698X XXXX; 699X XXXX | SOTELMA/MALITEL | 701X.XXXX; 702X.XXXX; 703X.XXXX; 704X.XXXX; 705X.XXXX; 706X.XXXX; 707X.XXXX; 708X.XXXX; 709X.XXXX; 730X XXXX; 731X XXXX; 732X XXXX; 733X XXXX; 734X XXXX; 740X XXXX; 741X XXXX; 744X XXXX; 745X XXXX; 746X XXXX; 747X XXXX; 750X XXXX; 751X XXXX; 752X XXXX; 753X XXXX; 754X XXXX; 760X XXXX; 761X XXXX; 762X XXXX; 763X XXXX; 764X XXXX; 765X XXXX; 766X XXXX; 767X XXXX; 768X XXXX; 769X XXXX; 770X XXXX; 771X XXXX; 772X XXXX; 773X XXXX; 774X XXXX; 781X XXXX; 782X XXXX; 783X XXXX; 784X XXXX; 785X XXXX; 786X XXXX; 787X XXXX; 788X XXXX; 789X XXXX; 790X XXXX; 791X XXXX; 792X XXXX; 793X XXXX; 794X XXXX | ORANGE MALI |

Special numbers
| Allocated to | Old number | New number | Operator |
|---|---|---|---|
| Free phone | 8 001 | 80 001 | Sotelma |
| Free phone | 8 002 | 80 002 | Orange Mali |
| Numéro azur | 8 011 | 80 011 | Sotelma |
| Numéro azur | 8 012 | 80 012 | Orange Mali |
| Numéro indigo | 8 021 | 80 021 | Sotelma |
| Numéro indigo | 8 022 | 80 022 | Orange Mali |

The new number plan took effect in 2008.

== General rules ==
Changes in 2008
| Type | Old number | New number | Zone | Operator |
|---|---|---|---|---|
| Fixed | 2 2QMCDU (Q = 0, 1, 2, 3, 4, 8, 9) | 20 2QMCDU | District of Bamako | Sotelma |
| Fixed | 2 2QMCDU (Q = 5, 6, 7) | 21 2QMCDU | Region of Koulikoro | Sotelma |
| Fixed | 2 PQMCDU (P = 3, 4, 5, 6, 7, 8, 9) | 21 PQMCDU | Regions 3, 4, 5, 6, 7, 8, 9 | Sotelma |
| Fixed | 2 7QMCDU | 20 7QMCDU | CDMA Bamako | Sotelma |
| Fixed | 2 7QMCDU | 21 7QMCDU | CDMA Regions | Sotelma |
| Fixed | 4 PQMCDU (P = 2, 3, 9) | 44 PQMCDU | District of Bamako | Orange Mali |
| Mobile GSM network | BPQMCDU (P = 5, 6, 7, 8, 9) | 6 BPQMCDU | | Sotelma (Malitel) |
| Mobile GSM network | BPQMCDU (P = 0, 1, 2, 3, 4) | 7 BPQMCDU | | Orange Mali |
| Short numbers | 7XY/7XYZ | 357XY/35XYZ | | Sotelma |
| Short numbers | 7XYZ | 37XYZ | | Orange Mali |
| Long numbers VAS | 8PQMCDU | 80 PQMCDU | | All operators |

== See also ==
- Telecommunications in Mali
