= Abdoulaye Konaté =

Malian artist (born 1953)

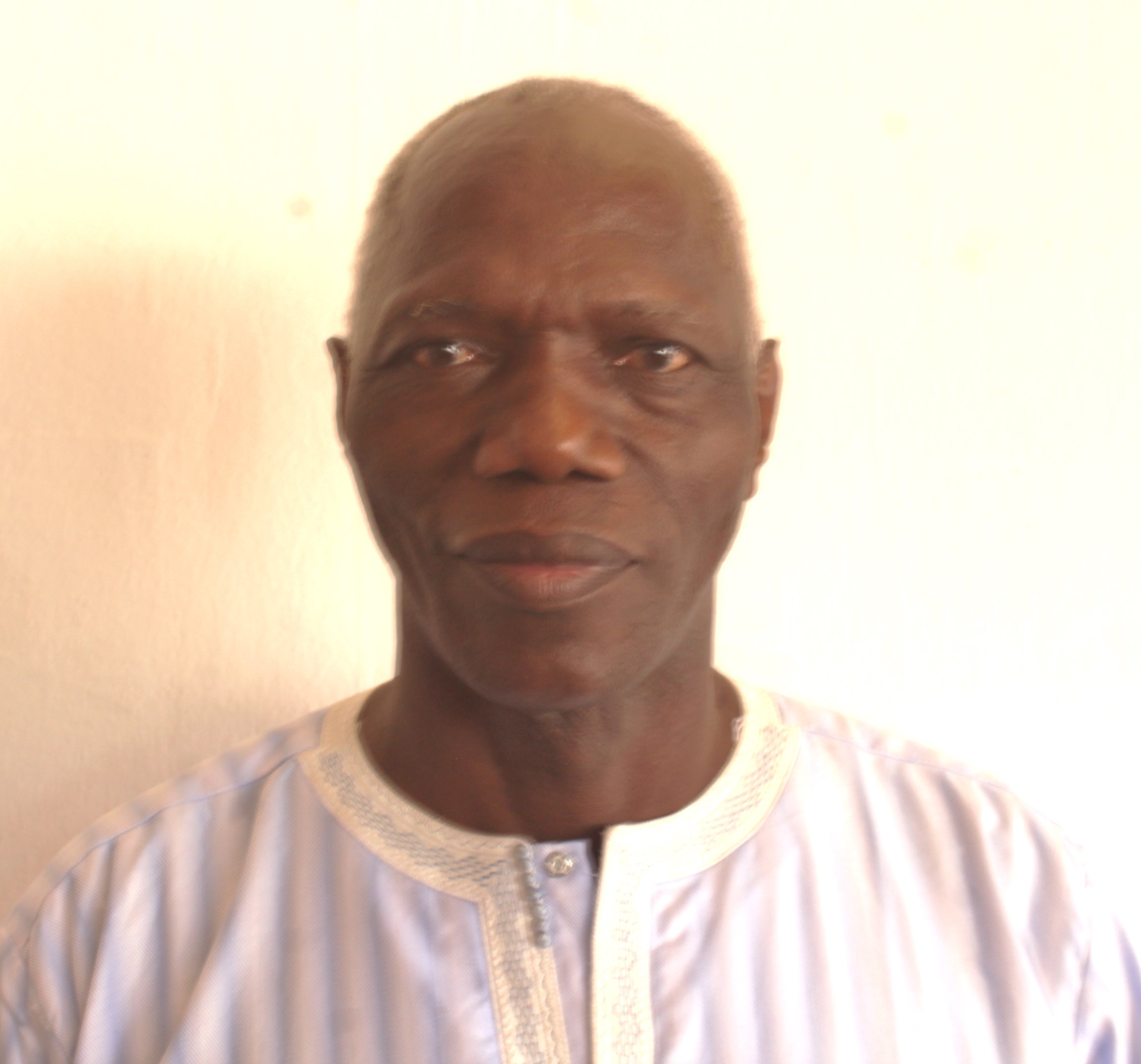
- Born: February 1, 1953 (age 73); Diré, Mali
- Education: Institut National des Arts de Bamako
- Occupations: Graphic designer; painter; installation artist; sculptor

Abdoulaye Konaté (born 1 February 1953) is a Malian artist. He was born in Diré and lives and works in Bamako.

Konaté studied painting at the Institut National des Arts de Bamako and then at the Instituto Superior de Arte, Havana, Cuba.

== Early life ==
Konaté was born 1 February 1953 in the northern town of Diré in Mali. He studied and graduated at the Institut National des Arts de Bamako between the times of 1972 to 1976 with a degree in painting. He then moved to Havana, Cuba from 1978 - 1985 to further his art education at the Superior de Arte, Havana, Cuba (Higher Institute of Plastic Arts). During his time in Cuba he discovered multidisciplinary art. This left a long impression on him. Konaté used acrylic to paint a multitude of work. in the 1990's Konaté switched from traditional painting to tapestry. His tapestries are shown in galleries all over the world today.

== Career ==
Konaté worked as a graphic designer at the Musee National in Bamako. In 1998, he was appointed to be the Director of the Palais de la Culture. He now works as the principal of the Conservatoire des Arts et Métiers Multimédia Balla Fasseké Kouyaté in Bamako, Mali.

He and his work have received several awards, including in 2002 the Chevalier de l'Ordre National du Mali and Chevalier de l'Ordre des Arts et des Lettres de France.

== Exhibitions ==
=== Solo shows ===
- 2013- Abdoulaye Konaté - Primo Marella Gallery Milan, Milan
- 2011- Abdoulaye Konaté: Window Commission 2011 - Institute of International Visual Arts - iniva, London
- 2009- Textiles - Heidelberger Forum für Kunst, Heidelberg
- 1999- Abdoulaye Konaté - Tuchbilder + Installation - Dany Keller Galerie - Munich, Munich

=== Group shows ===
2014

- Destination...1:54: Contemporary African Art - Primo Marella Gallery Milan, Milan
- The Divine Comedy. Heaven, Purgatory and Hell Revisited by Contemporary African Artists -Museum für Moderne Kunst (MMK), Frankfurt/Main2013
- Decorum - Musée d´Art Moderne de la Ville de Paris - MAM/ARC, Paris
- Hollandaise - Raw Material Company, Dakar

2012

- Hollandaise - Stedelijk Museum Bureau Amsterdam - SMBA, Amsterdam
- Moving Into Space: Football and Art in West Africa - National Football Museum, Manchester
- We Face Forward: Art from West Africa Today - Manchester Art Gallery, Manchester

2010

- Africa, Assume Art Position! - Primo Marella Gallery Milan, Milan
- Textiles - Fondation Jean Paul Blachere, Apt
- Dak’Art 2010 - Dak’Art 1990 > 2010 : rétrospective et perspectives - Dak'Art Biennale de l’art africain contemporain, Dakar

2009 10. Bienal de La Habana - La Bienal de La Habana, Havana

2008

- INPUT - Colecção Sindika Dokolo - Museu Nacional de História Natural, Luanda
- Travesía - Centro Atlántico de Arte Moderno (CAAM), Las Palmas de Gran Canaria
- 7th Gwangju Biennale - Gwangju Biennale, Gwangju
- Angaza Afrika - African Art Now - October Gallery, London
- Artes Mundi 3 - National Museum Cardiff, Cardiff, Wales

2007

- Brocken Memory - Ghana National Art Museum, Accra
- Contact Zone - Musée National du Mali, Bamako
- Africa Remix - Contemporary art of a continent - Johannesburg Art Gallery (JAG), Johannesburg
- Documenta 12 - Documenta, Kassel

2006

- Trienal de Luanda 2007 - Trienal de Luanda, Luanda
- 2° Bienal Internacional de Arte Contemporáneo de Sevilla - BIACS - Fundación Bienal Internacional de Arte Contemporáneo de Sevilla, Sevilla
- Africa Remix - Moderna Museet, Stockholm
- SD Observatorio - IVAM - Institut Valencià d'Art Modern, Valencia
- Africa Remix - Contemporary Art of a Continent - Mori Art Museum, Tokyo
- 7ème Biennale de l´Art Africain contemporain - Dak'Art Biennale de l’art africain contemporain, Dakar

2005

- African Remix - l'art contemporain d'un continent - Centre Pompidou - Musée National d´Art Moderne, Paris
- Africa Remix – Contemporary Art of a Continent - Hayward Gallery, London

2004 Afrika Remix - Zeitgenössische Kunst eines Kontinents - Museum Kunstpalast, Dusseldorf

1998 24° Bienal de São Paulo - Bienal de Sao Paulo, São Paulo

1997 Die Anderen Modernen : Zeitgenössische Kunst aus Afrika, Asien und Lateinamerika - Haus der Kulturen der Welt, Berlin

== Influences ==
Combining his painting skills with installation work, he comments on political and environmental affairs. The encroachment of the Sahel and the impact of AIDS on society and on individuals have been two major themes in his work.

His questioning of the political, social, and economic scenes in contemporary Mali is evident in how AIDS, wars, ecological issues, human rights, and globalization affects all aspects of life and individuals within society. Much of his large-scale work is textile-based, a medium that is more readily available than paints.

== Artes Mundi ==
In 2008 Konaté was nominated for the Artes Mundi prize. His exhibition included pieces such as Les Marcheurs and Tafo ou la force du verbe.

== Literature ==
La toile d'Abdoulaye Konaté / Joëlle Busca. - Bamako, Mali, Ministère de la culture et Dakar, Senegal, Galerie nationale d'art, 2011.

Abdoulaya Konaté / edited by Camilla Jalving ... [et al.]. - London, BlainSouthern and Ishøj, Arken, 2016.
