= The Wind (1982 film) =

1982 film

- Directed by: Souleymane Cissé
- Written by: Souleymane Cissé
- Produced by: Souleymane Cissé
- Starring: Fousseyni Sissoko
- Cinematography: Étienne Carton de Grammont
- Edited by: Andrée Davanture
- Release date: May 1982
- Running time: 100 minutes
- Country: Mali
- Language: Bambara

The Wind (Bambara: Finye; French: Le Vent) is a 1982 Malian drama film directed by Souleymane Cissé. It was screened in the Un Certain Regard section at the 1982 Cannes Film Festival.

== Plot ==
The film follows a group of students protesting for change in Mali and the explosive consequences. Batrou, the daughter of military governor Sangaré, and Bah, the son of local chieftain Kansaye, are lovers. Bah is worried about his school exams and takes some pills to help him study, along with his friend Seydou. Batrou passes the exams but Bah fails and gets high on weed with his fellow students. It is implied that the exam and entire school system is corrupt. Bah seems to imagine a little boy with a bowl of water next to a river, blessing Bah and Batrou in some kind of ceremony.

Bah's grandfather Kansaye has a difficult relationship with him and does not approve of his lifestyle. He nearly beats him, but for his wife's intervention. Meanwhile, Sangaré does beat his third wife, who is close in age to Batrou, for talking back to him.

Sangaré wants Batrou to study in France and is furious at her relationship with Bah. He warns her not to involve herself in the upcoming student protests. Bah helps other students with printing flyers for the protests. The police raid the room with a smoke bomb and arrest the students. Bah hides in a cupboard and escapes, coming to the protests the next day. He is arrested when the police arrive, along with several others. Batrou manages to evade the police but hands herself in when two local women are arrested for trying to help her.

Sangaré refuses to have his daughter released and she is put to work sweeping, whilst the male students have their heads shaved and are put to hard labour. Seydou is already unwell and dies from the harsh conditions. Sangaré offers to let the students go if they sign a statement presumably retracting their protests but Bah refuses and stays imprisoned.

Batrou also speaks out against it and is taken away, although she is released at some unknown point after. She goes to Kansaye, Bah's chieftain grandfather, to beg forgiveness. Kansaye forgives her and then goes to a tribal shrine to ask his ancestors for help in bringing Bah home. The voice of his ancestors says they do not have the power to help. Kansaye goes to Sangaré and threatens him with a shotgun if Bah is not released. Sangaré tries to shoot Kansaye but the bullets have no effect.

Kansaye's house is raided by the police. In great anguish, he burns his ceremonial clothes. He then tells the young people where he lives that he will support their protests.

The central Malian government becomes concerned about the optics of the growing protests. Sangaré is ordered to release the students and the film ends with Bah leaving prison. The little boy with the bowl of water by the river is briefly seen again.

== Cast ==
- Fousseyni Sissoko - Bah
- Goundo Guissé - Batrou
- Balla Moussa Keïta - The gouvenor Sangaré
- Ismaila Sarr - Bah's grandfather
- Omou Diarra - The third spouse
- Ismaila Cissé - Seydou
- Massitan Ballo - Bah's mother
- Dioncounda Kone - Bah's grandmother
- Yacouba Samabaly - La commissaire de police
- Dounamba Dany Coulibaly - The woman Peul
- Oumou Koné
