= Guimba the Tyrant =

- DVD cover
- Directed by: Cheick Oumar Sissoko
- Written by: Cheick Oumar Sissoko
- Produced by: Idrissa Ouedraogo; Sophie Salbot (executive producer)
- Starring: Fatoumata Coulibaly; Habibou Dembélé; Lamine Diallo; Maimouna Hélène Diarra; Balla Moussa Keita; Cheick Oumar Maiga; Mouneissa Maiga; Fabola Issa Traoré
- Cinematography: Lionel Cousin
- Edited by: Kahéna Attia; Joëlle Dufour
- Music by: Michel Risse; Pierre Sauvageot
- Distributed by: Kora Films; California Newsreel
- Release date: 1995
- Running time: 93 minutes
- Countries: Mali; France; Germany
- Languages: Bambara; Fula

Guimba the Tyrant (French: Guimba, un tyran, une époque) is a 1995 Malian comedy drama film in the Bambara language (with some Fula language components), directed by noted Malian director Cheick Oumar Sissoko. The movie shows the rise and fall of a cruel and despotic village chief, Guimba, and his son Jangine in a fictional village in the Sahel of Mali. Some of the storytelling is done through the village griot, and with the film being placed in an old setting, this lends an epic touch to the movie. The exact chronological setting of the movie is difficult to ascertain, since it is set in an isolated village, but the commonly used weaponry shown is the blunderbuss. However, one scene outside the village features a neem tree, a species introduced to Africa in the colonial period. The film has some magical components, including a solar eclipse brought on by magic. Casting was only partially done from professional actors.

The film has well-designed, colorful and exotic props, costumes and sets. It has evoked mixed responses from critics, and been lauded for its visual beauty. Slapstick comedy is present throughout the movie, as is comedy through the actions of the griot. The screenplay also contains numerous interesting African adages. The movie soundtrack contains music sung in old dialects using ancient instruments.

Some critics have found elements of political satire in the film, due to director Oumar Sissoko's resistance to Malian dictator Moussa Traoré.

== Plot ==
The film opens with a village griot reciting the story of Guimba the tyrant, of the Dunbuya family. The setting moves to an old Malian village ruled by the evil and tyrannical leader Guimba and his dwarf son Janguine. Janguine has been betrothed from childhood to the village beauty Kani from the Diarra family - the other powerful family in the village. Janguine, however, has his eyes on Kani's well-endowed mother Meya, and hence Guimba offers to marry Kani, asking Kani's father for a divorce so that Janguine can marry Meya. When he refuses, he is banished from the village. Protests break out, leading to various killings and subjugation.

As the village gets embroiled in a civil war, Kani manages to escape to her father's camp on horseback with Guimba unsuccessfully giving chase. Guimba's slave is also welcomed into the rebel camp. She is dressed up provocatively and sent back to the village, causing both Guimba and Janguine to fall for her. Guimba kills his son, and chases after the woman out of the village and into a trap - leading to his downfall.

== Awards ==
- Grand prize, FESPACO (Pan African Film Festival of Ouagadougou) - 1995
