= Waati =

1995 film

- Directed by: Souleymane Cissé
- Written by: Souleymane Cissé
- Produced by: Xavier Castano
- Starring: Sidi Yaya Cissé
- Cinematography: Jean-Jacques Bouhon; Vincenzo Marano; Georgi Rerberg
- Release date: May 1995
- Running time: 140 minutes
- Country: Mali
- Language: Bambara

Waati is a 1995 Malian drama film directed by Souleymane Cissé. It was entered into the 1995 Cannes Film Festival.

== Cast ==
- Sidi Yaya Cissé - Solofa
- Mariame Amerou Mohamed Dicko - Nandi at 6 years
- Balla Moussa Keita - Teacher
- Vusi Kunene
- Martin Le Maitre
- Eric Miyeni - The father
- Nakedi Ribane - The mother
- Adam Rose - Killer Policeman
- Niamanto Sanogo - Rastas' prophet
- Linèo Tsolo - Nandi
- Mary Twala - Grandmother
