= Le Journal du Mali =

French newspaper

- Type: Weekly newspaper
- Owner: Impact Média Presse SARL
- Founder: Mahamadou Camara
- Publisher: Impact Média Presse SARL
- Language: French
- Headquarters: Bamako, Mali
- Website: www.journaldumali.com

Le Journal du Mali is a French-language news website and weekly newspaper in Bamako, Mali. The newspaper is owned by Impact Média Presse SARL, which also owns the websites Journal du Faso and Journal d'Abidjan, among many other websites in west Africa, founded by Mahamadou Camara. The publisher is based in Bamako.
