= Abdramane Keïta =

Malian journalist

Abdramane Keïta is a Malian journalist. The editor-in-chief of the newspaper Le Témoin, he is known for his opposition to the 2012 Malian coup d'état and the subsequent establishment of a military junta.

== Career ==
Keïta became known as the managing editor of the biweekly newspaper L'Aurore, which was publicly opposed to the Malian Armed Forces-led coup against the government of Amadou Toumani Touré. By 2020, Keïta had become the editor-in-chief of the biweekly newspaper Le Témoin.

== 2012 abduction ==
On 2 July 2012, Keïta arranged to meet a source in western Bamako, who claimed to have information on the situation in northern Mali, where the Tuareg rebellion had recently taken place. Instead, he was met by a group of unidentified men in military uniforms, who accused him of "causing confusion in the country" through his opposition to the coup d'état. Keïta was subsequently abducted and assaulted by men; his personal items, including his wallet, were stolen before he was abandoned in the town of Senou in Koulikoro Region.

== 2026 arrest and imprisonment ==
In June 2026, Keïta appeared on the phone-in television programme Grand Jury, broadcast by Renouveau TV. He made comments that Jama'at Nusrat al-Islam wal-Muslimin, a united front of Salafi jihadist organisations in West Africa, controlled Kidal in northern Mali, with its leader Iyad Ag Ghali serving in a leadership capacity in the city. The fall of Kidal had been reported on in international media, though the Malian military did not accept that it no longer controlled the area.

On 9 June 2026, Keïta was summoned for questioning by the judicial unit responsible for investigating cybercrime in Bamako; he was subsequently arrested, with a prosecutor charging him with "undermining national unity and the credibility of the state" and placing him into pre-trial detention. Maison de la Presse, the Malian press association, confirmed that Keïta had been arrested in relation to his appearance on Grand Jury, and also noted that his arrest had occurred 24 hours after the arrest of Chahana Takiou, a television presenter and editor of the newspaper 22 Septembre.

While Keïta was detained, the Malian government filed a lawsuit against him requesting 1.5 million XOF in damages. His trial was scheduled to commence on 17 August 2026; Keïta's lawyers sought to have the charges dismissed. A hearing on 31 August was postponed for "judicial recess", coinciding with Mawlid. On 14 September 2026, following deliberations, Keïta was sentenced to three years in prison by a national cybercrime court, with one year suspended, with 1 million XOF in damages.

== Response ==
Human Rights Watch described Keïta's prosecution as reflecting a wider pattern of military figures seeking to "silence" journalists, as well as human rights activists and opposition figures, for public criticism and dissent. It called on Malian authorities to "immediately and unconditionally" release Keïta. The Media Foundation for West Africa had called for Keïta's release following his arrest. Reporters Without Borders called on Malian authorities to end its "repression of media professionals" and to release Keïta.
