= Fire! (1991 film) =

1991 film

- Film poster
- Directed by: Adama Drabo
- Written by: Adama Drabo
- Starring: Djeneba Diawara
- Cinematography: Lionel Cousin
- Edited by: Rose Evans
- Release date: 10 February 1991
- Running time: 100 minutes
- Country: Mali
- Language: Bambara

Fire! (Bambara: Ta Dona, French: Au feu!) is a 1991 Malian drama film directed by Adama Drabo. It was screened in the Un Certain Regard section at the 1991 Cannes Film Festival.

Ta Dona follows the story of Sidy, a Bambara young forest commissioner from the city, in Mali, who tries to stop a bush fires break out in a small village. Sidy has been trained in modern techniques. However, he accepts tradition and starts a journey into the Dogon country to find the seventh canari, an ancient herbal remedy for childbirth, believed to contain healing powers.

Through his journey, Sidy discovers that reforestation is the key to the future of his country.

== Cast ==
- Djeneba Diawara - Koro
- Mamadou Fomba
- Balla Moussa Keita - Fakoro (as Balamoussa Keïta)
- Diarrah Sanogo - Gnedjougou
- Fily Traoré - Sidy
