= Yeelen =

- VHS cover
- Directed by: Souleymane Cissé
- Written by: Souleymane Cissé
- Produced by: Souleymane Cissé
- Starring: Issiaka Kane; Aoua Sangare; Niamanto Sanogo
- Cinematography: Jean-Noël Ferragut; Jean-Michel Humeau
- Music by: Salif Keita; Michel Portal
- Release dates: May 1987 (Cannes); 14 April 1989 (US)
- Running time: 105 minutes
- Countries: Mali; Burkina Faso; France; West Germany
- Languages: Bambara, Fula

Yeelen (Bambara for "brightness"/"light") is a 1987 Malian film written, directed and produced by Souleymane Cissé. It is filmed in the Bambara and Fula languages, and is based on a legend told by the Bambara people. Though the era is undefined, it is presumably set in the 13th century in the Mali Empire and is a heroic quest narrative featuring magic and precognition.

Cissé has stated in an interview for Cahiers du Cinéma that it was "in part made in opposition to European ethnographic films” and that he “wanted to make a response to an external perception, a perception by white technicians and academics, an alien perception."

It stars Issiaka Kane as Nianankoro, a young African man who possesses magical powers. Niamanto Sanogo plays Nianankoro's father, who is tracking his son through the Bambara, Fulani and Dogon lands of West Africa using a magical wooden post to guide him.

== Plot ==
Nianankoro's father Soma is a part of the order of Komo, who practice magic, but he uses his powers for self-gain. He becomes determined to kill his son after receiving a vision that his son will cause his death. Aided by his mother, Nianankoro steals several of his father's sacred fetishes and leaves his village to seek out his uncle for help. Soma pursues him with the aid of an enchanted pylon that tracks his son's location and breaks all barriers that deter it.

As he travels, Nianankoro encounters a hyena who tells him his destiny is to be great. Passing through the territory of the Fulas, he is thought to be a thief and captured. Their king Rouma Boli orders him killed, but Nianankoro creates magic that freezes his guards and declares they cannot kill him. Impressed, King Rouma offers Nianankoro his freedom in exchange for aid against a rival tribe. When the tribe attacks, Nianankoro summons a swarm of bees and a fire that drives their attackers away. The king thanks Nianankoro and asks him to cure his wife Attou's infertility. Nianankoro creates an enchantment, but he and Attou are overcome by lust and sleep together. That night they return to Rouma to confess their crime, and the king reluctantly orders them married and to leave.

Nianankoro and Attou continue their travels while his father remains in pursuit. Soma sacrifices an albino man and a wild dog to appease the gods who grant him power to hunt his son. He then meets with the Komo and warns them that Nianankoro intends to disperse their magic for all the people to use. Nianankoro and Attou reach his uncle Djigui, who was blinded long ago when he chose to use the artifact of Kore's Wing for his people. He gives the relic to Nianankoro and tells him and Attou, who is pregnant, that their children will become a nation who will face hardship and be sold in slavery, but ultimately prosper. Taking Kore's wing, Nianankoro leaves to confront his father and gives his cloak to Attou to in turn give to his son. She takes refuge with Djigui as they prepare for incoming devastation.

Reaching his father, Nianankoro attempts to reason with him but is dismayed to find his father cannot bear to share his power and only wants him dead. They call upon the power of their artifacts, Soma with his pylon and Nianankoro with Kore's Wing, turning themselves into an elephant and a lion, respectively. The power of Kore creates a blinding wave that kills them both and transforms the land around them into sand. After their deaths, Attou and her young son come to the site and find two eggs. Her son takes the egg of his father and his mother gives him Kore's Wing, and they leave the desert.

== Cast ==
- Issiaka Kane - Nianankoro
- Aoua Sangare - Attou
- Niamanto Sanogo - Soma / Djigui
- Balla Moussa Keita - Rouma Boll, Fula king
- Soumba Traore - Mah
- Ismaila Sarr - Bofing
- Youssouf Tenin Cissé - Le petit garçon d'Attou
- Koke Sangare - Komo chief

== Accolades ==
Yeelen was met with wide critical success and has been called "conceivably the greatest African film ever made."

It was awarded the Jury Prize at the 1987 Cannes Film Festival, becoming the first African film to win a prize in the festival's history. It was also nominated for the Golden Palm award for the same year.

It was nominated for Best International Film at the 4th Independent Spirit Awards.

It was ranked #94 in Empire magazine's "The 100 Best Films Of World Cinema" in 2010.

== Reception ==
On the review aggregator website Rotten Tomatoes, 100% of 12 critics' reviews are positive. Jonathan Rosenbaum of The Chicago Reader calling Yeelen "extraordinarily beautiful and mesmerizing fantasy...Sublimely mixing the matter-of-fact with the uncanny, this wondrous work provides an ideal introduction to a filmmaker who is, next to Ousmane Sembene, probably Africa’s greatest director."

Richard Brody of The New Yorker praised it as "a masterwork of metaphysical realism," writing that "the [film's] title means 'brightness,' and it's ultimately the cosmic power of light itself that comes to the fore, by way of a terrifying conflagration. The filmmaker’s point of view, however, is steadfastly terrestrial and political: he dramatizes patriarchal abuses and the high price of resistance, however legitimate."

== See also ==
- List of Afrofuturist films
- Who Fears Death, a Nigerian book with similar subject matter

== Bibliography ==
- Samuel Lelièvre, La Lumière de Souleymane Cissé. Cinéma et Culture, Paris, L'Harmattan, 2013 (ISBN 978-2-343-00201-9).
