= Djibril Kouyaté =

Mali filmmaker and actor

Djibril Kouyaté جبريل كوياتي
- Born: Djibril Kouyaté; 1942 (age 83–84); Bamako, Mali
- Occupations: Director, assistant director, costume designer
- Years active: 1967–present

Djibril Kouyaté (Arabic: جبريل كوياتي born 1942), is a Malian filmmaker and actor. He is best known as the director of critically acclaimed feature films such as The return of Tieman, Tiefing and Walaha.

== Personal life ==
He was born in 1942 in Bamako, Mali.

== Career ==
In 1969, he made the maiden directorial debut with l'artisanat. Then he made the film Le retour de Tieman (1970), Le drapeau noir au sud du berceau (1976) and Le Mali aujourd'hui (1978). As an actor, he acted in the films: Verloren Maandag (1974), Ta Dona (1991), and Macadam tribu (1999). In 2000, he acted in the critically acclaimed film Code inconnu in which his character as 'Youssouf' was highly praised.

== Filmography ==
Year	Film	Role	Genre	Ref.
1969	l'artisanat (Arts and crafts)	director	Feature film	
1970	Le retour de Tieman (The return of Tieman)	director	Feature film	
1974	Verloren Maandag	actor	Feature film	
1976	Le drapeau noir au sud du berceau (The Black Flag South of The Cradle)	director	Feature film	
1978	Le Mali aujourd'hui (Mali today)	director	Feature film	
1991	Ta Dona (Your Dona)	actor: Samou	Feature film	
1992	Depte (Deposit)	director	Feature film	
1993	Tiefing	director, script	Feature film	
1999	Macadam tribu (Macadam Tribe)	actor: Papa Sandu	Feature film	
1999	Walaha	director	TV series	
2000	Code inconnu (Code Unknown)	actor: Youssouf	Feature film	
