= Telecommunications in Mali =

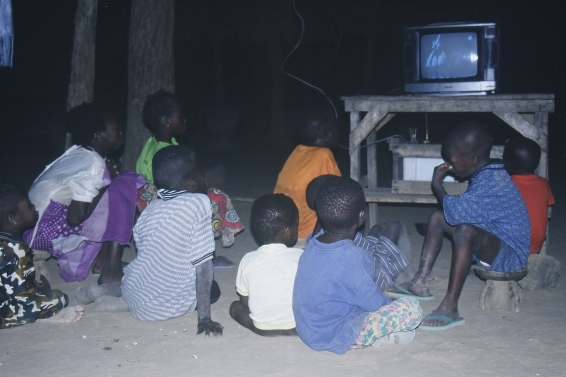
Children watch television in a village in rural Mali.

Mali, a large, landlocked, multicultural country in West Africa, consistently ranks low in the Human Development Index. The infrastructure of communications in Mali, while underdeveloped, is crucial to the nation.

== History ==
Prior to the 19th century, the area which became Mali was crisscrossed by trade and communication links, the most important being the Niger River, and important southern terminals of the Trans-Saharan trade routes. Only the most basic infrastructure (notably the Dakar-Niger Railway) was constructed during the period of French colonialism. During the first two decades of independence, Mali received major technical and financial support from the former Soviet Union, China, and their allies, especially in the area of radio and television broadcasting.

Since the 1980s, the government has instituted major infrastructural drives, primarily funded by European government partners, to improve and expand communications. Cellular phone usage, due to the vast and sparsely populated distances in the north and west, has grown tremendously since the 1990s.

Internet connectivity, very low by developed world standards, has been the focus of decentralised commune based development projects since the year 2000, while the government participates in the UN's Global Alliance for ICT and Development and the Connect Africa projects to further provide computer and internet availability in the country.

== Telephone service ==
There are some 112,000 (2012) fixed line telephone lines in Mali, far outstripped by 14.613 million (2012) mobile cellular phone lines.

There are two major mobile telephone operators, Ikatel (a subsidiary of Sonatel, of Senegal) and Malitel (a subsidiary of SOTELMA, the state owned telecommunications company).

In June 2003, legislation passed a bill allowing other private telecommunications operators to enter the market.

Telephone system: the domestic system is unreliable but improving and provides only minimal service
domestic: network consists of microwave radio relay, open wire, and radiotelephone communications stations; expansion of microwave radio relay in progress
international: satellite earth stations - 2 Intelsat (1 Atlantic Ocean and 1 Indian Ocean)

== Radio and television ==
Radio broadcast stations: Government funded: AM 1, shortwave 1.

Mali has since 1994 allowed for private (as in non-state) radios to begin operating. Foreign funding, and some commercial funding (mostly in the capital) have helped to establish 160 FM stations in Mali, though many of those are small community "suitcase radio stations". Private radio are required to be members of URTEL, the radio union.

The state-operated radio is ORTM (office de Radiodiffusion au Television de Mali), which operates 2 FM stations and 1 television station, with repeaters throughout the country.

note: The shortwave station in Bamako has seven frequencies and five transmitters and relays broadcasts for China Radio International (2001)

Radios: 570,000 (1997)

Television broadcast stations: 1 (plus repeaters) (2001)

Televisions: 45,000 (1997)

== Internet ==
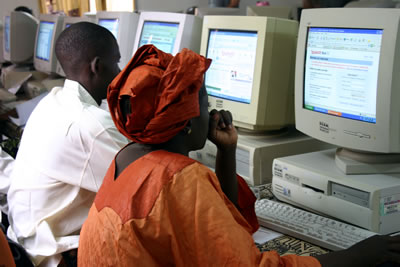
A computer training center in Bamako.

Top-level domain: .ml

Internet users: 414,985 users or 2.9% of the population (2011). Internet usage is low by international standards, ranked 123 of 125 by the UN in 2002.

Internet Service Providers (ISPs): 13 (2001). There are an estimated 25 private internet service providers. Recently an association has been formed called AFIM (Association de Fournisseurs de l'Internet au Mali), which is intended to represent these providers.

SOTELMA the state telecom, provides X.25 and dial-up telephone services. Many operators offer dial-up internet service, and wireless internet services. Most ISPs are small Bamako based providers with a VSAT connection, a cyber cafe and use wireless systems (Alviron, 802.11a, b, g, Motorola) to share their service with their clients. Bamako has at least 21 wireless providers, ranging from small VSAT operators, to sophisticated, multi-access point, full services providers.

== See also ==
- Telephone numbers in Mali
- Office de Radiodiffusion-Télévision du Mali: State Radio and Television broadcaster.
- Union des Radios et Televisions Libres (URTEL)
- Media of Mali
