= Souleymane Cissé (film director) =

Malian film director (1940–2025)

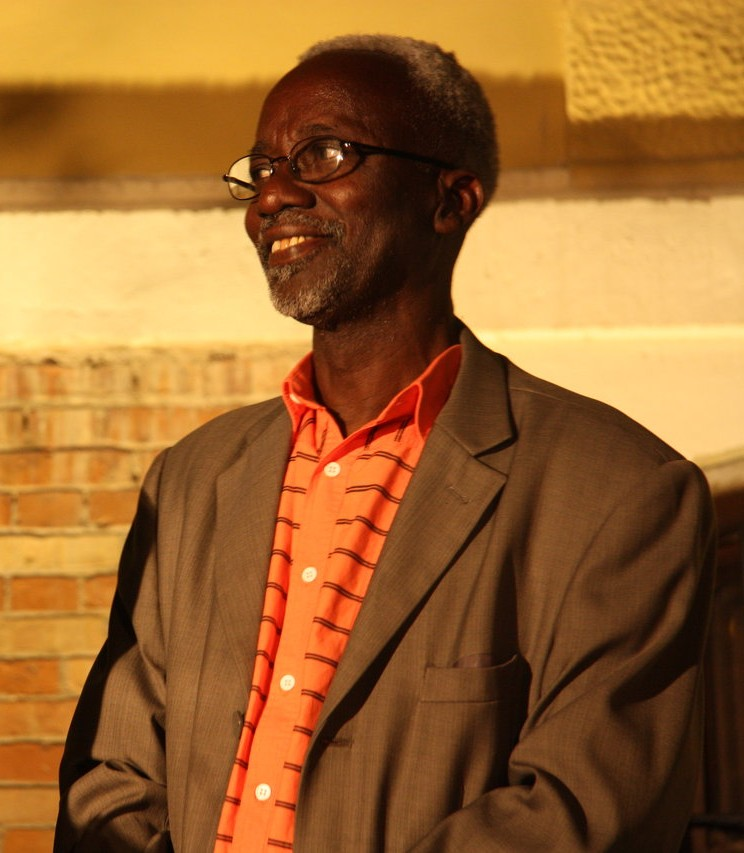
- Souleymane Cissé in 2009
- Born: 21 April 1940; Bamako, French Sudan, French West Africa
- Died: 19 February 2025 (aged 84); Bamako, Mali
- Occupations: Film director, screenwriter

Souleymane Cissé (21 April 1940 – 19 February 2025) was a Malian film director, regarded as one of the first generation of African filmmakers. He was called "Africa's greatest living filmmaker" while his film Yeelen has been called "conceivably the greatest African film ever made".

He was the first director from sub-Saharan Africa to receive an award, at the Cannes Film Festival in 1987, for “Yeelen”, he was awarded the Golden Coach in 2023.

== Life and career ==
Born in Bamako and raised in a Muslim family, Souleymane Cissé was a passionate cinephile from childhood. He attended secondary school in Dakar and returned to Mali in 1960 after national independence.

His film career began as an assistant projectionist for a documentary on the arrest of Patrice Lumumba. This triggered his desire to create films of his own, and he obtained a scholarship at the Gerasimov Institute of Cinematography, the Moscow school of Cinema and Television.

In 1970 he returned to Mali, and joined the Ministry of Information as a cameraman, where he produced documentaries and short films. Two years later, he produced his first medium-length film, Cinq jours d’une vie (Five Days in a Life), which tells the story of a young man who drops out of a Qur'anic school and becomes a petty thief living on the street. Cinq Jours premiered at the Carthage Film Festival.

In 1974, Cissé produced his first full-length film in the Bambara language, Den muso (The Girl), the story of a young mute girl who has been raped. The girl becomes pregnant, and is rejected both by her family and by the child's father. Den muso was banned by the Malian Minister of Culture, and Cissé was arrested and jailed for the dubious charge of accepting French funding. Cissé would never know the real reason for his arrest, but while in jail he wrote the screenplay for his next film Baara (Work). Cissé would finish and release this film to much acclaim four years later, winning the Yenenga's Talon prize at Fespaco in 1979.

In 1982, Cissé produced Finyé (Wind), which tells the story of dissatisfied Malian youth rising up against the establishment. This earned him his second Yenenga's Talon, at 1983's Fespaco.

Between 1984 and 1987, he produced Yeelen (Light or Brightness), a coming-of-age film that won the Jury Prize at the 1987 Cannes Film Festival, becoming the first African film to win a prize in the festival's history. Often cited as his greatest work, Cissé stated in an interview for Cahiers du Cinéma that it was "in part made in opposition to European ethnographic films” and that he “wanted to make a response to an external perception, a perception by white technicians and academics, an alien perception."

In 1995, he produced Waati (Time), which competed for the Palme d'Or at the 1995 Cannes Film Festival.

In 2009, he filmed a comedy that talks about polygamy, inspired by his father, when he, his eight brothers, and his sister should leave their house in 1988. In the film, O Ka (Our House), he reminded the legal battle of his sisters when they were expelled from their house in Bamako.

Cissé was president of UCECAO, the Union of Creators and Entrepreneurs of Cinema and Audiovisual Arts of Western Africa. His younger brother is film director Alioune Ifra Ndiaye.

Cissé was awarded the 'Carrosse d'Or' award at the 2023 Cannes Film Festival, a symbol of the pioneering quality of his films. The award disappeared from his home in Bamako and was reported stolen on 29 April 2024. The loss caused significant public distress in Mali, prompting calls for collective efforts to recover the trophy and reaffirm the nation's cultural pride.

== Death ==
Cissé died at a clinic in Bamako, Mali on 19 February 2025, at the age of 84. Shortly before his death, he was scheduled to chair the "fiction feature film" jury at the 29th edition of Fespaco, on 22 February, in Ouagadougou, Burkina Faso.

== Legacy and style ==
Souleymane Cissé is one of the most recognized African filmmakers of the twentieth century, and his work exemplifies the development of social realism in African cinema, including its eventual movement towards the recovery of tradition.

Cissé has also been called "a master of complex storytelling, preserving the mysterious in the mundane." His films have been known for their uncompromising depictions of military violence, abuse of money and power, trade unionism, and the enduring stranglehold of patriarchal traditions over Bamako's women and youth.

== Filmography ==
- L’aspirant (short film, 1968)
- Source d’inspiration (short film, 1968)
- Dégal à Dialloubé (1970)
- Fête du Sanké (1971)
- Cinq jours d’une vie (1972)
- Den muso (1975)
- L’homme et ses idoles (short film, 1975)
- Baara (1978)
- Chanteurs traditionnels des Iles Seychelles (1978)
- Finye (1982)
- Yeelen (1987)
- Waati (1995)
- Tell Me Who You Are (2009)
- O Sembene! (2013)
- Our House (2015)
