= Macadam Tribu =

- Film poster
- Directed by: José Zeka Laplaine
- Written by: José Zéka Laplaine
- Produced by: Flamingo Films (France) / Bakia Films (RDC) / Animatografo (Portugal)
- Music by: Papa Wemba / Christian POLLONI
- Release date: 1996
- Running time: 90 minutes
- Country: Democratic Republic of the Congo
- Language: French (subtitles)

Macadam Tribu is a 1996 comedy-drama produced by José Zeka Laplaine in the Democratic Republic of the Congo. The film was selected as the Democratic Republic of the Congo's entry for the Best Foreign Language Film at the 70th Academy Awards, but was not accepted as a nominee.

== Plot ==
Two brothers, Mike (recently released from prison) and Kapa roam the streets, bars and boxing halls with Duka, their neighborhood friend. Duka is the result of a not-so-secret fling with Papa Sandu, who owns the neighborhood bar. In the evening, everyone ends up in the bar to discuss the events of the day, the street and the TV. This is also where Bavusi, the mother of Mike and Kapa, comes to remember better times. Other people of the neighborhood who meet at the bar include a policeman and prostitutes. Each has their place. One day, Duka decides to return to the ring to face the great champion Kabeya. The whole neighborhood is there to support him, but the fight goes wrong and Duka falls into a coma.

The characters outwit the authorities, make deals with each other and undertake communal projects that bring them together, notably a theatre project. Afro-pop music provides a background to the film.

== Reception ==
Le Monde said that in this lively but disenchanted street the director José Laplaine brings his characters to life with humor and affection. There is no real story ... La Tribune Desfosses said that "With Macadam Tribu, the Zairian José Laplaine directs a story of a warm African city punctuated by the music of Papa Wemba, the Zairian rumba king. ".

== Festivals ==
The film was shown at a number of festivals:

- Cannes 1996
- Montréal 1996 - Films du Monde
- Locarno 1996
- Toronto 1996
- Los Angeles1996
- Carthage 1996 - Prize for the best first work. Prix du COE
- Amiens 1996 - Compétition
- Nantes 1996 - Section Regards pluriels
- Namur 1996 - CICAE prize
- Rotterdam 1997
- Manosque 1997
- Fribourg 1997 - Panorama
- Fespaco 1997
- Milan 1997
- Amiens 2001
- SALLE : 12.02.1997

== See also ==
- List of submissions to the 70th Academy Awards for Best Foreign Language Film
- List of Democratic Republic of the Congo submissions for the Academy Award for Best Foreign Language Film
