= Tell Me Who You Are (2009 film) =

2009 film

- Directed by: Souleymane Cissé
- Written by: Souleymane Cissé
- Starring: Assane Kouyate; Sogona Gakou; Badra Alou Sissoko
- Release date: May 2009
- Running time: 135 minutes
- Countries: Mali, France

Tell Me Who You Are (also known as Min Ye, French: Dis-moi qui tu es) is a 2009 Malian drama film directed by Souleymane Cissé. It was given a special screening at the 2009 Cannes Film Festival.

== Plot ==
Issa is a filmmaker from a bourgeois family in Bamako, Mali, who is suspicious of his wife Mimi, who he thinks is cheating with someone else.

== Cast ==
- Assane Kouyate as Issa
- Sogona Gakou
- Badra Alou Sissoko
