= The Papalagi =

1920 novel by Erich Scheurmann

The Papalagi (Der Papalagi) is a book by Erich Scheurmann published in Germany in 1920, which contains descriptions of European life, supposedly as seen through the eyes of a Samoan chief named Tuiavii. It is regarded as fictional by some, such as Gunter Senft (see his Weird Papalagi and a fake Samoan chief — A footnote to the Noble Savage Myth).

In 1997 Canadian author Peter Cavelti adapted Scheurmann’s work to the English language audience, translating Chief Tuiavii’s speeches and presenting a comprehensive analysis of the history, culture and linguistic traditions of early 20th century Samoa. Cavelti also researched the controversy surrounding Scheurmann’s work. His work was published by Legacy Editions, Toronto, under the title Tuiavii's Way: A South Sea Chief's Comments on Western Society (1997, 1999, 2007 and 2020). Legacy Editions, Toronto; Crown English Reading/Sanseido Publishing, Tokyo.

A 1975 edition was illustrated by Joost Swarte.

== See also ==
- Nacirema
