= Genesis (1999 film) =

1999 film

- Directed by: Cheick Oumar Sissoko
- Written by: Jean-Louis Sagot-Durvaroux
- Produced by: Jacques Atlan; Chantal Bagilishya
- Starring: Sotigui Kouyaté; Hélène Diarra
- Cinematography: Lionel Cousin
- Edited by: Aïlo Auguste-Judith
- Release date: 16 May 1999
- Running time: 102 minutes
- Countries: Mali; France
- Language: Bambara

Genesis (French: La genèse) is a 1999 French-Malian drama film directed by Cheick Oumar Sissoko. It covers chapters 23 to 37 of the biblical Book of Genesis, with only African actors. It was screened in the Un Certain Regard section at the 1999 Cannes Film Festival.

== Plot ==
There are three stories. First, there is Esau's hatred of his younger brother Jacob for taking his birthright. There is also the abduction and rape of their sister Dina by a Canaanite. The Canaanite falls in love with Dina and offers to make amends. Jacob demands that all the males in his tribe undergo circumcision, which they reluctantly agree to. While they are still recovering from the operation, they are set upon and slain to the last man. Finally, Jacob believes his favorite son, Joseph, to be dead, but later learns that he is alive in Egypt. Jacob and Esau settle their differences, and they all set out for Egypt.

== Cast ==
- Sotigui Kouyaté as Jacob
- Salif Keita as Esau
- Balla Moussa Keita as Hamor
- Fatoumata Diawara as Dina
- Maimouna Hélène Diarra as Lea

== Reception ==
In her Variety review, Deborah Young described the film as "one of the more challenging viewing experiences at Cannes this year ... So dense and poetic is Jean-Louis Sagot-Durvauroux's screenplay and so relentlessly African the idiom that viewers, like Noah, often find themselves adrift in high water." She praised the cinematography, costuming and music.

Stephen Holden of The New York Times called it a "confused allegorical meditation on the region's simmering tribal conflicts". The movie "doesn't really go anywhere, and its most powerful stories are told rather than dramatized." However, he too lauded the cinematography of the "majestically picturesque film".

Kevin Hagopian, Senior Lecturer in Media Studies at Pennsylvania State University, dissented, calling it a "masterwork of the modern diasporic cinema movement".
