= Finzan =

- Directed by: Cheick Oumar Sissoko
- Written by: Cheick Oumar Sissoko
- Cinematography: Mamadou Famakan Coulibaly, Cheick Hamala Keïta, Mohamed Lamine Toure
- Edited by: Ouoba Montandi
- Release date: 1989
- Running time: 107 minutes
- Country: Mali
- Language: Bambara with English subtitles

Finzan / A Dance for Heroes is a 1989 Malian film, the second feature film directed by Cheick Oumar Sissoko. The Malian film critic Manthia Diawara welcomed the film, which deals with arranged marriage and female genital mutilation, as "an impassioned cry for the emancipation of African women [...] one of the boldest examples of socially engaged filmmaking to come out of Africa in recent years".

The film opens with a shot of a mother goat nursing her kids, before cutting to a page of statistics from the World Conference on Women, 1980:

A world profile on the condition of women reveals the striking effects of double oppression. Women are 50 percent of the world's population, do about two-thirds of its work, receive barely 10 percent of its income and own less than 1 percent of its property.

The main character in Finzan is a widow, Nanyuma, expected by tradition to marry her brother-in-law, Bala. To avoid doing do, she escapes to the city, but is eventually captured, tied up, and sent back. Though forced to undergo the marriage ceremony, she refuses to consummate it, and eventually leaves the village to make her own future. In a subplot, a well-educated young women, Fili, questions female genital mutilation. In one of the film's final scenes, she Fili is captured by a group of women and forcibly excised.
