= Office de Radiodiffusion-Télévision du Mali =

National broadcaster in Mali

Office de radiodiffusion et de télévision du Mali (ORTM)
- Type: Broadcast radio and television
- Country: Mali
- Availability: National; International
- Motto: "La Voix du Peuple" (French for 'The Voice of the People')
- Owner: Government of Mali
- Key people: Sidiki Konaté
- Launch date: Radio: 1957; Television: 22 September 1983
- Former names: Radio: Radio Soudan (1957–1960); Radio Nationale du Mali (Radio-Mali) (1960–1983); Radiodiffusion Télévision du Mali (RTM) (1983–1992)
- Official website: www.ortm.ml
- Language: French, Bambara

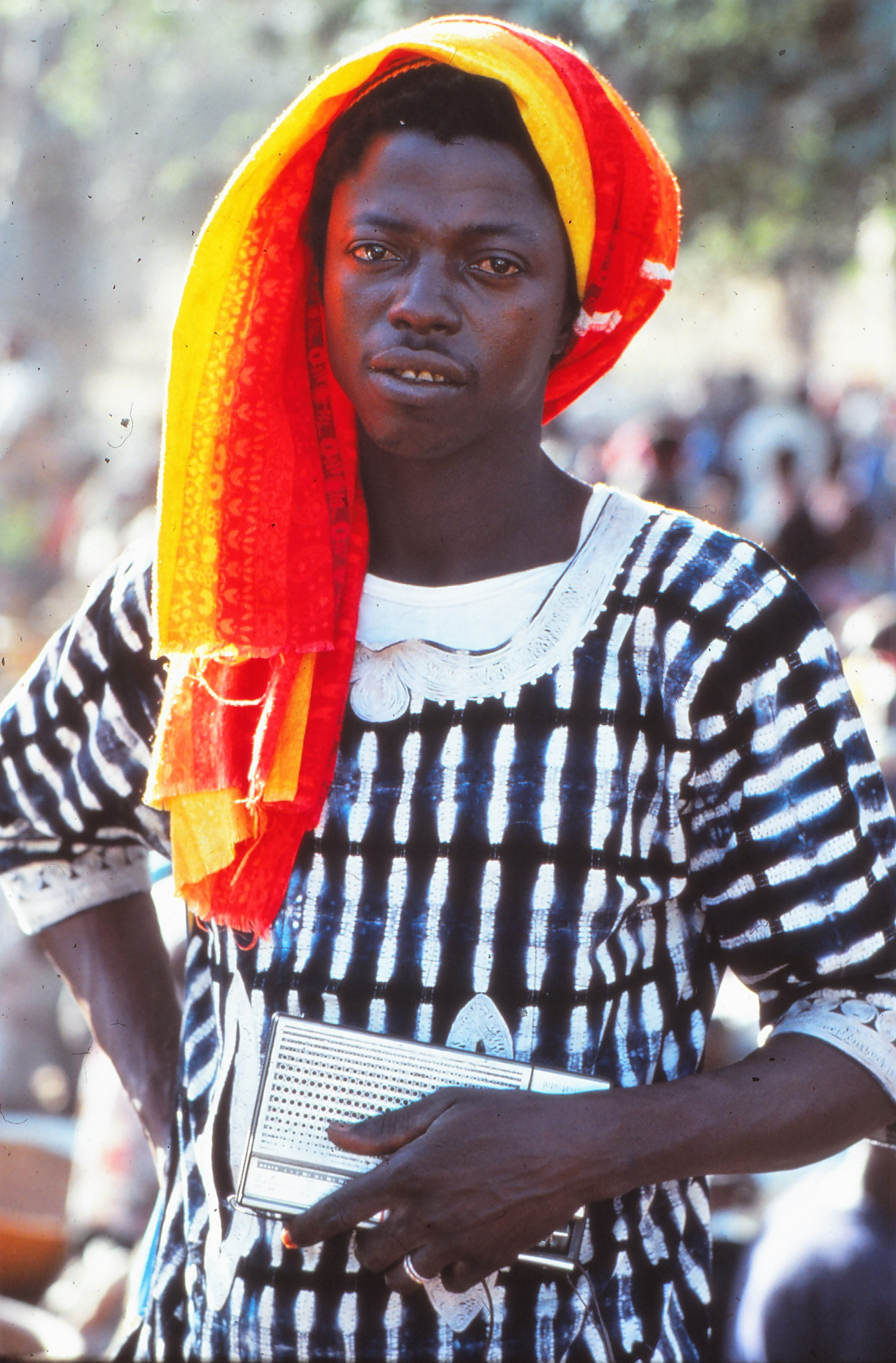
Young Dogon man just returned from Abidjan, with his radio, Tireli, Mali 1985.

The Office of Radio and Television of Mali (French: Office de radiodiffusion et de télévision du Mali, ORTM) is the national broadcaster of the West African state of Mali.

== History ==
Malian broadcasting began in 1957 as a one kilowatt radio station called Radio Soudan in Bamako, then administrative center of the French colony of French Soudan. After independence in 1960, Radio Nationale du Mali (Radio-Mali) began broadcasting from la maison de la Radio in the Bozola neighbourhood of Bamako. Technical abilities were bolstered with Czech transmitters ranging from 18 to 30 kilowatts in 1962.

In 1970, the Chinese government constructed four 50 kW radio transmitters about 7 km from Bamako, towards Kati, enabling Radio Mali to reach much of West Africa. On 22 September 1983, a Libyan financed television broadcast centre was opened in Bamako, enabling RTM to broadcast one channel of colour television. French and German grant programmes between 1984 and 1990 enabled news and reporting to expand, with regional stations opening in Ségou (1986), Koulikoro (1989), Sikasso (1990) and Mopti (1993). In 1992, a second national broadcast radio network (Chiffre II) was added. Colour television was introduced in 1984.

On 5 October 1992, the Malian government split off the RTM. Private broadcasters were legalised, and RTM was reorganised as the ORTM on 1 January 1993.

As of 1996, the sole ORTM channel broadcast for five hours on weekdays and twelve on weekends. Independent newspapers had 5-10 minute segments showing their headlines and using them as a debate segment. Broadcasts started and ended with a collage of Malian footage over the national anthem.

ORTM was seized by National Committee for the Restoration of Democracy and State (CNRDR) forces on 21 March 2012 as part of the 2012 Malian coup d'état. A thousand-person protest was held on 26 March, chanting "Down with Sanogo" and "Liberate the ORTM".

== Current output ==
In 2002, ORTM had 35 local radio and/or television broadcast points or repeaters, with TV/radio broadcast points in all eight Regions of Mali. From its headquarters in Bamako, ORTM produces two radio networks (RTM and Chiffre II), a national television network (RTM), and directs the work of a number of regional RTM radio stations.

Considered one of the freest news markets in Africa, although government office holders threaten (and sometimes resort to) prosecution of broadcasters under Mali's strict anti-libel laws. In 2001, the head of OTRM was threatened with jail after the government attempted to prosecute RTM for an interview in which the mayor of Bamako accused the Malian judiciary of corruption. Since 1992, broadcasting is no longer a state monopoly. There are two large private multi-channel television providers, and numerous private radio stations. Mali is also considered a world leader in community radio development, with ORTM helping to set up the Union des Radios et Televisions Libres (URTEL) , a network of over a hundred independently locally operated stations. OTRM also partners with other government and international organisations in education and development programs throughout Mali.

=== Services ===
==== Radio ====
- ORTM Radio Nationale
- ORTM Chaîne 2
- ORTM Radio Rurale

==== Television ====
- ORTM 1
- ORTM 2

== Programming ==
RTM Radio and television broadcast news and information programming, light entertainment (both foreign and domestic), music and sport. Most national broadcasts are in French with hours of Bambara programming, as well as regional broadcasting in other languages. Emission Hebdomadaire d'Information, the weekly ORTM news magazine, has been broadcasting each Sunday at noon since 1998, and is anchored by Manga Dembélé and Youssouf Touré. A daily news program is broadcast twice daily. Chiffre II radio network is simulcast on the OTRM website, while television broadcasts are carried on regional satellite. ORTM television regularly broadcasts local sport, mostly Maliann Première Division football matches, to an eager audience at least three days a week.

== See also ==
- Communications in Mali
- Television in Mali
