= Union des Radios et Televisions Libres du Mali =

Malian TV and radio regulatory agency

URTEL is an acronym for Union des Radios et Televisions Libres du Mali, the agency responsible for regulating television and radio transmission operations in Mali.

== Operations ==
URTEL is affiliated with the following NGOs, which together form the Comité d’Appui à la Radio pour le Développement, or "CARD".

- ACDI
- Africare
- Fondation Fredrich Ebert
- Helen Keller International
- Institut Panos
- Plan International
- PNUD
- Population Médias Center
- Population Services International
- SNV Netherlands Development Organisation
- UNESCO
- Unicef Mali
- USAID Mali

== See also ==
- Communications in Mali
