= Cheick Oumar Sissoko =

Malian film director and politician

- Born: 1945 (age 80–81); French Sudan
- Education: Ecole des hautes études en sciences sociale, Ecole nationale Louis Lumière
- Occupations: film director and politician

Cheick Oumar Sissoko (born 1945 in San, French Sudan) is a Malian film director and politician.

== Biography ==
As a student in Paris, Cheick Oumar Sissoko obtained a DEA in African History and Sociology and a diploma in History and Cinema from the Ecole des hautes études en sciences sociales. He then continued his studies in cinema at the Ecole nationale Louis Lumière.

On his return to Mali, he took up directing at the Centre National de la Production C inématographique (CNPC), where he directed Sécheresse et Exode rural ("Drought and Rural Exodus").

In 1995, he directed Guimba (The Tyrant), which won special jury prizes at the International Film Festival of Locarno, and l'Etalon de Yennenga (Stallion of Yennenga) at FESPACO (the Panafrican Film and Television Festival of Ouagadougou).

In 1999, La Genèse (Genesis) was released, which won Sissoko another Etalon de Yennenga at FESPACO. In 2000, he directed Battù, based on a novel by Aminata Sow Fall which won him the RFI Prize for Cinema at Fespaco in 2001.

Sissoko founded a production company, Kora Film.

Sissoko and Oumar Mariko founded a political party, African Solidarity for Democracy and Independence (SADI), in 1996. Sissoko is the party's president. He was nominated as the Minister of Culture in the government of Prime Minister Ahmed Mohamed Ag Hamani on 16 October 2002 and remained Minister of Culture in the government of Prime Minister Issoufi Ousmane Maïga, which was named on May 2, 2004. On August 8, 2007, following the death of Minister of National Education Mamadou Lamine Traoré in July, Sissoko was named Minister of National Education, while remaining Minister of Culture. He was not included in the government named on October 3, 2007.

Another film that Sissoko created was called The Garbage Boys. This film tells a bittersweet story about children growing up in Bamako, Mali; it showed them fighting obstacles on a daily basis. The children portrayed in the film were shown having to carry their own desks to school, picking up garbage to make money, play in the streets, learn vices, as well as watch their mothers die in childbirth. The film seemed to have different effects on different populations. Author Manthia Diwara notes in their book that when observing different populations reaction to the film, the wealthier populations that saw the film felt badly for the characters and cried while the poorer populations of Mali laughed because they felt that it was true and that everyone should have to experience it.

The themes in The Garbage Boys are in accordance with Sissoko's personal views in terms of promoting diversity and understanding. In an interview at the Festival au Desert as the Minister of Culture he stated:

I believe my most important task is safeguarding the cohesion between the various ethnic groups in Mali. One of the available instruments is subsidising festivals like this one... The differences date from many centuries ago. We must welcome those differences and show respect for one another. We do that rather well because the people of Mali are extremely hospitable and socially oriented. The festivals have an important meeting function, and work very well.

In 1999, Sissoko was honoured with a Prince Claus Award from the Prince Claus Fund, an international culture and development organisation based in Amsterdam.

== Filmography ==
- L'Ecole malienne (1982)
- Les Audiothèques rurales (1983)
- Sécheresse et exode rural (1984)
- Nyamanton, la leçon des ordures (1986)
- Finzan (1990)
- Etre jeune à Bamako (1992)
- L'Afrique bouge (1992)
- Problématique de la malnutrition (1993)
- Guimba, un tyrant, une époque (English: Guimba the Tyrant) (1995)
- La Genèse (1999)
- Battù (2000)
