= Zeka Laplaine =

Congolese director and actor

Zeka Leplaine
- Born: 1960 (age 65–66)
- Occupations: Actor, director
- Notable work: Macadam Tribu

Zeka Laplaine (born 1960), sometimes credited as José Laplaine, is a director and actor from Ilebo in the Democratic Republic of the Congo. The child of a Portuguese father and Congolese mother, he moved to Europe when he was 18. His 1996 short film Le Clandestin was featured at the 2010 Amakula International Film Festival in Uganda. He portrayed a cowboy alongside Danny Glover in Death in Timbuktu, a film within a film in the Council of Europe Film Award-winning film, Bamako. Laplaine is a member of France's "Guilde Africaine des Realisateurs et Producteurs".

Laplaine's first short film was Le Clandestin, which he wrote, directed and acted in (playing a policeman in charge of a container dock in Lisbon). A French production set in Portugal, Le Clandestin examines African emigration and questions the dream of Europe as a "Northern Paradise" for immigrants.

== Filmography ==
Year	Film	Plot
1996	Le Clandestin	A young African man jumps out of a container at Lisbon harbour. Attempting to meet his cousin in town, he is pursued by a policeman. He never meets cousin, and eventually decides to return to Africa.
1996	Macadam Tribu	Set in Kinshasa, the film shows "unauthorised communities" forming within the official city, and the struggle of characters to survive. A community project—a theatrical production about popular rebellion—provides the backdrop to the fall of President Mobutu Sese Seko.
2001	Paris: XY	
2003	Le Jardin de Papa	A French couple honeymoon in Dakar.
2006	Kinshasa Palace	
2007	Le Lac Sacré	

=== Actor ===
Year	Film	Role
1996	Le Clandestin	A policeman.
1996	Terra Estrangeira	Loli
2001	Paris: XY	Max.
2006	Bamako by Abderrahmane Sissako	A cowboy.
2007	Teranga Blues by Moussa Sene Absa	Zéka.
