= Outline of Mali =

Overview of and topical guide to Mali

The Flag of Mali

The Coat of arms of Mali

The location of Mali

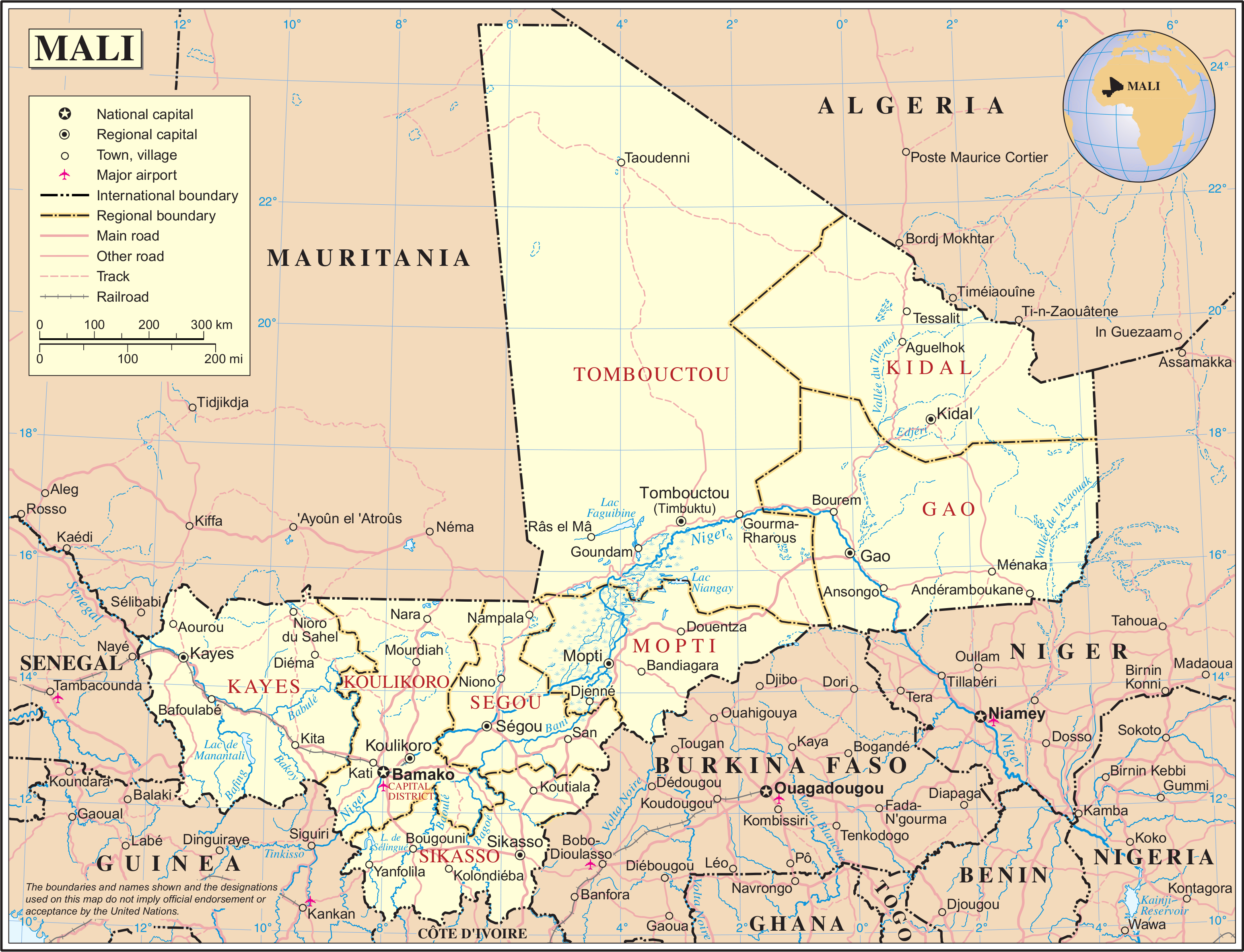
An enlargeable map of Mali

The following outline is provided as an overview of and topical guide to Mali:

Mali – landlocked sovereign country located in West Africa. It is the seventh most extensive country in Africa, bordering Algeria on the north, Niger on the east, Burkina Faso and the Côte d'Ivoire on the south, Guinea on the south-west, and Senegal and Mauritania on the west.

Consisting of eight regions, Mali's borders on the north reach deep into the middle of the Sahara, while the country's southern region, where the majority of inhabitants live, features the Niger River and Senegal River. The country's economic structure centers around agriculture and fishing. Some of Mali's natural resources include gold, uranium, and salt. Due to a high incidence of poverty, Mali is considered to be one of the poorest nations in the world.

Present-day Mali was once part of three West African empires that controlled trans-Saharan trade: the Ghana Empire, the Mali Empire (from which Mali is named), and the Songhai Empire. In the late 19th century, Mali fell under French control, becoming part of French Sudan. Mali gained independence in 1959 with Senegal, as the Mali Federation in 1959. A year later, the Mali Federation became the independent nation of Mali in 1960. After a long period of one-party rule, a 1991 coup led to the writing of a new constitution and the establishment of Mali as a democratic, multi-party state.

== General reference ==
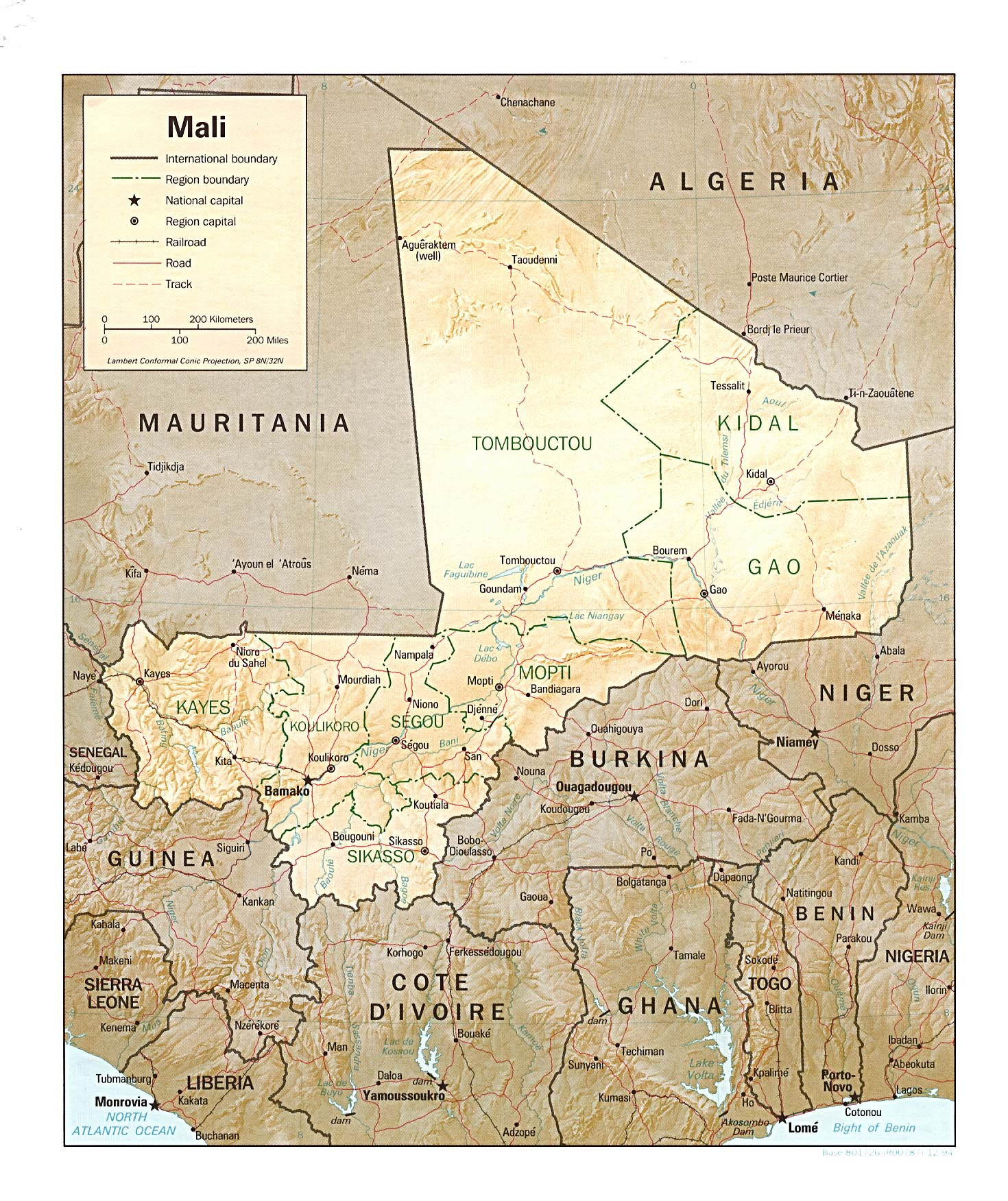
An enlargeable relief map of Mali

- Pronunciation: /ˈmɑːli/
- Common English country name: Mali
- Official English country name: The Republic of Mali
- Common endonym(s):
- Official endonym(s):
- Adjectival(s): Malian
- Demonym(s): Malian(s)
- Etymology: Name of Mali
- ISO country codes: ML, MLI, 466
- ISO region codes: See ISO 3166-2:ML
- Internet country code top-level domain: .ml

== Geography of Mali ==
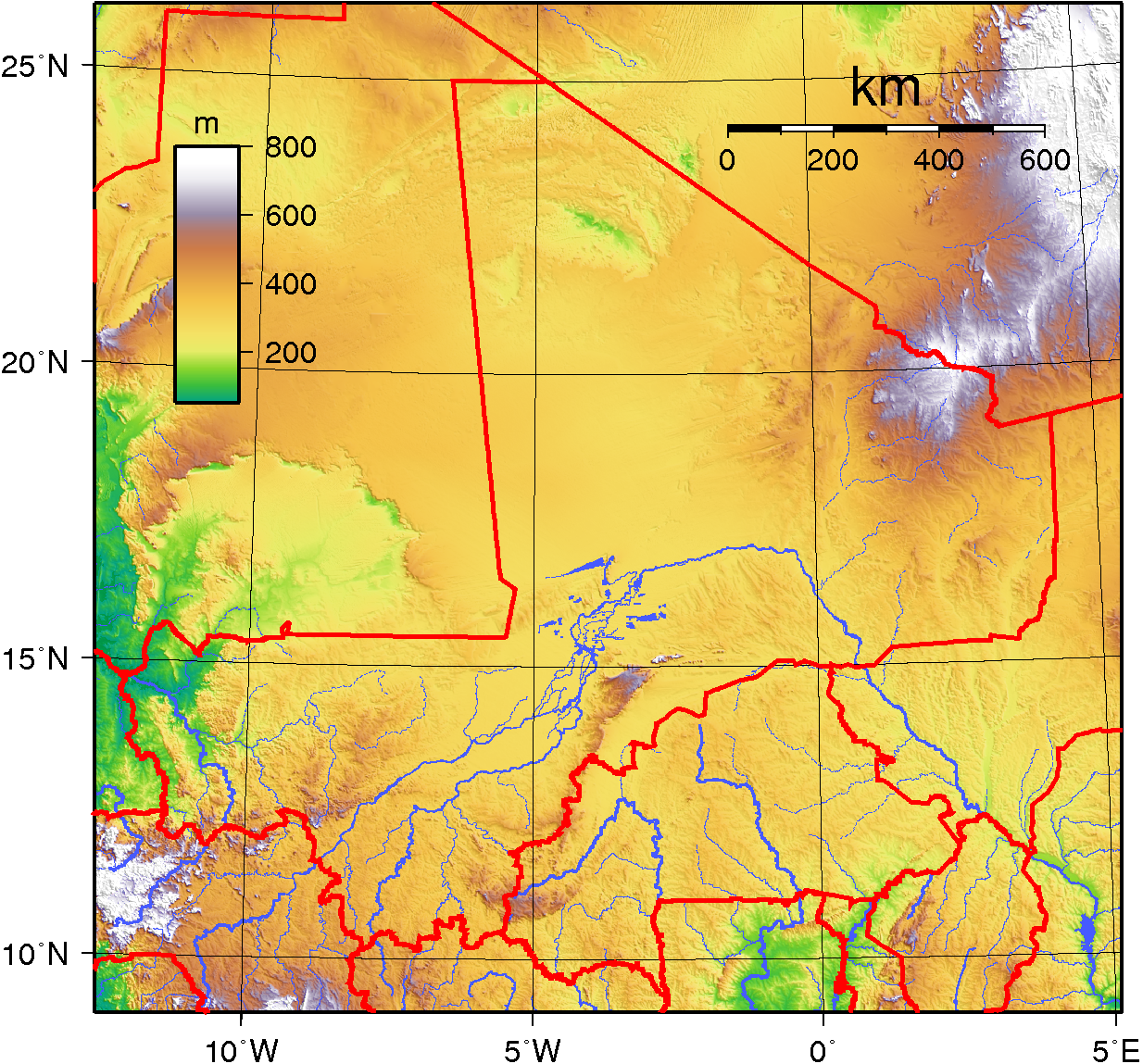
An enlargeable topographic map of Mali

Geography of Mali

- Mali is: a landlocked country
- Population of Mali: 12,337,000 - 59th most populous country
- Area of Mali: 1,240,192 km^{2}
- Atlas of Mali

=== Location ===
- Mali is situated within the following regions:
  - Northern Hemisphere and lies on the Prime Meridian
    - Africa
      - North Africa
      - West Africa
      - partially within the Sahara Desert
- Time zone: Coordinated Universal Time UTC+00
- Extreme points of Mali
  - High: Hombori Tondo 1,155 m (3,789 ft)
  - Low: Senegal River 23 m (75 ft)
- Land boundaries: 7,243 km

Mauritania 2,237 km
Algeria 1,376 km
Burkina Faso 1,000 km
Guinea 858 km
Niger 821 km
Cote d'Ivoire 532 km
Senegal 419 km

- Coastline: none

=== Environment of Mali ===
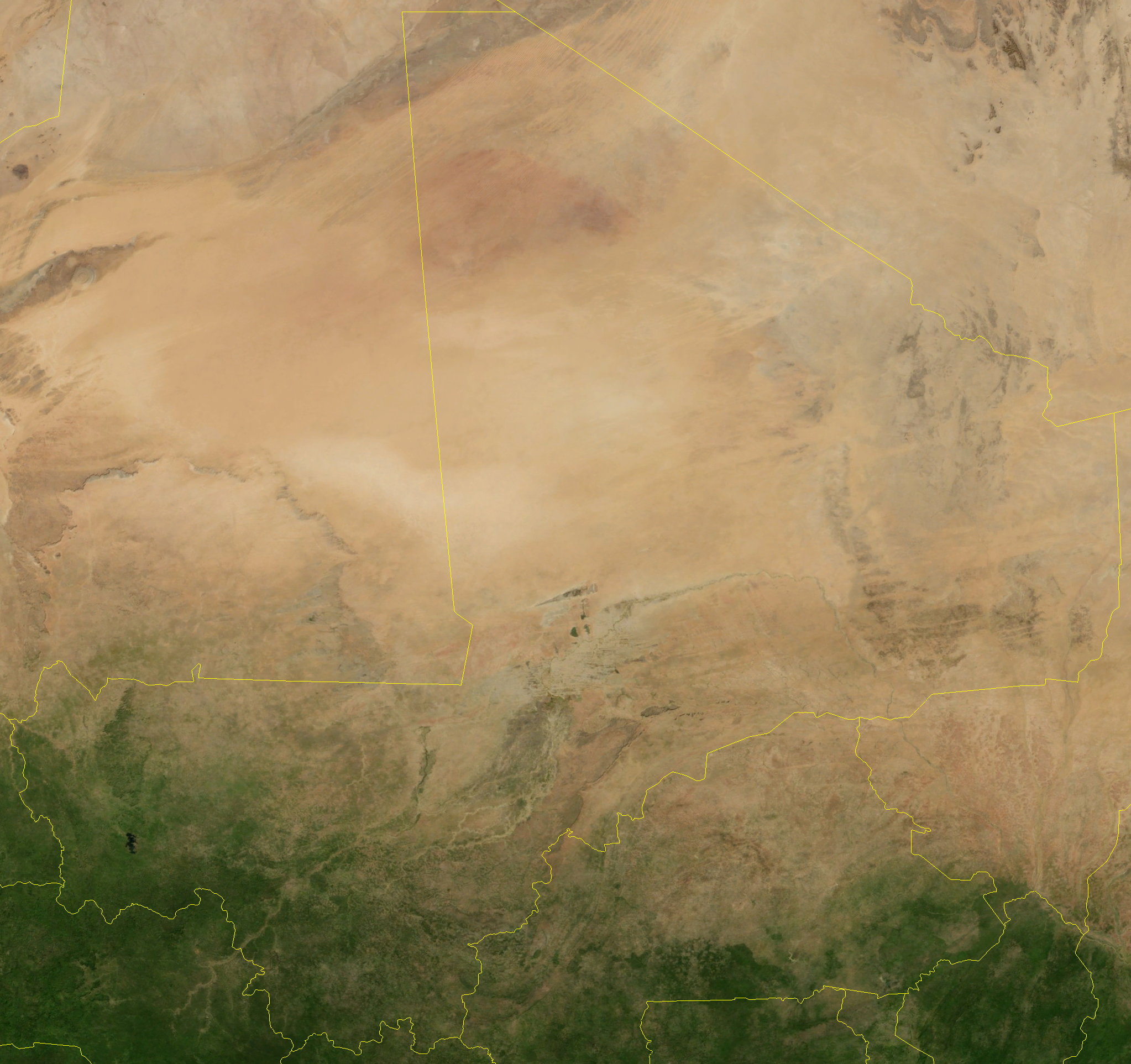
An enlargeable satellite image of Mali

Environment of Mali

- Climate of Mali
- Environmental issues in Mali
- Wildlife of Mali
  - Fauna of Mali
    - Birds of Mali
    - Mammals of Mali

==== Natural geographic features of Mali ====
- Glaciers in Mali: none
- Rivers of Mali
- World Heritage Sites in Mali

=== Regions of Mali ===
==== Ecoregions of Mali ====
List of ecoregions in Mali

==== Administrative divisions of Mali ====
Administrative divisions of Mali

- Regions of Mali
  - Cercles of Mali
    - Arrondissements of Mali
      - Communes of Mali

===== Regions of Mali =====
Regions of Mali

===== Cercles of Mali =====
Cercles of Mali

===== Arrondissements of Mali =====
Arrondissements of Mali

===== Communes of Mali =====
Communes of Mali

===== Municipalities of Mali =====
- Capital of Mali: Bamako
- Cities of Mali

=== Demography of Mali ===
Demographics of Mali

== Government and politics of Mali ==
Politics of Mali

- Form of government: presidential representative democratic republic
- Capital of Mali: Bamako
- Elections in Mali
- Political parties in Mali

=== Branches of the government of Mali ===
Government of Mali

==== Executive branch of the government of Mali ====
- Head of state: President of Mali, Assimi Goïta
- Head of government: Prime Minister of Mali, Abdoulaye Maïga
- Cabinet of Mali

==== Legislative branch of the government of Mali ====
- Parliament of Mali (bicameral)
  - Upper house: Senate of Mali
  - Lower house: House of Commons of Mali

==== Judicial branch of the government of Mali ====
Court system of Mali

=== Foreign relations of Mali ===
Foreign relations of Mali

- Diplomatic missions in Mali
- Diplomatic missions of Mali

==== International organization membership ====
The Republic of Mali is a member of:

- Alliance of Sahel States (AES)
- African, Caribbean, and Pacific Group of States (ACP)
- African Development Bank Group (AfDB)
- African Union (AU) (Suspended)
- African Union/United Nations Hybrid operation in Darfur (UNAMID)
- Conference des Ministres des Finances des Pays de la Zone Franc (FZ)
- Economic Community of West African States (ECOWAS) (Suspended)
- Food and Agriculture Organization (FAO)
- Group of 77 (G77)
- International Atomic Energy Agency (IAEA)
- International Bank for Reconstruction and Development (IBRD)
- International Civil Aviation Organization (ICAO)
- International Criminal Court (ICCt)
- International Criminal Police Organization (Interpol)
- International Development Association (IDA)
- International Federation of Red Cross and Red Crescent Societies (IFRCS)
- International Finance Corporation (IFC)
- International Fund for Agricultural Development (IFAD)
- International Labour Organization (ILO)
- International Monetary Fund (IMF)
- International Olympic Committee (IOC)
- International Organization for Migration (IOM)
- International Red Cross and Red Crescent Movement (ICRM)
- International Telecommunication Union (ITU)
- International Telecommunications Satellite Organization (ITSO)
- International Trade Union Confederation (ITUC)
- Inter-Parliamentary Union (IPU)
- Islamic Development Bank (IDB)
- Multilateral Investment Guarantee Agency (MIGA)
- Nonaligned Movement (NAM)
- Organisation internationale de la Francophonie (OIF)
- Organisation of Islamic Cooperation (OIC)
- Organisation for the Prohibition of Chemical Weapons (OPCW)
- United Nations (UN)
- United Nations Conference on Trade and Development (UNCTAD)
- United Nations Educational, Scientific, and Cultural Organization (UNESCO)
- United Nations Industrial Development Organization (UNIDO)
- United Nations Mission in Liberia (UNMIL)
- United Nations Mission in the Central African Republic and Chad (MINURCAT)
- United Nations Mission in the Sudan (UNMIS)
- United Nations Organization Mission in the Democratic Republic of the Congo (MONUC)
- Universal Postal Union (UPU)
- West African Development Bank (WADB) (regional)
- West African Economic and Monetary Union (WAEMU)
- World Customs Organization (WCO)
- World Federation of Trade Unions (WFTU)
- World Health Organization (WHO)
- World Intellectual Property Organization (WIPO)
- World Meteorological Organization (WMO)
- World Tourism Organization (UNWTO)
- World Trade Organization (WTO)

=== Law and order in Mali ===
Law of Mali

- Constitution of Mali
- Human rights in Mali
  - LGBT rights in Mali
- Law enforcement in Mali

=== Military of Mali ===
Military of Mali

- Command
  - Commander-in-chief:
- Forces
  - Army of Mali
  - Navy of Mali: None
  - Air Force of Mali

=== Local government in Mali ===
Local government in Mali

== History of Mali ==
History of Mali

== Culture of Mali ==
Culture of Mali

- Architecture of Mali
- Cuisine of Mali
- Languages of Mali
- Media in Mali
- National symbols of Mali
  - Coat of arms of Mali
  - Flag of Mali
  - National anthem of Mali
- Public holidays in Mali
- Religion in Mali
  - Hinduism in Mali
  - Islam in Mali
- World Heritage Sites in Mali

=== Art in Mali ===
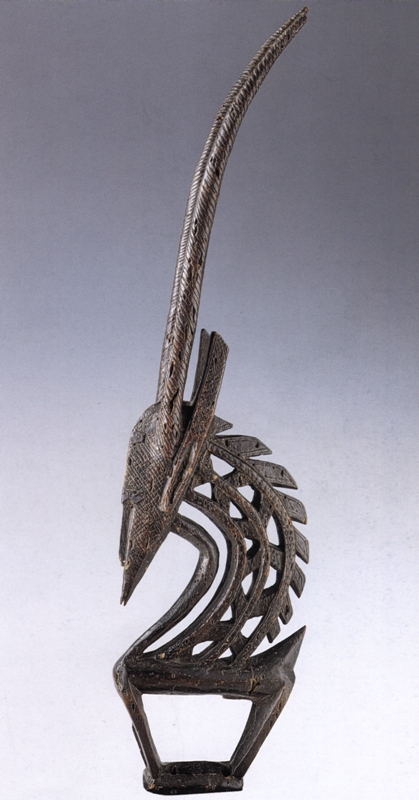
The antelope figure, Mali, from the collection of Raccolte Extraeuropee, Milan.

- Art in Mali
- Cinema of Mali
- Music of Mali
- Television in Mali

=== Sports in Mali ===
Sports in Mali

- Football in Mali
- Mali at the Olympics

== Economy and infrastructure of Mali ==
Economy of Mali

- Economic rank, by nominal GDP (2007): 131st (one hundred and thirty first)
- Agriculture in Mali
- Communications in Mali
  - Internet in Mali
- Companies of Mali
- Currency of Mali: Franc
  - ISO 4217: XOF
- Health care in Mali
- Mining in Mali
- Stock Exchange in Mali: none – served by the regional stock exchange Bourse Régionale des Valeurs Mobilières (BRVM) in Abidjan, Côte d'Ivoire.
- Tourism in Mali
- Transport in Mali
  - Airports in Mali
  - Rail transport in Mali

== Education in Mali ==
Education in Mali

== Health in Mali ==
Health in Mali

== See also ==
Mali

- List of international rankings
- List of Mali-related topics
- Member state of the United Nations
- Outline of Africa
- Outline of geography
