= List of companies of Mali =

Location of Mali

Mali is a landlocked country in West Africa. The country's economy centers on agriculture and fishing. Some of Mali's prominent natural resources include gold, being the third largest producer of gold in the African continent, and salt. About half the population lives below the international poverty line of $1.25 (U.S.) a day.

== Notable firms ==
This list includes notable companies with primary headquarters located in the country. The industry and sector follow the Industry Classification Benchmark framework. Organizations which have ceased operations are included and noted as defunct.

Notable companies Status: P=Private, S=State; A=Active, D=Defunct
Name	Industry	Sector	Headquarters	Founded	Notes	Status	
Africable	Consumer services	Broadcasting & entertainment	Bamako	2004	Television channel	P	A
Air Mali	Consumer services	Airlines	Bamako	2005	Formerly Compagnie Aérienne du Mali	P	A
Banque de l'Habitat du Mali (BHM)	Financials	Banks	Bamako	1996	Bank	P	A
Compagnie malienne pour le développement du textile (CMDT)	Consumer goods	Farming & fishing	Bamako	1974	Cotton company	P	A
Ikatel	Telecommunications	Mobile telecommunications	Bamako	2003	Mobile network, defunct 2006	P	D
Mali Air Express	Consumer services	Airlines	Bamako	2005	Airline	P	A
Mali Air Transport	Industrials	Delivery services	Bamako	2008	Charter airline, defunct 2009	P	D
Mali Airways	Consumer services	Airlines	Bamako	?	Airline	P	A
Malian Solidarity Bank	Financials	Banks	Bamako	2002	Bank	P	A
Malitel	Telecommunications	Mobile telecommunications	Bamako	1989	Subsidiary of Sotelma	P	A
Office de Radiodiffusion-Télévision du Mali	Consumer services	Broadcasting & entertainment	Bamako	1957	Radio and television	S	A
Office national des postes du Mali	Industrials	Delivery services	Bamako	1989	Postal services	S	A
SAM Intercontinental	Consumer services	Airlines	Bamako	2008	Charter airline	P	A
Société Nationale Air Mali	Consumer services	Airlines	Bamako	1961	Defunct 1988	P	D
Sotelma	Telecommunications	Mobile telecommunications	Bamako	1989	Former state-owned firm	P	A

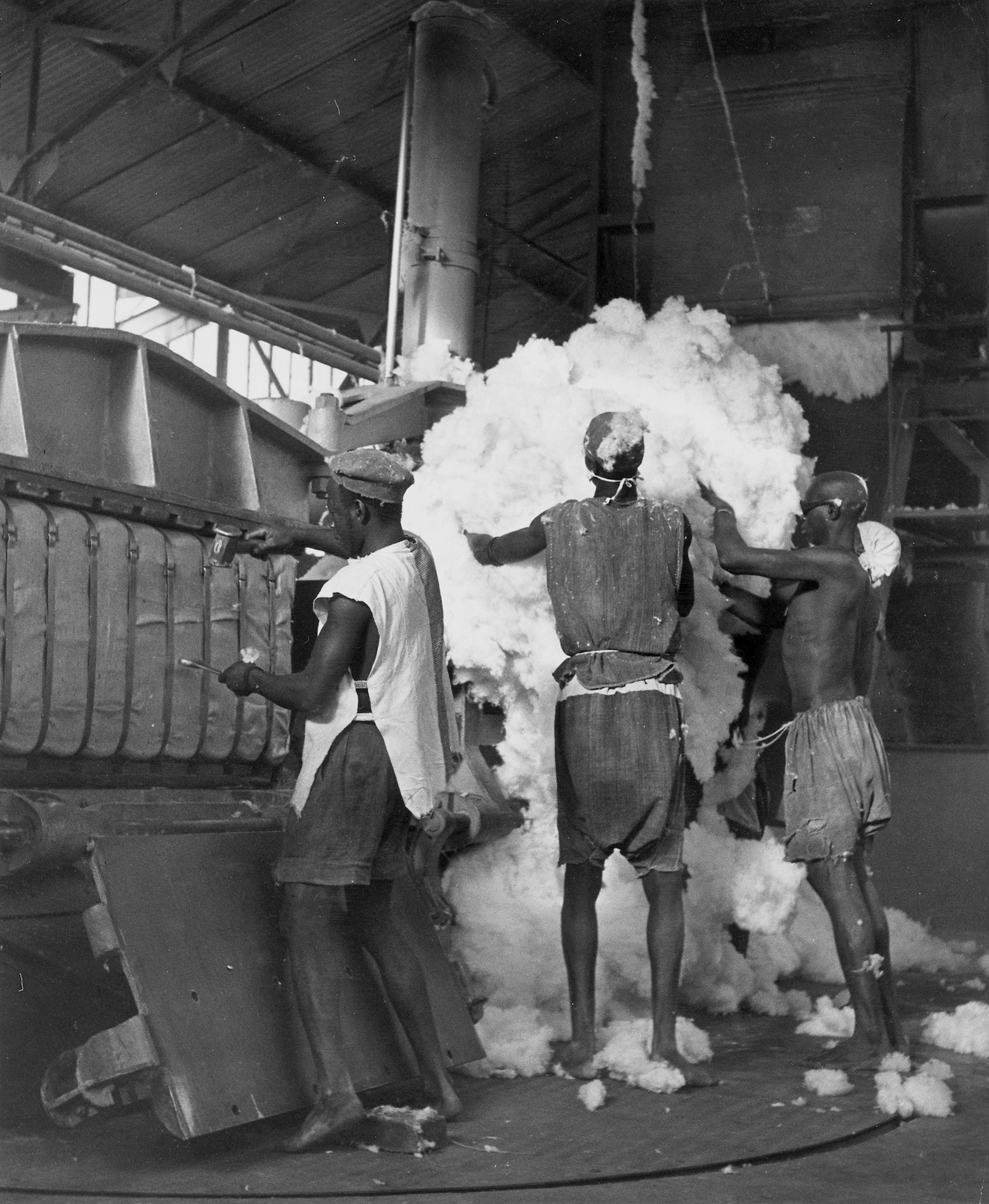
Cotton being processed in Niono, c. 1950.

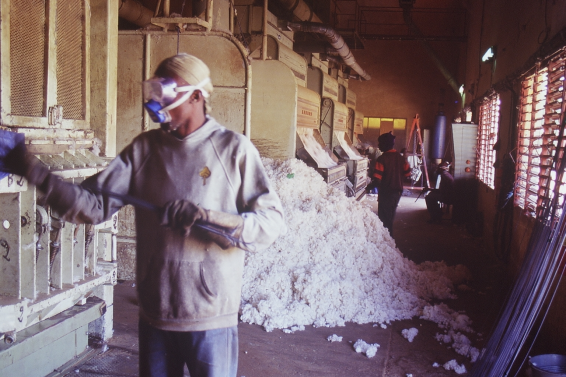
Modern cotton processing at CMDT

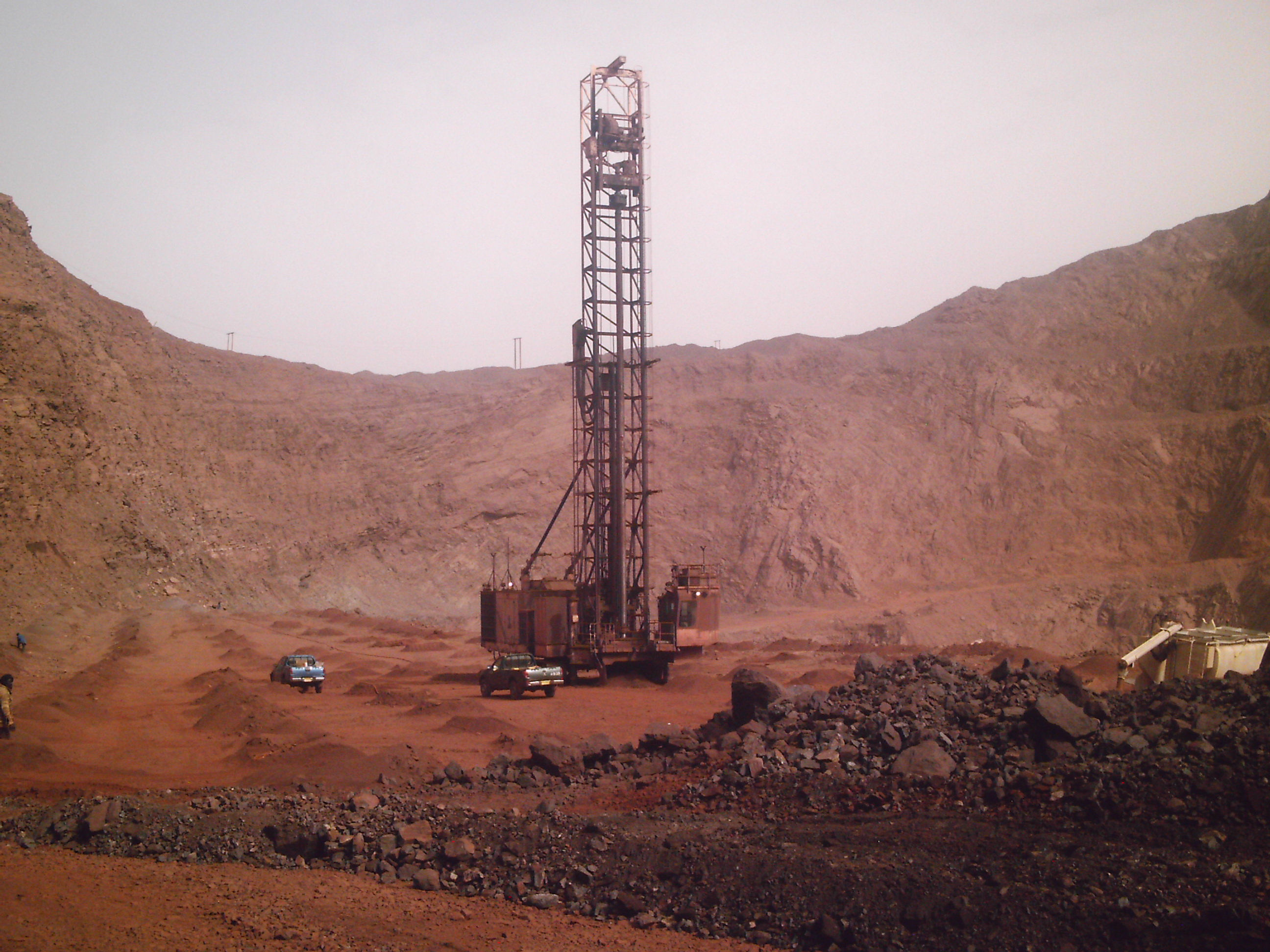
Drilling for oil in the Taoudeni basin.

== See also ==
- Economy of Mali
