= List of airline codes (M) =

This is a list of all airline codes. The table lists the IATA airline designators, the ICAO airline designators and the airline call signs (telephony designator). Historical assignments are also included for completeness.

== Codes ==
Airline codes
IATA	ICAO	Airline	Call sign	Country	Comments
Q2	DQA	Maldivian	ISLAND AVIATION	Maldives	
	MMH	McMahon Helicopter	NIGHT RIDER	United States	2015
	HOG	Mahogany Air Charters	HOGAN AIR	Zambia	2014
	MTS	Med Jets	MED SERVICE	Mexico	2014
	MSF	Minsheng International Jet	MEINSHENG	China	2014
	MXS	Millon Express	MILLON EXPRESS	United States	Trading name for Sunrise Airlines allocated in 2014
	MHF	Maritime Helicopters	AIR MARITIME	United States	Allocated 2014
BF	MRK	MarkAir	MARKAIR	United States	1984-1995
WD	MWM	Modern Transporte Aereo De Carga	MODERNAIR	Brazil	
	MSJ	Magnum Air	MAGNUM AIR	Philippines	
	MWI	Malawian Airlines 2014	MALAWIAN	Malawi	
	MYP	Mann Yadanarpon Airlines	MANN ROYAL	Myanmar	
NR	MAV	Manta Air	SEA WING	Maldives	
	RDK	Memorial Hermann Hospital System	RED DUKE	United States	Houston, Texas
	MLV	Multiservicios Aereos Del Valle	MULTI VALLE	Mexico	
	MMJ	Macau Jet International	MACAUJET	China	
	MXF	Maximum Flight Advantages	MAXFLIGHT	United States	
OD	MXD	Malindo Airways	MALINDO EXPRESS	Malaysia	
	MJC	Mandarin Air	AIR MANDA	China	
	PLG	MBK-S	PILGRIM	Russia	
	DZR	Midwest Aviation	DOZER	United States	
	MSN	Milenium Air Servicios Aereos Integrados		Mexico	
	MFB	Mountain Flyers 80	MOUNTAINHELI	Switzerland	
	HTL	My Fair Jet	HOTLINE	Austria	
	JNH	M & N Aviation	JONAH	United States	
	MCF	MAC Fotografica	MAC FOTO	Spain	
	MRG	MANAG'AIR	MANAG'AIR	France	
AQ	MPJ	MAP-Management and Planung	MAPJET	Austria	
	TFG	MAS Airways	TRAFALGAR	United Kingdom	
M7	MAA	MasAir	MAS CARGA	Mexico	
MH	MWG	MASwings	MASWINGS	Malaysia	transitioned to AirBorneo on 1 January 2026
IN	MAK	MAT Macedonian Airlines	MAKAVIO	Macedonia	Defunct
	MCC	MCC Aviation	DISCOVERY	South Africa	
	MGA	MG Aviación	MAG AVACION	Spain	
	JLA	MIA Airlines	SALLINE	Romania	
OM	MGL	MIAT Mongolian Airlines	MONGOL AIR	Mongolia	
	MNC	MIT Airlines	MUNCIE	Canada	
	MKA	MK Airline	KRUGER-AIR	Ghana	
MB	MNB	MNG Airlines	BLACK SEA	Turkey	
	EBF	MSR Flug-Charter	SKYRUNNER	Germany	
	MCV	MTC Aviación	MTC AVIACION	Mexico	
	MAQ	Mac Aviation	MAC AVIATION	Spain	
	MCN	Mac Dan Aviation Corporation	MAC DAN	United States	
	MTD	MacKnight Airlines		Australia	
CC	MCK	Macair Airlines		Australia	
	MCS	Macedonian Airlines	MACAIR	Greece	
	MDH	Madina Air	MADINA AIR	Libya	
DM	DAN	Maersk Air	MAERSKAIR	Denmark	Defunct
VB	MSK	Maersk Air UK	BLUESTAR	United Kingdom	Defunct, later became Duo Airways
	MJB	Magic Blue Airlines	MAGIC BLUE	Netherlands	
	MGR	Magna Air	MAGNA AIR	Austria	
	MLH	Mahalo Air	MAHALO	United States	
W5	IRM	Mahan Air	MAHAN AIR	Iran	
M2	MZS	Mahfooz Aviation	MAHFOOZ	Gambia	
	MAT	Maine Aviation	MAINE-AV	United States	
	MAJ	Majestic Airlines	MAGIC AIR	United States	
	AKM	Mak Air	MAKAIR	Kazakhstan	
	MLG	Malagasy Airlines		Madagascar	
	MLX	Malawi Express	MALAWI EXPRESS	Malawi	
	MKK	Malaya Aviatsia Dona	AEROKEY	Russia	
MH	MAS	Malaysia Airlines	MALAYSIAN	Malaysia	
DB	MLT	Maleth-Aero		Malta	
	MAE	Mali Air	MALI AIREXPRESS	Austria	
	VXP	Mali Air Express	AVION EXPRESS	Mali	
	MTZ	Mali Airways	MALI AIRWAYS	Mali	
	MLC	Malila Airlift	MALILA	Democratic Republic of the Congo	
	MLS	Mall Airways	MALL-AIRWAYS	United States	
	LOD	Malmoe Air Taxi	LOGIC	Sweden	
TF	SCW	Malmö Aviation	SCANWING	Sweden	
	MAY	Malta Air		Malta	2019
R5	MAC	Malta Air Charter	MALTA CHARTER	Malta	Defunct?
	MWS	Malta Wings	MALTA WINGS	Malta	
MA	MAH	Malév Hungarian Airlines	MALEV	Hungary	defunct
	MLB	Manaf International Airways	MANAF	Burundi	
RI	MDL	Mandala Airlines	MANDALA	Indonesia	
AE	MDA	Mandarin Airlines	MANDARIN	Taiwan	
JE	MNO	Mango	TULCA	South Africa	
	MHN	Manhattan Air	MANHATTAN	United Kingdom	
	MTO	Marathon Airlines	MARATHON	Greece	
	MNR	Mann Air	TEEMOL	United Kingdom	
	MAN	Mannion Air Charter	MANNION	United States	
	MTS	Mantrust Asahi Airways	MANTRUST	Indonesia	
	MNX	Manx Airlines	MANX	United Kingdom	
	MAD	Maple Air Services	MAPLE AIR	Canada	
	MAR	March Helicopters	MARCH	United Kingdom	
	MCP	Marcopolo Airways	MARCOPOLO	Afghanistan	
	MGI	Marghi Air	MARGHI	Nigeria	
	MRK	Markair	MARKAIR	United States	
	MKO	Markoss Aviation	GOSHAWK	United Kingdom	
6V	MRW	Mars RK	AVIAMARS	Ukraine	
	MCE	Marshall Aerospace	MARSHALL	United Kingdom	
M7	MSL	Marsland Aviation	MARSLANDAIR	Sudan	
	XMA	Martin Aviation Services		United States	
	MBE	Martin-Baker	MARTIN	United Kingdom	
MP	MPH	Martinair	MARTINAIR	Netherlands	
	MRA	Martinaire	MARTEX	United States	
	MFA	Martyn Fiddler Associates	SEAHORSE	United Kingdom	
	MVN	Marvin Limited	MARVIN	United Kingdom	
	TRP	Maryland State Police	TROOPER	United States	
	MTH	Massachusetts Institute of Technology	RESEARCH	United States	
	MSY	Massey University School of Aviation	MASSEY	New Zealand	
	MSW	Master Airways	MASTER AIRWAYS	Serbia	
	MPL	Master Planner		United States	
	LMJ	Masterjet	MASTERJET	Portugal	
Q4		Mastertop Linhas Aéreas		Brazil	
	MIA	Mauria	MAURIA	Mauritania	
	MNV	Mauritanienne Aerienne Et Navale	NAVALE	Mauritania	
	MRF	Mauritanienne Air Fret	MAUR-FRET	Mauritania	
	MWY	Mauritanienne Airways	MAURITANIENNE	Mauritania	
	MDE	Mauritanienne De Transport Aerien	MAURI-TRANS	Mauritania	
	MVR	Maverick Airways	MAV-AIR	United States	
H5	MVL	Mavial Magadan Airlines	Mavial	Russia	
	MAI	Max Avia	MAX AVIA	Kyrgyzstan	
	MSF	Max Sea Food	MAXESA	El Salvador	
	MAX	Max-Aviation	MAX AVIATION	Canada	
8M	MXL	Maxair	MAXAIR	Sweden	
	MXU	Maximus Air Cargo	CARGO MAX	United Arab Emirates	
MY	MXJ	Maxjet Airways	MAX-JET	United States	Defunct
	MXS	Maxsus-Avia	MAXSUS-AVIA	Uzbekistan	
	MXP	May Air Xpress	BEECHNUT	United States	
MW	MYD	Maya Island Air	MYLAND	Belize	
7M	MYI	Mayair	MAYAIR	Mexico	
	MBS	Mbach Air	MBACHI AIR	Malawi	Ground Services
	MCH	McAlpine Helicopters	MACLINE	United Kingdom	
	MKL	McCall Aviation	MCCALL	United States	
	DAC	McDonnell Douglas	DACO	United States	
	MDS	McNeely Charter Services	MID-SOUTH	United States	
	MEK	Med-Trans of Florida	MED-TRANS	United States	
	MDM	Medavia	MEDAVIA	Malta	
	MRZ	Medical Air Rescue Services	MARS	Zimbabwe	
	MCL	Medical Aviation Services	MEDIC	United Kingdom	
	MDF	Mediterranean Air Freight	MED-FREIGHT	Greece	
	MDY	Mediterranean Airways		Egypt	
	MEJ	Medjet International	MEDJET	United States	
	MGK	Mega	MEGLA	Kazakhstan	
	MEL	Mega Linhas Aéreas	MEGA AIR	Brazil	
M8	MKN	Mekong Airlines	MEKONG AIRLINES	Cambodia	Defunct
IM	MNJ	Menajet	MENAJET	Lebanon	
		Mercer Airlines		United States	Defunct
	MXX	Merchant Express Aviation	MERCHANT	Nigeria	
	MEC	Mercury Aircourier Service	MERCAIR	United States	
	POV	Meridian	AIR POLTAVA	Ukraine	
	MRD	Meridian Air Cargo	MERIDIAN	United States	
	MHL	Meridian Airlines	HASSIMAIR	Nigeria	
	DSL	Meridian Aviation	DIESEL	United Kingdom	
	MEM	Meridian Limited	MERIDIAN CHERRY	Ukraine	
IG	ISS	Meridiana	MERIDIANA	Italy	Callsign was MERAIR
	MEI	Merlin Airways	AVALON	United States	
MZ	MNA	Merpati Nusantara Airlines	MERPATI	Indonesia	
YV	ASH	Mesa Airlines	AIR SHUTTLE	United States	
XJ	MES	Mesaba Airlines	MESABA	United States	
	MSQ	Meta Linhas Aéreas	META	Brazil	
	MET	Meteorological Research Flight	METMAN	United Kingdom	METMAN1 callsign formerly used by FAAM Airborne Laboratory to 2025, operated by Airtask Group. Owned by the Met Office and currently not in use.
	MER	Methow Aviation	METHOW	United States	
	MVI	Metro Business Aviation		United Kingdom	
	MEX	Metro Express	EAGLE EXPRESS	United States	
	MTR	Metroflight	METRO	United States	
	MTJ	Metrojet	METROJET	Hong Kong	
	PIX	Metropix UK	METROPIX	United Kingdom	
	MPS	Metropolis	METRO REGIONAL	Netherlands	Metropolis Noord 1
	MXB	Mex Blue	MEX BLUE	Mexico	
	MJT	Mex-Jet	MEJETS	Mexico	
GJ	MXC	Mexicargo	MEXICARGO	Mexico	defunct
	MXA	Mexicana de Aviación	MEXICANA	Mexico	
	MXT	México Transportes Aéreos	TRANSMEX	Mexico	
	HUR	Miami Air Charter	HURRICANE CHARTER	United States	
LL	BSK	Miami Air International	BISCAYNE	United States	Previous IATA Code "GL"
	OWL	Miami Valley Aviation	NIGHT OWL	United States	
	MPT	Miapet-Avia	MIAPET	Armenia	
	BIB	Michelin Air Services		France	
	WIZ	Micromatter Technology Solutions	WIZARD	United Kingdom	
	NYL	Mid Airlines	NILE	Sudan	
	MPA	Mid-Pacific Airlines	MID PAC	United States	
	MJR	Midamerica Jet	MAJOR	United States	
ME	MEA	Middle East Airlines	CEDAR JET	Lebanon	
	MID	Midland Airport Services		United Kingdom	
	MFR	Midline Air Freight	MIDLINE FREIGHT	United States	
	MIS	Midstate Airlines	MIDSTATE	United States	
JI	MDW	Midway Airlines (1993–2003)	MIDWAY	United States	defunct
ML	MDW	Midway Airlines (1976–1991)	MIDWAY	United States	defunct
	FLA	Midway Express	PALM	United States	
	FAX	Midwest Air Freighters	FAIRFAX	United States	
YX	MEP	Midwest Airlines	MIDEX	United States	
MY	MWA	Midwest Airlines (Egypt)		Egypt	
	NIT	Midwest Aviation	NIGHTTRAIN	United States	
	MWT	Midwest Aviation Division	MIDWEST	United States	
	HTE	Midwest Helicopters De Mexico	HELICOPTERSMEXICO	Mexico	
MJ	MLR	Mihin Lanka	MIHIN LANKA	Sri Lanka	
	MAB	Millardair	MILLARDAIR	Canada	
	RJM	Millen Corporation	MILLEN	United Kingdom	
	MLK	Millennium Air	NIGERJET	Nigeria	
	DLK	Millennium Airlines	DEKKANLANKA	Sri Lanka	
	MFS	Miller Flying Services	MILLER TIME	United States	
	OXO	Million Air	MILL AIR	United States	
	MIM	Mimino	MIMINO	Russia	
	NAB	Mina Airline Company		Egypt	
	OMR	Minair	ORMINE	Central African Republic	
	EBE	Minebea Technologies	MINEBEA	United States	
	MAZ	Mines Air Services Zambia	MINES	Zambia	
	MNL	Miniliner	MINILINER	Italy	
	MNS	Ministic Air	MINISTIC	Canada	
	WDG	Ministry of Agriculture, Fisheries and Food	WATCHDOG	United Kingdom	
	LIR	Minsk Aircraft Overhaul Plant	LISLINE	Belarus	
	MIC	Mint Airways	MINT AIRWAYS	Spain	
	MIR	Miramichi Air Service	MIRAMICHI	Canada	
	MIF	Miras	MIRAS	Kazakhstan	
	MOS	Misr Overseas Airways		Egypt	
	MAF	Mission Aviation Fellowship	MISSI	Indonesia	
	MSN	Missionair	MISIONAIR	Spain	
	MRN	Missions Gouvernemtales Francaises	MARIANNE	France	
	BDG	Mississippi State University	BULLDOG	United States	
XV	MVA	Mississippi Valley Airlines	VALAIR	United States	
M4	MSA	Mistral Air	AIRMERCI	Italy	renamed Poste Air Cargo
	MJF	MJET	EM-EXPRESS	Austria	
	MBO	Mobil Oil	MOBIL	Canada	
	MXE	Mocambique Expresso	MOZAMBIQUE EXPRESS	Mozambique	
	MFZ	Mofaz Air	MOFAZ AIR	Malaysia	
	MOW	Mohawk Airlines	MOHAWK AIR	United States	
MW	MUL	Mokulele Airlines	MUKULELE	United States	Callsign and code changed from BUG/SPEEDBUGGY in 2013
	MLE	Moldaeroservice	MOLDAERO	Moldova	
2M	MDV	Moldavian Airlines	MOLDAVIAN	Moldova	
	MVG	Moldova	MOLDOVA-STATE	Moldova	
	RRV	Mombasa Air Safari	SKYROVER	Kenya	
ZB	MON	Monarch Airlines	MONARCH	United Kingdom	defunct October 2017
	MNH	Monarch Airlines	MONARCH AIR	United States	
8I		Myway Airlines		Italy	
	MFC	Moncton Flying Club	EAST WIND	Canada	
	MDB	Monde Air Charters	MONDEAIR CARGO	United Kingdom	
	MTI	Monerrey Air Taxi	MONTERREY AIR	Mexico	
	MKY	Monky Aerotaxis	MONKY	Mexico	
YM	MGX	Montenegro Airlines	MONTENEGRO	Montenegro	former callsign was "MONTAIR"
5M	MNT	Montserrat Airways	MONTSERRAT	Montserrat	
	MNY	Mooney Aircraft Corporation	MOONEY FLIGHT	United States	
	MAL	Morningstar Air Express	MORNINGSTAR	Canada	
	MSS	Morris Air Service	WASATCH	United States	
	MRO	Morrison Flying Service	MORRISON	United States	
3R	GAI	Moskovia Airlines	GROMOV AIRLINE	Russia	JSC
	MPI	Mosphil Aero	MOSPHIL	Philippines	
M9	MSI	Motor Sich Airlines	MOTOR SICH	Ukraine	
NM	NZM	Mount Cook Airline	MOUNTCOOK	New Zealand	
	MTN	Mountain Air Cargo	MOUNTAIN	United States	
N4	MTC	Mountain Air Company	MOUNTAIN LEONE	Sierra Leone	
	PKP	Mountain Air Express	PIKES PEAK	United States	
	BRR	Mountain Air Service	MOUNTAIN AIR	United States	
	MBI	Mountain Bird	MOUNTAIN BIRD	United States	
	MHA	Mountain High Aviation	MOUNTAIN HIGH	United States	
	MPC	Mountain Pacific Air	MOUNTAIN PACIFIC	Canada	
	MTV	Mountain Valley Air Service	MOUNTAIN VALLEY	United States	
	MDN	Mudan Airlines		Somali Republic	
	CMJ	Mudanjiang General Aviation	MUDANJIANG	China	
	MTX	Multi Taxi	MULTITAXI	Mexico	
	WBR	Multi-Aero	WEBER	United States	
	MFT	Multiflight	YORKAIR		
	MNZ	Murmansk Aircompany	MURMAN AIR	Russia	
	MUA	Murray Air	MURRAY AIR	United States	
	MMR	Musrata Air Transport	MUSRATA AIR	Libya	
	MAW	Mustique Airways	MUSTIQUE	Barbados	
Z9	MYM	MYAirline	MYAIR	Malaysia	defunct
	MYW	MyWay Airlines	MYSKY	Georgia	
VZ	MYT	MyTravel Airways	KESTREL	United Kingdom	Defunct, callsign now used by Thomas Cook Airlines
UB	UBA	Myanma Airways	UNIONAIR	Myanmar	
8M	MMA	Myanmar Airways International	MYANMAR	Myanmar	
	MAV	Minoan Air	MINOAN	Greece	Now were days ICAO was used by Manta Air
	MYA	Myflug	MYFLUG	Iceland	
	VKG	MyTravel Airways	VIKING	Denmark	defunct; callsign now used by Thomas Cook Airlines Scandinavia
	AAD	Mann Air Ltd	Ambassador	United Kingdom	t/a Ambassador
M2	MHV	MHS Aviation GmbH	SNOWCAP	Germany	
	MTU	Middle Tennessee State University	BLUE RAIDER	United States	2019

== IATA Traffic Conference Areas ==
The International Air Transport Association (IATA) divides the world into three areas called the Traffic Conference Areas (TCAs) for air travel purposes. These areas are used to define geographical boundaries for fare construction and other industry-related practices:

- Traffic Conference Area 1 (TC1) – this area includes the Americas, encompassing North America (the Caribbean, Central America, and Northern America) and South America.
- Traffic Conference Area 2 (TC2) – this area includes the EMEA region, encompassing Europe, the Middle East, and Africa (North Africa and Sub-Saharan Africa).
- Traffic Conference Area 3 (TC3) – this area includes the Asia–Pacific region, encompassing the rest of Asia (Central Asia, East Asia, North Asia, South Asia, and Southeast Asia) and Oceania.

Essentially, TC1 covers the "New World", while TC2 and TC3 together cover the "Old World" (Africa-Eurasia) and the "Land Down Under".

== See also ==
- IATA airport code
- ICAO airport code
