= MFZ (disambiguation) =

MFZ is the Mocha Fracture Zone, a transform fault on the Nazca Plate.

MFZ may also refer to:

- Mabaan language, spoken in Sudan (by ISO 639 code)
- Mofaz Air, a Malaysian airline (by ICAO code)
- Mesalia Airport, Papua New Guinea (by IATA code)
