= Maxair =

Maxair may refer to:

- Pirbuterol, trade name for a pharmaceutical used in the treatment of asthma
- maXair (ride), a thrill ride at Cedar Point
- Maxair (aviation), a former Swedish airline
- Max Air, a Nigerian airline
