= List of birds of Mali =

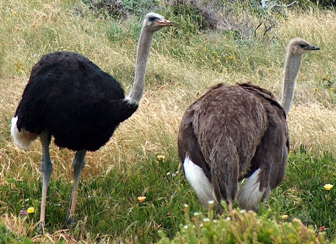
Common ostrich (Struthio camelus)

This is a list of the bird species recorded in Mali. The avifauna of Mali include a total of 617 species, of which one is endemic.

This list's taxonomic treatment (designation and sequence of orders, families and species) and nomenclature (common and scientific names) follow the conventions of The Clements Checklist of Birds of the World, 2022 edition. The family accounts at the beginning of each heading reflect this taxonomy, as do the species counts found in each family account. Accidental species are included in the total species count for Mali.

The following tags have been used to highlight several categories. The commonly occurring native species do not fall into any of these categories.

- (A) Accidental - a species that rarely or accidentally occurs in Mali
- (E) Endemic - a species endemic to Mali

== Ostriches ==
Order: Struthioniformes Family: Struthionidae

The ostrich is a flightless bird native to Africa. It is the largest living species of bird. It is distinctive in its appearance, with a long neck and legs and the ability to run at high speeds.

- Common ostrich, Struthio camelus

== Ducks, geese, and waterfowl ==
Order: Anseriformes Family: Anatidae

Anatidae includes the ducks and most duck-like waterfowl, such as geese and swans. These birds are adapted to an aquatic existence with webbed feet, flattened bills, and feathers that are excellent at shedding water due to an oily coating.

- White-faced whistling-duck, Dendrocygna viduata
- Fulvous whistling-duck, Dendrocygna bicolor
- White-backed duck, Thalassornis leuconotus
- Taiga bean-goose, Anser fabalis (A)
- Knob-billed duck, Sarkidiornis melanotos
- Egyptian goose, Alopochen aegyptiacus
- Common shelduck, Tadorna tadorna (A)
- Spur-winged goose, Plectropterus gambensis
- African pygmy-goose, Nettapus auritus
- Garganey, Spatula querquedula
- Blue-billed teal, Spatula hottentota
- Northern shoveler, Spatula clypeata
- Gadwall, Mareca strepera
- Eurasian wigeon, Mareca penelope
- Mallard, Anas platyrhynchos
- Red-billed duck, Anas erythrorhyncha
- Northern pintail, Anas acuta
- Green-winged teal, Anas crecca
- Marbled teal, Marmaronetta angustirostris
- Common pochard, Aythya ferina
- Ferruginous duck, Aythya nyroca
- Tufted duck, Aythya fuligula

== Guineafowl ==
Order: Galliformes Family: Numididae

Guineafowl are a group of African, seed-eating, ground-nesting birds that resemble partridges, but with featherless heads and spangled grey plumage.

- Helmeted guineafowl, Numida meleagris

== New World quail ==
Order: Galliformes Family: Odontophoridae

Despite their family's common name, this species and one other are native to Africa.

- Stone partridge, Ptilopachus petrosus

== Pheasants, grouse, and allies ==
Order: Galliformes Family: Phasianidae

The Phasianidae are a family of terrestrial birds which consists of quails, snowcocks, francolins, spurfowls, tragopans, monals, pheasants, peafowls and jungle fowls. In general, they are plump (although they vary in size) and have broad, relatively short wings.

- Coqui francolin, Campocolinus coqui
- White-throated francolin, Campocolinus albogularis
- Blue quail, Synoicus adansonii (A)
- Common quail, Coturnix coturnix
- Harlequin quail, Coturnix delegorguei
- Double-spurred francolin, Pternistis bicalcaratus
- Clapperton's francolin, Pternistis clappertoni

== Grebes ==
Order: Podicipediformes Family: Podicipedidae

Grebes are small to medium-large freshwater diving birds. They have lobed toes and are excellent swimmers and divers. However, they have their feet placed far back on the body, making them quite ungainly on land.

- Little grebe, Tachybaptus ruficollis
- Great crested grebe, Podiceps cristatus

== Pigeons and doves ==
Order: Columbiformes Family: Columbidae

Pigeons and doves are stout-bodied birds with short necks and short slender bills with a fleshy cere.

- Rock pigeon, Columba livia
- Speckled pigeon, Columba guinea
- European turtle-dove, Streptopelia turtur
- Adamawa turtle-dove, Streptopelia hypopyrrha
- African collared-dove, Streptopelia roseogrisea
- Mourning collared-dove, Streptopelia decipiens
- Red-eyed dove, Streptopelia semitorquata
- Vinaceous dove, Streptopelia vinacea
- Laughing dove, Streptopelia senegalensis
- Black-billed wood-dove, Turtur abyssinicus
- Blue-spotted wood-dove, Turtur afer
- Namaqua dove, Oena capensis
- Bruce's green-pigeon, Treron waalia
- African green-pigeon, Treron calva

== Sandgrouse ==
Order: Pterocliformes Family: Pteroclidae

Sandgrouse have small, pigeon like heads and necks, but sturdy compact bodies. They have long pointed wings and sometimes tails and a fast direct flight. Flocks fly to watering holes at dawn and dusk. Their legs are feathered down to the toes.

- Chestnut-bellied sandgrouse, Pterocles exustus
- Spotted sandgrouse, Pterocles senegallus
- Crowned sandgrouse, Pterocles coronatus (A)
- Lichtenstein's sandgrouse, Pterocles lichtensteinii
- Four-banded sandgrouse, Pterocles quadricinctus

== Bustards ==
Order: Otidiformes Family: Otididae

Bustards are large terrestrial birds mainly associated with dry open country and steppes in the Old World. They are omnivorous and nest on the ground. They walk steadily on strong legs and big toes, pecking for food as they go. They have long broad wings with "fingered" wingtips and striking patterns in flight. Many have interesting mating displays.

- Arabian bustard, Ardeotis arabs
- Denham's bustard, Neotis denhami
- Nubian bustard, Neotis nuba
- White-bellied bustard, Eupodotis senegalensis
- Savile's bustard, Lophotis savilei
- Black-bellied bustard, Lissotis melanogaster

== Turacos ==
Order: Musophagiformes Family: Musophagidae

The turacos, plantain eaters and go-away-birds make up the bird family Musophagidae. They are medium-sized arboreal birds. The turacos and plantain eaters are brightly coloured, usually in blue, green or purple. The go-away birds are mostly grey and white.

- Guinea turaco, Tauraco persa
- Violet turaco, Musophaga violacea
- Western plantain-eater, Crinifer piscator

== Cuckoos ==
Order: Cuculiformes Family: Cuculidae

The family Cuculidae includes cuckoos, roadrunners and anis. These birds are of variable size with slender bodies, long tails and strong legs. The Old World cuckoos are brood parasites.

- Senegal coucal, Centropus senegalensis
- Blue-headed coucal, Centropus monachus
- Black coucal, Centropus grillii
- Great spotted cuckoo, Clamator glandarius
- Levaillant's cuckoo, Clamator levaillantii
- Pied cuckoo, Clamator jacobinus
- Thick-billed cuckoo, Pachycoccyx audeberti
- Dideric cuckoo, Chrysococcyx caprius
- Klaas's cuckoo, Chrysococcyx klaas
- Black cuckoo, Cuculus clamosus
- Red-chested cuckoo, Cuculus solitarius (A)
- African cuckoo, Cuculus gularis
- Common cuckoo, Cuculus canorus

== Nightjars and allies ==
Order: Caprimulgiformes Family: Caprimulgidae

Nightjars are medium-sized nocturnal birds that usually nest on the ground. They have long wings, short legs and very short bills. Most have small feet, of little use for walking, and long pointed wings. Their soft plumage is camouflaged to resemble bark or leaves.

- Standard-winged nightjar, Caprimulgus longipennis
- Red-necked nightjar, Caprimulgus ruficollis
- Eurasian nightjar, Caprimulgus europaeus (A)
- Egyptian nightjar, Caprimulgus aegyptius
- Golden nightjar, Caprimulgus eximius
- Fiery-necked nightjar, Caprimulgus pectoralis
- Swamp nightjar, Caprimulgus natalensis
- Plain nightjar, Caprimulgus inornatus
- Freckled nightjar, Caprimulgus tristigma
- Long-tailed nightjar, Caprimulgus climacurus

== Swifts ==
Order: Caprimulgiformes Family: Apodidae

Swifts are small birds which spend the majority of their lives flying. These birds have very short legs and never settle voluntarily on the ground, perching instead only on vertical surfaces. Many swifts have long swept-back wings which resemble a crescent or boomerang.

- Mottled spinetail, Telacanthura ussheri
- Alpine swift, Apus melba
- Mottled swift, Apus aequatorialis
- Common swift, Apus apus
- Plain swift, Apus unicolor (A)
- Pallid swift, Apus pallidus
- Little swift, Apus affinis
- White-rumped swift, Apus caffer
- African palm-swift, Cypsiurus parvus

== Flufftails ==
Order: Gruiformes Family: Sarothruridae

The flufftails are a small family of ground-dwelling birds found only in Madagascar and sub-Saharan Africa.

- Streaky-breasted flufftail, Sarothrura boehmi

== Rails, gallinules and coots ==
Order: Gruiformes Family: Rallidae

Rallidae is a large family of small to medium-sized birds which includes the rails, crakes, coots and gallinules. Typically they inhabit dense vegetation in damp environments near lakes, swamps or rivers. In general they are shy and secretive birds, making them difficult to observe. Most species have strong legs and long toes which are well adapted to soft uneven surfaces. They tend to have short, rounded wings and to be weak fliers.

- Corn crake, Crex crex
- African crake, Crex egregia
- Spotted crake, Porzana porzana
- Lesser moorhen, Paragallinula angulata
- Eurasian moorhen, Gallinula chloropus
- Eurasian coot, Fulica atra
- Allen's gallinule, Porphyrio alleni
- African swamphen, Porphyrio madagascariensis
- Black crake, Zapornia flavirostris
- Little crake, Zapornia parva
- Baillon's crake, Zapornia pusilla

== Finfoots ==
Order: Gruiformes Family: Heliornithidae

Heliornithidae is a small family of tropical birds with webbed lobes on their feet similar to those of grebes and coots.

- African finfoot, Podica senegalensis

== Cranes ==
Order: Gruiformes Family: Gruidae

Cranes are large, long-legged and long-necked birds. Unlike the similar-looking but unrelated herons, cranes fly with necks outstretched, not pulled back. Most have elaborate and noisy courting displays or "dances".

- Black crowned-crane, Balearica pavonina

== Thick-knees ==
Order: Charadriiformes Family: Burhinidae

The thick-knees are a group of largely tropical waders in the family Burhinidae. They are found worldwide within the tropical zone, with some species also breeding in temperate Europe and Australia. They are medium to large waders with strong black or yellow-black bills, large yellow eyes and cryptic plumage. Despite being classed as waders, most species have a preference for arid or semi-arid habitats.

- Eurasian thick-knee, Burhinus oedicnemus
- Senegal thick-knee, Burhinus senegalensis
- Spotted thick-knee, Burhinus capensis

== Egyptian plover ==
Order: Charadriiformes Family: Pluvianidae

The Egyptian plover is found across equatorial Africa and along the Nile River.

- Egyptian plover, Pluvianus aegyptius

== Stilts and avocets ==
Order: Charadriiformes Family: Recurvirostridae

Recurvirostridae is a family of large wading birds, which includes the avocets and stilts. The avocets have long legs and long up-curved bills. The stilts have extremely long legs and long, thin, straight bills.

- Black-winged stilt, Himantopus himantopus
- Pied avocet, Recurvirostra avosetta

== Oystercatchers ==
Order: Charadriiformes Family: Haematopodidae

The oystercatchers are large and noisy plover-like birds, with strong bills used for smashing or prising open molluscs.

- Eurasian oystercatcher, Haematopus ostralegus

== Plovers and lapwings ==
Order: Charadriiformes Family: Charadriidae

The family Charadriidae includes the plovers, dotterels and lapwings. They are small to medium-sized birds with compact bodies, short, thick necks and long, usually pointed, wings. They are found in open country worldwide, mostly in habitats near water.

- Black-bellied plover, Pluvialis squatarola (A)
- Spur-winged lapwing, Vanellus spinosus
- Black-headed lapwing, Vanellus tectus
- White-headed lapwing, Vanellus albiceps
- Senegal lapwing, Vanellus lugubris
- Wattled lapwing, Vanellus senegallus
- Caspian plover, Charadrius asiaticus
- Kittlitz's plover, Charadrius pecuarius
- Kentish plover, Charadrius alexandrinus
- Common ringed plover, Charadrius hiaticula
- Little ringed plover, Charadrius dubius
- Three-banded plover, Charadrius tricollaris
- Forbes's plover, Charadrius forbesi (A)
- White-fronted plover, Charadrius marginatus

== Painted-snipes ==
Order: Charadriiformes Family: Rostratulidae

Painted-snipes are short-legged, long-billed birds similar in shape to the true snipes, but more brightly coloured.

- Greater painted-snipe, Rostratula benghalensis

== Jacanas ==
Order: Charadriiformes Family: Jacanidae

The jacanas are a group of tropical waders in the family Jacanidae. They are found throughout the tropics. They are identifiable by their huge feet and claws which enable them to walk on floating vegetation in the shallow lakes that are their preferred habitat.

- Lesser jacana, Microparra capensis
- African jacana, Actophilornis africanus

== Sandpipers and allies ==
Order: Charadriiformes Family: Scolopacidae

Scolopacidae is a large diverse family of small to medium-sized shorebirds including the sandpipers, curlews, godwits, shanks, tattlers, woodcocks, snipes, dowitchers and phalaropes. The majority of these species eat small invertebrates picked out of the mud or soil. Variation in length of legs and bills enables multiple species to feed in the same habitat, particularly on the coast, without direct competition for food.

- Whimbrel, Numenius phaeopus
- Eurasian curlew, Numenius arquata
- Bar-tailed godwit, Limosa lapponica (A)
- Black-tailed godwit, Limosa limosa
- Ruddy turnstone, Arenaria interpres
- Red knot, Calidris canutus
- Ruff, Calidris pugnax
- Broad-billed sandpiper, Calidris falcinellus
- Curlew sandpiper, Calidris ferruginea
- Temminck's stint, Calidris temminckii
- Sanderling, Calidris alba
- Dunlin, Calidris alpina
- Little stint, Calidris minuta
- Jack snipe, Lymnocryptes minimus
- Great snipe, Gallinago media
- Common snipe, Gallinago gallinago
- Terek sandpiper, Xenus cinereus (A)
- Red phalarope, Phalaropus fulicarius (A)
- Common sandpiper, Actitis hypoleucos
- Green sandpiper, Tringa ochropus
- Spotted redshank, Tringa erythropus
- Common greenshank, Tringa nebularia
- Marsh sandpiper, Tringa stagnatilis
- Wood sandpiper, Tringa glareola
- Common redshank, Tringa totanus

== Buttonquail ==
Order: Charadriiformes Family: Turnicidae

The buttonquail are small, drab, running birds which resemble the true quails. The female is the brighter of the sexes and initiates courtship. The male incubates the eggs and tends the young.

- Small buttonquail, Turnix sylvatica
- Black-rumped buttonquail, Turnix nanus (A)
- Quail-plover, Ortyxelos meiffrenii

== Pratincoles and coursers ==
Order: Charadriiformes Family: Glareolidae

Glareolidae is a family of wading birds comprising the pratincoles, which have short legs, long pointed wings and long forked tails, and the coursers, which have long legs, short wings and long, pointed bills which curve downwards.

- Cream-colored courser, Cursorius cursor
- Temminck's courser, Cursorius temminckii
- Bronze-winged courser, Rhinoptilus chalcopterus
- Collared pratincole, Glareola pratincola
- Black-winged pratincole, Glareola nordmanni
- Rock pratincole, Glareola nuchalis
- Gray pratincole, Glareola cinerea

== Skuas and jaegers ==
Order: Charadriiformes Family: Stercorariidae

The family Stercorariidae are, in general, medium to large birds, typically with grey or brown plumage, often with white markings on the wings. They nest on the ground in temperate and arctic regions and are long-distance migrants.

- Long-tailed jaeger, Stercorarius longicaudus (A)

== Gulls, terns, and skimmers ==
Order: Charadriiformes Family: Laridae

Laridae is a family of medium to large seabirds, the gulls, terns, and skimmers. Gulls are typically grey or white, often with black markings on the head or wings. They have stout, longish bills and webbed feet. Terns are a group of generally medium to large seabirds typically with grey or white plumage, often with black markings on the head. Most terns hunt fish by diving but some pick insects off the surface of fresh water. Terns are generally long-lived birds, with several species known to live in excess of 30 years. Skimmers are a small family of tropical tern-like birds. They have an elongated lower mandible which they use to feed by flying low over the water surface and skimming the water for small fish.

- Slender-billed gull, Chroicocephalus genei (A)
- Black-headed gull, Chroicocephalus ridibundus
- Little gull, Hydrocoloeus minutus (A)
- Audouin's gull, Ichthyaetus audouinii (A)
- Caspian gull, Larus cachinnans
- Lesser black-backed gull, Larus fuscus
- Little tern, Sternula albifrons
- Gull-billed tern, Gelochelidon nilotica
- Caspian tern, Hydroprogne caspia
- Black tern, Chlidonias niger (A)
- White-winged tern, Chlidonias leucopterus
- Whiskered tern, Chlidonias hybrida
- Roseate tern, Sterna dougallii
- Common tern, Sterna hirundo
- Sandwich tern, Thalasseus sandvicensis
- African skimmer, Rynchops flavirostris

== Storks ==
Order: Ciconiiformes Family: Ciconiidae

Storks are large, long-legged, long-necked, wading birds with long, stout bills. Storks are mute, but bill-clattering is an important mode of communication at the nest. Their nests can be large and may be reused for many years. Many species are migratory.

- African openbill, Anastomus lamelligerus
- Black stork, Ciconia nigra
- Abdim's stork, Ciconia abdimii
- African woolly-necked stork, Ciconia microscelis
- White stork, Ciconia ciconia
- Saddle-billed stork, Ephippiorhynchus senegalensis
- Marabou stork, Leptoptilos crumenifer
- Yellow-billed stork, Mycteria ibis

== Anhingas ==
Order: Suliformes Family: Anhingidae

Anhingas or darters are often called "snake-birds" because of their long thin neck, which gives a snake-like appearance when they swim with their bodies submerged. The males have black and dark-brown plumage, an erectile crest on the nape and a larger bill than the female. The females have much paler plumage especially on the neck and underparts. The darters have completely webbed feet and their legs are short and set far back on the body. Their plumage is somewhat permeable, like that of cormorants, and they spread their wings to dry after diving.

- African darter, Anhinga melanogaster

== Cormorants and shags ==
Order: Suliformes Family: Phalacrocoracidae

Phalacrocoracidae is a family of medium to large coastal, fish-eating seabirds that includes cormorants and shags. Plumage colouration varies, with the majority having mainly dark plumage, some species being black-and-white and a few being colourful.

- Long-tailed cormorant, Microcarbo africanus

== Pelicans ==
Order: Pelecaniformes Family: Pelecanidae

Pelicans are large water birds with a distinctive pouch under their beak. As with other members of the order Pelecaniformes, they have webbed feet with four toes.

- Great white pelican, Pelecanus onocrotalus
- Pink-backed pelican, Pelecanus rufescens

== Shoebill ==
Order: Pelecaniformes Family: Balaenicipididae

The shoebill is a large bird related to the storks. It derives its name from its massive shoe-shaped bill.

- Shoebill, Balaeniceps rex (A)

== Hammerkop ==
Order: Pelecaniformes Family: Scopidae

The hammerkop is a medium-sized bird with a long shaggy crest. The shape of its head with a curved bill and crest at the back is reminiscent of a hammer, hence its name. Its plumage is drab-brown all over.

- Hamerkop, Scopus umbretta

== Herons, egrets, and bitterns ==
Order: Pelecaniformes Family: Ardeidae

The family Ardeidae contains the bitterns, herons and egrets. Herons and egrets are medium to large wading birds with long necks and legs. Bitterns tend to be shorter necked and more wary. Members of Ardeidae fly with their necks retracted, unlike other long-necked birds such as storks, ibises and spoonbills.

- Great bittern, Botaurus stellaris
- Little bittern, Ixobrychus minutus
- Dwarf bittern, Ixobrychus sturmii
- Gray heron, Ardea cinerea
- Black-headed heron, Ardea melanocephala
- Goliath heron, Ardea goliath
- Purple heron, Ardea purpurea
- Great egret, Ardea alba
- Intermediate egret, Ardea intermedia
- Little egret, Egretta garzetta
- Western reef-heron, Egretta gularis
- Black heron, Egretta ardesiaca
- Cattle egret, Bubulcus ibis
- Squacco heron, Ardeola ralloides
- Rufous-bellied heron, Ardeola rufiventris
- Striated heron, Butorides striata
- Black-crowned night-heron, Nycticorax nycticorax
- White-backed night-heron, Gorsachius leuconotus

== Ibises and spoonbills ==
Order: Pelecaniformes Family: Threskiornithidae

Threskiornithidae is a family of large terrestrial and wading birds which includes the ibises and spoonbills. They have long, broad wings with 11 primary and about 20 secondary feathers. They are strong fliers and despite their size and weight, very capable soarers.

- Glossy ibis, Plegadis falcinellus
- African sacred ibis, Threskiornis aethiopicus
- Northern bald ibis, Geronticus eremita
- Hadada ibis, Bostrychia hagedash
- Eurasian spoonbill, Platalea leucorodia
- African spoonbill, Platalea alba

== Secretarybird ==
Order: Accipitriformes Family: Sagittariidae

The secretarybird is a bird of prey in the order Accipitriformes but is easily distinguished from other raptors by its long crane-like legs.

- Secretarybird, Sagittarius serpentarius

== Osprey ==
Order: Accipitriformes Family: Pandionidae

Genus species and also some cuckoo birdlings which are very rare in this cold environment. The family Pandionidae contains only one species, the osprey. The osprey is a medium-large raptor which is a specialist fish-eater with a worldwide distribution.

- Osprey, Pandion haliaetus

== Hawks, kites and eagles ==
Order: Accipitriformes Family: Accipitridae

Accipitridae is a family of birds of prey, which includes hawks, eagles, kites, harriers and Old World vultures. These birds have powerful hooked beaks for tearing flesh from their prey, strong legs, powerful talons and keen eyesight.

- Black-winged kite, Elanus caeruleus
- Scissor-tailed kite, Chelictinia riocourii
- African harrier-hawk, Polyboroides typus
- Palm-nut vulture, Gypohierax angolensis
- Egyptian vulture, Neophron percnopterus
- European honey-buzzard, Pernis apivorus
- African cuckoo-hawk, Aviceda cuculoides
- White-headed vulture, Trigonoceps occipitalis
- Lappet-faced vulture, Torgos tracheliotos
- Hooded vulture, Necrosyrtes monachus
- White-backed vulture, Gyps africanus
- Rüppell's griffon, Gyps rueppelli
- Eurasian griffon, Gyps fulvus
- Bateleur, Terathopius ecaudatus
- Short-toed snake-eagle, Circaetus gallicus
- Beaudouin's snake-eagle, Circaetus beaudouini
- Brown snake-eagle, Circaetus cinereus
- Banded snake-eagle, Circaetus cinerascens
- Bat hawk, Macheiramphus alcinus
- Martial eagle, Polemaetus bellicosus
- Long-crested eagle, Lophaetus occipitalis
- Lesser spotted eagle, Clanga pomarina
- Wahlberg's eagle, Hieraaetus wahlbergi
- Booted eagle, Hieraaetus pennatus
- Ayres's hawk-eagle, Hieraaetus ayresii
- Tawny eagle, Aquila rapax
- Steppe eagle, Aquila nipalensis
- Imperial Eagle, Aquila heliaca (A)
- Golden eagle, Aquila chrysaetos
- Verreaux's eagle, Aquila verreauxii
- African hawk-eagle, Aquila spilogaster
- Lizard buzzard, Kaupifalco monogrammicus
- Dark chanting-goshawk, Melierax metabates
- Gabar goshawk, Micronisus gabar
- Grasshopper buzzard, Butastur rufipennis
- Eurasian marsh-harrier, Circus aeruginosus
- Pallid harrier, Circus macrourus
- Montagu's harrier, Circus pygargus
- Shikra, Accipiter badius
- Ovampo sparrowhawk, Accipiter ovampensis
- Eurasian sparrowhawk, Accipiter nisus
- Black kite, Milvus migrans
- African fish-eagle, Haliaeetus vocifer
- Common buzzard, Buteo buteo
- Long-legged buzzard, Buteo rufinus
- Red-necked buzzard, Buteo auguralis

== Barn-owls ==
Order: Strigiformes Family: Tytonidae

Barn-owls are medium to large owls with large heads and characteristic heart-shaped faces. They have long strong legs with powerful talons.

- Western barn owl, Tyto alba

== Owls ==
Order: Strigiformes Family: Strigidae

The typical owls are small to large solitary nocturnal birds of prey. They have large forward-facing eyes and ears, a hawk-like beak and a conspicuous circle of feathers around each eye called a facial disk.

- Eurasian scops-owl, Otus scops
- African scops-owl, Otus senegalensis
- Northern white-faced owl, Ptilopsis leucotis
- Pharaoh eagle-owl, Bubo ascalaphus
- Grayish eagle-owl, Bubo cinerascens
- Verreaux's eagle-owl, Bubo lacteus
- Pel's fishing-owl, Scotopelia peli
- Pearl-spotted owlet, Glaucidium perlatum
- Little owl, Athene noctua
- Short-eared owl, Asio flammeus
- Marsh owl, Asio capensis

== Mousebirds ==
Order: Coliiformes Family: Coliidae

The mousebirds are slender greyish or brown birds with soft, hairlike body feathers and very long thin tails. They are arboreal and scurry through the leaves like rodents in search of berries, fruit and buds. They are acrobatic and can feed upside down. All species have strong claws and reversible outer toes. They also have crests and stubby bills.

- Blue-naped mousebird, Urocolius macrourus

== Trogons ==
Order: Trogoniformes Family: Trogonidae

The family Trogonidae includes trogons and quetzals. Found in tropical woodlands worldwide, they feed on insects and fruit, and their broad bills and weak legs reflect their diet and arboreal habits. Although their flight is fast, they are reluctant to fly any distance. Trogons have soft, often colourful, feathers with distinctive male and female plumage.

- Narina trogon, Apaloderma narina

== Hoopoes ==
Order: Bucerotiformes Family: Upupidae

Hoopoes have black, white and orangey-pink colouring with a large erectile crest on their head.

- Eurasian hoopoe, Upupa epops

== Woodhoopoes and scimitarbills ==
Order: Bucerotiformes Family: Phoeniculidae

The woodhoopoes are related to the kingfishers, rollers and hoopoes. They most resemble the hoopoes with their long curved bills, used to probe for insects, and short rounded wings. However, they differ in that they have metallic plumage, often blue, green or purple, and lack an erectile crest.

- Green woodhoopoe, Phoeniculus purpureus
- Black scimitarbill, Rhinopomastus aterrimus

== Ground-hornbills ==
Order: Bucerotiformes Family: Bucorvidae

The ground-hornbills are terrestrial birds which feed almost entirely on insects, other birds, snakes, and amphibians.

- Abyssinian ground-hornbill, Bucorvus abyssinicus

== Hornbills ==
Order: Bucerotiformes Family: Bucerotidae

Hornbills are a group of birds whose bill is shaped like a cow's horn, but without a twist, sometimes with a casque on the upper mandible. Frequently, the bill is brightly coloured.

- African gray hornbill, Lophoceros nasutus
- Western red-billed hornbill, Tockus kempi
- Northern red-billed hornbill, Tockus erythrorhynchus (A)

== Kingfishers ==
Order: Coraciiformes Family: Alcedinidae

Kingfishers are medium-sized birds with large heads, long, pointed bills, short legs and stubby tails.

- Shining-blue kingfisher, Alcedo quadribrachys
- Malachite kingfisher, Corythornis cristatus
- White-bellied kingfisher, Corythornis leucogaster
- African pygmy kingfisher, Ispidina picta
- Gray-headed kingfisher, Halcyon leucocephala
- Woodland kingfisher, Halcyon senegalensis
- Blue-breasted kingfisher, Halcyon malimbica
- Striped kingfisher, Halcyon chelicuti
- Giant kingfisher, Megaceryle maximus
- Pied kingfisher, Ceryle rudis

== Bee-eaters ==
Order: Coraciiformes Family: Meropidae

The bee-eaters are a group of near passerine birds in the family Meropidae. Most species are found in Africa but others occur in southern Europe, Madagascar, Australia and New Guinea. They are characterised by richly coloured plumage, slender bodies and usually elongated central tail feathers. All are colourful and have long downturned bills and pointed wings, which give them a swallow-like appearance when seen from afar.

- Blue-moustached bee-eater, Merops mentalis
- Red-throated bee-eater, Merops bulocki
- Little bee-eater, Merops pusillus
- Swallow-tailed bee-eater, Merops hirundineus
- White-throated bee-eater, Merops albicollis
- African green bee-eater, Merops viridissimus
- Blue-cheeked bee-eater, Merops persicus
- European bee-eater, Merops apiaster
- Northern carmine bee-eater, Merops nubicus

== Rollers ==
Order: Coraciiformes Family: Coraciidae

Rollers resemble crows in size and build, but are more closely related to the kingfishers and bee-eaters. They share the colourful appearance of those groups with blues and browns predominating. The two inner front toes are connected, but the outer toe is not.

- European roller, Coracias garrulus
- Abyssinian roller, Coracias abyssinica
- Rufous-crowned roller, Coracias naevia
- Blue-bellied roller, Coracias cyanogaster
- Broad-billed roller, Eurystomus glaucurus

== African barbets ==
Order: Piciformes Family: Lybiidae

The African barbets are plump birds, with short necks and large heads. They get their name from the bristles which fringe their heavy bills. Most species are brightly coloured.

- Yellow-breasted barbet, Trachyphonus margaritatus
- Yellow-rumped tinkerbird, Pogoniulus bilineatus
- Yellow-fronted tinkerbird, Pogoniulus chrysoconus
- Vieillot's barbet, Lybius vieilloti
- Bearded barbet, Lybius dubius

== Honeyguides ==
Order: Piciformes Family: Indicatoridae

Honeyguides are among the few birds that feed on wax. They are named for the greater honeyguide which leads traditional honey-hunters to bees' nests and, after the hunters have harvested the honey, feeds on the remaining contents of the hive.

- Wahlberg's honeyguide, Prodotiscus regulus (A)
- Lesser honeyguide, Indicator minor
- Greater honeyguide, Indicator indicator

== Woodpeckers ==
Order: Piciformes Family: Picidae

Woodpeckers are small to medium-sized birds with chisel-like beaks, short legs, stiff tails and long tongues used for capturing insects. Some species have feet with two toes pointing forward and two backward, while several species have only three toes. Many woodpeckers have the habit of tapping noisily on tree trunks with their beaks.

- Eurasian wryneck, Jynx torquilla
- Little gray woodpecker, Dendropicos elachus
- Cardinal woodpecker, Dendropicos fuscescens
- Brown-backed woodpecker, Dendropicos obsoletus
- African gray woodpecker, Dendropicos goertae
- Buff-spotted woodpecker, Campethera nivosa
- Fine-spotted woodpecker, Campethera punctuligera
- Golden-tailed woodpecker, Campethera abingoni

== Falcons and caracaras ==
Order: Falconiformes Family: Falconidae

Falconidae is a family of diurnal birds of prey. They differ from hawks, eagles and kites in that they kill with their beaks instead of their talons.

- Lesser kestrel, Falco naumanni
- Eurasian kestrel, Falco tinnunculus
- Fox kestrel, Falco alopex
- Gray kestrel, Falco ardosiaceus
- Red-necked falcon, Falco chicquera
- Red-footed falcon, Falco vespertinus
- Eleonora's falcon, Falco eleonorae
- Eurasian hobby, Falco subbuteo
- African hobby, Falco cuvierii
- Lanner falcon, Falco biarmicus
- Peregrine falcon, Falco peregrinus

== Old World parrots ==
Order: Psittaciformes Family: Psittaculidae

Characteristic features of parrots include a strong curved bill, an upright stance, strong legs, and clawed zygodactyl feet. Many parrots are vividly colored, and some are multi-colored. In size they range from 8 cm (3.1 in) to 1 m (3.3 ft) in length. Old World parrots are found from Africa east across south and southeast Asia and Oceania to Australia and New Zealand.

- Rose-ringed parakeet, Psittacula krameri
- Red-headed lovebird, Agapornis pullarius

== African and New World parrots ==
Order: Psittaciformes Family: Psittacidae

Characteristic features of parrots include a strong curved bill, an upright stance, strong legs, and clawed zygodactyl feet. Many parrots are vividly coloured, and some are multi-coloured. In size they range from 8 cm (3.1 in) to 1 m (3.3 ft) in length. Most of the more than 150 species in this family are found in the New World.

- Meyer's parrot, Poicephalus meyeri
- Senegal parrot, Poicephalus senegalus

== Pittas ==
Order: Passeriformes Family: Pittidae

Pittas are medium-sized by passerine standards and are stocky, with fairly long, strong legs, short tails and stout bills. Many are brightly coloured. They spend the majority of their time on wet forest floors, eating snails, insects and similar invertebrates.

- African pitta, Pitta angolensis (A)

== Cuckooshrikes ==
Order: Passeriformes Family: Campephagidae

The cuckooshrikes are small to medium-sized passerine birds. They are predominantly greyish with white and black, although some species are brightly coloured.

- White-breasted cuckooshrike, Coracina pectoralis
- Red-shouldered cuckooshrike, Campephaga phoenicea

== Old World orioles ==
Order: Passeriformes Family: Oriolidae

The Old World orioles are colourful passerine birds. They are not related to the New World orioles.

- Eurasian golden oriole, Oriolus oriolus (A)
- African golden oriole, Oriolus auratus

== Wattle-eyes and batises ==
Order: Passeriformes Family: Platysteiridae

The wattle-eyes, or puffback flycatchers, are small stout passerine birds of the African tropics. They get their name from the brightly coloured fleshy eye decorations found in most species in this group.

- Brown-throated wattle-eye, Platysteira cyanea
- Senegal batis, Batis senegalensis

== Vangas, helmetshrikes, and allies ==
Order: Passeriformes Family: Vangidae

The helmetshrikes are similar in build to the shrikes, but tend to be colourful species with distinctive crests or other head ornaments, such as wattles, from which they get their name.

- White helmetshrike, Prionops plumatus

== Bushshrikes and allies ==
Order: Passeriformes Family: Malaconotidae

Bushshrikes are similar in habits to shrikes, hunting insects and other small prey from a perch on a bush. Although similar in build to the shrikes, these tend to be either colourful species or largely black; some species are quite secretive.

- Brubru, Nilaus afer
- Northern puffback, Dryoscopus gambensis
- Black-crowned tchagra, Tchagra senegala
- Tropical boubou, Laniarius major
- Yellow-crowned gonolek, Laniarius barbarus
- Sulphur-breasted bushshrike, Telophorus sulfureopectus
- Fiery-breasted bushshrike, Malaconotus cruentus
- Gray-headed bushshrike, Malaconotus blanchoti

== Drongos ==
Order: Passeriformes Family: Dicruridae

The drongos are mostly black or dark grey in colour, sometimes with metallic tints. They have long forked tails, and some Asian species have elaborate tail decorations. They have short legs and sit very upright when perched, like a shrike. They flycatch or take prey from the ground.

- Western square-tailed drongo, Dicrurus occidentalis
- Glossy-backed drongo, Dicrurus divaricatus
- Fanti drongo, Dicrurus atactus

== Monarch flycatchers ==
Order: Passeriformes Family: Monarchidae

The monarch flycatchers are small to medium-sized insectivorous passerines which hunt by flycatching.

- Blue-headed crested-flycatcher, Trochocercus nitens
- African paradise-flycatcher, Terpsiphone viridis

== Shrikes ==
Order: Passeriformes Family: Laniidae

Shrikes are passerine birds known for their habit of catching other birds and small animals and impaling the uneaten portions of their bodies on thorns. A typical shrike's beak is hooked, like a bird of prey.

- Red-backed shrike, Lanius collurio
- Red-tailed shrike, Lanius phoenicuroides
- Isabelline shrike, Lanius isabellinus
- Emin's shrike, Lanius gubernator
- Great gray shrike, Lanius excubitor
- Lesser gray shrike, Lanius minor
- Gray-backed fiscal, Lanius excubitoroides
- Yellow-billed shrike, Lanius corvinus
- Northern fiscal, Lanius humeralis
- Masked shrike, Lanius nubicus
- Woodchat shrike, Lanius senator

== Crows, jays, and magpies ==
Order: Passeriformes Family: Corvidae

The family Corvidae includes crows, ravens, jays, choughs, magpies, treepies, nutcrackers and ground jays. Corvids are above average in size among the Passeriformes, and some of the larger species show high levels of intelligence.

- Piapiac, Ptilostomus afer
- Pied crow, Corvus albus
- Brown-necked raven, Corvus ruficollis
- Fan-tailed raven, Corvus rhipidurus

== Hyliotas ==
Order: Passeriformes Family: Hyliotidae

The members of this small family, all of genus Hyliota, are birds of the forest canopy. They tend to feed in mixed-species flocks.

- Yellow-bellied hyliota, Hyliota flavigaster

== Fairy flycatchers ==
Order: Passeriformes Family: Stenostiridae

Most of the species of this small family are found in Africa, though a few inhabit tropical Asia. They are not closely related to other birds called "flycatchers".

- African blue flycatcher, Elminia longicauda

== Tits, chickadees and titmice ==
Order: Passeriformes Family: Paridae

The Paridae are mainly small stocky woodland species with short stout bills. Some have crests. They are adaptable birds, with a mixed diet including seeds and insects.

- White-shouldered black-tit, Melaniparus guineensis

== Penduline-tits ==
Order: Passeriformes Family: Remizidae

The penduline-tits are a group of small passerine birds related to the true tits. They are insectivores.

- Sennar penduline-tit, Anthoscopus punctifrons
- Yellow penduline-tit, Anthoscopus parvulus

== Larks ==
Order: Passeriformes Family: Alaudidae

Larks are small terrestrial birds with often extravagant songs and display flights. Most larks are fairly dull in appearance. Their food is insects and seeds.

- Greater hoopoe-lark, Alaemon alaudipes
- Rufous-rumped lark, Pinarocorys erythropygia
- Bar-tailed lark, Ammomanes cincturus
- Desert lark, Ammomanes deserti
- Chestnut-backed sparrow-lark, Eremopterix leucotis
- Black-crowned sparrow-lark, Eremopterix nigriceps
- Rufous-naped lark, Mirafra africana
- Flappet lark, Mirafra rufocinnamomea
- Kordofan lark, Mirafra cordofanica
- Horsfield's bushlark, Mirafra javanica
- Rusty lark, Mirafra rufa
- Greater short-toed lark, Calandrella brachydactyla
- Dunn's lark, Eremalauda dunni
- Sun lark, Galerida modesta
- Crested lark, Galerida cristata

== African warblers ==
Order: Passeriformes Family: Macrosphenidae

African warblers are small to medium-sized insectivores which are found in a wide variety of habitats south of the Sahara.

- Northern crombec, Sylvietta brachyura
- Moustached grass-warbler, Melocichla mentalis

== Cisticolas and allies ==
Order: Passeriformes Family: Cisticolidae

The Cisticolidae are warblers found mainly in warmer southern regions of the Old World. They are generally very small birds of drab brown or grey appearance found in open country such as grassland or scrub.

- Yellow-bellied eremomela, Eremomela icteropygialis
- Senegal eremomela, Eremomela pusilla
- Green-backed camaroptera, Camaroptera brachyura
- Cricket longtail, Spiloptila clamans
- Yellow-breasted apalis, Apalis flavida
- Tawny-flanked prinia, Prinia subflava
- River prinia, Prinia fluviatilis
- Red-winged prinia, Prinia erythroptera
- Red-fronted prinia, Prinia rufifrons
- Oriole warbler, Hypergerus atriceps
- Red-faced cisticola, Cisticola erythrops
- Singing cisticola, Cisticola cantans
- Whistling cisticola, Cisticola lateralis
- Rock-loving cisticola, Cisticola aberrans
- Dorst's cisticola, Cisticola guinea
- Winding cisticola, Cisticola marginatus
- Croaking cisticola, Cisticola natalensis
- Siffling cisticola, Cisticola brachypterus
- Rufous cisticola, Cisticola rufus
- Foxy cisticola, Cisticola troglodytes
- Zitting cisticola, Cisticola juncidis
- Desert cisticola, Cisticola aridulus
- Black-necked cisticola, Cisticola eximius

== Reed warblers and allies ==
Order: Passeriformes Family: Acrocephalidae

The members of this family are usually rather large for "warblers". Most are rather plain olivaceous brown above with much yellow to beige below. They are usually found in open woodland, reedbeds, or tall grass. The family occurs mostly in southern to western Eurasia and surroundings, but it also ranges far into the Pacific, with some species in Africa.

- Eastern olivaceous warbler, Iduna pallida
- Western olivaceous warbler, Iduna opaca
- Olive-tree warbler, Hippolais olivetorum
- Melodious warbler, Hippolais polyglotta
- Icterine warbler, Hippolais icterina
- Aquatic warbler, Acrocephalus paludicola
- Sedge warbler, Acrocephalus schoenobaenus
- Common reed warbler, Acrocephalus scirpaceus
- Greater swamp warbler, Acrocephalus rufescens (A)
- Great reed warbler, Acrocephalus arundinaceus

== Grassbirds and allies ==
Order: Passeriformes Family: Locustellidae

Locustellidae are a family of small insectivorous songbirds found mainly in Eurasia, Africa, and the Australian region. They are smallish birds with tails that are usually long and pointed, and tend to be drab brownish or buffy all over.

- Savi's warbler, Locustella luscinioides
- Common grasshopper-warbler, Locustella naevia

== Swallows ==
Order: Passeriformes Family: Hirundinidae

The family Hirundinidae is adapted to aerial feeding. They have a slender streamlined body, long pointed wings and a short bill with a wide gape. The feet are adapted to perching rather than walking, and the front toes are partially joined at the base.

- Plain martin, Riparia paludicola
- Bank swallow, Riparia riparia
- Banded martin, Neophedina cincta
- Eurasian crag-martin, Ptyonoprogne rupestris
- Rock martin, Ptyonoprogne fuligula
- Barn swallow, Hirundo rustica
- Red-chested swallow, Hirundo lucida
- Ethiopian swallow, Hirundo aethiopica
- Wire-tailed swallow, Hirundo smithii
- Pied-winged swallow, Hirundo leucosoma
- Red-rumped swallow, Cecropis daurica
- Lesser striped-swallow, Cecropis abyssinica
- Rufous-chested swallow, Cecropis semirufa
- Mosque swallow, Cecropis senegalensis
- Preuss's swallow, Petrochelidon preussi
- Common house-martin, Delichon urbicum
- Fanti sawwing, Psalidoprocne obscura
- Gray-rumped swallow, Pseudhirundo griseopyga

== Bulbuls ==
Order: Passeriformes Family: Pycnonotidae

Bulbuls are medium-sized songbirds. Some are colourful with yellow, red or orange vents, cheeks, throats or supercilia, but most are drab, with uniform olive-brown to black plumage. Some species have distinct crests.

- Simple greenbul, Chlorocichla simplex
- Yellow-throated greenbul, Atimastillas flavicollis
- Leaf-love, Phyllastrephus scandens
- Common bulbul, Pycnonotus barbatus

== Leaf warblers ==
Order: Passeriformes Family: Phylloscopidae

Leaf warblers are a family of small insectivorous birds found mostly in Eurasia and ranging into Wallacea and Africa. The species are of various sizes, often green-plumaged above and yellow below, or more subdued with greyish-green to greyish-brown colours.

- Wood warbler, Phylloscopus sibilatrix
- Western Bonelli's warbler, Phylloscopus bonelli
- Willow warbler, Phylloscopus trochilus
- Common chiffchaff, Phylloscopus collybita
- Iberian chiffchaff, Phylloscopus ibericus (A)

== Sylviid warblers, parrotbills, and allies ==
Order: Passeriformes Family: Sylviidae

The family Sylviidae is a group of small insectivorous passerine birds. They mainly occur as breeding species, as the common name implies, in Europe, Asia and, to a lesser extent, Africa. Most are of generally undistinguished appearance, but many have distinctive songs.

- Eurasian blackcap, Sylvia atricapilla
- Garden warbler, Sylvia borin
- Lesser whitethroat, Curruca curruca
- Western Orphean warbler, Curruca hortensis
- African desert warbler, Curruca deserti
- Rüppell's warbler, Curruca ruppeli (A)
- Sardinian warbler, Curruca melanocephala (A)
- Moltoni's warbler, Curruca subalpina
- Western subalpine warbler, Curruca iberiae
- Eastern subalpine warbler, Curruca cantillans
- Greater whitethroat, Curruca communis
- Spectacled warbler, Curruca conspicillata (A)

== White-eyes, yuhinas, and Allies ==
Order: Passeriformes Family: Zosteropidae

The white-eyes are small and mostly undistinguished, their plumage above being generally some dull colour like greenish-olive, but some species have a white or bright yellow throat, breast or lower parts, and several have buff flanks. As their name suggests, many species have a white ring around each eye.

- Northern yellow white-eye, Zosterops senegalensis

== Laughingthrushes and allies ==
Order: Passeriformes Family: Leiothrichidae

The members of this family are diverse in size and colouration, though those of genus Turdoides tend to be brown or greyish. The family is found in Africa, India, and southeast Asia.

- Fulvous chatterer, Argya fulva
- Brown babbler, Turdoides plebejus
- Blackcap babbler, Turdoides reinwardtii

== Treecreepers ==
Order: Passeriformes Family: Certhiidae

Treecreepers are small woodland birds, brown above and white below. They have thin pointed down-curved bills, which they use to extricate insects from bark. They have stiff tail feathers, like woodpeckers, which they use to support themselves on vertical trees.

- African spotted creeper, Salpornis salvadori

== Oxpeckers ==
Order: Passeriformes Family: Buphagidae

As both the English and scientific names of these birds imply, they feed on ectoparasites, primarily ticks, found on large mammals.

- Yellow-billed oxpecker, Buphagus africanus

== Starlings ==
Order: Passeriformes Family: Sturnidae

Starlings are small to medium-sized passerine birds. Their flight is strong and direct and they are very gregarious. Their preferred habitat is fairly open country. They eat insects and fruit. Plumage is typically dark with a metallic sheen.

- Violet-backed starling, Cinnyricinclus leucogaster
- Neumann's starling, Onychognathus neumanni
- Long-tailed glossy-starling, Lamprotornis caudatus
- Chestnut-bellied starling, Lamprotornis pulcher
- Lesser blue-eared starling, Lamprotornis chloropterus
- Greater blue-eared starling, Lamprotornis chalybaeus
- Purple starling, Lamprotornis purpureus
- Bronze-tailed starling, Lamprotornis chalcurus

== Thrushes and allies ==
Order: Passeriformes Family: Turdidae

The thrushes are a group of passerine birds that occur mainly in the Old World. They are plump, soft plumaged, small to medium-sized insectivores or sometimes omnivores, often feeding on the ground. Many have attractive songs.

- Song thrush, Turdus philomelos
- African thrush, Turdus pelios

== Old World flycatchers ==
Order: Passeriformes Family: Muscicapidae

Old World flycatchers are a large group of small passerine birds native to the Old World. They are mainly small arboreal insectivores. The appearance of these birds is highly varied, but they mostly have weak songs and harsh calls.

- Spotted flycatcher, Muscicapa striata
- Gambaga flycatcher, Muscicapa gambagae
- Swamp flycatcher, Muscicapa aquatica
- Cassin's flycatcher, Muscicapa cassini
- Pale flycatcher, Agricola pallidus
- Gray tit-flycatcher, Fraseria plumbea
- Northern black-flycatcher, Melaenornis edolioides
- Black scrub-robin, Cercotrichas podobe
- Rufous-tailed scrub-robin, Cercotrichas galactotes
- Snowy-crowned robin-chat, Cossypha niveicapilla
- White-crowned robin-chat, Cossypha albicapilla
- Common nightingale, Luscinia megarhynchos
- Bluethroat, Luscinia svecica
- European pied flycatcher, Ficedula hypoleuca
- Collared flycatcher, Ficedula albicollis
- Common redstart, Phoenicurus phoenicurus
- Black redstart, Phoenicurus ochruros
- Rufous-tailed rock-thrush, Monticola saxatilis
- Blue rock-thrush, Monticola solitarius (A)
- Whinchat, Saxicola rubetra
- African stonechat, Saxicola torquatus
- Mocking cliff-chat, Thamnolaea cinnamomeiventris
- Northern anteater-chat, Myrmecocichla aethiops
- Northern wheatear, Oenanthe oenanthe
- Atlas wheatear, Oenanthe seebohmi
- Isabelline wheatear, Oenanthe isabellina
- Heuglin's wheatear, Oenanthe heuglini
- Desert wheatear, Oenanthe deserti
- Western black-eared wheatear, Oenanthe hispanica (A)
- Eastern black-eared wheatear, Oenanthe melanoleuca
- White-fronted black-chat, Oenanthe albifrons
- Blackstart, Oenanthe melanura
- Familiar chat, Oenanthe familiaris
- White-crowned wheatear, Oenanthe leucopyga

== Sunbirds and spiderhunters ==
Order: Passeriformes Family: Nectariniidae

The sunbirds and spiderhunters are very small passerine birds which feed largely on nectar, although they will also take insects, especially when feeding young. Flight is fast and direct on their short wings. Most species can take nectar by hovering like a hummingbird, but usually perch to feed.

- Mouse-brown sunbird, Anthreptes gabonicus
- Western violet-backed sunbird, Anthreptes longuemarei
- Collared sunbird, Hedydipna collaris
- Pygmy sunbird, Hedydipna platura
- Green-headed sunbird, Cyanomitra verticalis
- Scarlet-chested sunbird, Chalcomitra senegalensis
- Beautiful sunbird, Cinnyris pulchellus
- Splendid sunbird, Cinnyris coccinigaster
- Variable sunbird, Cinnyris venustus
- Copper sunbird, Cinnyris cupreus

== Weavers and allies ==
Order: Passeriformes Family: Ploceidae

The weavers are small passerine birds related to the finches. They are seed-eating birds with rounded conical bills. The males of many species are brightly coloured, usually in red or yellow and black, some species show variation in colour only in the breeding season.

- White-billed buffalo-weaver, Bubalornis albirostris
- Speckle-fronted weaver, Sporopipes frontalis
- Chestnut-crowned sparrow-weaver, Plocepasser superciliosus
- Red-headed weaver, Anaplectes rubriceps
- Little weaver, Ploceus luteolus
- Olive-naped weaver, Ploceus brachypterus
- Vitelline masked-weaver, Ploceus vitellinus
- Heuglin's masked-weaver, Ploceus heuglini
- Village weaver, Ploceus cucullatus
- Black-headed weaver, Ploceus melanocephalus
- Red-headed quelea, Quelea erythrops
- Red-billed quelea, Quelea quelea
- Northern red bishop, Euplectes franciscanus
- Black-winged bishop, Euplectes hordeaceus
- Yellow-crowned bishop, Euplectes afer
- Yellow-mantled widowbird, Euplectes macroura (A)
- Red-collared widowbird, Euplectes ardens
- Fan-tailed widowbird, Euplectes axillaris

== Waxbills and allies ==
Order: Passeriformes Family: Estrildidae

The estrildid finches are small passerine birds of the Old World tropics and Australasia. They are gregarious and often colonial seed eaters with short thick but pointed bills. They are all similar in structure and habits, but have wide variation in plumage colours and patterns.

- Bronze mannikin, Spermestes cucullatus
- Magpie mannikin, Spermestes fringilloides
- African silverbill, Euodice cantans
- Gray-headed oliveback, Delacourella capistrata
- Lavender waxbill, Glaucestrilda caerulescens
- Orange-cheeked waxbill, Estrilda melpoda
- Common waxbill, Estrilda astrild
- Black-rumped waxbill, Estrilda troglodytes
- Quailfinch, Ortygospiza atricollis
- Cut-throat, Amadina fasciata
- Zebra waxbill, Amandava subflava
- Red-cheeked cordonbleu, Uraeginthus bengalus
- Green-winged pytilia, Pytilia melba
- Red-winged pytilia, Pytilia phoenicoptera
- Dybowski's twinspot, Euschistospiza dybowskii
- Red-billed firefinch, Lagonosticta senegala
- African firefinch, Lagonosticta rubricata (A)
- Jameson's firefinch, Lagonosticta rhodopareia
- Mali firefinch, Lagonosticta virata (E)
- Black-bellied firefinch, Lagonosticta rara
- Bar-breasted firefinch, Lagonosticta rufopicta
- Black-faced firefinch, Lagonosticta larvata

== Indigobirds ==
Order: Passeriformes Family: Viduidae

The indigobirds are finch-like species which usually have black or indigo predominating in their plumage. All are brood parasites, which lay their eggs in the nests of estrildid finches.

- Pin-tailed whydah, Vidua macroura
- Sahel paradise-whydah, Vidua orientalis
- Exclamatory paradise-whydah, Vidua interjecta
- Togo paradise-whydah, Vidua togoensis
- Village indigobird, Vidua chalybeata
- Quailfinch indigobird, Vidua nigeriae
- Baka indigobird, Vidua larvaticola
- Cameroon indigobird, Vidua camerunensis
- Variable indigobird, Vidua funerea
- Pale-winged indigobird, Vidua wilsoni
- Parasitic weaver, Anomalospiza imberbis (A)

== Old World sparrows ==
Order: Passeriformes Family: Passeridae

Old World sparrows are small passerine birds. In general, sparrows tend to be small, plump, brown or grey birds with short tails and short powerful beaks. Sparrows are seed eaters, but they also consume small insects.

- House sparrow, Passer domesticus
- Northern gray-headed sparrow, Passer griseus
- Desert sparrow, Passer simplex
- Sudan golden sparrow, Passer luteus
- Yellow-spotted bush sparrow, Gymnoris pyrgita
- Sahel bush sparrow, Gymnoris dentata

== Wagtails and pipits ==
Order: Passeriformes Family: Motacillidae

Motacillidae is a family of small passerine birds with medium to long tails. They include the wagtails, longclaws and pipits. They are slender, ground feeding insectivores of open country.

- Gray wagtail, Motacilla cinerea
- Western yellow wagtail, Motacilla flava
- African pied wagtail, Motacilla aguimp
- White wagtail, Motacilla alba
- Richard's pipit, Anthus richardi
- Long-billed pipit, Anthus similis
- Tawny pipit, Anthus campestris
- Plain-backed pipit, Anthus leucophrys
- Tree pipit, Anthus trivialis
- Red-throated pipit, Anthus cervinus
- Yellow-throated longclaw, Macronyx croceus

== Finches, euphonias, and allies ==
Order: Passeriformes Family: Fringillidae

Finches are seed-eating passerine birds, that are small to moderately large and have a strong beak, usually conical and in some species very large. All have twelve tail feathers and nine primaries. These birds have a bouncing flight with alternating bouts of flapping and gliding on closed wings, and most sing well.

- Trumpeter finch, Bucanetes githaginea
- White-rumped seedeater, Crithagra leucopygius
- Yellow-fronted canary, Crithagra mozambicus
- West African seedeater, Crithagra canicapilla
- Streaky-headed seedeater, Crithagra gularis

== Old World buntings ==
Order: Passeriformes Family: Emberizidae

The emberizids are a large family of passerine birds. They are seed-eating birds with distinctively shaped bills. Many emberizid species have distinctive head patterns.

- Brown-rumped bunting, Emberiza affinis
- Ortolan bunting, Emberiza hortulana
- Cabanis's bunting, Emberiza cabanisi (A)
- Golden-breasted bunting, Emberiza flaviventris
- Gosling's bunting, Emberiza goslingi
- House bunting, Emberiza sahari
- Striolated bunting, Emberiza striolata

== See also ==
- List of birds
- Lists of birds by region
