= Sotelma =

Malian telecommunications company

Société des télécommunications au Mali
- Trade name: Sotelma
- Industry: Telecommunications
- Headquarters: Bamako, Mali
- Owner: Maroc Telecom (51%)

Sotelma is a private telecommunications company in Mali. The company is based in Bamako. Sotelma provides local telephony, international telephony, internet service and mobile telephone service, etc. Its mobile service subsidiary is Malitel. It is also the official registry of the .ml country code domain.

The full name of the company in the French language is Société des télécommunications au Mali.

In 2008, it was announced the government of Mali would privatise Sotelma to an unnamed private party. The company would be divided with 51% going to a single private investor, 20% retained by the government, 10% going to employees, and 19% sold by public offer. Privatization was finalized in 2010.

On 13 July 2009, 51% of Sotelma's shares were acquired by Maroc Telecom.

As of 2002, Sotelma had a total worth of 43,817 billion CFA francs, over 1300 staff, operated 1100 km of fibre optic transmission line, 9 DOMSAT relay stations, 19 VSAT stations, 110000 telephone subscriber lines and 5241 public phones.
