= Water supply and sanitation in Mali =

Water supply and sanitation in Mali are characterized by several challenges. Mali is a low-income country in north-west Africa: As of 2025, it ranks 188 on the United Nations Human Development Index (out of 193 countries). The country's rapid growth in population in recent years, combined with limited infrastructure, has contributed to the restricted access of clean water and proper sanitation. Initiatives by the government, USAID and other international organizations have improved access to safe drinking water. Inequalities between rural and urban areas continue to persist: Only about 68% of the rural population in Mali has access to basic drinking water service, while 27% of the rural population is using unprotected water resources for drinking water or household use. Unclean water increases the risk of waterborne diseases that can be potentially fatal. These can include parasitic infections or diarrheal diseases such as cholera, typhoid, and dysentery. Main surface waters are the Niger and Senegal rivers and their tributaries. Irregular rainfall and a decrease in rainfall affect the availability of water resources. Water availability is also critical for food security in Mali. Mali's progress in expanding water and sanitation infrastructure relies on many factors, such as policy change and increased community education, and the resources to implement the infrastructure depend heavily on external funding and national policy.

== Economy ==
The current status of water supply and sanitation in Mali is shaped by the country's history and economy. Mali gained independence in 1960. A large percentage its population is in the informal sector, and as of 2023, 33% of its GDP comes from the informal sector. It has a rapidly growing population: The total population quadrupled from 5 million in 1960 to more than 21 million in 2022. Mali faced a multi-decade drought from the late 1960s until the 1980s. This crisis diverted policy attention to emergency water provisionç It was not until the mid-1980s that the first structured water supply project was launched in rural regions by an external investor.

Mali faces financial constraints in infrastructure development: Political instability and economic weakness after 2012 have hindered development. Mali is highly vulnerable to the impacts of climate change, including desertification, drought, locust invasions, and floods. COVID-19 and the health, security, social, and political crises of 2020 has led to increase in expenditures and growth in poverty rates. Thus, Mali has relied on external funding to expand infrastructure for water supply and sanitation: USAID has supported agricultural development projects in Mali since 1961, and complemented its development projects in the South of the country with rural water and sanitation services. The International Development Association and the World Bank have financed several multi-year projects in Mali, including prevention of river blindness, drought relief, rural development, debt relief and water infrastructure and infrastructure rehabilitation projects.

== Weather and Climate Change ==
Climate classification, Mali

Mali's water supply and sanitation are increasingly impacted by climate change. Rising temperatures, more frequent droughts, erratic rainfall and decreased groundwater recharge reduce the amount of surface water and groundwater available in the country. Mali greatly relies on wells and aquifers to supply its water. The reduction of water availability directly impacts both drinking water, agricultural activities and food security. Moreover, climate-induced instability of water can exacerbate resource competition, especially in rural areas, contributing to social tensions and livelihood insecurity.

== Sector Overview ==
=== Sustainable Development Goal 6 ===
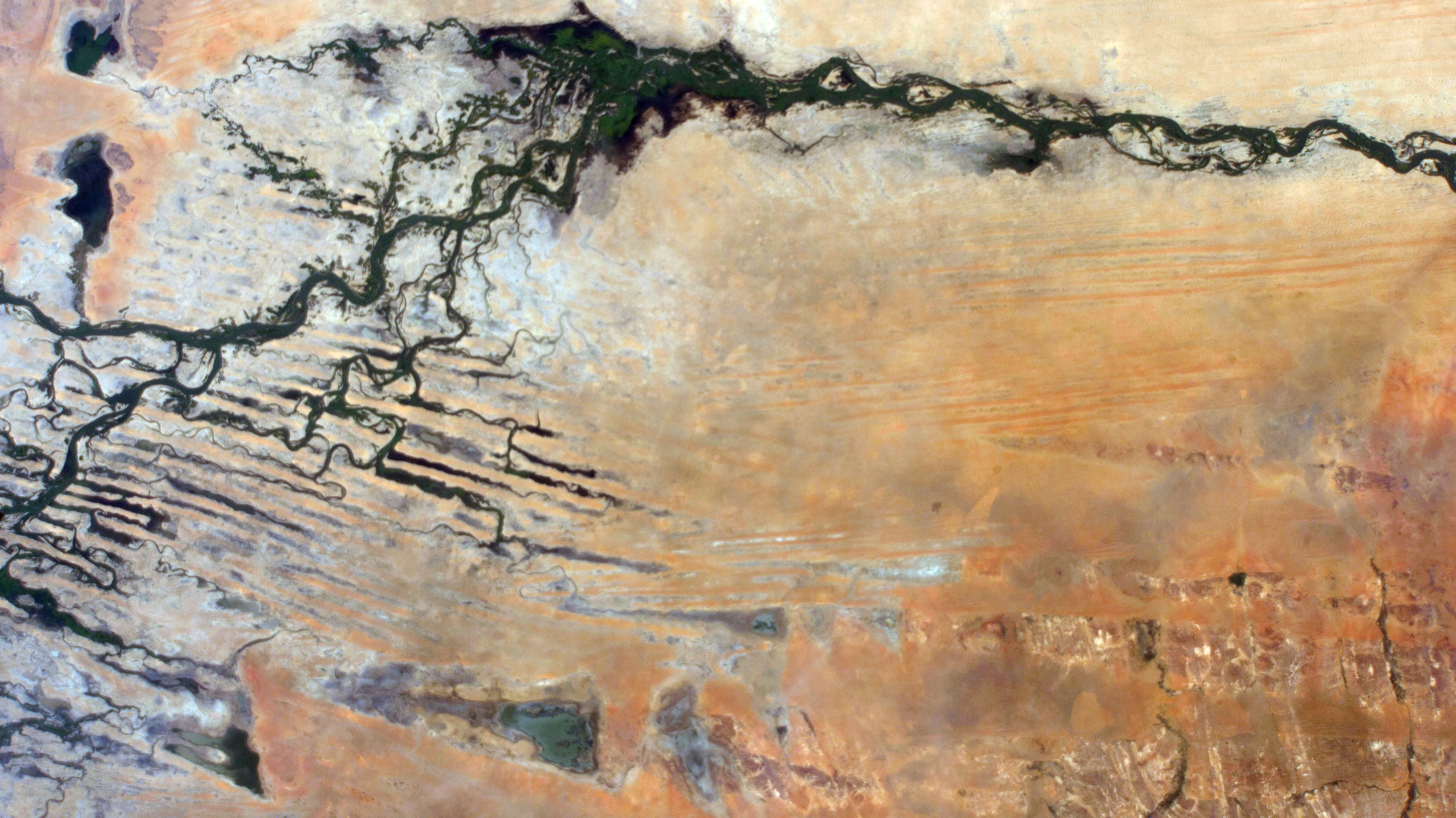
Niger river in Mali

The Sustainable Development Goals include SDG 6, which the United Nations describes as ensuring the availability and sustainable management of water and sanitation for all by 2030. In terms of progress with SDG 6, the population using at least basic drinking services has improved. However, population using at least basic sanitation services has stagnated.

=== Technical Infrastructure ===
Wells serve as the primary source of water for many communities in Mali. The cost of wells and pumps, along with their maintenance, is often very high and therefore leads to poor hygiene practices. The wells are commonly hand dug, which often leads to increased levels of erosion causing contamination of the water from sediment and debris. There is also a risk for stagnant water which provides a breeding ground for bacteria and mosquitos which create the issue of a breeding ground for malaria. In addition, the wells are typically left uncovered and untreated, as treatment is regarded as too expensive or inaccessible. This introduces risks to human health issues, particularly through waterborne diseases.

=== Water Pricing ===
Water pricing is a sensitive subject: In Kayes, Mali, a survey in early 2000s found households paid on average 23% of their monthly income for water. The price of water per 1,000 liter ranged in their samples from $1.50 USD to $2 USD, a high price in relation to the average local income. Furthermore, retail water sales is a major source of water for poor communities that are not connected to mains. Well water is sold, and the prices vary by the distance from the well.

=== Water Quality at Public Institutions ===
Water sanitation and quality are also problems at hospitals in Mali. At hospitals, women who are about to deliver are at great risk of complications due to the health centers' inability to prevent many infections. They often have to relieve themselves outside because public restrooms are not available. Only 20% of health facilities in Mali were reported to have clean water. The same situation arises when it comes to Malian schools. Only 57% of schools provide some sort of sanitation facility, an even smaller percentage of that provides students with separate gender restrooms. To counter this, an organization called the BECEYA intervention worked to improve water supply, latrine, and hygiene infrastructure in health centers in Mali. According to staff and users of the facilities, better WASH in health facilities improved the quality of care, reduced infection risk, and also created an overall healthier environment for both patients and the staff, as well as the community. Although in 2022, healthcare-associated infections in Mali caused by inadequate WASH cost an estimated $73 million USD, which was about 0.4% of the country's GDP. These infections also caused about 5,300 excess deaths that year, highlighting the direct impact of little to low institutional water or sanitation effected the health systems.

== Lack of access to water ==
=== Agriculture ===
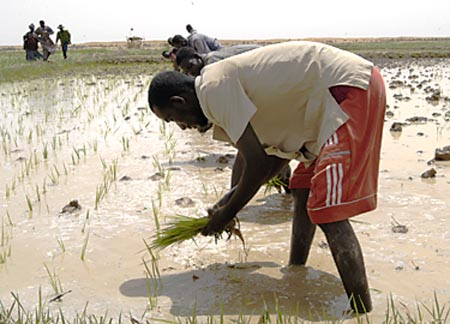
Rice farmers in Mali

Agriculture is the number one economic industry in Mali. Mali has been deemed the 'food basket' of the West African region. More than 200,000 hectare (2000 km^2) of land is currently leased to use for growing highly water-demanding crops such as rice and sugar cane, which creates a pressing need to improve water management system. Many local Malians are poor subsistence farmers, heavily reliant on natural resources and are vulnerable to environmental issues and lack of accessible water. Poor water management has led to wasteful and inefficient water use, which leads to problems such as degradation of infrastructure, environmental damage, and water accessibility issues for others. Due to increased urbanization and industrial growth, as well as reduced rain fall due to climate change, the inadequacy and limits of water access have been highly. Office du Niger (ON) was created to manage and develop the land and water sources in the area. The ON does not directly handle environmental protection but may intervene if water management systems are affected by environmental problems.

Agriculture in Mali is mostly dominated by rain-fed farming, which makes farmers very vulnerable to a lack of water and very dependent on the climate. Most of Mali's arable land relies on rainfall, not irrigation, which reduces the crop's productivity as a whole. There is a large irrigation potential in Mali, but only a fraction of the approximately 566,000 ha eligible area is currently irrigated using a pump, gravity-based, or even manual watering system. Many small farms depend on simple pump, rope, and bucket techniques because they lack access to newer, more efficient technology. Furthermore, water insecurity in farming is also thanks to climate change and droughts. Droughts in rural Mali have the ability to severely limit both the water availability for crops and access to drinking water for people. In particular, water availability in parts of Mali is often based on seasonal variability. This means in dry seasons or in regions far from major rivers, water is scarce for both crops and the people growing them. This variability results in economic water scarcity. Despite having substantial water resources at a national level in Mali, the unequal distribution of that water and weak water management restricts many farmers' access and crops, and are often unsuccessful.

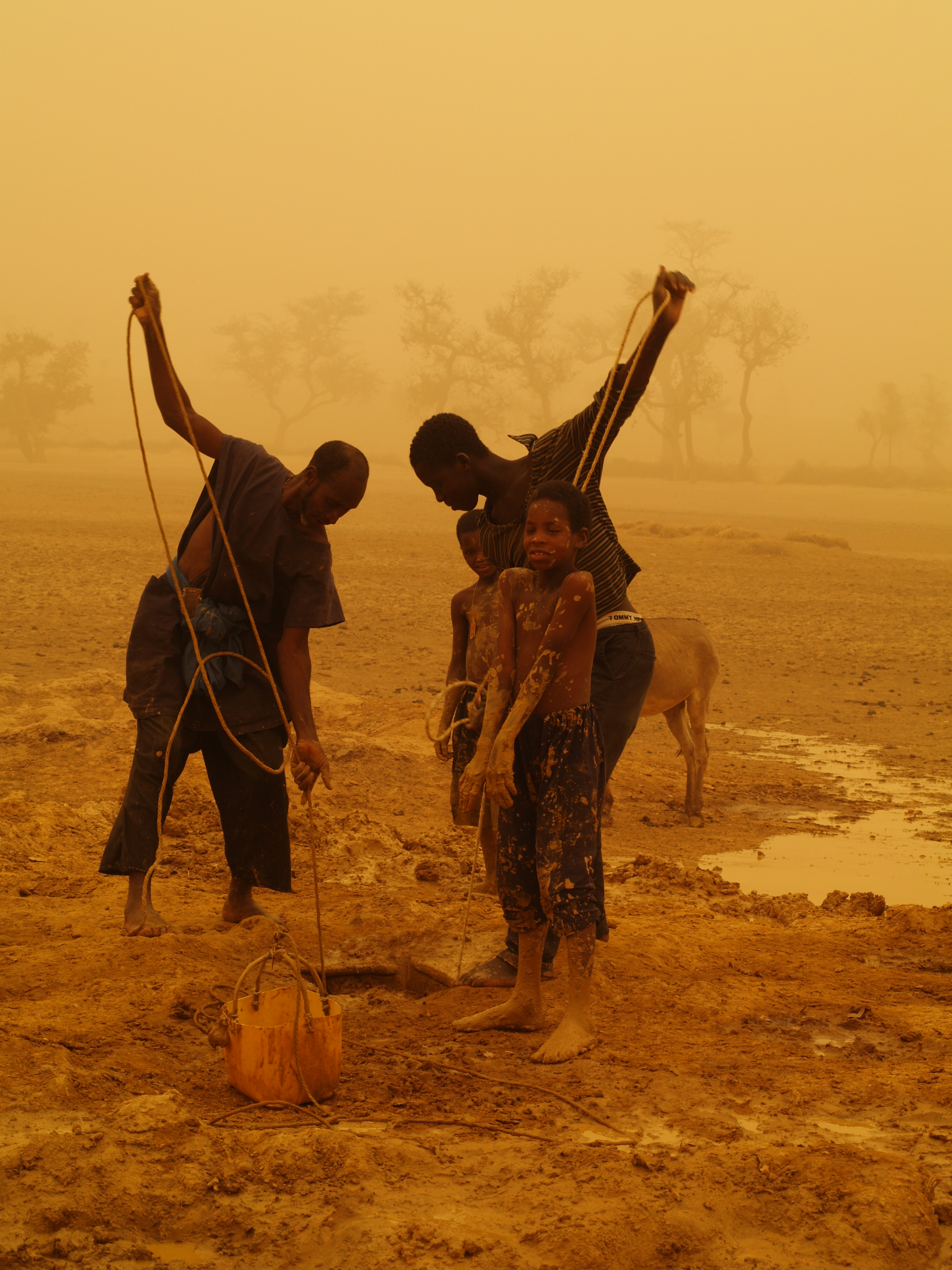
Withdrawing water for irrigation in Dogon Plateau, Mali

=== Small-Scale Irrigation ===
With such poor distribution of water nationwide in Mali, farmers are unable to grow consistent and successful crops to feed their communities. Small-scale irrigation has been seen as a solution to this issue. A demand for irrigation water for Malian farmers is likely unreasonable and outstrips supply, so many communities want new micro-dams or reservoirs, yet the capacity to build and maintain them would be expensive and limited. Solar-powered pumps have also been promoted, but looking to build a sustainable and affordable market for these pumps among farmers has been difficult and has halted progress. Small-scale irrigation has been identified as a solution, but with so many barriers, like lack of credit, weak local market systems for irrigation equipment, and limited technical capacity among farmers, it is not a holistic one.

== Health ==
=== WASH ===
WASH refers to water, sanitation, and hygiene and is a program that operated world wide aiming to improve water avaibalblity, sanitation and hygiene practices. According to best estimates by the United Nations Children's Fund, in Mali, only 51% of schools in low-income settings have access to water, and 45% have adequate sanitation facilities. Additionally, less than 20% of schools have a functional separate latrine for boys and girls. Yet, around 80% of Malians reported having access to improved drinking water sources, but when in rural areas, this number falls to around 70%. WASH programs are implemented in Mali to improve these numbers and increase access to clean water. Organizations such as UNICEF, World Vision, and CARE partner with and fund WASH to increase the scope of their impact.

=== Waterborne Disease ===
Waterborne diseases are spread through ingesting or coming in contact with contaminated water. Improper water sanitation drastically increases the risk of disease becoming leading threat to human health in places like Mali that lack sanitation resources. Diseases such as cholera, typhoid, and dysentery are commonly spread through water and all have symptoms such vomiting, stomach pain, muscle cramps, and extreme diarrhea. The inadequate access to clean water and proper sanitation in Mali additionally introduces the risk of waterborne parasitic infections. Cryptosporidium and Giardia are two common parasites spread through water in Mali and other parts of the world. Ingesting these parasites lead to similar symptoms including diarrhea, stomach pain, and vomiting.

Diseases and parasitic infections such as these can be deadly without the proper treatment. The severe diarrhea caused by many of the common waterborne diseases can cause severe malnourishment and dehydration leading to weight loss and potential death if left untreated. Mali lacks adequate resources and infrastructure to treat people who present with these symptoms. They also experience high levels of poverty causing people to be unable the limited medical recourses they do have. This leaves people vulnerable to the effects of these symptoms and unable to access treatment. Because of this waterborne diseases are one of the leading causes of death in Mali.

Children are particularly susceptible to disease and vulnerable to their symptoms. Childhood diarrhea is a primary cause of death in the children population of Mali. Many studies have been conducted in order to reduce this problem, but the number of children dying from waterborne diseases in Mali has risen. Diarrhea is cited as the second leading cause of childhood morbidity and mortality globally, contributing to 90% of deaths in children under 5 years old in countries of low to middle income. Increases in childhood diarrhea are connected closely to water, sanitation, and hygiene, often abbreviated to "WASH". Access to improved water and sanitation has shown a significant association with the reduction of diarrheal diseases overall.

=== Contamination of Domestic Wells ===
Contamination of wells and pit latrines in rural areas of Mali is a common challenge to improving sanitation and the quality of the water. In 2017, a survey was done on domestic wells accessing groundwater and pit latrines in a rural village in southern Mali. The results of this showed that there was fecal contamination in the wells and that the contamination significantly correlated with latrine density and proximity. Population density, well density, and latrine density were all statistical predictors of contamination risk. Many homes do try to treat their water from the wells using things like bleach, yet, their treatment practices are often ineffective and do not rid the contamination.

=== Open Defecation ===
Open defecation is a common occurrence in Mali particularly in rural areas. More than 1 million people in Mali still practice open defecation because of the lack of proper sanitation facilities. Over half of the rural population does not have access to proper water sanitation practices making this a contamination issue. Diseases are spread by the fecal matter contaminating water sources, particularly groundwater. Contaminated water is unknowingly consumed and used for daily tasks worsening the spread of waterborne diseases.

== Campaigns and Interventions ==
=== Increased Hand Washing ===
In facilities in Burkina Faso and Mali, it has been shown that poor hand hygiene in health care facilities, often do to the lack of WASH infrastructure, has been shown to increase disease. When hand hygiene increased, there was a drastic decrease in nosocomial infection risks in health care facilities in Mali. To increase hand hygiene in these health care facilities in Mali, better WASH infrastructure was needed. The better WASH infrastructure led to greater infection prevention and control overall in Mali.

=== Improved Hygiene ===
Studies have shown that improved hygiene has been effective in decreasing the mortality rate, which, in some cases, is as high as 45%. These studies showed that improved hygiene was twice as effective at reducing waterborne diseases as improved drinking sources, which were unsuccessful due to re-contamination. Re-contamination, in these cases, often occurred in households. Due to improper water handling and storage. Inadequate water, sanitation, and hygiene (WASH) programs have been implemented to improve access to clean water as well as improve hygiene techniques to decrease contamination of water. Improvements to WASH at schools have been shown to reduce diarrheal disease, acute respiratory infections, soil-transmitted infections, and absence among pupils, though results are not consistent between studies. This is due to a number of factors: weak program design, poor program fidelity, limited adherence, weak evaluation of results, as well as pupil-reported outcomes. For example, in Mali, more than a quarter of schools have reported dumping their waste on the premises, contributing to poor sanitation, and nearly 1 in 10 schools in Mali don't even have a system or the infrastructure for managing their waste at all.

== Gender Equality ==
There is a growing recognition that access to water, sanitation, and hygiene in places like Mali has a very strong connection to gender equality. Women and girls, who typically carry the responsibility for both the collection of the water and household hygiene, as well as caregiving, which puts a disproportionate burden when the water supply is inaccessible, and sanitation facilities are lacking. Persistent gender norms around water can also often limit women's opportunities because of the time spent fetching water or queuing at wells. This reduced their time for education or economic activity. Through lack of safe, private sanitation facilities, women's dignity is often compromised as well as their safety because menstrual hygiene management is not a priority. Even more so, women are excluded constantly from decisions regarding WASH infrastructure, even though it is such an important part of their lives. Integrating gender-responsive WASH is therefore essential in places such a Mali. This means ensuring WASH infrastructure meets women's needs through female-friendly toilets, privacy and safe access, as well as involving women in planning and the governance of WASH and supporting their leadership.
