= Merchant Express Aviation =

Nigerian airline

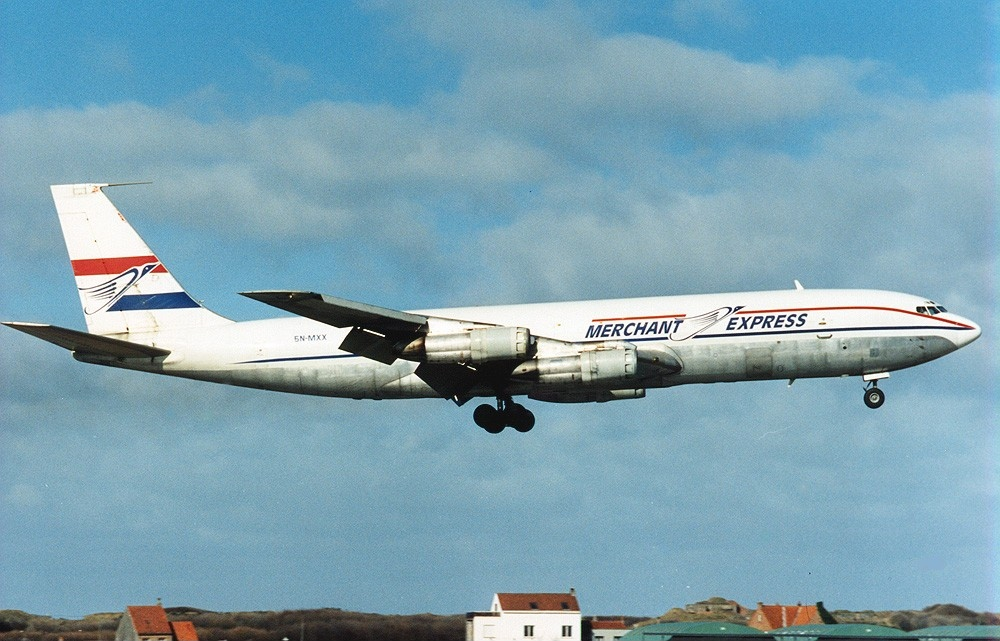
- Boeing 707-323C, Merchant Express
IATA	ICAO	Call sign
-	MXX	Merchant
- Fleet size: one Boeing 707
- Headquarters: Lagos, Nigeria

Merchant Express Aviation was a cargo airline flying out of Lagos, Nigeria.

== Fleet ==
Merchant Express Aviation used only one aircraft, a Boeing 707 that flew regularly from Africa to European cities, such as Ostend, Belgium. The aircraft's registration was 5N-MXX.

== History ==
Merchant Express Aviation flew around the 1990s. Just like many other cargo airlines from around the world, the company gave the venerable 707 jet another chance to fly for a company (other cargo airlines use the DC-8 also). Competition from such European cargo airlines like Cargo Lion, Cargolux and Germany's DHL, combined with the poor economic situation of Nigeria during the time (which also had to do with Nigeria Airways' demise) to precipitate the cargo airline company's demise before the 2000s had arrived.

== Code data ==
- ICAO Code: MXX
- Callsign: MERCHANT

== Destinations ==
From Lagos to many European cities.
