= Malitel =

Malian telecommunications company

Logo

Malitel is a mobile telephone service provider in Mali. It is a subsidiary of Sotelma, the national telecommunications company. Malitel's service is supported by Siemens AG.
