= .ml =

Internet country-code top level domain for Mali

- Introduced: 29 September 1993
- TLD type: Country code top-level domain
- Status: Active
- Registry: Agence des Technologies de l'Information et de la Communication
- Sponsor: Agence des Technologies de l'Information et de la Communication
- Intended use: Entities connected with Mali
- Actual use: Sees some use in Mali and for some websites about machine learning. Use is relatively rare elsewhere.
- Structure: Registrations are at third level beneath various second-level names
- Dispute policies: UDRP
- Registry website: point.ml

.ml is the Internet country code top-level domain (ccTLD) for Mali.

== History ==
The domain was initially managed by Sotelma, a Malian telecommunications company. After Sotelma was privatised in 2009, the .ml zone was redelegated by IANA to the Agence des Technologies de l'Information et de la Communication (AGETIC), a Malian government agency, and the process completed in 2013. The agency then announced that it would give away .ml domains for free in partnership with Freenom with a view to improve the usage and the knowledge of the IT industry in Mali. It was the first African nation to start giving away domains for free. The ten-year contract with Freenom expired on 17 July 2023. Since then the registry is operated by AGETIC itself and the free domain offer was discontinued. All paid Freenom .ml domains were migrated to the new system.

== Second-level domains ==
Registrations are possible at the second level and at the third level beneath these names:

- .com.ml: Companies
- .net.ml: Internet providers
- .org.ml: Associations (must show registration); international organizations permitted, but must be registered with the local administration
- .edu.ml: Local schools
- .presse.ml: Local press
- .gov.ml: Governmental organisations

Domain names of between one and three characters are considered premium domain names with a higher price.

== Military emails ==
Employees for the United States Armed Forces regularly misspell emails—suffixed with the .mil TLD—with .ml. In 2013, Dutch internet entrepreneur Johannes Zuurbier took on the .ml TLD. He attempted to contact the United States government about classified information being sent to army.ml and navy.ml in 2014 through Dutch diplomats. The contents of these emails include crew and staff lists, maps and photos of installations, naval inspection reports, and passwords. Emails that were sent to the .ml TLD include the travel itinerary of chief of staff James McConville on a trip to Indonesia in 2023, information about Kurdistan Workers' Party efforts in the United States, and Australian Department of Defence documents detailing issues with Australian F-35s. On 17 July 2023, Zuurbier's contract expired and control was reverted to the Malian government.
