= Maxair (airline) =

Swedish airline

IATA	ICAO	Call sign
8M	MXL	MAXAIR
- Commenced operations: 1996
- Ceased operations: 2005
- Headquarters: Malmö, Sweden

Maxair was an airline based at Malmö in Sweden. It was formed as an air-taxi operation in 1996, and started scheduled operations in September 1998. It operated two Fairchild Metroliners and two Jetstream 32s. The airline ceased operations in 2005.

== See also ==
- Airlines
- Transport in Sweden
