= Mali Air Express =

| IATA | ICAO | Call sign |
|---|---|---|
| - | VXP | — |
- Founded: 2005
- Ceased operations: 2020
- Hubs: Senou International Airport
- Fleet size: 2
- Headquarters: Bamako, Mali

Mali Air Express was an airline based in Bamako, Mali. Its main base was Senou International Airport. It was established in 2001, but started operations in 2005. The airline mainly operated regular services to destinations in Mali, but also offered other destinations in Dakar, Senegal. It also operates services to other Western African capitals.

== Former fleet ==
The Mali Air Express fleet included the following aircraft (at April 2019):

Mali Air Express fleet
| Aircraft | In fleet | Orders | Notes |
|---|---|---|---|
| Saab 340A | 2 | 0 | |

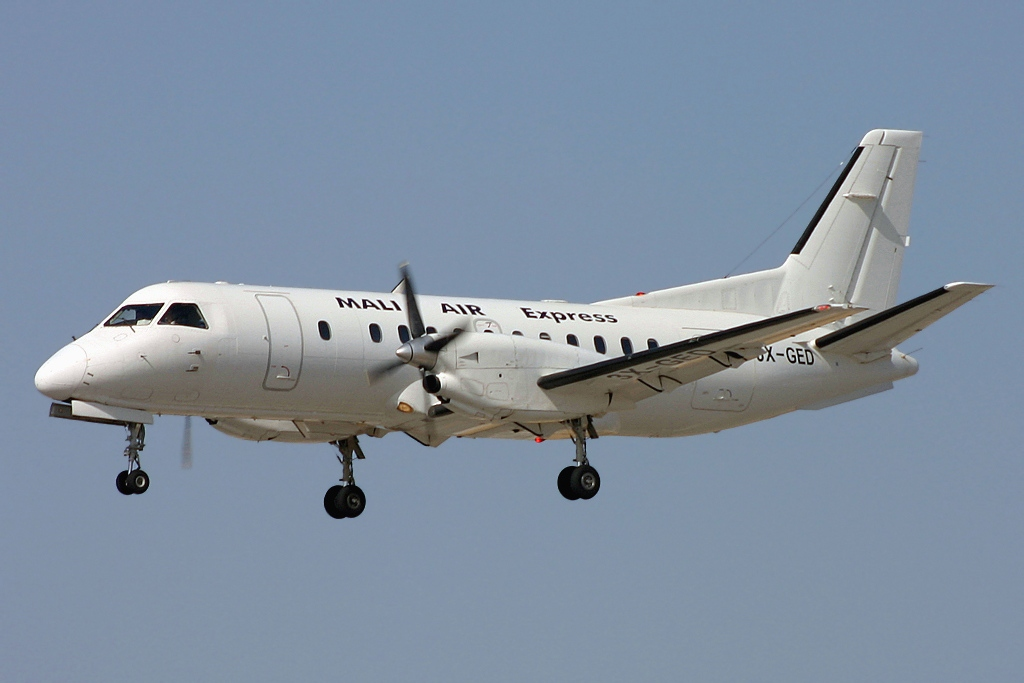
Mali Air Express Saab340A at Faro Airport
