= Mali Airways =

IATA	ICAO	Call sign
Z8	MTZ	MALI AIRWAYS
- Founded: 2015
- Ceased operations: 2015
- Hubs: Senou International Airport
- Headquarters: Bamako, Mali

Mali Airways was an airline based in Mali, founded in 2015. Operations never commenced.

In 2025, Mali announced plans to set up a new state-owned airline under the name Mali Airlines S.A.

Mali Airways should not be mistaken for Mali Air, an Austrian business aviation company.
