= List of Burkinabe films =

This is a list of films produced in Burkina Faso by year.

== 1970s ==
Title	Director	Cast	Genre	Notes
1971
No pincha	Tobias Engel		Documentary	Political -
1972
FVVA: Femme, villa, voiture, argent	Moustapha Alassane			
1973
Le Sang des parias	Mamadou Djim Kola			
1975
M'Ba-Raogo	Augustin Roch Taoko			
1976
Sur le chemin de la réconciliation	Rene Bernard Yonli			

== 1980s ==
Title	Director	Cast	Genre	Notes
1981
Poko	Idrissa Ouedraogo		Short	
1982
Wend Kuuni	Gaston Kaboré	Serge Yanogo, Rosine Yanogo, Joseph Nikiema, Colette Kabore, Simone Tapsoba, Yaya Wima, Martine Ouedraogo, Boucare Ouedraogo	Drama	2 wins -
1983
Jours de tourmentes	Paul Zoumbara			1 nomination -
Paweogo	Kollo Sanou			
1984
Les Funérailles du Larle Naba	Idrissa Ouedraogo		Short	
1985
Issa le tisserand	Idrissa Ouedraogo		Short documentary	
Ouagadougou, ouaga deux roues	Idrissa Ouedraogo		Short	
Le Vertige de la passion	Armand Balima			
1986
Sarraounia	Med Hondo		Drama/ History/ War	1 win -
Yam Daabo	Idrissa Ouedraogo			
1987
Desebagato	Emmanuel Sanon-doba			
Dunia	Sekou Traore, S. Pierre Yameogo			
Histoire d'Orokia	Sou Jacob, Jacques Oppenheim			
Yeelen	Souleymane Cissé		Fantasy	4 wins & 2 nominations -
1988
Les Guérisseurs	Sidiki Bakaba			
Zan Boko	Gaston Kaboré			1 win -
1989
Le Grotto	Sou Jacob			
Le Neveu du peintre	Moustapha Dao			
Yaaba	Idrissa Ouedraogo		Drama / Family	3 wins
Yiri Kan	Issiaka Konaté		Short documentary	1 win -

== 1990s ==
Title	Director	Cast	Genre	Notes
1990
Tilaï	Idrissa Ouedraogo	Rasmane Ouedraogo	drama	Won the Jury Grand Prize at Cannes
1993
Samba Traoré	Idrissa Ouedraogo	Bakary Sangaré	drama	Won the Silver Bear at Berlin
Sankofa	Halie Gerima	Kofi Ghanaba, Oyafunmike Ogunlano, Alexandra Duah, Nick Medley, Mutabaruka		Entered into the 43rd Berlin International Film Festival
1994
The Heart's Cry	Idrissa Ouedraogo		drama	also known as Le Cri du coeur
1995
Guimba the Tyrant	Cheick Oumar Sissoko			
1997
Buud Yam	Gaston Kaboré	Serge Yanogo	historical drama	
Kini and Adams	Idrissa Ouedraogo		Drama	Entered into the 1997 Cannes Film Festival

== 2000s ==
Title	Director	Cast	Genre	Notes
2000
Adanggaman	Roger Gnoan M'Bala	Rasmane Ouedraogo	drama	
2001
Bintou	Fanta Régina Nacro		Short	
Sia, le rêve du python				
Tiga guérisseur	Rasmane Tiendrebeogo		Animation	
2003
Anger of the Gods	Idrissa Ouedraogo		drama	also known as La Colère des dieux,
2004
Moolaadé				
Ouaga Saga				
2005
Delwende	S. Pierre Yameogo			Screened at the 2005 Cannes Film Festival
2006
Rêves de poussière	Laurent Salgues		Drama	Nominated for the grand Jury Prize at the Sundance Film Festival
2007
Le Beurre et l'argent du beurre	Alidou Badini; Philippe Baqué		Documentary	Jury Grand Prize at the International Environmental Film Festival of Niamey
2008
Heart of the Lion	Boubacar Diallo			
2009
Le fauteuil	Missa Hebié			
