= List of French films of 2007 =

A list of films produced in France in 2007.

Title	Director	Cast	Genre	Notes
2 Days in Paris	Julie Delpy	Adam Goldberg, Julie Delpy, Daniel Brühl	Romantic comedy	Co-produced with Germany
7 Ans	Jean-Pascal Huttu	Bruno Todeschini	Drama	2 awards at Seattle International Film Festival and Valencia Festival of Mediterranean Cinema
Le Beurre et l'argent du beurre	Alidou Badini, Philippe Baqué		Documentary	Jury Grand Prize at the International Environmental Film Festival of Niamey
Frontier(s)	Xavier Gens	Karina Testa, Aurélien Wiik, Samuel Le Bihan	Horror	co-produced with Switzerland
Ensemble, c'est tout (Hunting and Gathering)	Claude Berri	Audrey Tautou	Drama	
Persepolis	Marjane Satrapi	Chiara Mastroianni	Animation	Golden Globe Award nom., 8 wins, 10 nom.
La Vie en Rose / La Môme	Olivier Dahan	Marion Cotillard, Gérard Depardieu	Biopic	2 Academy Awards, 4 BAFTA Awards, 5 César Awards. It is a French/British/Czech co-production
Le Scaphandre et Le Papillon / The Diving Bell & The Butterfly	Julian Schnabel	Mathieu Amalric, Emmanuelle Seigner, Marie-Josée Croze	Biopic	4 Academy Award nominations (including best director).
À l'intérieur / Inside	Alexandre Bustillo, Julien Maury	Béatrice Dalle, Alysson Paradis	Horror	Won Carnet Jove Jury Award at the Sitges – Catalan International Film Festival
Les Chansons D'Amour	Christophe Honoré	Louis Garrel, Ludivine Sagnier, Clotilde Hesme, Grégoire Leprince Ringuet and Chiara Mastroianni	Musical	One of the 20 films running for the Featured Films competition at the 2007 Cannes Film Festival.
The Last Mistress	Catherine Breillat	Asia Argento	Drama	Entered into the 2007 Cannes Film Festival
Vent mauvais / Ill Wind aka Before the Storm	Stéphane Allagnon	Jonathan Zaccaï, Aure Atika, Bernard Lecoq		
The Grocer's Son (Le fils de l'épicier)	Éric Guirado	Nicolas Cazalé, Clotilde Hesme, Daniel Duval	Drama	
Hellphone	James Huth	Jean-Baptiste Maunier, Jean Dujardin, Édouard Collin	Comedy horror	
A Secret	Claude Miller	Cécile de France, Patrick Bruel, Ludivine Sagnier, Julie Depardieu	Drama	
Boxes	Jane Birkin	Jane Birkin, Geraldine Chaplin, Michel Piccoli		
Hannibal Rising	Peter Webber	Gaspard Ulliel, Gong Li, Rhys Ifans, Dominic West	Thriller/Drama	Co-produced with Italy, United Kingdom, Czech Republic, and United States
Heartbeat Detector (La Question humaine)	Nicolas Klotz	Mathieu Amalric, Michael Lonsdale, Édith Scob	Drama	
99 Francs	Jan Kounen	Jean Dujardin, Jocelyn Quivrin	Satire	Based on a novel with the same title written by Frédéric Beigbeder
Before I Forget	Jacques Nolot	Jacques Nolot, Marc Rioufol, Lyes Rabia, Albert Mainella	Drama	
Taxi 4	Gérard Krawczyk	Samy Naceri, Frédéric Diefenthal, Emma Wiklund	Comedy	
Roman de Gare	Claude Lelouch	Dominique Pinon, Fanny Ardant, Audrey Dana, Zinedine Soualem		
Boarding Gate	Olivier Assayas	Asia Argento, Michael Madsen, Carl Ng, Kelly Lin, Kim Gordon, Sondra Locke	Thriller	The film premiered 18 May at the 2007 Cannes Film Festival
Water Lilies	Céline Sciamma	Pauline Acquart, Louise Blachère, Adèle Haenel	Drama	First film of Céline Sciamma
Actrices	Valeria Bruni Tedeschi	Valeria Bruni Tedeschi, Noémie Lvovsky, Mathieu Amalric, Louis Garrel, Valeria Golino		Prix Spécial du Jury in the Un Certain Regard section of the 2007 Cannes Film Festival
Jacquou le Croquant	Laurent Boutonnat	Gaspard Ulliel, Léo Legrand, Marie-Josée Croze, Albert Dupontel	Historical drama	Based on the novel by Eugène Le Roy
Molière	Laurent Tirard	Romain Duris, Laura Morante, Ludivine Sagnier	Historical drama	Entered into the 29th Moscow International Film Festival
Terror's Advocate	Barbet Schroeder		Documentary	About the lawyer Jacques Vergès
Les témoins	André Téchiné	Michel Blanc, Emmanuelle Béart, Sami Bouajila, Julie Depardieu, Johan Libéreau	Drama	
France-Brésil et autres histoires	Marc Picavez	Solène Sainte-Rose, Ibrahima M'Baye	Documentary	
