= List of drama films of the 1990s =

This is a list of drama films of the 1990s.

== 1990 ==
- An Angel at My Table
- Avalon
- Cyrano de Bergerac
- Dances with Wolves
- Edward Scissorhands
- Flatliners
- The Godfather Part III
- Life Is Sweet
- Longtime Companion
- Maroko
- The Match Factory Girl
- Memories of a River
- Mo' Better Blues
- Mr. and Mrs. Bridge
- Reise der Hoffnung
- Singapore Sling
- Song of the Exile
- Tilaï
- Vincent and Theo

== 1991 ==
- 30 Door Key
- The Adjuster
- Amantes
- La Belle Noiseuse
- Boyz n the Hood
- Days of Being Wild
- The Double Life of Veronique
- Eyes of an Angel
- Europa
- Europa, Europa
- The Fisher King
- The Hours and Times
- Manatsu no Chikyū
- My Own Private Idaho
- Only Yesterday
- Raise the Red Lantern
- Rambling Rose
- Regarding Henry
- Return to the Blue Lagoon
- Roja
- The Stranger
- Together Alone
- Center Stage

== 1992 ==
- Bad Lieutenant
- Batman Returns
- The Bridge
- Un Coeur en Hiver
- CrissCross
- The Crying Game
- Daens
- Daughters of the Dust
- A Few Good Men
- Glengarry Glen Ross
- Gladiator
- Howards End
- Lorenzo's Oil
- Love Field
- Malcolm X
- The Player
- Radio Flyer
- A River Runs Through It
- A Scene at the Sea
- Scent of a Woman
- School Ties
- Unforgiven
- Urga

== 1993 ==
- A Bronx Tale
- A Dangerous Woman
- A Class to Remember
- A Home of Our Own
- A Wall of Silence
- Abraham's Valley
- Actor
- Ad Fundum
- Alive
- Bloom in the Moonlight
- Bodies, Rest & Motion
- Bopha!
- Calendar
- Carlito's Way
- Cronos
- Dangerous Game
- Dragon: The Bruce Lee Story
- Farewell My Concubine
- Fearless
- Fiorile
- Free Willy
- Guelwaar
- House of Cards
- In the Name of the Father
- Indecent Proposal
- Jack the Bear
- The Joy Luck Club
- King of the Hill
- Le Jeune Werther
- M. Butterfly
- The Man Without a Face
- Menace II Society
- Moving
- Mr. Jones
- The Music of Chance
- My Favorite Season
- Naked
- Pater Noster
- Philadelphia
- The Piano
- Poetic Justice
- The Program
- Public Access
- Ruby in Paradise
- Rudy
- The Saint of Fort Washington
- Schindler's List
- Searching for Bobby Fischer
- Shadowlands
- Short Cuts
- Sommersby
- Speak Up! It's So Dark
- Swing Kids
- That Night
- The Age of Innocence
- The Blue Kite
- The Great Pumpkin
- The Man Without a Face
- The Piano
- The Remains of the Day
- The Scent of Green Papaya
- The Secret Garden
- The Slingshot
- Three Colours: Blue
- Untamed Heart
- What's Eating Gilbert Grape
- Wrestling Ernest Hemingway

== 1994 ==
- Above the Rim
- Before the Rain
- A Borrowed Life
- Chungking Express
- Crooklyn
- Ed Wood
- Eden Valley
- Exotica
- Forrest Gump
- Fresh
- The Heart's Cry
- Heavenly Creatures
- I Like You, I Like You Very Much
- The Last Supper
- Léon: The Professional
- The Lion King
- Little Women
- Nell
- Once Were Warriors
- Pom Poko
- Il Postino: The Postman
- Pulp Fiction
- Quiz Show
- Satantango
- The Shawshank Redemption
- Strawberry and Chocolate
- Thirty Two Short Films About Glenn Gould
- Three Colours: Red
- Three Colours: White
- Threesome
- Through the Olive Trees
- To Live
- Vanya on 42nd Street
- Wild Reeds

== 1995 ==
- The Addiction
- Apollo 13
- The Baby-Sitters Club
- Bombay
- The Bridges of Madison County
- La Cérémonie
- Clockers
- Closer to Home
- Cross My Heart and Hope to Die
- Cry, the Beloved Country
- Cyclo
- Dead Homiez
- Dead Man Walking
- Fallen Angels
- Good Men, Good Women
- Kids
- La Haine
- Heat
- Leaving Las Vegas
- A Little Princess
- Maborosi
- Nelly & Monsieur Arnaud
- El pasajero clandestino
- Pocahontas
- Safe
- Summer Snow
- Whisper of the Heart
- White Balloon
- The Wife

== 1996 ==
- L'Appartement
- Breaking the Waves
- Color of a Brisk and Leaping Day
- The Crucible
- The English Patient
- Floating Life
- Forgotten Silver
- Gabbeh
- Gone, Gone Forever Gone
- Goodbye South, Goodbye
- Hamlet
- Hard Eight
- The Hunchback of Notre Dame
- Kolya
- Lone Star
- Marvin's Room
- Once Upon a Time...When We Were Colored
- Pillow Book
- Ponette
- The Portrait of a Lady
- Prisoner of the Mountains
- Ridicule
- Secrets & Lies
- Shine
- A Single Spark
- SLC Punk!
- Sleepers
- Sling Blade
- Twister

== 1997 ==
- 9 millimeter
- Abre los ojos (Open Your Eyes)
- All Over Me
- The Apostle
- The Boxer
- The Butcher Boy
- Buud Yam
- Character
- Dakan (Destiny)
- The Eel
- Good Will Hunting
- A Gun for Jennifer
- Hana-bi (Fireworks)
- Happy Together
- Hold You Tight
- The Ice Storm
- In the Company of Men
- Kini and Adams
- Lawn Dogs
- La vita è bella (Life Is Beautiful)
- Live Flesh
- A Lost Paradise
- Mein Herz – niemandem!
- Mother and Son
- Ossos
- The River
- A River Made to Drown In
- The Sweet Hereafter
- Taste of Cherry
- Titanic
- Under the Lighthouse Dancing

== 1998 ==
- Afrodita, el Jardín de Los Perfumes
- After Life
- Alegria
- Alice and Martin
- American History X
- The Apple
- Central Station
- Deep Impact
- Dil Se..
- Flowers of Shanghai
- Gods and Monsters
- Happy Birthday
- My Name Is Joe
- Pleasantville
- The Prince of Egypt
- Ratcatcher
- Red Violin
- Satya
- Saving Private Ryan
- The Silence
- A Simple Plan

== 1999 ==
- A Dog of Flanders
- A Walk on the Moon
- American Beauty
- Ananta Bhalobasha
- Angela's Ashes
- Any Given Sunday
- Arlington Road
- At First Sight
- Beau Travail
- Body Shots
- The Book of Stars
- Boys Don't Cry
- Bringing Out the Dead
- Brokedown Palace
- Charisma
- The Cider House Rules
- The Color of Paradise
- Cruel Intentions
- The Deep End of the Ocean
- The End of the Affair
- Eyes Wide Shut
- Fight Club
- For Love of the Game
- Friends & Lovers
- Girl, Interrupted
- Guinevere
- The Green Mile
- The Hurricane
- The Insider
- Introducing Dorothy Dandridge
- Lies
- Light It Up
- The Loss of Sexual Innocence
- Magnolia
- Message in a Bottle
- Moonlight Whispers
- Music of the Heart
- October Sky
- Romance
- Samurai X: Trust & Betrayal
- See You in Hell, My Darling
- The Sixth Sense
- A Slipping-Down Life
- The Straight Story
- The Virgin Suicides
- The Wind Will Carry Us
- Twin Falls Idaho
