= Issa Traoré de Brahima =

Burkinabe filmmaker

Issa Traoré De Brahima
- Born: March 26, 1962 (age 63); Abidjan, Ivory Coast
- Occupation: Filmmaker
- Known for: Le Monde Est un Ballet

Issa Traoré de Brahima (born 26 March 1962) is a filmmaker from Burkina Faso.

== Birth and education ==
Issa Traoré De Brahima was born on 26 March 1962 in Abidjan, Ivory Coast, but is a citizen of Burkina Faso. He studied at the African Institute of Cinematographic Studies in Ouagadougou, earning a degree in cinematographic creation in 1985. At the same time, between 1982 and 1985 he worked as a comedian in the Atelier du Théatre Burkinabè theatre company. He then attended the Conservatoire Libre du Cinéma Français, University of Paris VIII. In 1987 he was awarded a prize for editing.

== Career ==
In 1989, Issa Traoré De Brahima codirected the short film Bilakoro with Dani Kouyaté and Sékou Traoré, and the next year assisted Dani Kouyaté with his film "Poussière de Lait". In 1992 he, Dani Kouyate and Sekou Traore founded the production company Sahelis Productions. In 1994 he produced his first short film, Gombele. He was assistant director on various films including Dani Kouyaté's Keïta! l'Héritage du Griot, J. Mrozowski's La revanche de Lucie and Issaka Konaté's Souko, le Cinematographe en carton. His 2006 film Le Monde Est un Ballet (The world is a ballet) was nominated at the Panafrican Film and Television Festival of Ouagadougou in 2007.

Issa Traoré De Brahima believes that films have an important role in political propaganda, as a weapon of struggle. However, he has said of his work that he just makes observations. It is up to his audience to draw conclusions.

== Filmography ==
Selected films:

- Le Monde Est un Ballet (The world is a ballet) (2006)
- Femmes du Sahel (2004) documentary
- Siraba, la grande voie (2001) fiction (104'), 35mm, color
- Afrique réseau 2000 (2001) documentary
- La rencontre (The Meeting) (co-director with Seydou Bouro, 2001) documentary
- Boubou l'intrus (Boubou the intruder) (1998), fiction (short film)
- Gombèle (1994), fiction (27')
- Bilakoro (co-director with Dani Kouyaté and Sékou Traoré, 1989), fiction (15'), 16mm
