= Lova Nantenaina =

Malagasy film director (born 1977)

- Born: March 7, 1977 (age 49); Antsirabe, Madagascar
- Education: École Supérieure d'Audiovisuel
- Occupation: Film director
- Notable work: Ady Gasy (2014)

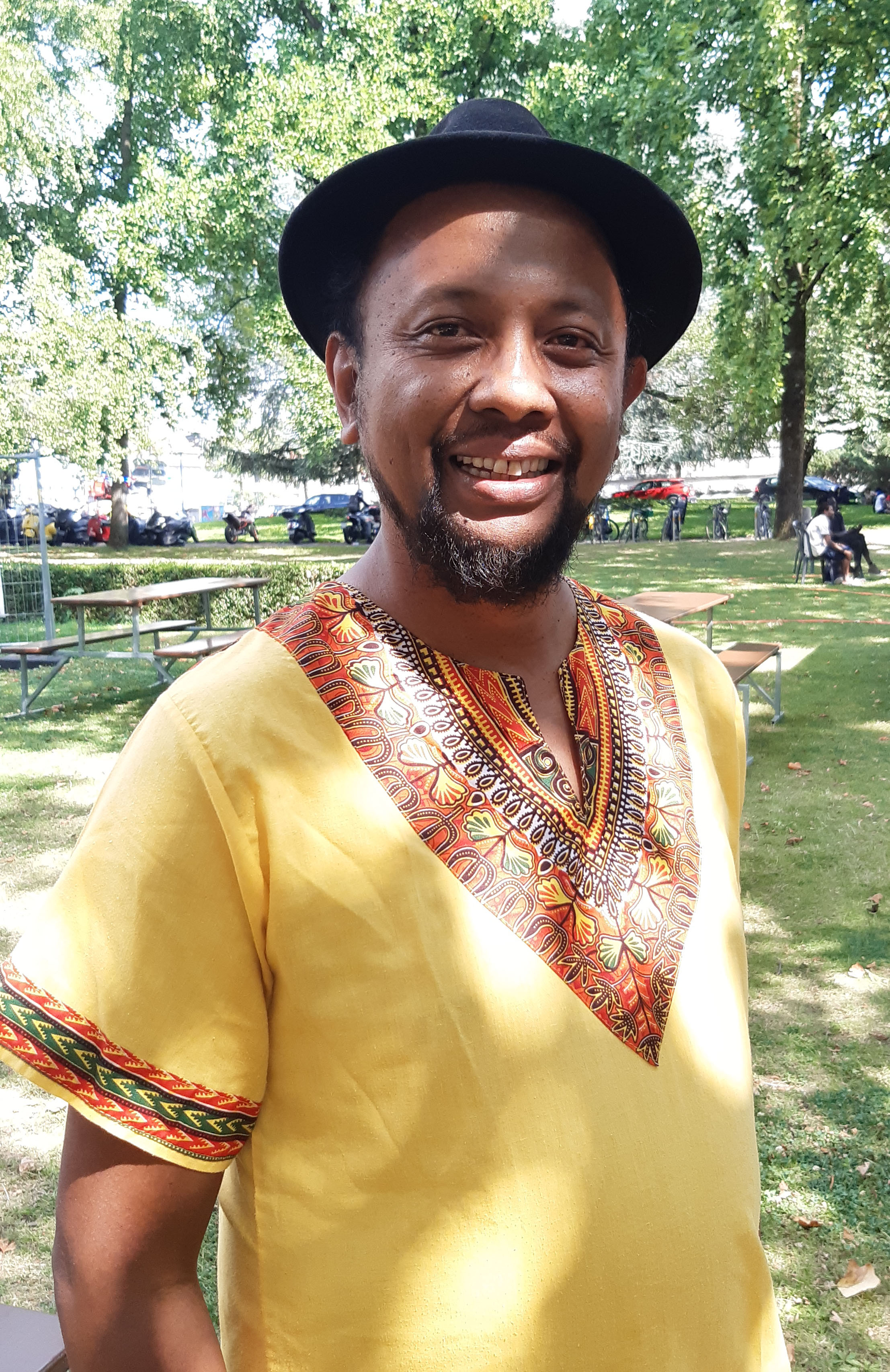
Nantenaina Lova

Lova Nantenaina (born 7 March 1977) is a Malagasy film director.

== Biography ==
Nantenaina grew up in Antananarivo and attended the school of Analamahitsy. He developed a passion for cinema from a young age. In 1999, Nantenaina moved to France to study sociology. He was involved in a Madagascar development project in 2001, learning that outside advice is often not appreciated. After returning to Madagascar in 2003, Nantenaina failed to find a position as a development agent. Instead, he found a job as a journalist at Les Nouvelles. He continued his studies in computer science at Réunion in 2005. In 2008, Nantenaina applied to study filmmaking at the École Supérieure d'Audiovisuel in Toulouse, and was accepted. He received his master's degree with honors.

Alongside his wife Eva Lova and Candy Radifera, he formed the production company Endemika Films in 2008. Most of its output has been short programming for children. The company also produces documentaries.

Nantenaina released his first feature documentary Avec Presque Rien... in 2013, featuring the poverty that he grew up with. It received the Sustainable Development Award at the Vues d'Afrique festival in Montreal. In 2014, Nantenaina directed the documentary Ady Gasy. The film details Nantenaina's interviews with Malagasy people about the conditions in their country. It received the Eden Grand Prize for best documentary at the Lumiere d'Afrique festival as well as the Indian Ocean Prize at the International Film Festival of Africa and the Islands. He directed the short documentary Zanaka, ainsi parlait Félix in 2019. The film details the 1947 insurrection against the French rule that resulted in the deaths of thousands. It was awarded the Poulain d'argent in the FESPACO and the Zebu d'Or in the Pan-African documentary category by the Rencontres du Film Court Madagascar.

== Partial filmography ==
- 2007 : 2€ à Madagascar (short film)
- 2007 : L'envers du décor - Lettre à mon frère (short film)
- 2008 : Petits Hommes (short film)
- 2009 : Le Rouge du Paradis (short film)
- 2011 : Conter les feuilles (short film)
- 2013 : Avec Presque Rien...
- 2014 : Ady GasyThe Malagasy Way
- 2017 : Lakana (short film)
- 2019 : Zanaka, ainsi parlait Félix (short film)
