= Cri de Coeur =

Cri De Coeur or Cri du coeur may refer to:

- Cri De Coeur, a 2003 album by Sonja Kristina
- Cri De Coeur, a Hugo Award-nominated short story by Michael Bishop
- Cri De Coeur, a newsletter by Jeunesse Militante, the youth wing of Mouvement Militant Mauricien
- Le Cri du coeur, the French title of the French language film The Heart's Cry
- "Cri de Coeur", an episode of the third season of Netflix series The Crown

== See also ==
- Heart's Cry (disambiguation)
