= Hamadoun Kassogué =

Malian actor

- Born: 1957 (age 68–69); Kani Gogouna, Bandiagara Circle, Mali
- Occupations: Actor, comedian

Hamadoun Kassogué, also known as Kerifa and Kass, is a Malian actor born around 1957 in Kani Gogouna, in the commune of Wadouba.

== Biography ==
Hamadoun Kassogué was born in 1957 in the village of Kani Godouna, in the commune of Wadouba (Bandiagara Circle). He attended the National Institute of Arts, Kinshasa.

== Career ==
Kassogué began his film career in 2001 by playing the role of Kerfa the Fool in the film Sia, The Dream of the Python by Dani Kouyaté. He later appeared in several films such as Kabala by Assane Kouyaté (2002); the 2001 TV series Les aventures de Séko Boiré written by Habib Dembélé; Bamako by Abderrahmane Sissako; Le Sage de Bandiagara by Louis Deck, where he not only acted but also served as assistant director; Toiles d'araignées by Ibrahima Touré (2011), and Wallay by Berni Goldblat (2017).

Kassogué has also worked in the theatre, particularly with Alioune Ifra Ndiaye and the BlonBa theatre troupe.
