= Seydou Boro =

Burkinabé actor (born 1968)

- Born: 20 February 1968 (age 58); Ouagadougou, Burkina Faso
- Occupations: Actor, dancer, choreographer
- Notable work: Keïta! l'Héritage du griot

Seydou Boro (born 20 February 1968 in Ouagadougou) is a Burkinabé actor, dancer, and choreographer. He played the lead in the 1995 Dani Kouyate-directed film Keïta! l'Héritage du griot.

== Discography ==
- Hôrôn' (Label Bleu, 2016)
