= Sahelis Productions =

Coordinates: 12°22′13″N 1°29′25″W

- Industry: Video production
- Founded: 1992
- Headquarters: Ouagadougou, Burkina Faso
- Key people: Lacina Ouédraogo (manager)
- Website: www.sahelis.com

Sahelis Productions is a film and television video production and post-production company based in Ouagadougou, Burkina Faso. The company was founded in 1992 by Sékou Traoré (Director), Issa Traoré de Brahima (Director, Artistic Director) and Dani Kouyaté (Director).

== History ==
The three founders were studying film together in Paris in 1989 when they decided to found the company. They were assisted in launching Sahelis Production in 1992 by filmmakers Lacina Ouédraogo and Abdoulaye Dao, and by Paris-based Claude Gilaizeau of "Productions de la Lanterne". Sékou Traoré was manager from 1992 to 2007. Dani Kouyaté and Issa Traore de Brahima co-managed the company from 2007 to 2011. Lacina Ouédraogo became manager in March 2011. The company has produced or co-produced six feature films and about fifteen short films. Sahelis has also made many commercials and twenty documentary films.

== Filmography ==
=== Fiction feature films ===
Year	Film	Notes
2007	Le Monde Est un Ballet (The world is a ballet)	Issa Traoré De Brahima
2005	Rêves de poussière (Dreams of dust or Buried Dreams)	Laurent Salgues
2004	Ouaga-Saga	Dani Kouyaté. Shot in Ouagadougou, post-production in Paris.
1999	Sia, le rêve du python (Sia, the dream of the python)	Dani Kouyaté. A traditional tale used to comment on modern-day oppression by African leaders.
2001	Siraba	Issa Traoré De Brahima
2001	Voyage a Ouaga	Camille Mouyéké
1997	La Revanche de Lucy	Henry Y. Mrozowski
1994	Keïta! l'Héritage du griot	Dani Kouyaté. Won the Junior Prize at the Cannes Film Festival.

=== Fiction short films ===
Year	Film	Notes
2001	GOREL	Sékou Traoré
2001	FLEURS D'EPINES (Flowers with thorns)	Alidou Badini
1999	BOUBOU L'INTRUS	Issa Traoré De Brahima
1998	A L'OMBRE D'UN TAMARINIER (In the shade of a tamarind tree)	Dramane Démé
1995	LES ENFANTS DU SOLEIL (Children of the sun)	Issiaka Konaté
1997	SOUKO (LE CINEMATOGRAPHE EN CARTON)	Issiaka Konaté
1995	YAANGO	Adama Rouamba
1994	MARAL TANIE	Mahamat Saleh Haroun
1993	INTERFERENCES	Raymond Tiendré
1993	LES LARMES SACRÉES DU CROCODILE (The tears of the sacred crocodile)	Dani Kouyaté
1993	GOMBELE (L'ALBINOS)	Issa Traoré De Brahima

=== Documentaries ===
Year	Film	Notes
2011	L’ENVIRONNEMENT, UN BIEN ECONOMIQUE A GERER DURABLEMENT	Lacina Ouédraogo
2011	LE PROGRAMME D’URGENCE DE LUTTE CONTRE LE CRIQUET PELERIN EN AFRIQUE	Issa Traoré De Brahima
2010	GESTION DES PETITS BARRAGES AU BURKINA FASO. QUELLE ALTERNATIVE ?	Issa Traoré De Brahima
2010	LA TUBERCULOSE, ON EN GUERIT	Issa Traoré De Brahima
2010	FEMMES RURALES, DROITS HUMAINS ET GOUVERNANCE LOCALE	Issa Traoré De Brahima
2009	FEMMES HANDICAPEES ET LUTTE CONTRE LA PAUVRETE	Issa Traoré De Brahima
2010	LA MARE D’OURSI, Préservons là !	Issa Traoré De Brahima
2008	AQUACULTURE, UNE ALTERNATIVE	Issa Traoré De Brahima
2007	KALFA	Issiaka Traoré
2006	Le Beurre et l'argent du beurre	Philippe Baqué and Alidou Badini
2005	DU VENIN DANS LA SOUPE	Alidou Badini
2006	LE NAUFRAGE NEGRO-LIBERAL	Bacary Sanon
2004	Les petits métiers du Sahel (Small trades of the Sahel)	Sékou Traoré 2 parts: GERMAIN ENTRE BOITES & FIL DE FER; DE LA TEINTURE AUX MOTIFS
2004	PROGRAMME DE LUTTE CONTRE LE STRIGA EN AFRIQUE	Sékou Traoré
2004	UNE EXPERIENCE DE PRISE DE RESPONSABILITE; DES POPULATIONS ET DES ORGANISATIONS LOCALES DU ZOUNDWEOGO	Issa Traoré De Brahima
2004	FEMMES DU SAHEL	Issa Traoré De Brahima
2002	DANSEUSE D'ÉBÈNE	Seydou Boro
2001	AFRIQUE RÉSEAU 2000 (PNUD)	Issa Traoré De Brahima
2001	LE COMBAT DES ORGANISATIONS PAYSANNES CONTRE LA DESERTIFICATION	Lacina Ouédraogo
2001	LA RENCONTRE	Seydou Bouro et Issa Traoré De Brahima
2000	LA FORÊT "DANSE"	Drissa Touré
1998	WARBASSANGA	Maïmouna N'Diaye
1997	ISMAËL, UN EXEMPLE DE COURAGE	Sékou Traoré
1997	UNE FEMME DES ÉLEVEURS	Sékou Traoré
