= Sékou Traoré =

Burkinabe filmmaker

- Occupation: Filmmaker
- Known for: Gorel ou le Mil Promis

Sékou Traoré is a filmmaker from Burkina Faso. He and his friends Dani Kouyaté and Issa Traoré de Brahima established the production company Sahelis Productions in 1992. He has worked as director, producer and production manager on a number of films, including both fiction and documentary.

== Filmography ==
A partial list of films:

| Year | Title | Role | Notes |
|---|---|---|---|
| 2015 | Eye of the Storm | Director | 101 minutes: Drama |
| 2010 | Notre étrangère | Co-producer | 82 minutes. Director: Sarah Bouyain. |
| 2010 | Un Homme Qui Crie (A screaming man) | Production Manager | 100 minutes. Feature film. Director: Mahamat Saleh Haroun. Jury Prize at the 2010 Cannes Film Festival. |
| 2007 | Rêves de poussière (Dreams of Dust) | Associate Producer | 86 minutes. Director: Laurent Salgues; Nominated for the grand Jury Prize at the Sundance Film Festival |
| 2006 | Djanta | Director of Photography | 106 minutes. Director: Tahirou Tasséré Ouédraogo |
| 2004 | GERMAIN ENTRE BOITES & FIL DE FER | Director | Documentary |
| 2004 | DE LA TEINTURE AUX MOTIFS | Director | Documentary |
| 2004 | PROGRAMME DE LUTTE CONTRE LE STRIGA EN AFRIQUE | Director | Documentary |
| 2003 | Gorel ou le Mil Promis | Director | 45 minutes: Short fiction |
| 2003 | Siraba, La Grande Voie | Producer | 90 minutes. Director: Issa Traoré de Brahima |
| 2001 | Sia, le rêve du python | Co-producer | 96 minutes. Director: Dani Kouyaté. |
| 1997 | ISMAËL, UN EXEMPLE DE COURAGE | Director | Documentary |
| 1997 | UNE FEMME DES ÉLEVEURS | Director | Documentary |
| 1989 | Bilakoro | Writer | 15 minutes. Directors: Dani Kouyaté, Issa Traoré de Brahima |
