= Richard Sseruwagi =

Swedish-Ugandan actor (born 1954)

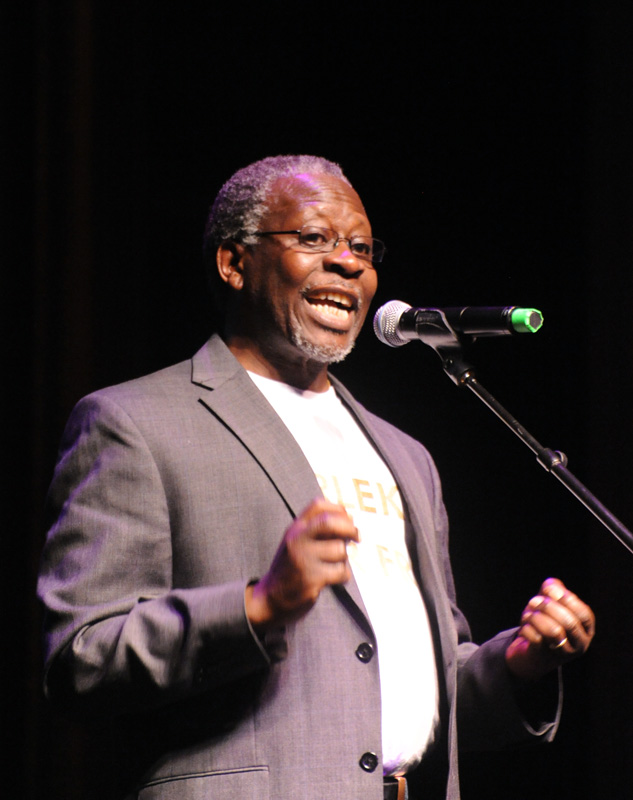
- Born: Richard Sseruwagi; 8 August 1954 (age 72); Masaka, Uganda
- Occupations: Actor, musician
- Years active: 1993–present
- Spouse: Anne Sseruwagi

Richard Kaigoma Sseruwagi (born 8 August 1954), is a Swedish-based Ugandan actor and musician. He is best known for his role as "Sekou" in the 2019 Swedish film While We Live.

== Personal life ==
He was born on 8 August 1954 in Matanga, Masaka, Uganda. He studied at the Abafumi Theater Academy in Kampala, Uganda.

== Career ==
He fled from the country in 1977 during the rule of dictator Idi Amin. In 1978, he was granted asylum in Sweden and eventually became a Swedish citizen.

He started to act in Swedish theatre, and later appeared in the drama series Tre Kronor (Three Crowns).

In 2019, he acted in the Swedish film While We Live directed by Dani Kouyaté. The film received critics acclaim and screened in several film festivals. The film later won the award for Best Film by an African Living Abroad at the Africa Movie Academy Awards in Lagos, Nigeria.

Apart from acting, Sseruwagi is also a recording artist.

== Filmography ==
Year	Film	Role	Genre	Ref.
1993	Speak Up! It's So Dark...	Refugee	Film	
1996	Tre kronor	Salongo Sali	TV series	
1996	The White Lioness	Tsiki	Film	
2005	The Laser Man	Charles Mutero	TV mini series	
2007	Köra runt	The Pick-Up Guy	Short film	
2009	Familjen Babajou	uncle Jacob	TV series	
2009	På Perrongen	Brunost54	Short film	
2011	Arne Dahl: Misterioso	Kimbareta Makanga	TV mini series	
2012	Äkta människor	Läkare	TV series	
2015	100 Code	Detective 2	TV series	
2015	Beck	Imam Ali Yousuf Boudin	TV series	
2015	The Prosecutor the Defender the Father and His Son	Third judge	Film	
2016	Springfloden	Mikael Florén	TV series	
2016	While We Live	Sekou	Film	
2018	Dansa först	Grandfather George	Film	
2018	Alone in Space	General Frank Harrison	Film	
2021	Successful Thawing of Mr. Moro	Milo Moro	Short film	
2021	Änglavakt	Patrice	TV series	
2021	Notes	Neighbor	Short film	
TBD	Andra akten	Tyson	Film	
TBD	Att Rädda En Pojke	Abdi	Film	
