= Heart's Cry =

Heart's Cry may refer to:

- Heart's Cry (horse), racehorse
- "Heart's Cry", a 2016 song by Chris Quilala from Split the Sky
- The Heart's Cry, 1994 Burkinabé/French drama film

== See also ==
- Cri de Coeur (disambiguation)
