= Pierre Rigal =

- Occupation(s): Dancer, choreographer
- Years active: 2003 - present

Pierre Rigal (born 1973) is a French dancer and choreographer based in Toulouse, France.

== Life and career ==
Pierre Rigal originally trained to be an athlete in 400m race and 400m hurdles. He studied mathematics and economics at the University of Barcelona and graduated with a master's degree in cinema from École Supérieure d'Audiovisuel de Toulouse in 1997, but became interested in dance after meeting choreographers and directors. In 2002, he joined a dance company, working under the choreographer Gilles Jobin. In 2003 Rigal founded his own Compagnie Dernière Minute. He choreographed and produced his first pieces, érection (2003), and Arrêts de Jeu (2006) in collaboration with the director Aurélien Bory. His work has been well-reviewed in New York City, performed at the Baryshnikov Arts Center and described as original and progressive.

== Works ==
Selected works include:

- érection (2003)
- Arrêts de Jeu (2006)
- press (2009)
- asphalte (2009)
- Micro (2011)
