= Heart of the Lion =

- French: Cœur de lion
- Directed by: Boubacar Diallo
- Screenplay by: Boubacar Diallo
- Produced by: Les Films du dromadaire
- Starring: Housseini Boly; Coumba Barry; Mahamadi Nana; Carole Bassolé; Mahamoudou Tapsoba
- Cinematography: Daniel Barrau
- Edited by: Nède M. Ganafé Mofédog-na
- Music by: Charly Sidibé
- Release date: 2008
- Running time: 91 minutes
- Country: Burkina Faso
- Language: French

Heart of the Lion (French: Coeur de lion) is a 2008 Burkinabé film.

== Synopsis ==
A lion causes ravages among the livestock. Several people disappear. Seeing the village chief doing nothing, a young shepherd, Samba, decides to follow the lion's tracks on his own. But not just anyone can hunt a lion and Samba is trapped by it. Despite his courage, the lion almost kills him. Luckily, a young hunter appears and kills the animal. Samba's life is saved, but not his honor. He wants to take the lion's tale back to the village, but Tanko won't let him. The trophy is his. The lion is dead, yet people keep on disappearing.

== Prizes ==
- FESPACO 2009
