= Genesis (2004 film) =

- Directed by: Claude Nuridsany; Marie Pérennou
- Written by: Claude Nuridsany; Marie Pérennou
- Produced by: Alain Sarde
- Starring: Sotigui Kouyaté
- Cinematography: Patrice Aubertel; William Lubtchansky; Claude Nuridsany; Marie Pérennou; Cyril Tricot
- Edited by: Pauline Casalis; Marie-Josèphe Yoyotte
- Music by: Bruno Coulais
- Production company: StudioCanal
- Distributed by: BAC Films (France); Lucky Red (Italy); THINKFilm (United States}
- Release dates: September 27, 2004 (Hamburg Film Festival); October 20, 2004 (France); May 27, 2005 (Los Angeles)
- Running time: 81 minutes
- Countries: France; Italy
- Language: French

Genesis is a 2004 documentary film written and directed by Claude Nuridsany and Marie Pérennou that explores the origins of earth and its inhabitants. The film focuses on the life of many animals. It is narrated by Sotigui Kouyaté.

The film credits also list the natural events, animals and their situations as part of the "cast list."
