= While We Live =

2019 Swedish film

- Swedish: Medan vi lever
- Directed by: Dani Kouyaté
- Written by: Dani Kouyaté; Olivier Guerpillon
- Produced by: Maria Larsson Guerpillon; Julien Siri
- Starring: Josette Bushell-Mingo; Adam Kanyama; Richard Sseruwagi
- Cinematography: Alex Lindén
- Edited by: Philip Bergström
- Music by: Andreas Unge
- Production companies: DFM; Film i Skåne; Way Creative Films
- Distributed by: Njutafilms
- Release date: 7 October 2016
- Running time: 91 minutes
- Country: Sweden
- Languages: Swedish; English

While We Live (Swedish: Medan vi lever) is a 2016 Swedish comedy-drama film written and directed by Burkinabé filmmaker Dani Kouyaté and co-produced by Maria Larsson Guerpillon and Julien Siri. This is his first Swedish film. The film stars Josette Bushell-Mingo, Adam Kanyama and Richard Sseruwagi in lead roles, whereas Marika Lindström, Sten Ljunggren and Philip Lithner made supportive roles. The film was shot at Malmö, Sweden.

The film won award for the Best Film by an African Living Abroad at Africa Movie Academy Awards, Lagos, Nigeria. The film also nominated for the Best Editing award and Best Screenplay award at the ceremony.

== Cast ==
- Josette Bushell-Mingo as Kandia
- Adam Kanyama as Ibbe
- Richard Sseruwagi as Sekou
- Marika Lindström as Ylva
- Sten Ljunggren as Olof
- Philip Lithner as Billy
- Anna Blomberg as Eva
- Mårten Klingberg as Music producer
- Lamine Dieng as Modu
- Kudzai Chimbaira as Soukeina
- Susan Fatima Joh as Aisha
- Christopher Tijan-Smith as Karim
- Mariama Colley as Lala
- Suntou Susso as Ismaël
- Felix Down-Thomas as Famuru
- Janet Badjan-Young as Mbalou
- Jane Owens as Awa
- Aurelia Prom as Fatou
- Peter Öberg as Polis
- Gibril Jobe as Polis
- Karin Bertling as Old woman on bus
- Tom Ahlsell as Hospital patient
- Bill Hugg as Taxi customer
- Nina Melo as Young Kandia
- Sven Boräng as Kandia's man
- Caroline Borg as Surgeon
- Patrik Fridh as Bussresenär
