= Sotigui Kouyaté =

Burkinabé actor and footballer (1936–2010)

Sotigui Kouyate
- Born: 19 July 1936; Bamako, Mali
- Died: 17 April 2010 (aged 73); Paris, France
- Occupation: Actor

Sotigui Kouyaté (19 July 1936 – 17 April 2010) was one of the first Malian Burkinabé actors. He was the father of film director Dani Kouyaté, of the storyteller Hassane Kassi Kouyaté and of the actor Mabô Kouyaté and was a member of the Mandinka ethnic group.

Members of Kouyaté's lineage or clan have served as griots for the Keita dynasty since at least the 13th century. The Kouyatés guard customs, and their knowledge is authoritative among Mandinkas. Keitas have to provide amenities to Kouyatés, who in turn should not hesitate to ask for Keita's help. The word Kouyaté translates as "there is a secret between you and me".

== Biography ==
Sotigui Kouyaté was born in Mali to Guinean parents and is Burkinabé by adoption. When he was a child, he enjoyed Kotéba performances. He once played on the Burkina Faso national football team. Kouyaté began his theatre career in 1966, when he appeared as adviser to the king in a historical play produced by his friend Boubacar Dicko. That year, he founded a theatre company with 25 people and soon wrote his first play, The Crocodile’s Lament.

Kouyaté has worked with Peter Brook on his theater and film projects since they became associated with one another while working on Brook's adaptation of the Indian epic The Mahabharata in 1983. Kouyaté has appeared in over two dozen films, most recently as Jacob in Genesis and Alioune in Little Senegal. Kouyaté played the central role of Djeliba Kouyaté in Dani Kouyaté's 1995 film Keïta! l'Héritage du griot, the character being imagined as an old dying man by his son, though portrayed as more forceful than that. The elder Kouyaté also plays instruments, simple melodies on the kora or flute.

From 1990 to 1996 Kouyaté toured the United States and Europe as part of La Voix du Griot ("Voice of the Griot"), a storytelling theater show he founded. When asked in an October 2001 interview whether he felt he was carrying a message from Africa, he replied:

Let’s be modest. Africa is vast, and it would be pretentious to speak in its name. I’m fighting the battle with words because I’m a storyteller, a griot. Rightly or wrongly, they call us masters of the spoken word. Our duty is to encourage the West to appreciate Africa more. It’s also true that many Africans don’t really know their own continent. And if you forget your culture, you lose sight of yourself. It is said that “the day you no longer know where you’re going, just remember where you came from.” Our strength lies in our culture. Everything I do as a storyteller, a griot, stems from this rooting and openness.

In 2009, Kouyaté won a Silver Bear at the Berlinale Filmfestival for his acting. He played the main male character in Rachid Bouchareb's drama London River, about the 2005 London bombings. On 17 April 2010, he died in Paris.

Sotigui Kouyate: A Modern Griot

Director: Mahamat-Saleh Haroun From: Chad/France Year: 1996 Minutes:58 Language: French with English subtitles Genre: Documentary

- Official selection, African Diaspora Film Festival 2007

When casting The Mahabharata, director Peter Brook's assistant selected actor Sotigui Kouyaté for the lead role of Bhishma. Born in 1936 in Bamako (Mali), Kouyaté was a member of a griot family, a lineage traditionally responsible for oral history, mediation, and musical performance. Throughout his career, he has worked as a composer, dancer, and actor, passing these professional practices down to his children and students across the world. He has appeared in approximately 60 films, including Sia The Dream of the Python directed by his son Dany Kouyate and Names Live Nowhere, a film documenting African immigrants in Belgium.

The 1995 documentary Sotigui Kouyate: a Modern Griot profiles the life and career of the Paris-based African actor and musician. Through interviews by Peter Brook, Jean-Claude Carriere, Jean-Pierre Guigane and Sotigui Kouyate himself, the film details his work across Africa and Europe as an actor, musician and modern griot. The documentary won an ACCT award at the Amiens Film Festival, 1996.

In an article for the UNESCO Courier, journalist Cynthia Guttman characterized his career as a cross-cultural effort to "break ignorance of Africa's living traditions and spark encounters across continents".

== Selected filmography ==
- 2008: London River
- 2007: Faro, Goddess of the Waters
- 2005: The Ring Finger
- 2004: Genesis (2004 film)
- 2002: Dirty Pretty Things (film)
- 2001: Sia, The Dream of the Python
- 2001: Little Senegal (film)
- 1999: Genesis (1999 film)
- 1997: Keïta! l'Héritage du griot
- 1996: The Human Plant
- 1993: Lost in Transit
- 1992: Golem, the Spirit of the Exile
- 1992: IP5: L'île aux pachydermes
- 1989: The Mahabharata
- 1973: Toula ou Le génie des eaux
- 1972: Women Cars Villas Money
