= Yam Daabo =

Yam Daabo (The Choice)
- Directed by: Idrissa Ouédraogo
- Screenplay by: Idrissa Ouédraogo
- Produced by: Les Films de l'Avenir
- Starring: Aoua Guiraud Bologo Moussa Assita Ouedraogo Fatimata Ouedraogo Rasmine Ouedraogo
- Cinematography: Jean Monsigny Sékou Ouedraogo Issaka Thiombiano
- Edited by: Arnaud Blin
- Music by: Francis Bebey
- Release date: 1987
- Running time: 79 minutes
- Countries: Burkina Faso; France

Yam Daabo (also released as Le Choix (English: The Choice)) is a 1987 Burkinabè film directed by Idrissa Ouédraogo. The film is the director's first feature film and has received several awards including the Silver Charybdis at the Taormina International Film Festival in 1987.

== Plot ==
The story takes place mostly in rural Burkina Faso, and follows the fortunes of one peasant family. Most of the narrative centres around Bintou, the daughter of the family, who is pursued by two men: Issa and Tiga. She has a relationship with Issa, becoming pregnant by him. Her father discovers this and, in anger, ejects Issa from the home. Later on, as Bintou goes into labour, her father is encouraged to change his mind, and welcomes Issa back into the family, in time for the whole family to celebrate the birth of a baby son together.

Tiga remains jealous of Issa, culminating in an attempt to shoot Issa. Tiga's father and Bintou's father overpower Tiga, saving Issa's life. Tiga is banished from the family and heads to the city, where he attempts to steal a motorbike.

Although most events take place in rural settings, there are two significant episodes which happen in a nearby, unnamed city. The first happens early in the film, when Bintou's family take their cart and donkey to sell in the city. On this visit to the city, their son Ali is killed by a car. The second happens at the very end of the film, even after the reunion of Issa with the rest of the family. This is when we follow the banished Tiga to the city, watch him attempt a theft, and then flee. As he is fleeing, he is aided by a man he recognises as Raogo, former love interest of his sister (and Bintou's friend). He encourages Raogo to return to his former lover, which Raogo does. The final scene of the film shows Raogo, reunited with the whole cast of characters, as they return to work.

== Cast ==
- Aoua Guiraud - Bintou
- Moussa Bologo - Issa
- Ousmane Sawadogo - Salam, Bintou and Ali's father
- Fatimata Ouédraogo - Bintou and Ali's mother
- Assita Ouédraogo - Tipoko, Bintou's friend
- Rasmané Ouédraogo - Tiga
- Salif Ouédraogo - Tibo, Tiga and Tipoko's father
- Omar Ouédraogo - Raogo, Tipoko's boyfriend
- Madi Sana - Ali

== Credits ==
- Director - Idrissa Ouédraogo
- Screenplay - Idrissa Ouédraogo
- Production - Les Films de l’Avenir
- Cinematography - Jean Monsigny, Sékou Ouédraogo, Issaka Thiombiano
- Edit - Arnaud Blin
- Sound - Issa Traore, Joseph Traore
- Assistant director - Ismael Ouédraogo
- Music - Francis Bebey
- Still photographer - Véronique Patte

== Analysis ==
The 'choice' referred to by the film's title could have several meanings. Most obviously, it could refer to Bintou's decision between Tiga and Issa. Alternatively, given the film's split location between city and countryside, the title could refer to the 'choices' made by several characters between a traditional rural life of subsistence farming and family dependence, and urban life. The film arguably presents the former as preferable and more humane than the latter. Tiga makes choices that lead him to the city, where he ends up committing crime and running for his life. Raogo also chose urban life - upsetting his then-girlfriend - and ultimately reneges on this choice. (However, he returns home with better clothes than most characters, and with a gift for his former girlfriend). Bintou's father 'chooses' to sell the family's donkey and cart, for which an arduous journey to the city is necessary. It was even, arguably, the distractions of urban life that led to Ali's death early on in the film - when is seen staring at a poster just before being hit by a car.

A third reading of the title could be that "The Choice" is a bitterly sarcastic title for a film in which so much of the characters' activities are dictated by the necessities of survival. We watch characters clearing land, farming, fishing, building a shelter and walking to fetch water. The film opens on a scene of someone forging a metal tool, and closes with Bintou's father telling everyone "let's go, work waits for us". It is unlikely that Bintou's father had much 'choice' in whether to sell the donkey and cart or not - and he certainly had no choice in the price he was paid. Having seen the way these 'choices' are determined by economic factors outside the characters' control, the viewer is led to reconsider Raogo's story: why did he leave for the city? Is it something to do with the nice clothes and gift he ends up acquiring? Is this a 'choice'?
