= École Supérieure d'Audiovisuel =

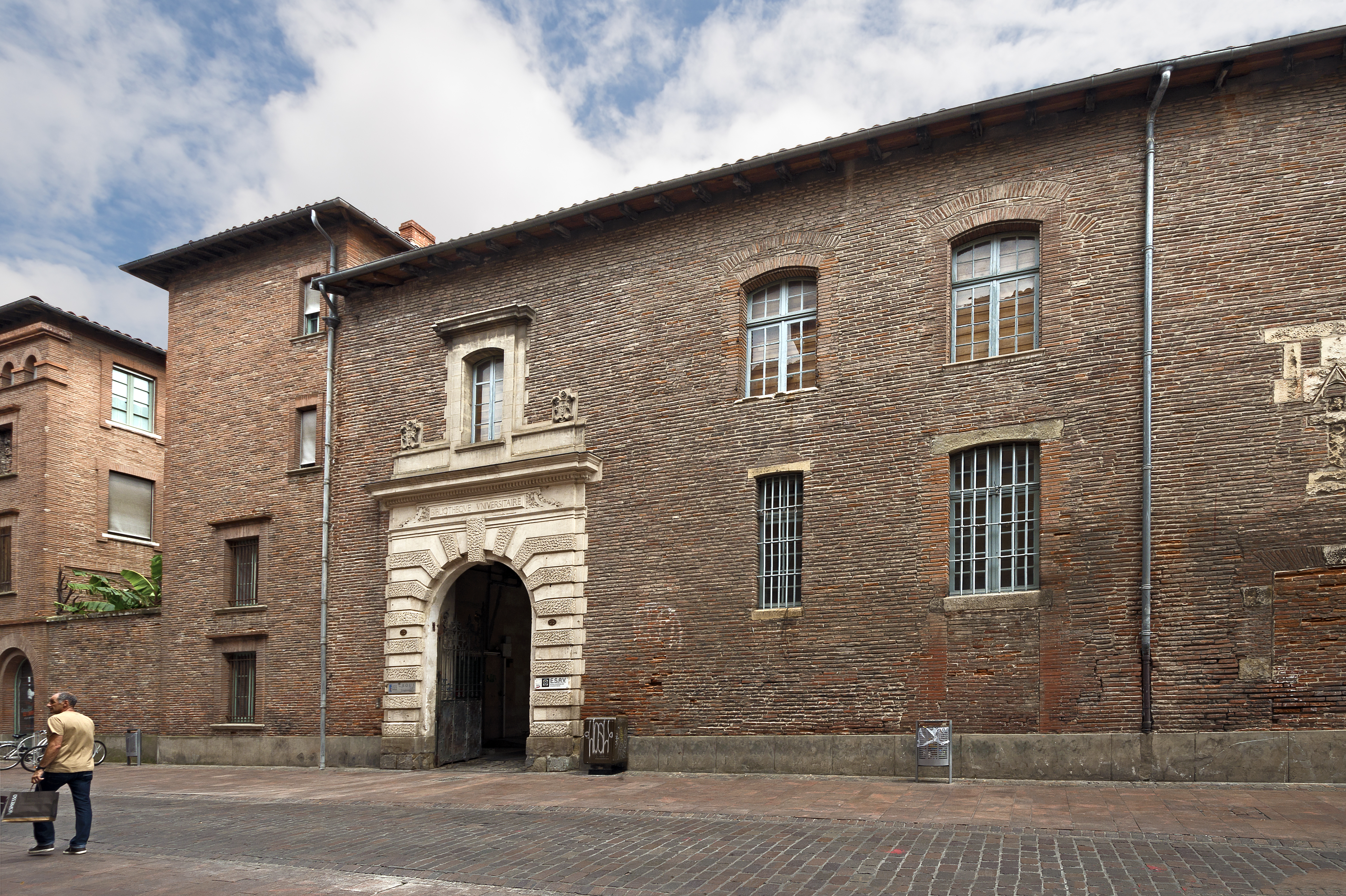
- ESAV in Toulouse
- Type: School of audiovisual trades
- Established: 1978
- Affiliations: University of Toulouse II
- Director: Alexandre Beznosiuk
- Location: Toulouse, France; 43.607170°N 1.442310°E
- Website: www.esav.fr

The École Supérieure d'Audiovisuel (ESAV - Graduate School of Audiovisual) is an educational institute in Toulouse that teaches aspects of filmmaking. It was created in 1978 under the leadership of the University of Toulouse-Le Mirail and Guy Chapouillié. It issues Level 3 license, Master 1 and Master 2 certificates. The Master 2 leads eventually to a PhD course.

The school has a library created in 1989 that holds more than 10,000 documents, mainly books and movies in the audiovisual field. It preserves and promotes the works of students of the school.

== Notable graduates ==
- Pierre Rigal, dancer and choreographer.
- Laurent Salgues, director of Rêves de poussière (2007).
