= Mal Pelo =

Dance group in Spain

Mal Pelo is a Catalan contemporary dance ensemble based in Barcelona, Spain. The ensemble was established in January 1989 by choreographers Pep Ramis and María Muñoz, who continue to act as Artistic Directors. Since its inception, the company has made itself well known in Spain and the rest of Europe. The ensemble has also performed in the U.S. at festivals and in New York City at the Baryshnikov Arts Center. The group's work is described as "rooted in its own poetic view of the world".

== Works ==
The company produces both traditional and multi-media works. Selected compositions include:

- Quarere, 1989
- Lucas, 1990
- Sur, Perros Del Sur, 1992
- Canción para los Pájaros, 1993
- La Mirada de Búbal, 1993
- Dol, 1994
- Zarco, 1995
- La Calle Del Imaginero, 1996
- Canción de Bernabé, 1997
- Orache, 1998
- El Alma Del Bicho, 1999
- L'Animal a L'Esquena, 2000
- Canción para Stantiago, 2001
- Canción de Paula, 2001
- Atrás los Ojos, 2002
- An (el silencio), 2003
- Bach, 2004
- On a Remplacé les Coqs, 2004
- Atlas (o antes de llegar a Barataria), 2005
- Testimoni de Llops, 2006
- He Visto Caballos, 2008
- All the Names, 2010
