= Soleils =

- Directed by: Olivier Delahaye; Dani Kouyaté
- Story by: Olivier Delahaye
- Production companies: Odelion Films; Centre National de la Cinématographie; Sahélis Productions
- Release date: 2013
- Running time: 96 minutes
- Countries: France, Burkina Faso
- Language: French

Soleils is a 2013 French-Burkinabé road movie about the way in which the history of Africa has been written, especially in relationship to European colonialism.

== Cast ==
- Binda Ngazolo as Sotigui
- Nina Melo as Dokamisa
- Joseph Traoré as Sundjata Keita
- Mamadou Tindano as Jean-Pierre Guingané
- Barou Oumar Ouedraogo as Sangoué Lamizana
- Ibrahim Ouedraogo as Mokutu
- Rufus as Voltaire
- Albert Delpy as The printer
