= Baryshnikov Arts Center =

Arts complex in New York City

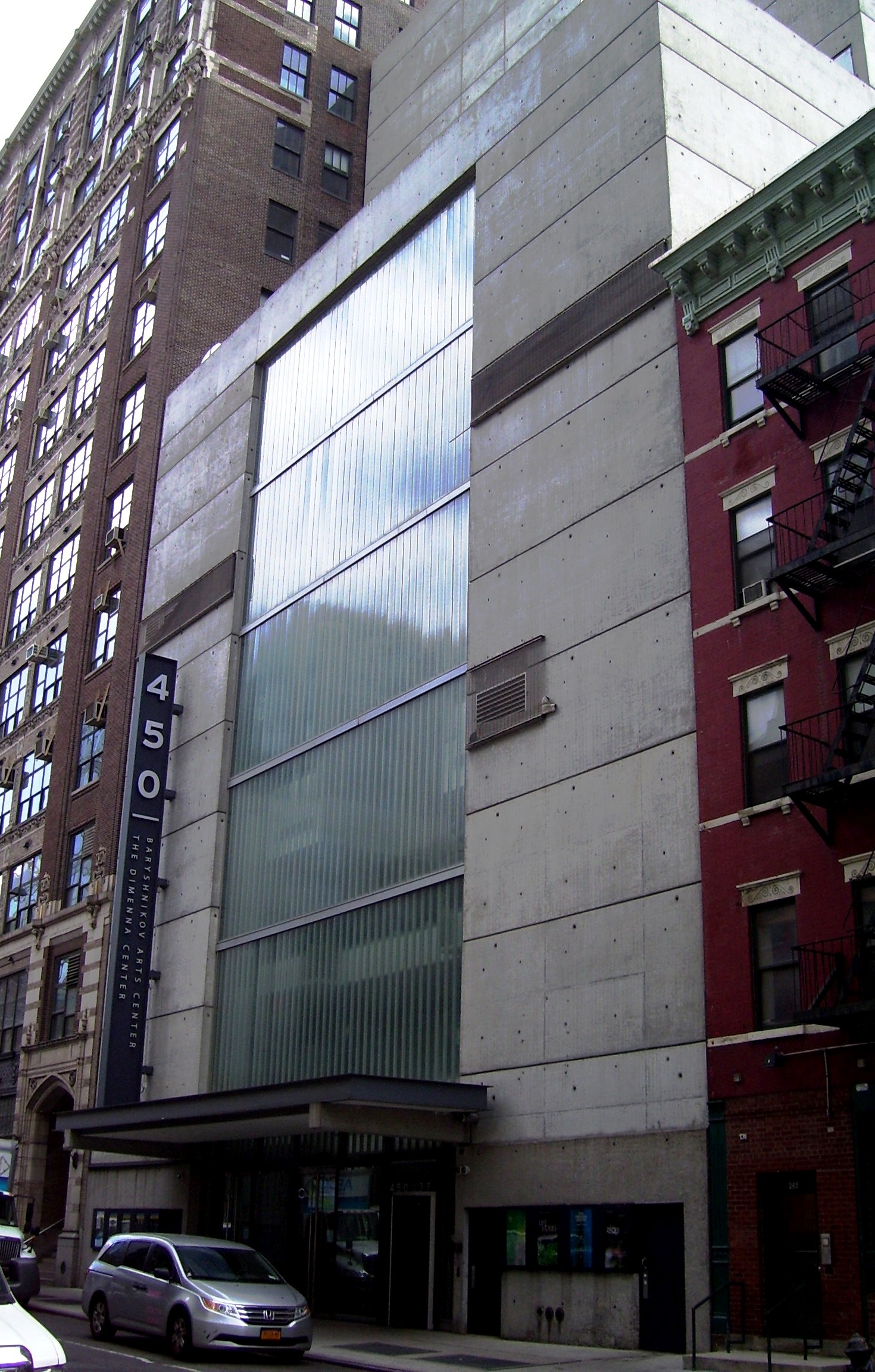
- Interactive map of Baryshnikov Arts Center
- Address: 450 West 37th Street
- Location: New York City
- Coordinates: 40.756044°N 73.997363°W
- Capacity: Jerome Robbins Theater: 238; Howard Gilman Performance Space: 136
- Public transit: New York City Subway: 34th Street – Penn Station ( trains); New York City Bus: M11, M34 SBS, M34A SBS; Commuter/long-distance rail: New York Penn Station

Construction
- Built: 2001–2005
- Opened: 2005

Website
- bacnyc.org

The Baryshnikov Arts Center (BAC) is a foundation and arts complex opened by Mikhail Baryshnikov in 2005 at 450 West 37th Street between Ninth and Tenth Avenues in the Hell's Kitchen neighborhood of Manhattan, New York City. The top three floors of the complex are occupied by the Baryshnikov Arts Center, which provides space and production facilities for dance, music, theater, film, and visual arts. The building also houses the Orchestra of St. Luke's DiMenna Center for Classical Music.

== History ==
The building is a 50,000 square feet (4,600 m^{2}) complex which includes three theater spaces. Ground was broken on the complex, then known as 37 Arts Theatre, as a commercial venture in July 2001. The first artist in residence with the BAC was Aszure Barton in May 2005, and the administrative offices opened in November 2005. The 37 Arts Theatre was launched in 2005 with the Off-Broadway revival of Hurlyburly starring Ethan Hawke and Parker Posey, followed by In The Heights and Fela!, prior to their successful Broadway runs. Since then, the complex has presented artists including Laurie Anderson, Tere O'Connor, Molly Davies, William Forsythe, Lucy Guerin, Foofwa d'Imobilité, Toni Morrison, Benjamin Millepied, Richard Move, Maria Pagès, Mal Pelo, Lou Reed, Pierre Rigal, Meg Stuart and Donna Uchizono.

BAC provides space, time, and support for artists to present their work. The center also encourages collaboration and multimedia events. The first fellowships were awarded in the summer of 2005. In 2007 and 2008, BAC and the Orchestra of St. Luke's together purchased and began renovation of the 37 Arts Theatre. Theater C re-opened in February 2010 as the Jerome Robbins Theater. In 2011, The Orchestra of St. Luke's re-opened Theaters A and B as the DiMenna Center for Classical Music.

== Gallery ==
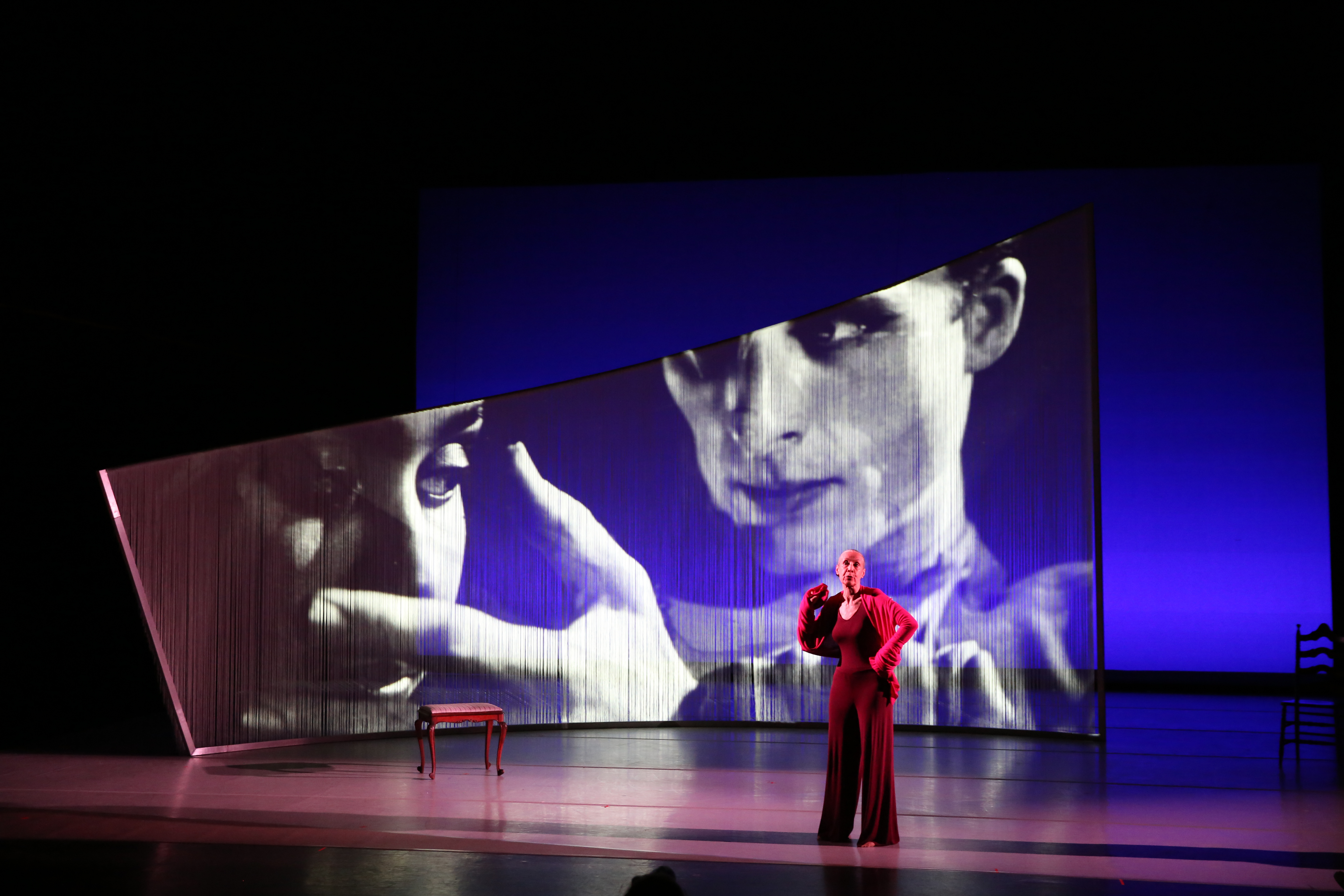
Carmen de Lavallade

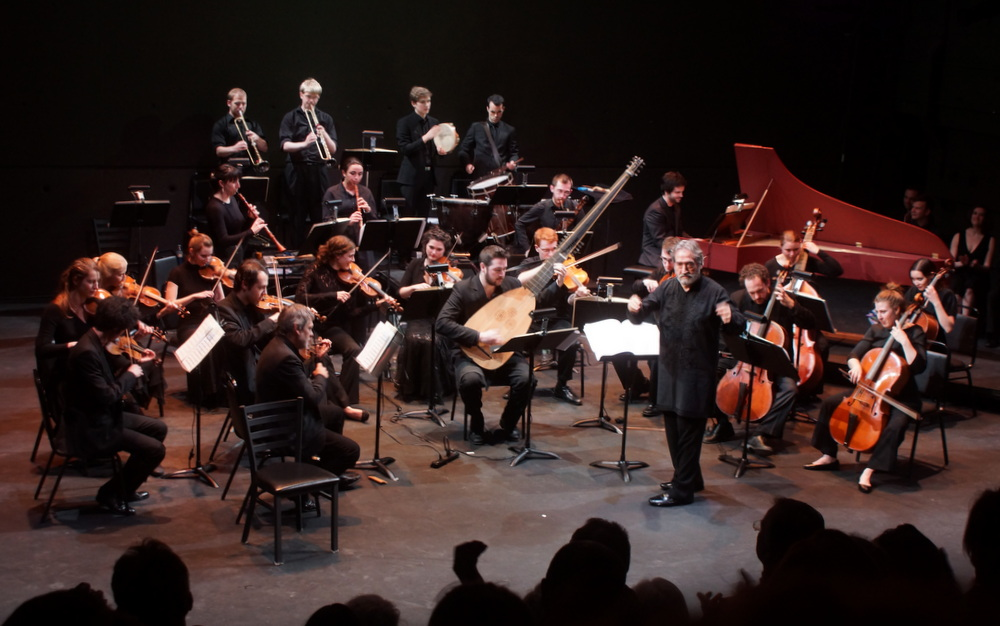
Jordi Savall and Juilliard 415

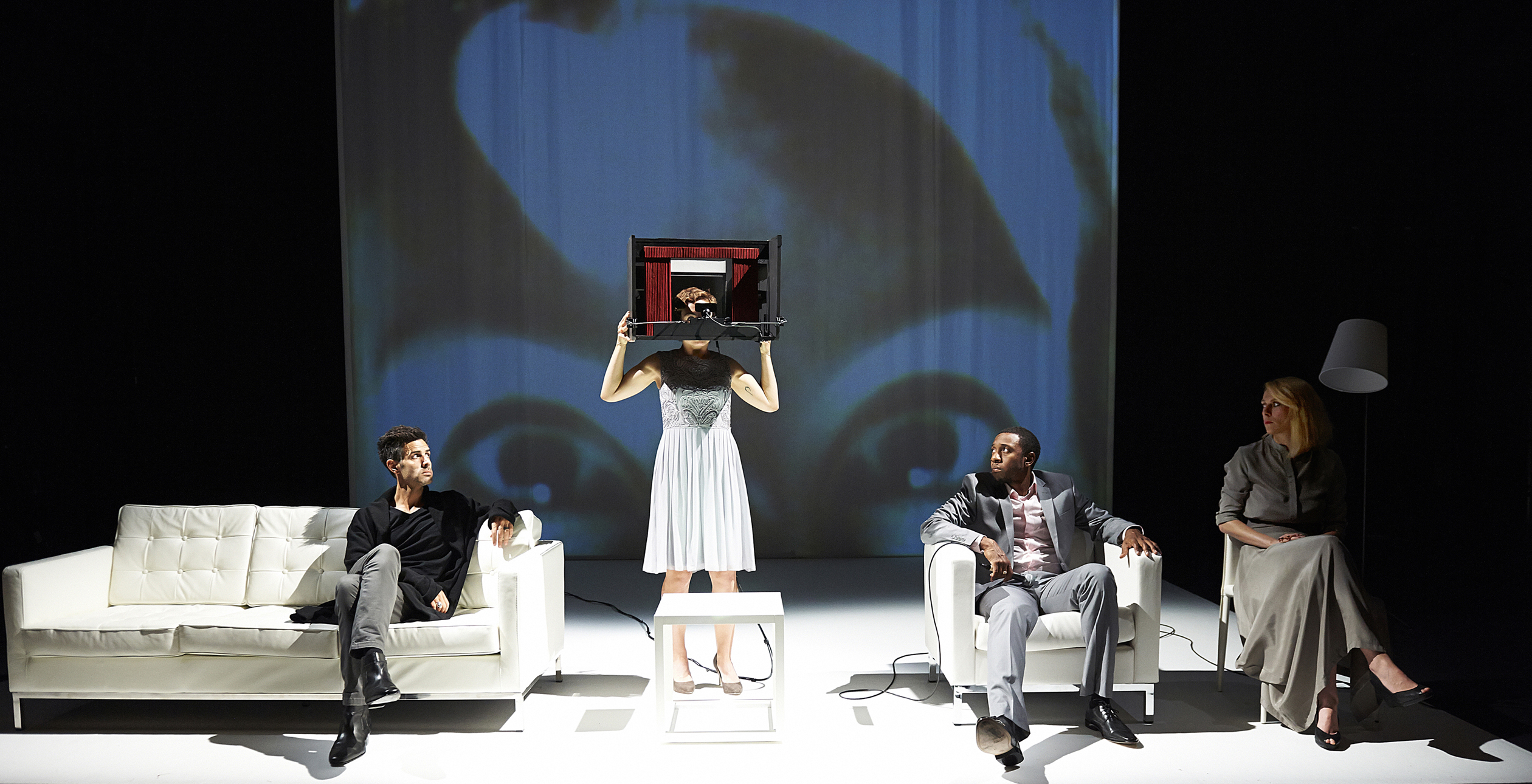
Scene from ILLUSIONS
