= Laurent Salgues =

French filmmaker (born 1967)

- Born: September 13, 1967 (age 58)
- Occupation: Filmmaker
- Known for: Rêves de poussière

Laurent Salgues (born 13 September 1967) is a French filmmaker.

Laurent Salgues was born on 13 September 1967. He attended the École Supérieure d'Audiovisuel (ESAV) in Toulouse, where he obtained a master's degree in audiovisual studies. He went on to the Conservatoire Européen d'Ecriture Audiovisuelle (CEEA) and the University of California, Los Angeles (UCLA) for further studies in screenplay writing. Between 1992 and 1996 he directed three short movies: Eternité moins cinq, Camilio and La femme à l'ombrelle. He has written screenplays for television and film since 2003.

His first full-length feature film was Rêves de poussière (Dreams of Dust - 2007). The film was a France and Canada co-production between Athénaïse – Sophie Salbot and Corporation ACPAV inc. – Marc Daigle. The associate producer was Sékou Traoré of the Burkina Faso company Sahelis Productions. Rêves de poussière tells of Mocktar Dicko, a Nigerien peasant, who goes to look for work in a gold mine in northeastern Burkina Faso. He hopes to forget the past in this prison, where the bars are made of dust and wind. A reviewer says the "opening shot reminds you of a choreographed musical—only there is no music, only silence and the sounds of workers’ tools". Another critic says "Cinematographed by Crystel Fournier, images are hauntingly dreamlike. Wind-swept dust is a recurrent motif".

== Filmographie ==
- CODIS 46 (1992), documentaire (8'), vidéo, couleur
- Éternité moins cinq (1992), fiction (6'), vidéo, couleur
- Camilio (1993), fiction (5'), 16mm
- La Femme à l'ombrelle (1996), docufiction (13'), vidéo, NB et couleur
- Rêves de poussière (2007)
