= Keïta! l'Héritage du griot =

- Directed by: Dani Kouyaté
- Written by: Dani Kouyaté
- Produced by: Sahelis Productions
- Starring: Sotigui Kouyaté
- Release date: 1995
- Running time: 94 minutes
- Country: Burkina Faso
- Languages: Djula, French

Keïta! l'Héritage du griot (English title: Keita! Voice of the Griot) is a 1995 Burkinabé film directed by Dani Kouyaté and starring Sotigui Kouyaté. It is an adaptation of the first third of the 13th-century Epic of Sundiata, interspersed with scenes of a griot telling the story to a young child.

== Plot ==
Keïta follows Mabo Keïta (Dicko), A 13-year-old boy who lives in a bourgeois family in Ouagadougou and attends a good school. He meets Djeliba Kouyate, a griot who wants to tell the young Keita the origin of his name and how it's related to Sundiata Keita, the founder of the Mali Empire. Kouyate begins his history with the myth of Mandé creation As all living beings gather on the newly formed Earth a person declares to the masses that he wants to be their king. The old griot tells how Keita’s family descended from the buffalo, the blackbirds still look at him, and how people have roots that lie at the bottom of the earth.

== Cast ==
- Seydou Boro as Sundjata Keita
- Hamed Dicko as Mabo Keïta
- Abdoulaye Komboudri as Drissa Fafana
- Sotigui Kouyaté as Djeliba Kouyate; Sotigui Kouyaté is the father of the director of the film, Dani Kouyaté
- Claire Sanon as Sitan
- Blandine Yaméogo as Sogolon

== Production ==
Dani Kouyaté directed a number of short films before the release of Keïta, his first full-length feature. The film's working title was Keita: From Mouth to Ear. It was shot in the towns of Ouagadougou, Sindou, and Ouahabou. The assistant director was Alidou Badini.

== Reception ==
Keïta! received the Best First Film Prize from the Panafrican Film and Television Festival of Ouagadougou (Fespaco) and was awarded the Junior Prize at the Cannes Film Festival. The New York Times praised the film, claiming it "succeeds admirably in keeping... history alive." In a 1995 interview, Kouyate reflected on the experience and commenting on traditional society, saying:

Sometimes when you don't know where you're heading, you have to return to where you came from in order to think things over before continuing your journey. Today, with all the things happening to her, Africa has trouble finding which direction to take—modernity, tradition, or some other road. We are not really capable of digesting all these things. We don't know who we are, and we don't know where we are going. We are between two things. Between our traditions and our modernity.
