= Alidou Badini =

Burkino Faso filmmaker

- Born: Burkino Faso
- Citizenship: Burkina Faso
- Occupation: Filmmaker
- Known for: Le Beurre et l'argent du beurre

Alidou Badini is a filmmaker from Burkina Faso who has worked on many films and TV productions. He co-directed the widely discussed Le Beurre et l'argent du beurre, which documents the realities of free trade.

== Career ==
Badini has been cameraman or assistant director on various films for the cinema and TV, starting with Keïta! l'Héritage du griot (1994) directed by Dani Kouyaté. His short film Fleurs d'épines (Flowers of thorns) was nominated for a prize at the Panafrican Film and Television Festival of Ouagadougou in 2001.

Badini was co-director of Le Beurre et l'argent du beurre, which explores the trade in shea butter made from the nuts of the shea tree, a source of cash to subsistence farmers in Burkina Faso. The almonds and the butter extracted from the nuts are used in cooking and body care. Although attempts have been made to apply "fair trade" principles, the film questions whether the villagers can in practice escape the implacable force of the market. Le Beurre et l'argent du beurre was shown at the Amiens International Film Festival. The film received the Jury Grand Prize at the International Environmental Film Festival of Niamey. It has been used as the basis for discussions by groups who support fair trade.

== Filmography ==
Year	Title	Role	Notes
1994	Keïta! l'Héritage du griot (Keita's griot heritage)	Assistant Director	Dani Kouyaté. Fiction. 90 minutes
1995	Les enfants du soleil (Children of the Sun)	Assistant Director	Issiaka Konate . 26 minutes fiction
1995	Mare d'Ourcy, Merveille du Burkina (Mare Ourcy, Burkina Wonder)	Assistant Director	TV by Lacina Ouedraogo, 15min Documentary,
1995	Protection du cours d'eau du Mouhoun (Protection of the Black Volta river)	Assistant Director	TV of Lacina Ouedraogo, 26 min documentary,
1995	Yaango, l'émigratio (Yaango, emigration)	Assistant Director	TV of Adama Roamba, Fiction 26 minutes
1995	Voyage à Ouaga (Journey to Ouaga)'	Assistant Director	Camille Mouyéké. Fiction, 15 min.
1995	Si longue que soit la nuit (However long the night is)	Assistant Director	Guy Désiré Yaméogo Fiction 24 minutes
1998	Faire face (Coping)	Assistant Director	TV Guy Désiré Yameogo, Fiction 26 minutes
1999	Boutons la polio	Camera	Director: Issiaka Ouedraogo, Fiction 26 minutes
2000	Le poisson	Camera	Director: Sénéfa Coulibaly, Documentary, 26 minutes
2000	Le gingembre	Camera	Director: Arsène Kafando, Documentary, 15 minutes
2001	INA	Camera	Director: Issa Traore de Brahima, Fiction 26 minutes
2001	Fleurs d'épines (Flowers of thorns)	Director	Fiction 26 minutes, Official selection in competition at FESPACO in Ouagadougou in February 2001. Sahelis Productions
2002	Source d'histoires (Source of stories)	Assistant Director	Adama Roamba, Fiction 26 minutes
2004	Wande	Camera	Director: Rédo Porgo, Documentary, 26 minutes
2004	Le nouveau royaume d’Abou	Camera	Series of 20 episodes
2004	Rencontre en Ligne (Online Dating)	Assistant Director	Adama Roamba, Fiction, 15 minutes
2005	Du venin dans la soupe (Venom in the soup)		Sahelis Productions Special mention at International Environmental Film Festival of Niamey.
2007	Le Beurre et l'argent du beurre (Butter and Butter Money)	Co-director	With Philippe Baqué. Sahelis Productions
