= France-Brésil et autres histoires =

- Directed by: Marc Picavez
- Screenplay by: Marc Picavez
- Produced by: Association Makiz’Art, TOBINA Film
- Starring: Solène Sainte-Rose, Ibrahima Mbaye
- Cinematography: Vincent Pouplard, Céline Lixon, Denis Mareau
- Edited by: Éloi Brignaudy
- Music by: Belikomi
- Release date: 2007
- Running time: 12 minutes
- Country: France

France-Brésil et autres histoires is a 2007 film.

== Synopsis ==
On July 1, 2006, during the Soccer World Cup, an illegal immigrant is detained and deported with his daughter, strongly contrasting with the glorification of a united and multicoloured France.

== Awards ==
- Film de Quartier de Dakar 2007
