= Idrissa Ouédraogo =

Burkinabé filmmaker (1954–2018)

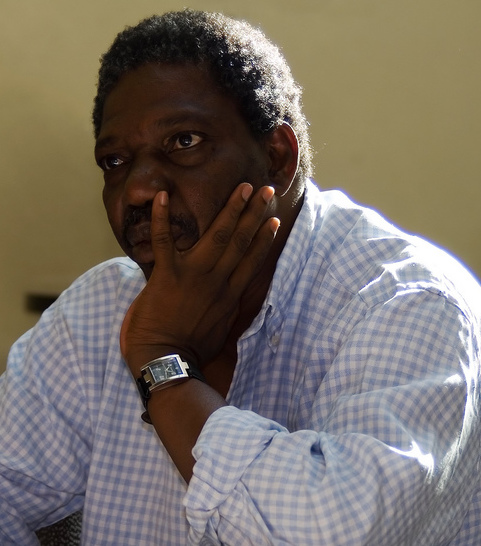
- Ouédraogo in 2007
- Born: 21 January 1954; Banfora, Upper Volta
- Died: 18 February 2018 (aged 64); Ouagadougou, Burkina Faso
- Education: Institut des hautes études cinématographiques
- Occupations: Film director; screenwriter; producer
- Years active: 1970s–2018
- Notable work: Yam Daabo

Idrissa Ouédraogo (21 January 1954 – 18 February 2018) was a Burkinabé filmmaker. His work explored the conflict between rural and city life and tradition and modernity in his native Burkina Faso and elsewhere in West Africa.

He is most known for his drama film Tilaï (1990), which won the Grand Prix at the 43rd Cannes Film Festival. For Samba Traoré (1993), he won the Silver Bear at the 43rd Berlin International Film Festival.

== Early life ==
Idrissa Ouédraogo was born in Banfora, Upper Volta (now Burkina Faso), in 1954. He grew up in the town of Ouahigouya in the northern region of his homeland, and in 1976 he was awarded a Bachelor of Arts degree. To ensure a better life his farmer parents sent him to Ouagadougou for further education, where he attended the African Institute for Cinema Studies (Institut Africain d’Etudes Cinématographiques) completing his studies in 1981 with a masters. After studying in Kiev in the USSR he moved to Paris, where he graduated from the Institut des hautes études cinématographiques (IDHEC) in 1985 with a DEA from the Sorbonne.

== Early career ==
On graduating from IAFEC in 1981, Ouédraogo set up his own independent film company, "The Future of Films", which became "Les Films de la Plaine". In 1981, before moving to Kiev, he worked for the Burkina Faso Directorate of Cinema Production (Direction de la Production Cinématographique du Burkina Faso), where he directed several short films.

In his earliest short, Pourquoi (1981), a man dreams of killing his wife, but is unsure if it is a dream or reality. Ouédraogo followed this with another short film, Poko (1981), which won the short film prize at that year's Panafrican Film and Television Festival of Ouagadougou (FESPACO). Poko follows a young pregnant woman who dies after failing to reach medical facilities whilst being transported on a cart. The film highlighted the fact that despite paying their taxes, the poor gain little real help in day-to-day necessities from the government. This was followed by the shorts Les Écuelles ("The Platters"; 1983), Les Funérailles du Larle Naba, ("Larle Naba's Funeral"; 1984), Ouagadougou, Ouaga deux roues ("Ouagadougou, Ouaga Two Wheels"; 1985) and Issa le tisserand ("Issa the Weaver"; 1985). His last short was Tenga (1985), which explores a villager who after moving to the city, returns to his hometown. In these shorts Ouédraogo explores themes and film techniques that he would return to in his future feature films.

== Feature films ==
Ouédraogo's first feature, Yam Daabo ("The Choice"; 1986) was well received, and focuses on a rural family's decision to remain reliant on aid or to move location and become self-sufficient. His first film to receive greater distribution was Yaaba ("Grandmother"), which won awards at festivals, including the FIPRESCI Prize at Cannes, and was shown around the world, popular because of its beauty and simplicity. Despite its popularity, critics felt the Yaaba lacked the critical insight into the serious issues that affected village life.

His next film Tilaï ("A Question of Honour") won the Grand Prix at the 1990 Cannes Film Festival. Centered around a moment of change in the Mòoré culture, where the lives of the children of a family are torn apart by the unwavering adherence to tradition in a rapidly transforming modern world. The success of both Yam Daabo and Tilaï placed pressure on Ouédraogo to produce another international success, and his next film Karim and Sala was rushed to be shown at the 12th Panafrican Film and Television Festival of Ouagadougou (FESPACO) and was not well received and suffered from poor distribution. Samba Traoré (1993), returns to the themes of rural versus city life, tradition against change and was well received, being nominated for the Silver Bear at the 43rd Berlin International Film Festival. Ouédraogo followed Samba Traoré with The Heart's Cry (Le Cri du cœur; 1994), Kini and Adams (1997), Anger of the Gods (La Colère des dieux; 2003) and Kato Kato (2006).

Ouédraogo's output has been criticised as being too focused on appealing to audiences in Africa and the West. Françoise Pfaff names Ouédraogo, amongst a group of African directors, as a storyteller who has a predilection for filming shots of atypical African rural scenes, such as "monotonous images of women pounding millet or corn". Pfaff's view is that Ouédraogo's work is too focused on non-African audiences and alienates African viewers. In defence, Sharon A. Russell argues that Ouédraogo must always consider the needs of a director who wishes to keep filming in Africa, and that funding for the next film is a priority and that he is a talented person making films under difficult circumstances.

== Later life and death ==
In February 2015, Ouédraogo announced shortly before the opening of the 24th Panafrican Film and Television Festival of Ouagadougou (FESPACO) his desire to direct "an important film" on foreign colonization of the African continent, the anti-colonial struggle and the leading figures of that movement. During a March 2015 interview with Le Monde, Ouédraogo underlined what he believed to be three issues facing the film industry of Burkina Faso. Among those issues are the lack of sufficient knowledge and professionalism when it comes to cinematography. Funding shortages and the absence of a demanding local market are the two other problems he mentioned. During his last few years, Ouédraogo's relatives noted his disappointment in modern African cinema due to what he considered to be deficiency in talent and in means of production.

At around 5:30 a.m. GMT on 18 February 2018, Ouédraogo died at the Bois clinic in Ouagadougou at the age of 64 as a result of an unspecified "illness", according to a statement by the UNCB (Union nationale des cinéastes du Burkina). Shortly after his death, Burkinabé president Roch Marc Christian Kaboré said that his country "had lost a filmmaker of immense talent". On 20 February, he was buried at the Gounghin Cemetery. On its way there, the funeral procession stopped by the Monument of African Filmmakers at the Place des Cinéastes, close to the Ouagadougou City Hall, where he was commemorated by the city's mayor. The convoy then stopped in front of the gate of the FESPACO. Politicians, religious figures and artists were present at the procession, where he was given a military funeral.

== Filmography ==
=== Shorts ===
Release year	Title
1981	Pourquoi? (Why?)
1981	Poko
1983	Les Écuelles (The Platters)
1983	Les funérailles du Larle Naba (Larle Naba's Funeral)
1984	Ouagadougou, Ouaga deux roues (Ouagadougou, Ouaga Two Wheels)
1984	Issa le Tisserand (Issa the Weaver)
1985	Tenga
1991	Obi
1994	Afrique, mon Afrique (Africa, My Africa)
1996	Samba et Leuk le lièvra (Samba and Leuk the Rabbit)
1994	Gorki
1997	Les parias du cinéma (The Outcasts of Cinema)
2001	Scénarios du Sahel

=== Films ===
Release year	Title
1987	Yam Daabo (The Choice)
1989	Yaaba (Grandmother)
1990	Tilaï (The Law)
1991	Karim and Sala
1993	Samba Traoré
1994	Le cri du cœur (The Heart's Cry)
1997	Kini and Adams
2003	La colère des dieux (Anger of the Gods)
2006	Kato Kato

=== Television series ===
- Entre l'arbre et l'ecorce (1999)
- Kadi Jolie (2001)

=== Segments ===
- Lumière and Company (1995)
- 11'09"01 September 11 (2002)

== See also ==
- Cinema of Burkina Faso
