= Issa le Tisserand =

- Directed by: Idrissa Ouedraogo
- Produced by: Mario Gariazzo, Les Films de l'Avenir Ministère de la Coopération (Francia), Direction du Cinéma du Burkina Faso
- Starring: Ernest Ouedraogo, Assétou Sanfo
- Cinematography: Sékou Ouedraogo
- Edited by: Arnaud Blin, Christine Delorme
- Music by: Moustapha Thiombiano
- Release date: 1985
- Running time: 20 minutes
- Countries: Burkina Faso; France

Issa le Tisserand (in English: Issa the weaver) is a 1985 Burkinabé film directed by Idrissa Ouedraogo. The film was awarded as the best documentary at the ninth Panafrican Film and Television Festival of Ouagadougou (FESPACO).

== Synopsis ==
Issa is a traditional weaver in Burkina Faso who loves his trade. However, so as not to lose his clientele and continue making enough to keep his wife, Issa finds himself forced to sell Western clothes. He buys a mask and ready-to-wear clothing and proceeds to make a fortune.

Shot in 1984, a year after Thomas Sankara’s rise to power, the film illustrates the Chief of State’s motto: "Let’s use products from Burkina Faso!" and portraits the disappearance of indigenous craft due to westernization.
