= Ibrahima Mbaye =

Senegalese footballer

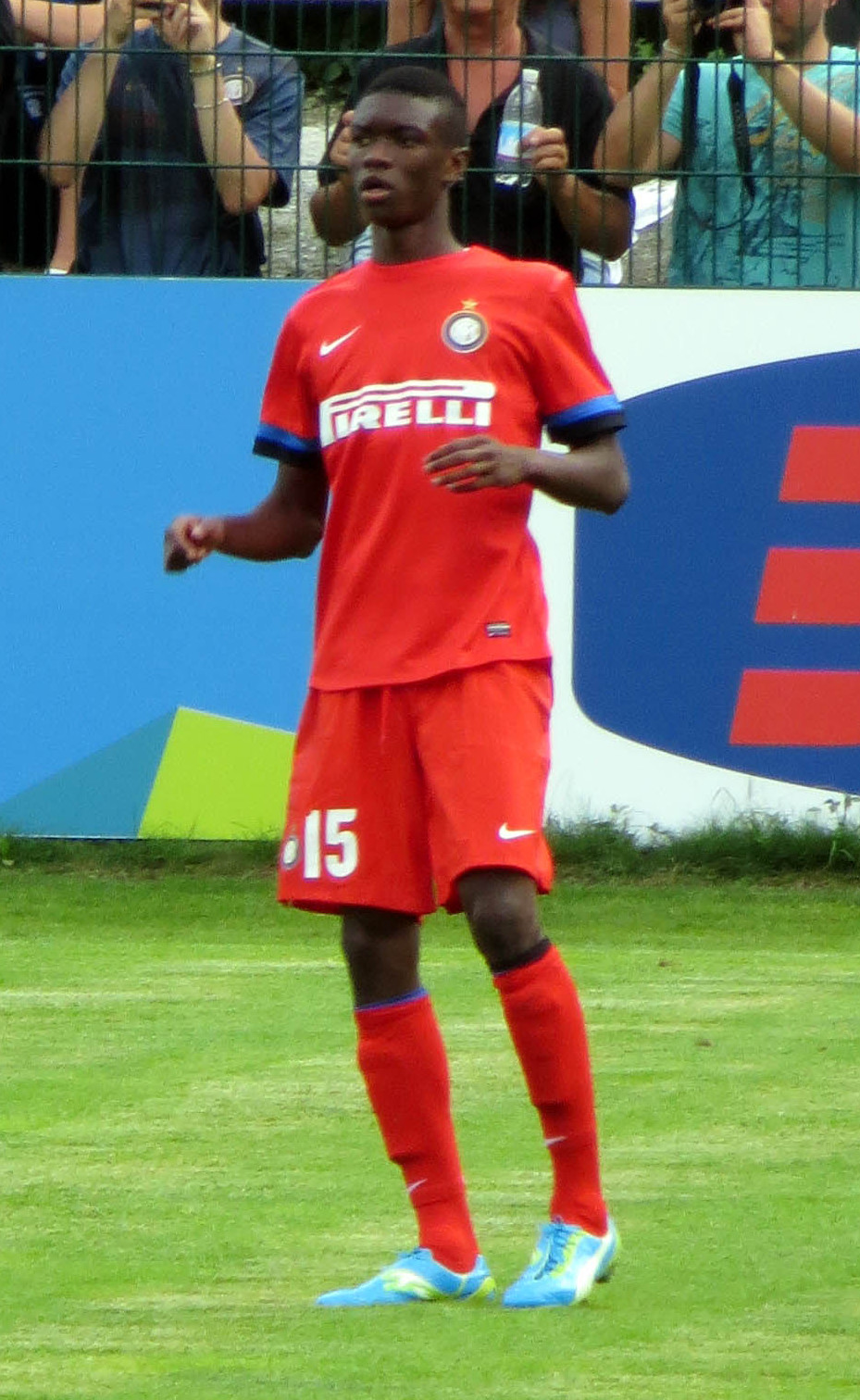
- Mbaye in action with Inter Milan in 2012

Personal information
- Date of birth: 19 November 1994 (age 31)
- Place of birth: Guédiawaye, Senegal
- Height: 1.88 m (6 ft 2 in)
- Position: Right-back

Youth career
- 2006–2010: Étoile Lusitana
- 2010–2013: Inter Milan

Senior career*
Years	Team	Apps	(Gls)
2012–2015	Inter Milan	4	(0)
2013–2014	→ Livorno (loan)	25	(2)
2015	→ Bologna (loan)	8	(1)
2015–2022	Bologna	113	(4)
2022–2023	CFR Cluj	0	(0)
2025–2026	Team Altamura	20	(0)

International career^{‡}
2013	Senegal U20	6	(0)
2016–	Senegal	8	(0)
Medal record
Men's football
Representing Senegal
Africa Cup of Nations
Winner	2021 Cameroon
- * Club domestic league appearances and goals as of 1 May 2026 ‡ National team caps and goals as of 25 January 2022

Ibrahima Mbaye (born 19 November 1994) is a Senegalese professional footballer who plays as a right-back.

== Club career ==
Mbaye was born in Guédiawaye, a suburb of Dakar, Senegal. He joined youth football academy Étoile Lusitana before being signed by Italian club Internazionale in summer 2010. Mbaye formally joined Inter in January 2011 following his 16th birthday and entered the Inter U17 youth squad. In 2011–12, Mbaye was promoted to Inter Primavera, the club's reserve team coached by Andrea Stramaccioni. The primavera team won the 2011–12 NextGen Series under Stramaccioni and the league under Daniele Bernazzani, after Stramaccioni was promoted to first team coach. Stramaccioni then promoted Mbaye to the first team on 28 April 2012. However, the footballer was initially excluded from the team line-up, including the bench.

In July 2012, Stramaccioni named Mbaye in Inter's pre-season training camp. The squad consisted of 26 players who were not involved in the UEFA Euro 2012 tournament. Mbaye played in pre-season friendlies, winning the 2012 TIM Trophy. On 27 July 2012, Mbaye was named in List B—Inter's main squad for 2012–13 UEFA Europa League—as he was not yet eligible for List A. Mbaye made his debut in the return leg of the third qualifying round after Inter had defeated Hajduk Split 3–0 away. Yuto Nagatomo was rested and Mbaye occupied the left-back position. However, in September, Mbaye was dropped from the squad for the group stage as there was no room for him in the quota of 17 foreign players.

A few weeks after his 18th birthday, Mbaye signed a new contract with Inter.

On 23 January 2015, Mbaye was signed on loan by Bologna until the end of the season, with obligation to buy set at €3 million, depending on whether or not the club was promoted to Serie A next season. Bologna was promoted to Serie A at the end of the season, with Mbaye playing a significant role in returning the club to the Italian top league. He was offered a contract to stay permanently at Bologna, leaving Inter Milan after more than five years.

On 1 September 2022, his contract with Bologna was terminated by mutual consent.

On 26 July 2025, Mbaye signed for Serie C club Team Altamura.

== International career ==
Mbaye made his international debut in October 2014 during the 2015 Africa Cup of Nations qualifiers. He was called up by head coach Alain Giresse for the game against Tunisia in Dakar. He was then re-called for the return leg game in Tunis, where Senegal lost 1–0 despite dominating the game. Mbaye earned his third international cap a few weeks later when Senegal faced Egypt in Cairo. They won the game 1–0 and Senegal qualified to the 2015 Africa Cup of Nations competition with one game against Malawi left to play, in which Mbaye also featured In total, he has earned four international caps with the Lions of Teranga and is the youngest Senegalese player to ever wear the national jersey.

He was part of Senegal's squad for the 2021 Africa Cup of Nations; the Lions of Teranga went on to win the tournament for the first time in their history.

Mbaye was appointed a Grand Officer of the National Order of the Lion by President of Senegal Macky Sall following the nation's victory at the tournament. He starred in the 2007 documentary France-Brésil et autres histoires.

== Personal life ==
Born in Senegal, Mbaye arrived in Italy as a teenager, being successively formally adopted in 2015 by his agent Giuseppe Accardi. He successively requested Italian citizenship, which is set to be granted to him in December 2024.

== Career statistics ==
=== Club ===
As of match played 21 May 2022

Appearances and goals by club, season and competition
Club	Season	League			Cup		Europe		Other		Total	
Club	Season	Division	Apps	Goals	Apps	Goals	Apps	Goals	Apps	Goals	Apps	Goals
Inter Milan	2012–13	Serie A	0	0	0	0	2	0	–		2	0
Inter Milan	2014–15	Serie A	4	0	0	0	3	0	–		7	0
Inter Milan	Total		4	0	0	0	5	0	0	0	9	0
Livorno (loan)	2013–14	Serie A	25	2	0	0	–		–		25	2
Bologna	2014–15	Serie B	8	1	0	0	–		3	0	11	1
Bologna	2015–16	Serie A	15	0	1	0	–		–		16	0
Bologna	2016–17	Serie A	16	0	1	0	–		–		17	0
Bologna	2017–18	Serie A	25	1	0	0	–		–		25	1
Bologna	2018–19	Serie A	23	2	2	0	–		–		25	2
Bologna	2019–20	Serie A	20	0	1	0	–		–		21	0
Bologna	2020–21	Serie A	8	1	1	0	–		–		9	1
Bologna	2021–22	Serie A	6	0	1	0	–		–		7	0
Bologna	Total		121	5	7	0	0	0	3	0	131	5
CFR Cluj	2022–23	Liga I	0	0	0	0	0	0	–		0	0
Career total			150	7	7	0	5	0	3	0	165	7

=== International ===
As of matches played on 25 January 2022

Appearances and goals by national team and year
National team	Year	Apps	Goals
Senegal	2016	1	0
Senegal	2017	0	0
Senegal	2018	2	0
Senegal	2019	0	0
Senegal	2020	0	0
Senegal	2021	2	0
Senegal	2022	3	0
Total		8	0

== Honours ==
Senegal U20

- Jeux de la Francophonie bronze medalist: 2013

Senegal

- Africa Cup of Nations: 2021

Individual

- Grand Officer of the National Order of the Lion: 2022
