= Tiga guérisseur =

2001 short film directed by Rasmane Tiendrebeogo

- Directed by: Rasmane Tiendrebeogo
- Screenplay by: Rasmane Tiendrebeogo, Patrick Theunen
- Produced by: Atelier Graphoui
- Cinematography: Patrick Theunen
- Edited by: Patrick Theunen
- Music by: Foofango
- Release date: 2001
- Running time: 6 minutes
- Countries: Belgium; Burkina Faso

Tiga guérisseur (Tiga the Healer is a 2001 Burkinabé animation film.

== Synopsis ==
Tiga is in his thirties and tries out different jobs but finds them to be too exhausting or grubby. He has the idea of becoming a healer. Certain that he will become rich easily, Tiga invents his own magic potions. All goes well until the day a suspicious woman makes him drink his own potion first.

== Reception ==
The film has been considered part of the renewal of animation film in Burkina Faso.
