= Sia, The Dream of the Python =

2001 film by Dani Kouyaté

Sia, the Dream of the Python
- French: Sia, le rêve du python
- Directed by: Dani Kouyaté
- Written by: Dani Kouyaté; Moussa Diagana
- Produced by: Claude Gilaizeau; Elisabeth Lopez; Sylvie Maigne; Sekou Traore; Sahelis Productions
- Starring: Fatoumata Diawara; Sotigui Kouyaté; Habib Dembélé
- Cinematography: Robert Millié
- Edited by: Zoé Durouchoux
- Music by: Daniel Rousseau; Fanny Touré
- Distributed by: ArtMattan Productions
- Release date: 24 May 2002 (U.S.)
- Running time: 96 minutes
- Country: Burkina Faso
- Language: Bambara

Sia, The Dream of the Python (French: Sia, le rêve du python) is a 2001 film by Burkina Faso-based filmmaker Dani Kouyaté.

== Plot ==
Kaya Maghan, the despotic king of Wagadou (Kardigué Laïco Traoré), follows the instructions of his priest by ordering the religious sacrifice to the Python God of Sia Yatabaree (Fatoumata Diawara), the daughter of the commander-in-chief Wakhané (Sotigui Kouyaté). A gift of gold equivalent to Sia’s weight is given to her family as compensation for surrendering their daughter for the sacrifice. However, Sia runs away and finds shelter in the home of Kerfa (Hamadoun Kassogué), a mad prophet who has railed against the king. The king orders his top general to locate Sia, but the general is conflicted since Sia was engaged to marry his nephew, Mamadi (Ibrahim Baba Cissé), who is in battle on behalf of the kingdom. Mamadi returns and joins his uncle to do battle against the Python God. With the help of Balla, a griot (Habib Dembélé), Mamadi accedes to the throne.

== Production and release ==
The inspiration of Sia, le rêve du python is a seventh-century myth of the Wagadu people of Western Africa, which was adapted into the play La légende du Wagudu vue par Sia Yatabéré by Mauritanian writer Moussa Diagana. He also adapted the screenplay with filmmaker Dani Kouyaté.

Sia, le rêve du python played at the 2001 Panafrican Film and Television Festival of Ouagadougou (FESPACO), where it won the Special Jury Prize for a Feature Film.

In May 2002, the film had its U.S. theatrical premiere. Critical reaction was mostly positive. Dave Kehr, in The New York Times, praised Kouyate’s directing style as giving the film “a certain timeless quality,” though he noted its “measured pace and lack of dramatic inflection can also seem tedious.” Wilson Morales, writing for BlackFilm.com, praised the film’s technical aspects, stating that the film "is visually stunning, as its costumes and settings capture the essence of what Africa looked like in ancient times." Elizabeth Zimmer of the Village Voice praised the timeless nature of the film’s plot, observing that "the subtitled costume drama is set in a remote African empire before cell phones, guns, and the internal combustion engine, but the politics that thump through it are as timely as tomorrow."

Sia, le rêve du python was released in the U.S. on DVD in 2007 as a double-feature with another Burkinabé film, Tasuma, The Fighter.
