= Rêves de poussière =

- Directed by: Laurent Salgues
- Written by: Laurent Salgues
- Produced by: Sophie Salbot; Marc Daigle
- Starring: Makena Diop; Rasmane Ouedraogo; Adama Ouédraogo
- Cinematography: Crystel Fournier
- Edited by: Annie Jean
- Music by: Jean Massicotte; Mathieu Vanasse
- Production companies: Sahelis Productions; Athénaïse; ACPAV
- Distributed by: Film Movement
- Release date: August 23, 2006 (Rencontres Cinéma de Gindou)
- Running time: 86 minutes
- Countries: Burkina Faso; Canada; France
- Language: French

Rêves de poussière (English: Dreams of Dust or Buried Dreams) is a 2006 film by director Laurent Salgues.

== Plot ==
Rêves de poussière tells of Mocktar Dicko, a Nigerien peasant, who goes to look for work in a gold mine in northeastern Burkina Faso. He hopes to forget the past in this prison, where the bars are made of dust and wind.

== Production ==
The film was the first full-length feature by Salges. The project quickly secured Avance sur Recettes and GAN Foundation funding, and gained further French and European funding since the director had obtained Burkina Faso citizenship through marriage. The film was a France-Canada co-production between Athénaïse – Sophie Salbot and ACPAV – Marc Daigle. The associate producer was Sékou Traoré of the Burkina Faso company Sahelis Productions.

== Reception ==
A reviewer says the "opening shot reminds you of a choreographed musical—only there is no music, only silence and the sounds of workers’ tools". Another critic says "Cinematographed by Crystel Fournier, images are hauntingly dreamlike. Wind-swept dust is a recurrent motif". The film was nominated for the grand Jury Prize at the Sundance Film Festival in the World Cinema - Dramatic category. It won prizes at Tarifa 2007, Amiens 2006 and Namur 2006.
