= Tilaï =

- VHS cover
- Directed by: Idrissa Ouédraogo
- Written by: Idrissa Ouédraogo; Elsa Monseigny
- Produced by: Idrissa Ouédraogo; Beatrice Korc; Silvia Voser
- Starring: Rasmane Ouedraogo; Ina Cisse; Roukietou Barry; Assane Ouedraogo
- Cinematography: Pierre-Laurent Chénieux; Jean Monsigny
- Edited by: Luc Barnier; Michael Klochendler
- Music by: Abdullah Ibrahim; David Williams; Billy Higgins
- Distributed by: Les Films De L'Avenir (Burkina Faso); New Yorker Films (United States); Waka Films (Switzerland); Rhea Films (France)
- Release dates: September 8, 1990 (premiere at Toronto Festival of Festivals); December 5, 1990 (France)
- Running time: 81 minutes
- Countries: Burkina Faso; Switzerland; France; West Germany; United Kingdom
- Language: Mossi (Mooré)

Tilaï ("The Law") is a 1990 award-winning Burkinabé drama film co-written, co-produced, and directed by Idrissa Ouédraogo. It premiered at the 1990 Toronto Festival of Festivals.

== Plot ==
Saga returns to his village after a long absence, and finds that his father has married Nogma, his fiancee, during his leave. Nogma has become his second wife, and by law, Saga's mother. Saga runs away and builds a straw hut near the village.

Still in love, Saga and Nogma begin an affair, with Nogma telling her parents she is going to visit her aunt, then running to Saga's hut. After the affair is discovered, Saga's father decrees that he must die for dishonoring the family. Nogma's father hangs himself from a tree, and Nogma is disowned by her mother at her father's funeral. Saga's brother Kougri is selected to execute Saga. He pretends to kill Saga so as to restore the family's honor.

Saga and Nogma then run away to another village, and the family falls apart. As Saga and Nogma begin to build a life, Nogma tells Saga that she is pregnant. Meanwhile, Kougri comes to regret his failure to kill Saga. After Saga's birth mother dies, Saga returns to the village, exposing Kougri's failure to carry out his father's orders. Kougri's father tells him he is banished. Kougri then picks up Saga's rifle and shoots him for having brought ruin to the family and his own life. He then walks off into exile and probable death.

== Cast ==
- Rasmane Ouedraogo as Saga
- Ina Cissé as Nogma
- Roukietou Barry as Kuilga
- Assane Ouedraogo as Kougri
- Sibidou Sidibe as Poko
- Moumouni Ouedraogo as Tenga
- Mariam Barry as Bore
- Seydou Ouédraogo as Nomenaba
- Mariam Ouedraogo as Koudpoko
- Daouda Porgo as Porgo
- Kogre Warma as Maiga
- Mamadou Ganame as Ganame
- Azeta Porgo as Azeta
- Noufou Ouédraogo as The child
- Salif Ouedraogo as The peddler
- Amade Ganame as Villager
- Issaka Porgo as Villager
- Moumouni Selinga as Villager
- Adma Sidibe as Villager
- Boureima Warma as Villager
- Fati Ouedraogo as Villager
- Madi Derme as Cavalier
- Amidou Ouedraogo as Cavalier

== Awards ==
Tilaï won the Jury Grand Prize at the 1990 Cannes Film Festival and the Grand Prize at the 1991 Panafrican Film and Television Festival of Ouagadougou.

== Bibliography ==
- Tilai (1990), Corndog Chats, 16 February 2013, Adam Kuhn, Access date: 9 May 2022
- A passion not to be denied, Reelingback, 28 February 2021, Michael Walsh (First publish: 28 June 1991), Access date: 9 May 2022
