= Kini and Adams =

- Directed by: Idrissa Ouedraogo
- Written by: Idrissa Ouedraogo; Santiago Amigorena; Olivier Lorelle
- Produced by: Idrissa Ouedraogo
- Starring: Vusi Kunene; David Mohloki
- Cinematography: Pierre-Laurent Chénieux
- Edited by: Monica Coleman
- Music by: Wally Badarou
- Distributed by: PolyGram Film Distribution
- Release dates: October 22, 1997 (France); March 5, 1999 (UK)
- Running time: 93 minutes
- Countries: Burkina Faso; France
- Language: English

Kini and Adams is a 1997 Burkinabé drama film directed by Idrissa Ouedraogo. It was filmed in Zimbabwe in English language.

== Plot ==
Somewhere in southern Africa, in a huge region populated by poor peasants, two friends dream of a better life, far from their village, and decide to leave and make their dream come true. In order to leave, they attempt to repair an old car with second-hand spare parts, but their family and friends make fun of them. Little by little, their impetus dies down and so does their friendship. Finally, bitterness and jealousy put an end to the friendship between the two men and they become fierce enemies.

== Cast ==
- Vusi Kunene as Kini
- David Mohloki as Adams
- Nthati Moshesh as Aida
- John Kani as Ben
- Netsayi Chigwendere as Binja
- Fidelis Cheza as Tapera
- Sibongile Mlambo as Bongi
- Simon Shumba as Pedlar
- Walter Muparutsa as Big Oaf
- Tisa Chifunyise as Big Oaf's Wife

== Reception ==
For this film, Idrissa Ouedraogo was nominated for the Palme d'Or at the 1997 Cannes Film Festival and won the Jury prize at the 1998 Bermuda International Film Festival.
