= Boubacar Diallo (filmmaker) =

Burkinabé filmmaker

- Citizenship: Burkinabe
- Occupation: Filmmaker
- Years active: 2005- till present
- Notable work: Traque à Ouaga

Boubacar Diallo is a Burkinabé filmmaker.

== Life and career ==
The son of a veterinarian, he worked as a journalist, launching the satirical weekly magazine Journal du Jeudi and publishing two novels and a collection of short stories.

In 2005, he embarked on a new career as a film maker, shooting three films, Traque à Ouaga, the romantic comedy Sofia, and the Danish coproduction Dossier brûlant, a drama.

With the financial assistance of the Francophonie and the French Foreign Ministry, he produced the TV series Série noire à Koulbi, a crime drama in 30 15-minute episodes, in 2006.
