= Le Beurre et l'argent du beurre =

- Film poster
- Directed by: Alidou Badini & Philippe Baqué
- Screenplay by: Philippe Baqué
- Produced by: Sahelis Productions, La SMAC
- Cinematography: Alidou Badini
- Edited by: Jean-François Hautin
- Release date: 2007
- Running time: 62 minutes
- Countries: Burkina Faso; France

Le Beurre et l'argent du beurre is a 2007 documentary film directed by Alidou Badini and Philippe Baqué. The title, which translates to "Butter and the money from butter", derives from a French idiom equivalent to the English phrase "Have one's cake and eat it too".

== Synopsis ==
Fair trading is very much in fashion today. The concept is to help the most underprivileged populations on our planet to emerge from this state thanks to a fairer distribution of revenues. The Shea butter is produced by the poorest women of Burkina Faso, and is more and more appreciated in Europe. It is used in the cosmetic industry and as a cocoa substitute. Various fair trading experiences claim to help them but, who really profits from the money of the butter?

== Reception ==
Le Beurre et l'argent du beurre was shown at the Amiens International Film Festival and at the African Film Festival of Cordoba. The film received the Jury Grand Prize at the International Environmental Film Festival of Niamey. It has been used as the basis for discussions by groups who support fair trade.
