= Philippe Baqué =

French journalist and documentary filmmaker

- Occupations: Journalist and documentary filmmaker
- Known for: Le Beurre et l'argent du beurre

Philippe Baqué is a French journalist and documentary filmmaker. He is known for his criticism of industrialization of agricultural techniques, and particularly of the "bio" industry.

== Career ==
Between 1987 and 1997 Philippe Baqué wrote for journals such as Le Monde diplomatique, Politis, Nouveau Politis, Témoignage chrétien, Campagne solidaire, Faim développement magazine, Maintenant and Cahiers de l'Iremam. From 1992 to 2003 he also worked on investigations for audio-visual documentaries. In 1999 he published the book Un nouvel or noir, ou le pillage des objets d'art en Afrique (A new black gold, or the looting of art in Africa). He has since written investigative reporting articles on this subject. In 2003 he was a contributing journalist for Le Monde Diplomatique.

Philippe Baqué was project coordinator for the book De la bio alternative aux dérives du « bio »-business, quel sens donner à la bio ? (organic alternative to the excesses of the "bio"-business). This was sponsored by the Alterravia association and supported by Nature-et-Progrès, la Confédération paysanne, Minga and the Forum civique européen. This work pulls together writings by different authors on the damage caused by the bio business. Baqué had become interested in the subject with his 2001 documentary ""Eldorado de plastique" about Andalusia, and with subsequent research in Brazil and Colombia. In February 2011 Philippe Baqué published an article, L’industrialisation du bio (the industrialization of "bio") that took a global view of the industry and claimed that industrial techniques were doing great harm.

== Filmography ==
A partial list of documentaries:

Year	Title	Role	Notes
2007	Le Beurre et l'argent du beurre	Director	Co-directed with Alidou Badini. 62 minutes. Documentary.
2001	Eldorado plastic	Director	52 minutes. Documentary co-directed with Arlette Girardot. Produced by ADL, France 2 broadcast.
1998	Melilla, l'Europe au pied du mur	Director	54 minutes. Documentary co-directed with Arlette Girardot. Produced by ADL and ARTE television. Broadcast in Spanish, Portuguese and Swedish. Selected for the Prix Albert-Londres.
1997	Carnets d'expulsions, de Saint-Bernard à Bamako et Kayes	Director	52 minutes. Documentary co-directed with Arlette Girardot. Produced: 'Yeux Ouverts. Distributed: Planète.
1996	Touaregs, voix de l'exil	Director	26 minutes. Documentary co-directed with Arlette Girardot. Distributed: Planète.
1991	Tobbere Kosam, Poussiere de Lait	Director	27 minutes. Co-directed with Dani Kouyaté. Broadcast on television in Danish, Swiss Roman, Canal France International, Cirtef-TV5.
1995	L'Homme qui marche	First assistant	Fiction. 90 minutes. Directed by Roland Moreau
1994	Keita, l'héritage du griot	First assistant	Fiction. 95 minutes. Directed by Dani Kouyaté. ARTE broadcast

== Bibliography ==
- Philippe Baqué (1999). Un nouvel or noir, ou le pillage des objets d'art en Afrique. Paris-Méditerranée.
