= The Heart's Cry =

- Original title: Le Cri du cœur
- Directed by: Idrissa Ouedraogo
- Written by: Jacques Akchoti; Robert Gardner; Idrissa Ouedraogo
- Starring: Richard Bohringer; Saïd Diarra
- Cinematography: Jean-Paul Meurisse; Jean Monsigny
- Edited by: Luc Barnier
- Music by: Henri Texier
- Distributed by: Cinéma Public Films
- Release dates: September 1994 (Venice Film Festival); 5 April 1995 (France)
- Running time: 86 minutes
- Countries: Burkina Faso; France
- Language: French

The Heart's Cry (French: Le Cri du cœur) is a 1994 Burkinabé/French drama film directed by Idrissa Ouedraogo.

== Plot ==
Moctar is a young boy who, although born in France, has grown up in Mali. At the age of eleven, he moves with his family to live in Paris. Moctar struggles to adjust to life in France, and is homesick for Africa. He begins to see visions of a hyena in the street. When he tells people, nobody believes him. He is laughed at by his schoolmates and sent to the school psychologist. He meets a man in the street called Paulo who helps Moctar to understand his visions.

== Cast ==
- Richard Bohringer as Paulo
- Saïd Diarra as Moctar
- Félicité Wouassi as Saffi
- Alex Descas as Ibrahim Sow
- Clémentine Célarié as Deborah
- Jean-Yves Gautier as Paul Guerin
- Cheik Doukouré as Mamadou
- Adama Ouédraogo as Adama
- Ginette Fabet as Firmine
- Adama Kouyaté as Grandfather
- Valérie Gil as Miss Romand
- Grégoire Le Du as Olivier

== Reception ==
It won the OCIC Award - Honorable Mention at the 1994 Venice Film Festival.
