= Dani Kouyaté =

Burkinabé film director

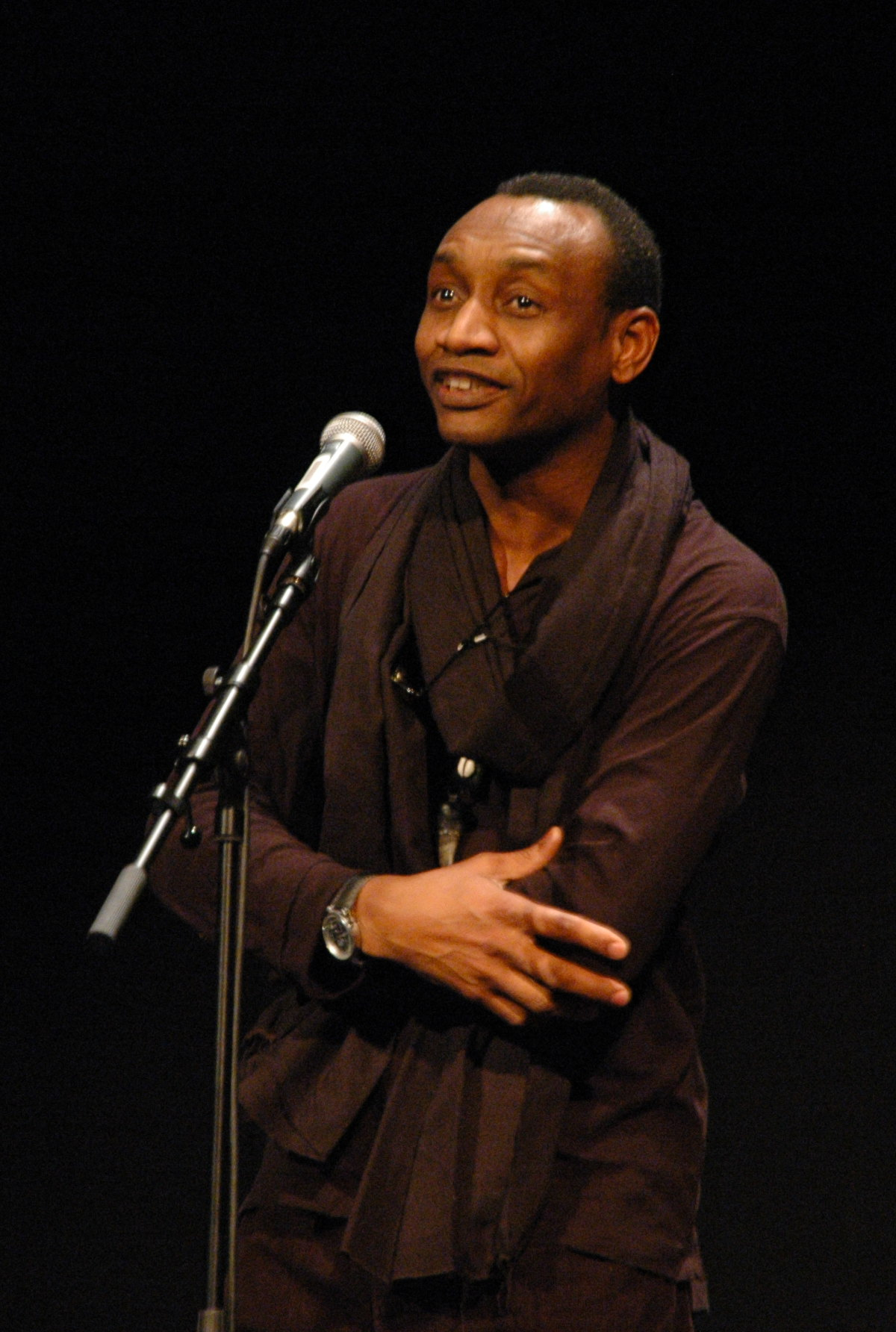
- Kouyaté at the Cinémathèque Française for the premiere of his film Ouaga-Saga in 2004.
- Born: Dani Kouyaté; June 4, 1961 (age 64); Bobo-Dioulasso, Burkina Faso
- Occupations: Film director and jeli (griot)
- Years active: 1989-present
- Awards: Best First Film Prize (FESPACO); 1995 Keïta! l'Héritage du griot Junior Prize (Cannes); 1995 Keïta! l'Héritage du griot

Dani Kouyaté (born June 4, 1961) is a film director and jeli (griot) from Burkina Faso, which the BBC describes as "Africa's most important film-making country".

== Biography ==
Kouyaté was born in 1961 in Bobo-Dioulasso. He is the son of one of the first Burkinabé actors, Sotigui Kouyaté, and is a member of the Mandinka ethnic group. Kouyatés have served as jelis for the Keita dynasty since the 13th century. The Kouyatés guard customs, and their knowledge is authoritative amongst Mandinkas. Keitas have to provide amenities to Kouyatés, who in turn should not hesitate to ask for Keita help. The word Kouyaté translates as "there is a secret between you and me".

The junior Kouyaté trained at the Institute Africain d'Education Cinématographique in Burkina Faso's capital of Ouagadougou before travelling to France for five years of study at the Sorbonne where he obtained a Master's degree in Cultural and Social Marketing. He also received a degree from the International School of Anthropology in Paris, and an advanced degree in Cinema from the Université de Vincennes à Saint-Denis. From 1990 to 1996 Kouyaté toured the United States and Europe as part of "La Voix du Griot" ("Voice of the Griot"), a storytelling theater show founded by his father. He began his film career in 1989 with the short film Bilakoro, which was co-directed with Issa Traoré de Brahima. In 1992 he was co-founder of the film production company Sahelis Productions with Sékou Traoré and Issa Traoré de Brahima. He directed a number of other short films before the release of his first full-length feature, Keïta! l'Héritage du griot in 1995.

Sundjata Keita's 13th century epic, Sundjata, was Kouyaté's inspiration for the film, which depicts a middle-class family in Ouagadougou. He shot it in Ouagadougou, Sindou, and Ouahabou. His father played the central role of Djeliba Kouyaté, who was imagined as an old dying man by Dani Kouyaté, though was portrayed as more forceful than that. Keïta! received the Best First Film Prize from the Panafrican Film and Television Festival of Ouagadougou (FESCAPO) and was awarded the Junior Prize at the Cannes Film Festival. In a 1995 interview, he reflected on the experience and commenting on traditional society, saying:

Sometimes when you don't know where you're heading, you have to return to where you came from in order to think things over before continuing your journey. Today, with all the things happening to her, Africa has trouble finding which direction to take—modernity, tradition, or some other road. We are not really capable of digesting all these things. We don't know who we are, and we don't know where we are going. We are between two things. Between our traditions and our modernity.

In 1999 he created several episodes of the Burkinabé television series À nous la vie (roughly "Let's grab life"). The second feature film Kouyaté directed was Sia, le rêve du python, released in 2001. It "operates simultaneously on three levels: as a visually compelling, exciting story set in a mythical past; as a political allegory, in which the events of the past are a continual commentary on Africa today; and as a rumination on the power and value of myth and legend." His father played the complex General Watigué, and the junior Kouyaté performed as a musician, strumming his guitar and playing several percussion instruments.

He also directed the award winning film Ouaga-Saga (2004), which premiered at FESCAPO in 2005. It tells the story of 11 Burkinabés struggling to overcome poverty to realise their dreams. Kouyaté had five weeks to film this, though it took longer to complete.

== Filmography ==
Title	Year	Notes
Katanga: The Dance of the Scorpions	2025	Feature film
While We Live	2016	Feature film
Soleils	2013	Feature film
Joseph Ki-Zerbo	2005	Documentary
Ouaga-Saga	2004	
Sia, le rêve du python	2001	Also writer
À nous la vie	1999	Television series
Keita! L'héritage du griot	1995	Also writer
Les Larmes sacrées du crocodile	1992	Short film
Tobbere Kossam	1991	Short film, codirected by Philippe Baqué
Bilakoro	1989	Short film, codirected by Issa Traoré de Brahima
