= Hélène Diarra =

Malian actress

Maïmouna Hélène Diarra
- Born: Maïmouna Hélène Diarra; 1955; Segou, Mali
- Died: June 10, 2021 (aged 65–66); Bamako, Mali
- Occupation: Actress
- Years active: 1981–present
- Known for: Moolaadé (2004); Code Unknown (2000); Skirt Power ("Taafé Fanga") (1997)

Maïmouna Hélène Diarra, also Helena Diarra (1955–June 10, 2021), was a Malian actress known for playing the roles of older women from her young age. She was the CEO of the International Fund for the Development of Active Retirement. She also was the Vice President of the Professional Association of Decentralized Financial Systems of Côte d'Ivoire.

== Early life and education ==
Diarra was born in 1955 in Segou, Mali but was orphaned at an early age and raised by her uncles and grandmother. In 1975, she was admitted into the National Pedagogical Institute for a Diploma of Fundamental Studies in the teaching profession. Between 1975 and 1977 she played for the Bamako Reds women's basketball team. In 1981, she obtained a diploma in theatre arts at the National Arts Institute.

== Career ==
In 2000, she was featured as "Aminate" in Michael Haneke's drama film, Code Unknown. Other cast include Aïssa Maïga, Juliette Binoche, Thierry Neuvic, Josef Bierbichler and others.

In 2004, she was featured in Ousmane Sembène's Bambara language film, Moolaadé, playing the role of "Hadjatou". Other cast members include Fatoumata Coulibaly and Salimata Traoré. The film was presented at the 2007 Ebertfest. It was nominated for a "Best Film" award at the Cannes Film Festival.

In 2006, she starred in Abderrahmane Sissako's drama film, Bamako, in which she played the role of "Saramba". Other cast members include Aïssa Maïga and Tiécoura Traoré.

== Death ==
Diarra died on 10 June 2021 at the CHU Mère-Enfant Le Luxembourg hospital in Bamako and was buried at the Hamdallaye cemetery.

== Filmography ==
Year	Film	Role	Notes
2011	Toiles d'araignées	Actress (Nah)	Drama
2007	Faro: Goddess of the Waters	Actress (Kouta)	Drama
2006	Bamako	Actress (Saramba)	Drama
2004	Moolaadé	Actress (Hadjatou)	Drama
2000	Code Unknown	Actress (Aminate)	Drama
1999	Genesis ("La Genèse")	Actress (Lea)	Drama
1997	Skirt Power ("Taafé Fanga")	Actress (Timbé)	Comedy, Drama
1996	Macadam tribu	Actress (Macho's wife)	Comedy, Drama
1995	Guimba the Tyrant	Actress (Meya)	Comedy, Drama, Fantasy
1989	Finzan	Actress (as Helena Diarra)	Drama
