= Nadia Ben Rachid =

French-Tunisian film editor

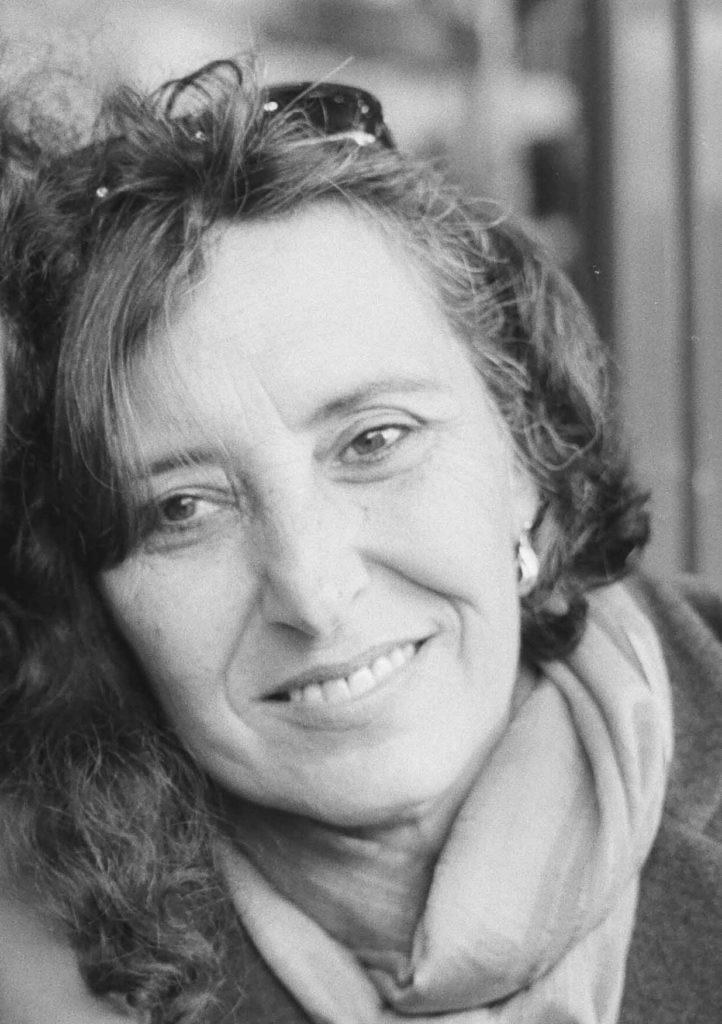
- Occupation: Film editor

Nadia Ben Rachid is a Franco-Tunisian film editor. She has over thirty years of experience, and has spent two decades working with filmmaker Abderrahmane Sissako. She won the award for Best Editing at the 2015 Césars for Sissako's 2014 film Timbuktu.

== Biography ==
Ben Rachid started her editing career working with 35mm film on celluloid.

Ben Rachid has edited such acclaimed films as Timbuktu, Waiting for Happiness, Bamako Life On Earth, and Tug of War. She has also edited numerous documentaries such as all of Anne Aghion's films including 2005 Emmy winner In Rwanda we say... The family that does not speak dies and 2009 Cannes Official Selection doc My Neighbor My Killer, Tarr Béla, I Used to Be a Filmmaker and Michka Saäl's Les prisonniers de Beckett.

Ben Rachid was invited to the Academy of Motion Picture Arts and Sciences in 2015. Ben Rachid describes the process of editing as shaping a director's idea into a "harmonious, fluid idea." Her film editing has been called "nimble" by the New Statesman.
