= Maji-da Abdi =

Ethiopian film director and producer (born 1970)

- Born: 25 October 1970 (age 55); Dire Dawa, Ethiopian Empire
- Education: University of Western Ontario
- Occupations: Film director, film producer
- Years active: 2001–present

Maji-da Abdi (born 25 October 1970) is an Ethiopian film director and producer.

== Biography ==
Born in Dire Dawa, Abdi lived in Addis Ababa until the age of four. In the aftermath of the 1974 revolution, her mother, who had divorced her father, fled with her and her brother to Nairobi, Kenya. Abdi completed her primary and most of her secondary education in Kenya. At the age of 17, she moved to Canada with her family to study business. Enrolled at the University of Western Ontario, Abdi became accustomed to international cultures. She felt different from most of her classmates, who wanted to obtain jobs on Wall Street, and finished a program in French literature. After graduation, Abdi worked for several years in journalism as well as film production.

Abdi was travelling in Nepal in the 1990s when she met Bernardo Bertolucci, who was in the process of filming Little Buddha. She decided to become an intern on the set. In 2001, Abdi moved back to Ethiopia and directed her first documentary, The River That Divides, exploring the daily life of Ethiopian women during the Eritrean–Ethiopian War. The film received a Canadian human rights prize.

Abdi also became involved in film production. In 2001, she produced the short film The Father by Ermias Woldeamlak, examining African familial relations. Abdi worked with Abderrahmane Sissako as a producer and costume designer on his films Waiting for Happiness (2003) and Bamako (2006). She served on the jury for short films and Cinéfondation at the 2013 Cannes Film Festival. Abdi is concerned with water resource issues as well as the environment more generally. She married Sissako.

In 2010, Abdi created the film festival Images That Matter, the first festival dedicated to Ethiopian short films. She had planned to create such a festival for several years but eventually received funding from the Ethiopian Ministry of Culture and Olivier Poivre d'Arvor. At the first festival, Abdi created workshops to help young filmmakers get trained. She said that six years prior to the festival, Ethiopian cinema lagged behind most countries but the level of production was increasing. In addition to film work, Abdi works for Orbs, a magazine focusing on science, art and spirituality.
