= Waiting for Happiness =

2002 drama film by Abderrahmane Sissako

- Directed by: Abderrahmane Sissako
- Written by: Abderrahmane Sissako
- Produced by: Maji-da Abdi; Nicolas Royer
- Cinematography: Jacques Besse
- Edited by: Nadia Ben Rachid
- Music by: Oumou Sangare
- Distributed by: New Yorker Films
- Release date: May 19, 2002
- Running time: 90–96 minutes
- Countries: France; Mauritania
- Languages: Hassaniya Arabic; French; Mandarin
- Budget: €1.45 million

Waiting for Happiness (original title: Heremakono; Arabic: في انتظار السعادة, romanized: fīl-intiẓār as-saʿāda) is a 2002 Mauritanian drama film written and directed by Abderrahmane Sissako. Main characters are a student, who has returned to his home in Nouadhibou, an electrician and his child apprentice, and the local women. The film is characterized by a succession of scenes of the daily life of the characters which are unique to their particular African and Arab cultures, while borrowing from tropes of Tayeb Saleh's Season of Migration to the North (موسم الهجرة إلى الشمال). The viewer must interpret the scenes without much help from narrator or plot, while the structure of the film hangs on a series of mundane but visually arresting moments, many of which are repeated in other works in Abderrahmane Sissako's opus, including scenes at a barber shop and a photo booth, also present in his earlier La Vie Sur Terre and later Timbuktu. The film presents typical Mauritanian moments of beauty, struggle, alienation, and humor, which are experienced by groups socially divided from each other, such as Bidhan women drinking tea and gossiping, West African migrants passing through Mauritania to get to Europe (and finding an unsuccessful comrade washed ashore). The young protagonist who has returned interacts with all of these groups as an outsider, as he struggles to remember even his own Hassaniya Arabic dialect, but prefers instead French. Many of the themes and characters presage Sissako's 2014 film Timbuktu, and both explore liminal Sahel identities authentically situated in everyday life. Waiting for Happiness premiered at the 2002 Cannes Film Festival in the Un Certain Regard section. Sissako dedicated the film to his mother, who died on its last day of filming.

== Cast ==
- Khatra Ould Abder Kader as Khatra
- Maata Ould Mohamed Abeid as Maata
- Mohamed Mahmoud Ould Mohamed as Abdallah
- Nana Diakité as Nana
- Fatimetou Mint Ahmeda as Soukeyna, the mother
- Makanfing Dabo as Makan
- Santha Leng as Tchu
