= Tiécoura =

Tiécoura is a given name. Notable people with the name include:

- Tiécoura Coulibaly (born 1988), Ivorian footballer
- Tiécoura Traoré, Malian actor
