= Tiécoura Traoré =

Malian actor

- Occupation: Actor
- Known for: Tinye So (2010); Bamako (2006)

Tiécoura Traoré is a Malian actor.

== Career ==
In 2006 he was featured as "Chaka" in Abderrahmane Sissako's drama film, Bamako. Other cast include: Aïssa Maïga and Hélène Diarra.

In Daouda Coulibaly's 2010 short film, Tinye So, he was featured as the "Man with traditional clothes".

In 2012 he featured in Dominique Phillipe's film, Tourbillon à Bamako, also featuring Fatoumata Coulibaly, Chek Oumar Sidibé, Mama Koné, Babou Thembely.

== Filmography ==
Year	Film	Role	Notes	Ref.
2012	Tourbillion à Bamako	Actor	Comedy	
2010	Tinye So	Actor	Short film, Mystery	
2006	Bamako	Actor (Chaka)	Drama	
