= My Mother, My Bride and I =

- Directed by: Hans Steinbichler
- Starring: Matthias Brandt; Monica Bleibtreu; Maria Popistașu
- Release date: 6 September 2008 (TIFF)
- Running time: 1h 27min
- Country: Germany
- Language: German

My Mother, My Bride and I (German: Die zweite Frau) is a 2008 German drama film directed by Hans Steinbichler. It was awarded the Grimme-Preis in 2009.

== Cast ==
- Matthias Brandt - Erwin Kobarek
- Monica Bleibtreu - Frau Kobarek
- Maria Popistașu - Irina
- Maia Morgenstern - Bogdana
- Sven Pippig - Karl
- Selena Alexandru - Selena, Irinas Tochter
- Markus Böker - Arzt
- Maximilian Löwenstein - Bankangestellter
- Gabriel Raab - Irinas Tanzpartner
