= Xavier Letourneur =

French director and actor

- Born: Xavier Le Tourneur d'Ison; France
- Occupation(s): Director, Screenwriter
- Years active: 1981–2018
- Spouse: Muriel Lemaire

Xavier Le Tourneur d'Ison, popularly known as Xavier Letourneur, is a French filmmaker and actor. One of the most respected artists in France, he has produced more than 5000 artistic works in cinema, theatre and television.

== Career ==
He studied economics at the University of Paris X. Then he obtained a higher accounting studies diploma as well. After graduation in 1975, he started to work for a bank of the CGE - Alcatel group. He later resigned from the job in 1984. During his tenure at the bank, he enrolled in Cours Simon in 1978 where he later graduated in 1981.

After quit from the job, he played at the café theater while continuing to work at Électro Banque for two years. In 1982, he participated in the creation of the Sentier des Halles. During this period, he played and directed eight shows at the Edgar theater where he collaborated with Christian Dob and Michel Rougeron. In 1994, along with his wife, Dob and Rougeron, Letourneur created the T"héâtre le Mélo d'Amélie" and continued to produce stage plays for more than 15 years. In the meantime, he met Olivier Marchal and together produced the play Braquo.

At the end of the 1980s, Letourneur actively participated in the "Petit Théâtre de Bouvard" for three years along with Dob, Rougeron and Marchal. In 1992, he made his first television appearance. During this time, he joined with fellow director Christian Lara and co-directed seven films. Along with Eric Civanyan, he also produced five plays and four films.

== Theatre work ==
=== As an actor ===
- 1981 : Pourquoi de et mis
- 1982 : Meutres au 700 ter rue des espadrilles
- 1983/84 : Fais voir ton Cupidon
- 1983/84 : Dieu m'tripote de et mis
- 1983/89 : Les Babas cadres
- 1985 : C'est encore loin la mairie
- 1987 : La Pension
- 1987/90 : Nous on fait ou on nous dit
- 1990 : Coyote saloon
- 1991 et 1997/98 : Les faux jetons
- 1992/93 : Petaouchnock
- 1993/94 : Silence en coulisses
- 1994/95 : Rififoin dans les labours
- 1995/96 : Passage avide
- 1999 : Espèces menacées
- 1999/2000 : Un Monde merveilleux
- 2000 et 2010/11 : Un conseil très municipal
- 2000/02 : Les acteurs sont fatigués
- 2001 : Les désirs
- 2002 : Entorse pour une enflure
- 2003/04 : On n'avait pas dit 9 heures ?
- 2004/05 : Daddy blues
- 2005 : Tout un cinéma
- 2006 : Le déclin
- 2008 : Toc toc
- 2010 : Réactions en chaine
- 2011/12 : André le magnifique
- 2013/14 : Hier est un autre jour
- 2015/16 : Sans rancune
- 2017/18 : J'aime beaucoup ce que vous faites
- 2019/20 : A vrai dire

=== As a director ===
- Union libre et Une fille impossible
- Le bébé avec l'eau du bain
- Bientôt les fêtes
- Anniversaire au self
- J'aime beaucoup ce que vous faites
- Caumartin puis à nouveau au Palais des Glaces
- Panne de télé
- Un Conseil très municipal
- Tout un cinéma
- Amour et chipolatas
- Qui m'aime me suive
- On choisit pas ses vacances
- Diète party
- Échauffements climatiques
- Le temps du gourdin
- Jackpot de Clément Naslin
- L'amour est dans le poste
- De gros dossiers ou Je la sens bien cette histoire
- Comment lui dire
- Franchise obligatoire

== Filmography ==
=== Short films ===
- 1981 : La Découverte
- 1982 : Merlin ou le Cours

=== Feature films ===
- 1982 : Le gendarme et les gendarmettes de Jean Girault :le capitaine au côté
- 1983 : Prends ton passe-montagne, on va à la plage
- 1996 : Fantôme avec chauffeur
- 1997 : Sucre amer
- 1998 : Tout baigne
- 2000 : Papa, je crack
- 2001 : Voyage à Ouaga
- 2002 : Sexes très opposés
- 2003 : Mais qui a tué Pamela Rose
- 2004 : Ne quittez pas
- 2008 : L'Ennemi public
- 2010 : Tout est encore possible
- 2012 : Mais qui a retué Pamela Rose
- 2014 Escaves et Coutisanes
- 2018 Yafa

=== Home movies ===
- 1998 : Un amour de cousine
- 1998 : Le Monde à l'envers
- 2000 : Le monde à l'envers : Le secret d'Alice
- 2004 : Dans la tête du tueur
- 2004 : Ils voulaient tuer
- 2007 : Les Liens du sang
- 2009 : Le Mystère Joséphine
- 2009 : L'École du pouvoir
- 2012 : La Guerre du Royal Palace
- 2015 : Un été en provence
