= Rut Brandt =

Norwegian writer, wife of Willy Brandt

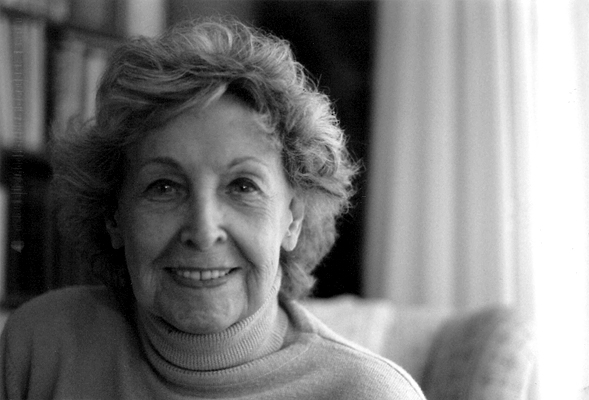
Brandt by Stuart Mentiply

Rut Brandt (10 January 1920 – 28 July 2006) was a Norwegian-born German writer and the wife of the German chancellor Willy Brandt between 1948 and 1980, including most of his political career as Governing Mayor of Berlin (1957–1966) and German chancellor (1969–1974). Rut Brandt became highly popular in Germany and a noted public figure in her role as First Lady of Berlin and the chancellor's spouse.

== Life ==
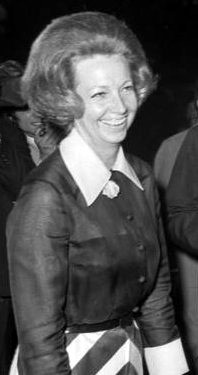
Brandt in 1970

Born Rut Hansen in Hamar, Norway, she worked initially in a bakery in Norway and then as a tailor's apprentice. At age 16, she joined a socialist youth group, which conducted political activities against the German occupation during the Second World War. In 1942, she fled to Sweden with one of her sisters.

In Sweden, she married her Norwegian friend, Ole Olstadt Bergaust, who died in 1946. In 1944, Hansen met Willy Brandt, the later German Chancellor, who had fled Germany. After Bergaust's death, Brandt and Hansen married in 1948.

When Willy Brandt became chancellor in 1969, Rut Brandt was at his side as a very successful and popular First Lady. However, when she discovered in 1979 that Brandt had an affair with Brigitte Seebacher (later his third wife), Rut Brandt filed for divorce. After the divorce was granted in 1980, Rut and Willy Brandt went their separate ways and never saw each other again. When Brandt died in 1992, Brigitte Seebacher-Brandt did not allow Rut to attend the funeral – a decision which was highly criticised by many Germans.

Rut Brandt died on 28 July 2006 in Berlin, aged 86, from undisclosed causes.

== Family ==
Willy and Rut Brandt had three sons:

- Peter Brandt (born 1948), historian
- Lars Brandt (born 1951), writer, filmmaker, artist
- Matthias Brandt (born 1961), actor

== Books by Rut Brandt ==
- Freundesland. Erinnerungen. (1992) ISBN 978-3-455-08443-6
- Wer an wen sein Herz verlor. Begegnungen und Erlebnisse. (2001) ISBN 978-3-471-79461-6
