= Aïssa Maïga =

French actress

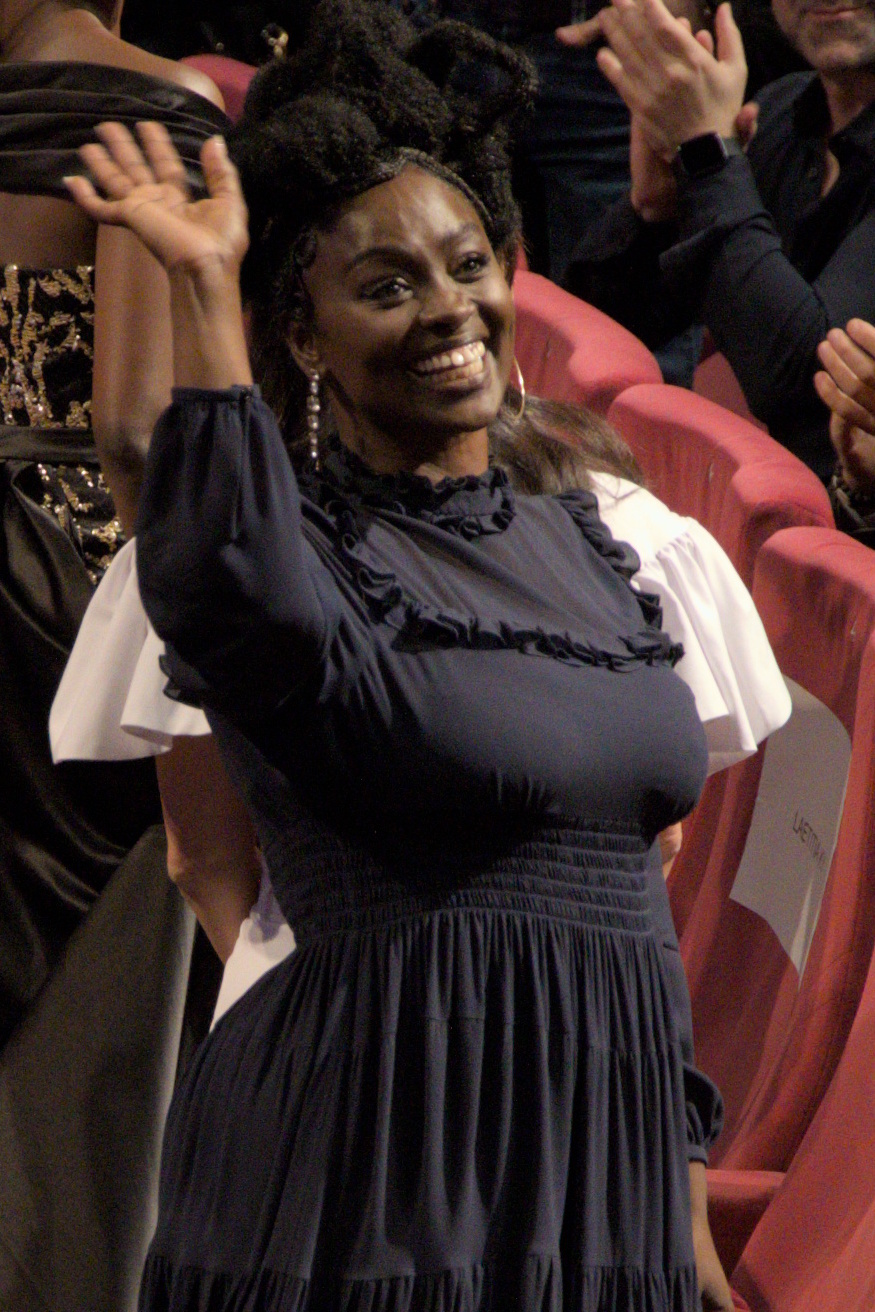
- Maïga at the 2025 Cannes Film Festival
- Born: Aïssa Maïga; 25 May 1975 (age 51); Dakar, Senegal
- Occupations: Actress, producer, activist
- Years active: 1997–present
- Awards: Best Actress for Bianco e nero (2008) at the Festival du Cinema Italien de Bastia.[10]

Aïssa Maïga (born 5 May 1975) is a Senegal-born French actress, director, writer, producer, and activist. Maïga has worked with major auteurs like Michael Haneke, Abderrahmane Sissako and Michel Gondry, and recently starred in Chiwetel Ejiofor’s directorial debut.

Maïga is an advocate for inclusion and has been vocal about racial discrimination in the film industry throughout her career. Maïga was inspired to speak out and create the DiasporAct collective after realising she was often the sole performer of colour to receive top billing and awards season attention—despite the abundance of diverse talent around her.

== Early life ==
Maïga was born in Dakar, Senegal to a Malian father and Senegalese mother. Maïga grew up in Dakar but would go to Mali on holidays as a child to spend time with her grandmother, uncles, aunts, and cousins. Her family comes from a small town in the region of Gao—near the Sahara desert—and her father is of the Songhay people.

She moved to France when she was four years old to live with her aunt and uncle. Her father, Mohamed Maïga, a journalist, was murdered in 1984, a few months before the Head of State in Burkina Faso was killed in a coup.

== Career ==
=== Career beginnings (1996–2005) ===
Maïga landed a role alongside Yvan Attal in Denis Amart's Saraka Bô (1996), her acting was well received, and she went on to play a rebellious young girl in Michael Haneke's Code Unknown (2000) and his later film Caché (2005). Her work in Cédric Klapisch's Russian Dolls (2005) cemented her role as a notable performer in French cinema.

=== Bamako and career breakthrough (2005–2011) ===
Maïga was nominated for a César Award for Most Promising Actress for her role in Abderrahmane Sissako’s Malian drama Bamako (2006) and became the first French actress of African descent to ever receive a nomination, thereby becoming the most visible black actress working in France. That same year, an anthology film called Paris, je t’aime (2006) was also premiered at Cannes and Maïga was the female lead in the short film directed by South African filmmaker Oliver Schmitz. Maïga was joined on the Cannes red carpet by Oliver Schmitz and producer Danny Glover.

Bianco e nero (2008) starring Maïga and Favio Volo was the first successful and mainstream Italian film to tackle interracial romance. In 2009, Maïga won Best Actress for Bianco e nero (2008) at the Festival du Cinema Italien de Bastia.

=== Rise to stardom and international career (2012–present) ===
Maïga starred alongside Audrey Tautou and Romain Duris in Michel Gondry's surreal and whimsical Mood Indigo (2014). In 2016, Maïga starred in the Netflix film The African Doctor (2016) alongside Democratic Republic of the Congo actor Marc Zinga.

In 2018, Maïga premiered in the Irish RTÉ crime series Taken Down (2018–present) written by Stuart Carolan and her role was received with critical acclaim.

Maïga co-starred with Chiwetel Ejiofor in his joint film with Netflix set during the Malawian food crisis in the 2000s, The Boy Who Harnessed the Wind (2019). She was the lead female character—Agnes Kamkwamba—and the film premiered at the Sundance Film Festival and was added to Netflix on March 1, 2019.

== Political activism ==
Maïga is a leading figure in a new wave of activism by people of colour in French cinema in response to the lack of black representation in French films. The few roles available in the industry for black actors and actresses are usually racial stereotypes and Maïga uses her platform to challenge this and encourage change.

=== DiasporAct collective ===
Maïga has collaborated with fifteen other black actresses and French personalities to create the DiasporAct collective. The group consists of Maïga, Nadège Beausson-Diagne, Mata Gabin, Maïmouna Gueye, Eye Haïdara, Rachel Khan, Sara Martins, Marie-Philomène Nga, Sabine Pakora, Firmine Richard, Sonia Rolland, Magaajyia Silberfeld, Shirley Souagnon, Assa Sylla, Karidja Touré, and France Zobda.

==== DiasporAct book 'Black is Not My Job' ====
Before Maïga went to Malawi in 2017 to film Chiwetel Ejiofor’s adaptation of The Boy Who Harnessed the Wind (2019), Maïga wrote the essay that would become the book's foreword. Once the filming was over, she dedicated herself to the book and contacted a group of performers to bring many perspectives to the project.

“I’ve often asked myself why I’m one of the only black actresses to work in a country as racially mixed as France.”—Aïssa Maïga, Black is Not My Job

The DiasporAct group published a book called Noire n’est pas mon métier (which means 'Black is not my job') (ed. Seuil). The essays in this book featured a response to the lack of representation and inclusion that black actresses face in French cinema, as well as the stereotypical portrayal of black people whenever they are included. The book details the inequity and racism black women face in the French film industry and outlines personal stories and casting experiences specific to black actresses, and came to fruition amid the #MeToo movement and the Cannes festival that had a wave of calls for inclusion.

The book was a success in France and has sparked debate about minority representation.

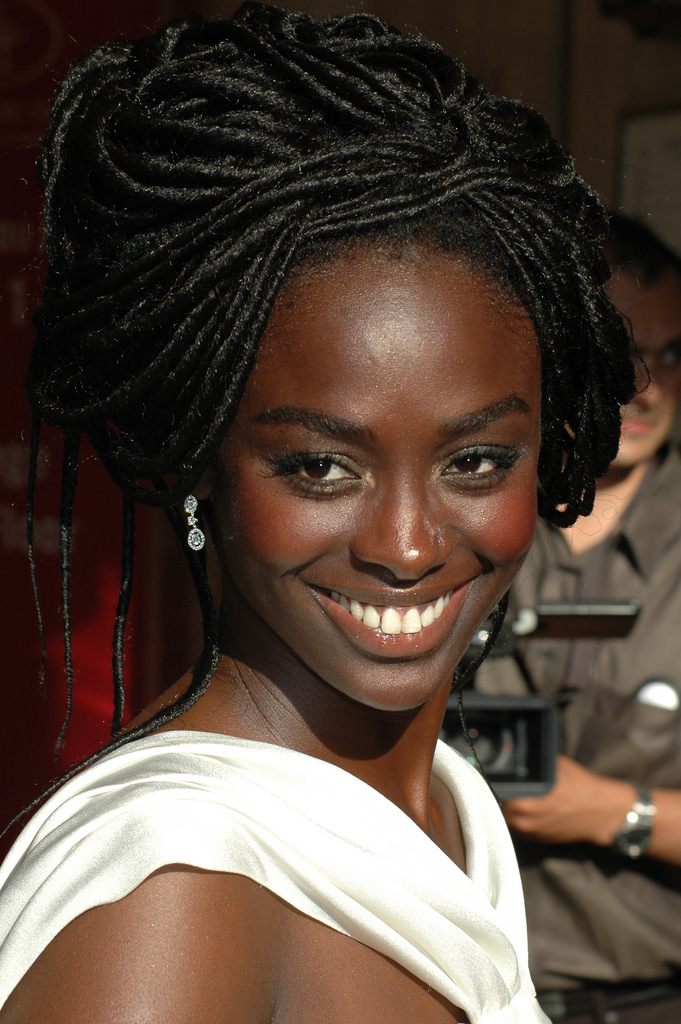
Aïssa Maïga at the 2007 Cannes Film Festival

==== DiasporAct red carpet anti-racism protest at Cannes ====
Maïga and the DiasporAct collective held a peaceful anti-racism protest as they went into the premiere of Lee Chang-dong's FIPRESCI Prize–winning film, Burning at the 71st Annual Cannes Film Festival in 2018. The group of women stood at the top of the red carpet steps at the festival and raised their fists while dancing joyously to the Rihanna song Diamonds to protest the racial bias and discrimination that is rampant within the French film industry. During a press conference that featured the group, Maïga told Agence France-Presse that setting up a racial quota in the French film industry is a potential option for combating the lack of onscreen diversity, and acknowledged that this could spark strong opposition in France. All members of the group wore matching black and white ensembles created by Balmain's mixed-race designer Olivier Rousteing who told Vogue:

“I think we are really at a huge turning point in every industry, whether film, or fashion, or music. We are living in a world where we are trying to break from the past and define what we want from the future. I believe in the power of women, I have since I was a little boy, and this moment means a lot to me.”

The clear message of the protest, combined with the recently released book to back it up, was met positively—the consequent media reports talked of their beauty, style and courage.

=== 2020 César awards ===
Maïga and 30 fellow actors of colour all spoke out against the lack of diversity among those nominated for a 2020 César award in an open letter entitled '#BlackCesars' that was published just before the awards ceremony. The intention of the open letter was to shed light on the absence of Black, Arab, and Asian performers and filmmakers in the nominations for the event.

On the night of the 45th César awards, Maïga gave a speech calling out the lack of diversity in French cinema. The speech was unexpected and contrasted with the congratulatory speeches that had taken place throughout the evening, the predominantly white audience of the "French Oscars" were all frozen in silent surprise and discomfort. Maïga began her speech by greeting the 12 black people (out of the 1,600 guests) and proceeded to outline the ways in which black people and their stories are systemically ignored in French media, TV, and cinema.

"We survived whitewashing, blackface, tonnes of dealer roles, housekeepers with a Bwana accent, we survived the roles of terrorists, all the roles of hypersexualised girls...but we are not going to leave French cinema alone."—Aïssa Maïga, 2020 César awards

When Roman Polanski was awarded Best Director later in the ceremony, Maïga walked out along with Adèle Haenel to join the protestors outside the awards ceremony who were chanting "Polanski is a rapist".

== Philanthropy ==
Maïga was an ambassador for AMREF's Stand Up for African Mothers Campaign (SU4AM). In 2013 AMREF Africa organised a trip for French SU4AM ambassadors to visit Uganda for events in collaboration with French midwives to support their colleagues in Africa. Here Maïga (along with singer Zazie, international fencing champion Laura Flessel, former midwife Mathilde de Calan who works at the French Ministry of Foreign Affairs, and AMREF France's Haweya Mohamed) met Ugandan midwife Esther Madudu at the Katine Health Centre, took part in an outreach mission, and visited the Masaka School of Midwifery and Comprehensive Nursing in Kampala and the Tiriri Health Centre IV in Soroti.

== Personal life ==
Vogue cites Maïga as its “French style crush” and says she has “never once disappointed”, Maïga challenges the “just rolled out of bed” Parisian style and opts for a look that is glamorous and elegant.

== Theater ==
Year	Title	Author	Director	Notes
2004	Brooklyn Boy	Donald Margulies	Michel Fagadau	Comédie des Champs-Élysées
2011	Les Grandes Personnes	Marie NDiaye	Christophe Perton	Théâtre national de la Colline
2015	Good People	David Lindsay-Abaire	Anne Bourgeois	Théâtre Hébertot

== Filmography ==
=== Film ===
==== As actress ====
Year	Title	Role	Director	Notes
1997	Saraka bô	Danièle	Denis Amar	
1998	La revanche de Lucy	Lucy	Janusz Mrozowski	
1998	Le cadeau de maman		Patrick Helpine	Short
1999	Jonas et Lila, à demain	Lila	Alain Tanner	
2000	Code Unknown	Black Girl	Michael Haneke	
2000	Le prof	Julie	Alexandre Jardin	
2000	Lise et André	Esther	Denis Dercourt	
2000	Marie-Line	Malika	Mehdi Charef	
2000	Mom's Present	Farida	Patrick Helpine (2)	Short
2001	Voyage à Ouaga	Loutaya	Camille Mouyéké	
2002	Georges chez les tops	Gisela	Olivier Chrétien	Short
2003	Mes enfants ne sont pas comme les autres	Myriam	Denis Dercourt (2)	
2003	Les baigneuses	Rita's sister	Viviane Candas	
2003	Rien que du bonheur	Anna	Denis Parent	
2004	Libre armada		Ingrid Gogny, Vincent Jaglin, ...	
2005	Russian Dolls	Kassia	Cédric Klapisch	
2005	Caché	Chantal	Michael Haneke (2)	
2005	L'un reste, l'autre part	Farida	Claude Berri	
2005	Travaux, on sait quand ça commence...	Condé's fiancé	Brigitte Roüan	
2005	Le train	The barman	Brahim Fritah	Short
2006	Bamako	Melé	Abderrahmane Sissako	Nominated - César Award for Most Promising Actress
2006	Paris, je t'aime	Sophie	Oliver Schmitz	
2006	Don't Worry, I'm Fine	Léa	Philippe Lioret	
2006	I Do	Kirsten Hansen	Éric Lartigau	
2006	Mamdou il est où ?	Mariettou	Khady N'Diaye	Short
2007	L'âge d'homme... maintenant ou jamais !	Tina	Raphaël Fejtö	
2007	Carcasse	Aïssa	Ismael El Iraki	Short
2008	Black and White	Nadine	Cristina Comencini	Bastia Italian Film Festival - Best Actress
2008	Les insoumis	Kathia	Claude-Michel Rome	
2009	Diamant 13	Farida	Gilles Béhat (2)	
2009	L'aide au retour	The official	Mohammed Latreche	Short
2010	Ensemble, c'est trop	Clémentine	Léa Fazer	
2010	Le temps de la kermesse est terminé	Martina	Frédéric Chignac	
2010	L'Avocat	Ève	Cédric Anger	
2011	Mineurs 27	Aminata	Tristan Aurouet	
2011	Dédicace	Elise	Olivier Chrétien (2)	Short
2012	HOUBA! On the Trail of the Marsupilami	Clarisse Iris	Alain Chabat	
2012	Today	Nella	Alain Gomis	
2012	One Man's Show	Elisa	Newton Aduaka	
2013	Mood Indigo	Alise	Michel Gondry	
2013	Aya of Yop City	Aya	Alain Chabat	Voice
2014	Prêt à tout	Alice	Nicolas Cuche	Globes de Cristal Award for Best Actress
2016	The African Doctor	Anne Zantoko	Julien Rambaldi	
2016	Corniche Kennedy	Awa	Dominique Cabrera (2)	
2016	Love Is Dead	Léane	Éric Capitaine	
2017	Il a déjà tes yeux	Salimata Aloka	Lucien Jean-Baptiste	
2019	The Boy Who Harnessed the Wind	Agnes Kamkwamba	Chiwetel Ejiofor	
2019	Mon Frère	Claude	Julien Abraham	
2022	Neneh Superstar	Martine Gnaore	Ramzi Ben Sliman	
2023	Big Kids	Aude	Andréa Bescond & Eric Métayer	Comedy / Drama
2023	Impatientes	Dr. Milleux	Quentin Delcourt	Short
2025	Promised Sky	Marie	Erige Sehiri	

==== As director ====
Year	Title	Form	Notes
2021	Regard noir	Documentary	Co-directed with Isabelle Simeoni
2021	Marcher sur l’eau	Documentary	Maïga also co-wrote

=== Television ===
Year	Title	Role	Director	Notes
1998	Un mois de réflexion	Sylvie	Serge Moati	TV movie
1999	Maison de famille	Sylvie	Serge Moati	TV movie
2002	Négro	Aïssa	Karim Akadiri Soumaïla	TV movie
2003	Commissaire Moulin	Dolly	Joyce Buñuel	Episode: "Série noire"
2003	Les Cordier, juge et flic	Aline	Gilles Béhat	Episode: "Adieu mulet"
2004	Par accident	Constance	Jérôme Foulon	TV movie
2005	Sometimes in April	Young Militant	Raoul Peck	TV movie
2005	P.J.	Marie-Laure Vecchiali	Christophe Barbier	Episode: "Délivrance"
2006	Une famille parfaite	Martha	Patrick-Mario Bernard & Pierre Trividic	TV movie
2008	Sex, Okra and Salted Butter	Amina	Mahamat Saleh Haroun	TV movie
2009	Pas de toit sans moi	Ashanti	Guy Jacques	TV movie
2009	Suite noire	Sara	Dominique Cabrera	Episode: "Quand la ville mord"
2012	Toussaint Louverture	Suzanne	Philippe Niang	TV miniseries
2013	Mortel été	Julie	Denis Malleval	TV movie Luchon International Film Festival - Best Actress
2015	Mystère à la Tour Eiffel	Henriette	Léa Fazer (2)	TV movie
2018	Taken down	Abeni	David Caffrey	Miniseries
