= The Ghost (1982 film) =

1982 film

Das Gespenst The Ghost
- Directed by: Herbert Achternbusch
- Written by: Herbert Achternbusch
- Produced by: Herbert Achternbusch
- Starring: Herbert Achternbusch
- Cinematography: Jörg Schmidt-Reitwein
- Edited by: Micki Joanni
- Release date: 30 October 1982
- Running time: 88 minutes
- Country: West Germany
- Language: German

The Ghost (German: Das Gespenst) is a 1982 West German black-and-white film directed by and starring Herbert Achternbusch. It was entered into the 33rd Berlin International Film Festival. This tragicomic satire explores the clash between a resurrected Jesus and the modern world, provoking controversy for its perceived blasphemy. Initially denied classification by the German film rating board (FSK) and facing reduced state funding, the film sparked public protests, legal challenges, and intense media debate. Despite—or because of—its notoriety, it attracted significant attention and viewership. The film was banned in Austria under laws against religious disparagement, a prohibition that remains in effect. It was later reclassified and released on DVD in Germany in 2008.

== Plot ==
The film is divided into several loose acts, similar to a play. The return of the Savior to Bavaria in the 1980s is staged in dramatic images and grotesque scenes. Surrealistic provocations and taboo-breaking arise both from the radical visual language and the satirical dialogues critical of authority and, in particular, the church.

The life-size figure of Christ, the “42nd Lord God” of a Bavarian monastery church, descends from the cross after a lamenting prayer by a disappointed mother superior. In the form of a snake, he crawls into her bed and transforms back into human form. From then on, he accompanies the mother superior (in German: “Oberin”) and becomes the bartender (in German: “Ober”) of the monastery's own pub. There he serves the two policemen Poli and Zisti (the names are diminutive forms of the German word “Polizist” which means: policeman), who, as a result of their drunkenness, order “shit”. He then tries in vain to persuade people at the Munich weekly market to fill the shot glasses he has brought with him with excrement for the police. A helpful woman takes him to a police station where he encounters Poli and Zisti again, who agree to fulfill their order themselves. Since they are unable to defecate into the glasses despite their best efforts, they shoot each other in order to at least fill the glasses with blood.

The 42nd Lord God and the mother superior travel through Bavaria. Resting at a pond, the mother superior bathes while he—unable to swim—can only walk on the water. He is amazed by female genitalia and by the fact that the mother superior can store frogs in her vagina. She crucifies the frogs to remind him of his past. He frees the frogs again while philosophizing about the differences between his past and humanity today.

In the monastery pub, he serves three drunk Roman soldiers who talk about crucifixions and the behavior of those crucified, while he gets drunk himself and the mother superior hides.

When they run out of money, the mother superior suggests that they go their separate ways. In search of a place to sleep, the 42nd Lord God pretends to be a magician and convinces a returning landlord of his abilities by revealing objects and a man that the landlord's adulterous wife has hastily hidden. Finally, the 42nd Lord God fulfills the master's wish to see the devil by pointing to the hidden man, a priest.

Throughout the film, he repeatedly transforms into an increasingly weaker snake. In the end, he is picked up in the beak of the mother superior, who has transformed into a bird of prey, and carried away into the sky.

== Cast ==
- Herbert Achternbusch as Ober
- Annamirl Bierbichler as Oberin
- Werner Schroeter as Bischof
- Kurt Raab as Poli
- Dietmar Schneider as Zisti
- Josef Bierbichler as Römer / Landwirt
- Franz Baumgartner as Römer / Vertreter
- Alois Hitzenbichler as Römer / Priester
- Judit Achternbusch as Novizin
- Rut Achternbusch as Novizin
- Gabi Geist as Vertretersgattin
- Gunter Freyse as Mann
- Ann Poppel as Frau
