= Angry Harvest =

1985 German drama film

- Directed by: Agnieszka Holland
- Written by: Paul Hengge; Agnieszka Holland
- Produced by: Artur Brauner; Peter Hahne; Klaus-Dieter Lehmann; Klaus Riemer
- Starring: Armin Mueller-Stahl; Elisabeth Trissenaar
- Cinematography: Jozef Ort-Snep
- Edited by: Barbara Kunze
- Music by: Jörg Straßburger
- Production company: CCC Film
- Distributed by: Concorde Filmverleih
- Release date: 20 February 1985
- Running time: 105 minutes
- Country: West Germany
- Language: German

Angry Harvest (German: Bittere Ernte) is a 1985 West German film directed by Agnieszka Holland, based on a novel written by Hermann Field and Stanislaw Mierzenski while they were imprisoned by the Polish government in the early 1950s. The circumstances surrounding the novel's creation are detailed in Field's autobiographical account, Trapped in the Cold War: The Ordeal of an American Family.

The film received a nomination for the Academy Award for Best Foreign Language Film at the 58th Academy Awards.

== Plot ==
The film begins in the winter of 1942/1943, with the German Wehrmacht almost entirely occupying Europe. Jewish medical student Rosa Eckart flees from a freight train in Upper Silesia, which was supposed to take her to a concentration camp. While fleeing, she loses sight of her husband and son.

Initially, she hides in a forest. Then she encounters Polish farmer Leon, an older bachelor. He decides to hide the beautiful young woman, initially out of pity, and nurses the fever-stricken woman back to health. Leon is a staunchly Catholic man who had actually wanted to become a priest. However, only celibacy remains of that desire. He suffers from his loneliness and has become a strange man to his neighbors.

Rosa quickly becomes his only hope of escaping this lonely life. Leon forces Rosa to become his lover, and she finds herself trapped in this relationship, with her only alternative being certain death. Initially, she considers escaping. However, days turn into weeks and months spent in a safe hiding place yet in a peculiar relationship of sorts.

While Rosa longs for freedom, Leon dreams of marriage. At the same time, he also fears that their hiding place will be discovered, and he will lose the beloved Rosa. He searches for a new hiding place for her. When he finds it, Rosa thinks that Leon has betrayed her to the Germans and takes her own life.

== Cast ==
- Armin Mueller-Stahl: Leon Wolny
- Elisabeth Trissenaar: Rosa Eckart
- Wojciech Pszoniak: Cybulowski
- Gerd Baltus: Geistlicher
- Anita Höfer: Pauline
- Hans Beerhenke: Kaspar
- Käte Jaenicke: Anna
- Isa Haller: Magda
- Margit Carstensen: Eugenia
- Kurt Raab: Maslanko
- Gunter Berger: Walden
- Wolf Donner: Dan

== Production ==
The film was shot at the Spandau Studios in Berlin.

== Reception ==
Lexikon des internationalen Films described the film as "an intense psychological study of political opportunism in conflict with personal feelings. Director Agnieszka Holland skillfully and sensitively portrays the two excellent lead actors."

According to Erica Lehrer, the film is one of the only cultural representations that goes into the complex realities of the rescue of Jews in German-occupied Poland.

== Awards ==
At the 1985 Montreal International Film Festival, Mueller-Stahl was awarded Best Actor for his performance. The film was also nominated for an Oscar in the category of Best Foreign Language Film in 1986.

The German Film and Media Evaluation (FBW) in Wiesbaden awarded the film the rating of "particularly valuable."

== See also ==
- List of submissions to the 58th Academy Awards for Best Foreign Language Film
- List of German submissions for the Academy Award for Best Foreign Language Film
