= Brigitte Borghese =

Moroccan-born French actress

- Born: Tamar ElKayam; 2 January 1951; Mazagan, Morocco
- Died: 6 February 2012 (aged 61); Paris, France
- Occupation: Actress
- Years active: 1969–1998
- Spouse: Richard Berneron (m. 1975; div. 1979)

Brigitte Borghese (born Tamar ElKayam; 2 January 1951 – 6 February 2012) was a Morocco-born French actress. She is best known for her roles in Jean Rollin's Les Trottoirs de Bangkok and Operation Las Vegas.

== Early life ==
Brigitte Borghese was born in 1951 in Morocco. She decided on being an actress from an early age and moved to Paris, France, where she trained at René Simon's Cours Simon drama school.

== Career ==
Borghese made her acting debut in Menahem Golan's 1969 film Margo Sheli. She has appeared in adult and traditional films. During the seventies she had roles in several films, her first being, a part in the adult feature Je prends la chose... du bon côté!, La bonzesse, Tout le monde il en a deux, her first time working with French director Jean Rollin, the fantasy horror Tendre Dracula, with Peter Cushing and Alida Valli, ...et mourir de désir, Les petites saintes y touchent, Les bijoux de famille, Le commando des chauds lapins, and L'hippopotamours.

She is perhaps best known for her role as gang leader 'Rita' in Jean Rollin's 1984 film Les Trottoirs de Bangkok, her second time working with the director. Her final appearance in a Rollin film was in the comedy Ne prends pas les poulets pour des pigeons.

It was during the eighties that Borghese's acting career began to cease. In the nineties, she had the leading role in the action film Operation Las Vegas, with Richard Harrison. In 1998, Borghese again played a leading role in the American/French television film Brooklyn Cop. Following her role in Brooklyn Cop, Borghese was to again work with director N.G. Mount in his next film Britta the Torture, but the project remains unfinished.

== Filmography ==
Year	Title	Role	Notes
1969	Margo Sheli		
1973	Je prends la chose... du bon côté!		
1974	La bonzesse	Marie-Paule	
1974	Tout le monde il en a deux	Malvina	
1974	Tender Dracula	La secrétaire du producteur	
1974	...et mourir de désir	Nelly	
1974	Les petites saintes y touchent	Joan, la leader du MLF	
1975	Les bijoux de famille		
1975	Le commando des chauds lapins		
1976	L'hippopotamours	Paméla	
1984	Les Brésiliennes du Bois de Boulogne		
1984	Les Trottoirs de Bangkok	Rita	The Sidewalks of Bangkok
1985	Le facteur de Saint-Tropez	Hélène de Lespinasse	
1985	Ne prends pas les poulets pour des pigeons		
1987	La peau de l'ours n'est pas à vendre		
1990	Operation Las Vegas	Britta	
1992	Trepanator	Kim	Direct-to-video
1995	Le syndrome d'Edgar Poe	Morella	Direct-to-video
1998	Brooklyn Cop		Television film
