= Wohin? (film) =

1988 film

- Directed by: Herbert Achternbusch
- Written by: Herbert Achternbusch
- Starring: Franz Baumgartner
- Cinematography: Adam Olech
- Release date: 5 May 1988
- Running time: 96 minutes
- Country: West Germany
- Language: German

Wohin? is a 1988 West German drama film directed by Herbert Achternbusch. It was entered into the 38th Berlin International Film Festival.

== Cast ==
- Franz Baumgartner as Franz
- Annamirl Bierbichler
- Josef Bierbichler as Skunk
- Gunter Freyse as Gunter
- Gabi Geist as Gabi
- Kurt Raab as Gast
