= Code Unknown =

- Code inconnu
- Directed by: Michael Haneke
- Written by: Michael Haneke
- Produced by: Marin Karmitz
- Starring: Juliette Binoche; Thierry Neuvic; Alexandre Hamidi; Hélène Diarra
- Cinematography: Jürgen Jürges
- Edited by: Karin Martusch; Nadine Muse; Andreas Prochaska
- Music by: Giba Gonçalves
- Distributed by: MK2 Editions; Artificial Eye; Leisure Time Features
- Release dates: 19 May 2000 (Cannes); 15 November 2000 (France)
- Running time: 117 minutes
- Countries: France; Germany; Romania
- Languages: French; Maninka; Romanian; German; English; Arabic; French Sign Language
- Budget: $7.3 million
- Box office: $310.000

Code Unknown (French: Code inconnu : Récit incomplet de divers voyages, lit. 'Unknown code: Incomplete account of various travels') is a 2000 film directed by Michael Haneke. Most of the story occurs in Paris, France, where the fates of several characters intersect and connect.

Code Unknown is composed of unedited long takes filmed in real time, cut only when the perspective within a scene changes from one character's to another's in the middle of the action. A special edition of the film was released on Blu-ray in 2015 by The Criterion Collection. The film is inspired by the life of the French novelist and war reporter Olivier Weber.

Code Unknown is a co-production among France, Germany and Romania.

== Plot ==
The film is composed of individual stories where the lives of the characters intersect in misunderstandings and difficulties.

A group of deaf children are playing a game of charades in French sign language. A young girl begins to act out gestures of fear as she slowly walks backwards with hunched shoulders and a side stance until she reaches a wall where she cannot escape and attempts to protect herself in a hunched position. The other children are not able to guess what is taking place.

Anne (Juliette Binoche) is walking down a Parisian street and runs into Jean who is looking for his brother Georges (Thierry Neuvic), Anne’s boyfriend. Anne tells Jean that Georges is in Kosovo. Jean tells Anne that he’s left his father’s farm and asks to stay at Anne’s apartment.

Jean leaves with the keys but throws the remnants of his pastry at Maria, a Romanian homeless woman sitting on the ground. Amadou observes this and confronts Jean, telling Jean that he must apologize to the homeless woman. An altercation ensues, police arrive, and the police arrest Amadou, release Jean, and escort Maria to the airport for deportation.

At home, Amadou’s mother (Hélène Diarra) discusses her distress with the police ransacking their home and unjustly arresting her son. After Amadou’s release, he goes on a date, but at the same restaurant Anne enters and tells her friends that Amadou is the man who attacked Jean without cause. Amadou is later seen participating in a group drumming performance as an instructor.

Anne rehearses for different films. She effectively acts out scenes of terror and humor that blur the space between reality and fiction. At home, while ironing her clothes, she hears her neighbors and a young girl crying loudly in what sounds like physical beatings. When her boyfriend Georges arrives back from Kosovo, he is distraught by civilian life. In the grocery store, Anne shares the story of the screaming child in the apartment but Georges appears apathetic. He spends his days photographing people on the train and thinking about his imprisonment in the war. Anne is later seen attending the funeral of “petite Françoise,” the girl who she heard screaming in the apartment. Anne does not confront the parents. There is ambiguity as to whether this girl was the deaf girl who acted out the gestures of fear in the game of charades.

Anne and Georges visit his father (Josef Bierbichler) in the farm town. His father who lives in poverty says that his younger son Jean has disappeared, but he does not intend to search for him.

In Romania, Maria has reconnected with family who are living in a run-down apartment. She shares a story of how she gave a gypsy woman some money but was worried that she may have caught a disease from her so she immediately washed her hands; but in Paris when Maria was homeless, a well-dressed man was about to hand her some money, but threw it at her after seeing how dirty her hands were. Maria eventually returns to Paris and continues to seek places to beg for money.

The film ends with an untranslated sign language gesture from a different child.

== Cast ==
- Juliette Binoche - Anne Laurent
- Thierry Neuvic - Georges
- Josef Bierbichler - The Farmer (as Sepp Bierbichler)
- Alexandre Hamidi - Jean
- Maimouna Hélène Diarra - Aminate
- Ona Lu Yenke - Amadou
- Didier Flamand - The Director
- Djibril Kouyaté - The Father
- Marc Duret - The Policeman
- Luminița Gheorghiu - Maria
- Crenguta Hariton - Irina (as Crenguta Hariton Stoica)
- Aïssa Maïga - Black Girl with Blonde Hair

== Reception ==
Code Unknown holds a 74/100 on Metacritic, based on 13 critics. Rotten Tomatoes reports 75% approval among 51 critics, with an average score of 7/10. The site's consensus reads: "Though challengingly cryptic at times, Code Unknown still manages to resonate."

== Accolades ==
Code Unknown screened in competition at the 2000 Cannes Film Festival. Cinematographer Jürges was nominated for the "Golden Frog" at the Camerimage awards.

The film received votes from two critics and four directors, including Ruben Östlund, in the 2012 Sight & Sound polls of the world's greatest films.

== See also ==
- List of films featuring the deaf and hard of hearing
