= Der Neger Erwin =

1981 film

- Directed by: Herbert Achternbusch
- Written by: Herbert Achternbusch
- Produced by: Herbert Achternbusch
- Starring: Herbert Achternbusch
- Cinematography: Jörg Schmidt-Reitwein
- Edited by: Heidi Handorf
- Release date: February 1981
- Running time: 92 minutes
- Country: West Germany
- Language: German

Der Neger Erwin is a 1981 West German film directed by and starring Herbert Achternbusch. It was entered into the 31st Berlin International Film Festival.

== Cast ==
- Herbert Achternbusch as Der Neger Erwin
- Annamirl Bierbichler as Die Wirtin Susn
- Helga Loder as Starke Dame
- Alois Hitzenbichler as 1. starker Mann
- Franz Baumgartner as 2. starker Mann
- Helmut Neumayer as Polizeihauptmann
- Dietmar Schneider as Leutnant
- Siegfried Zügel as Kranführer
- Gabi Geist as Reporterin
- Josef Bierbichler as Museumwächter
- Lisa Fitz as Italienerin
- Bert Huber as 2. Gast
- Karolina Herbig as Mam
- Lotte Koll as Weinende Frau
- Andreas Achternbusch as Polizistlein
