= Rostov-Luanda =

1997 Mauritanian documentary film

- Directed by: Abderrahmane Sissako
- Written by: Abderrahmane Sissako
- Produced by: Christian Baute, Pierre Hanau, Dominique Andreani
- Cinematography: Jacques Besse
- Edited by: Claudio Martinez
- Production companies: Agence de la Coopération Culturelle et Technique; Instituto Angolano de Cinema; Ministère de la Coopération; Morgane Films; Radio Télévision Belge Francophone (RTBF); Televisao Publica de Angola; Zweites Deutsches Fernsehen (ZDF)
- Distributed by: California Newsreel
- Release date: 25 January 1997; (Netherlands)
- Running time: 76 minutes
- Countries: Angola; Mauritania; France; Germany; Belgium
- Language: French

Rostov-Luanda is a 1997 Mauritanian documentary film directed by Abderrahmane Sissako and co-produced by Christian Baute, Pierre Hanau, and Dominique Andreani.

The documentary deals with long standing friendship between the director Sissako who met Baribanga, an Angolan student, during a train ride from Moscow to Rostov when both were moving to study film in Moscow. Many years later, Sissako made his journey across war-torn Angola to find his friend.

The film had its premier on 25 January 1997 in the Netherlands. The film received positive reviews from critics and screened at many film festivals. In 2018, at the Namur International Festival of French-Speaking Film, it received a Special Mention at the TV5 Best Documentary Award.
