= Matthias Brandt =

German actor (born 1961)

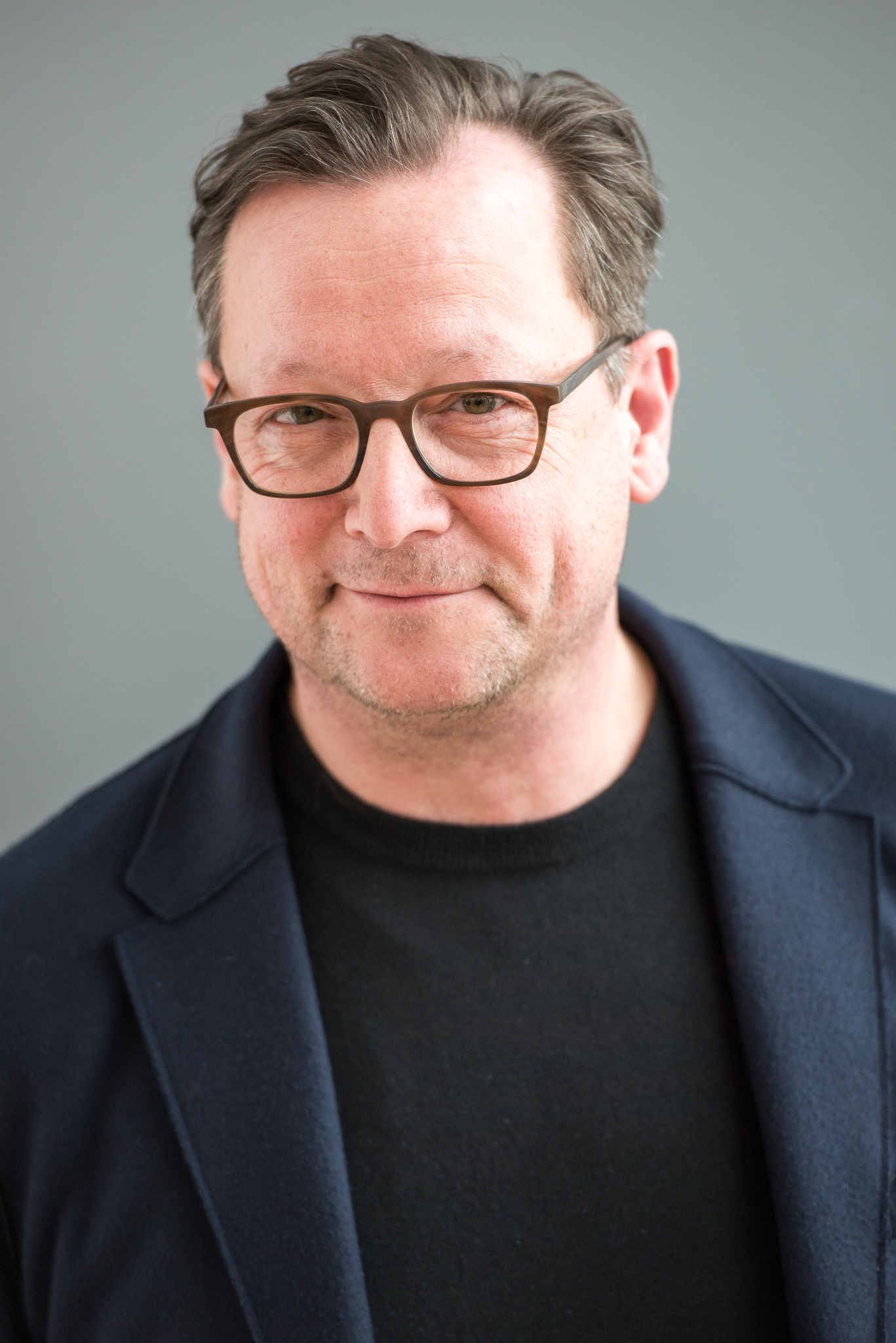
- Brandt in 2016
- Born: 7 October 1961 (age 65); West Berlin, West Germany
- Occupations: Actor; narrator; writer
- Years active: 1989–present
- Spouse: Sofia Brandt
- Children: 1
- Parent(s): Willy Brandt; Rut Hansen

Matthias Brandt (born 7 October 1961) is a German actor, audiobook narrator, and writer. He has appeared in more than seventy films since 1989.

== Early life ==
Brandt was born in West Berlin. He is the youngest of the three sons of the former German Chancellor Willy Brandt and his Norwegian-born wife Rut. He has an older half-sister Ninja from his father's first marriage with Carlota Thorkildsen.

== Awards ==
- 2024 Carl Zuckmayer Medal

== Selected filmography ==
=== Films & TV movies ===
Year	Title	Role	Notes
1989	Ein Prachtexemplar	Zivi	TV film
1993	Barmherzige Schwestern	Assistant doctor	
2002	Boyz 'n' Babes	Mr. Fischer	TV film
2002	Big Girls Don't Cry	Jost	
2003	In the Shadow of Power	Günter Guillaume	TV film
2004	Der Stich des Skorpion	Volker Erler	TV film
2007	Contergan	Henrik Spiess	TV film
2007	Counterparts	Georg Hoffmann	
2008	My Mother, My Bride and I	Erwin Kobarek	
2011	Promising the Moon	Lorenz Schleier	
2013	Where Friendship Ends	Andreas Rogel	TV film
2013	Afghanistan: A Murderous Decision	General Georg Klein	TV film
2014	A Faithful Husband	Georg Sahl	TV film
2014	The Witness House	Erwin von Lahousen	TV film
2016	Stefan Zweig: Farewell to Europe	Ernst Feder	
2018	Unterwerfung	Rediger	TV film
2018	Transit	Barkeeper/narrator	
2021	Sörensen hat Angst	Frieder Marek	TV film
2023	Afire	Helmut	
2025	Miroirs No. 3	Richard	

=== Television series ===
Year	Title	Role	Notes
1991	Pfarrers Kinder, Müllers Vieh	Manfred	6 episodes
2001	Die Biester	Herr Senne	12 episodes
2011–2018	Polizeiruf 110	Hanns von Meuffels	15 episodes
2014	Crime Scene Cleaner	Man	1 episode
2017	Babylon Berlin	August Benda	16 episodes
2018	Dittsche	Estate administrator	1 episode
2020	Das Geheimnis des Totenwaldes	Thomas Bethge	6 episodes
2026	The Trap	Norbert Rudow	Miniseries

== Books ==
- Raumpatrouille. Stories. Kiepenheuer & Witsch, Köln 2016, ISBN 978-3-462-04567-3.
- Blackbird. Novel. Kiepenheuer & Witsch, Köln 2019, ISBN 978-3-462-05313-5.
- Nein sagen. Über den 20. Juli 1944, meine Eltern und persönliche Verantwortung heute. Kiepenheuer & Witsch, Köln 2026, ISBN 978-3-462-01627-7.
