= Josef Bierbichler =

German actor (born 1948)

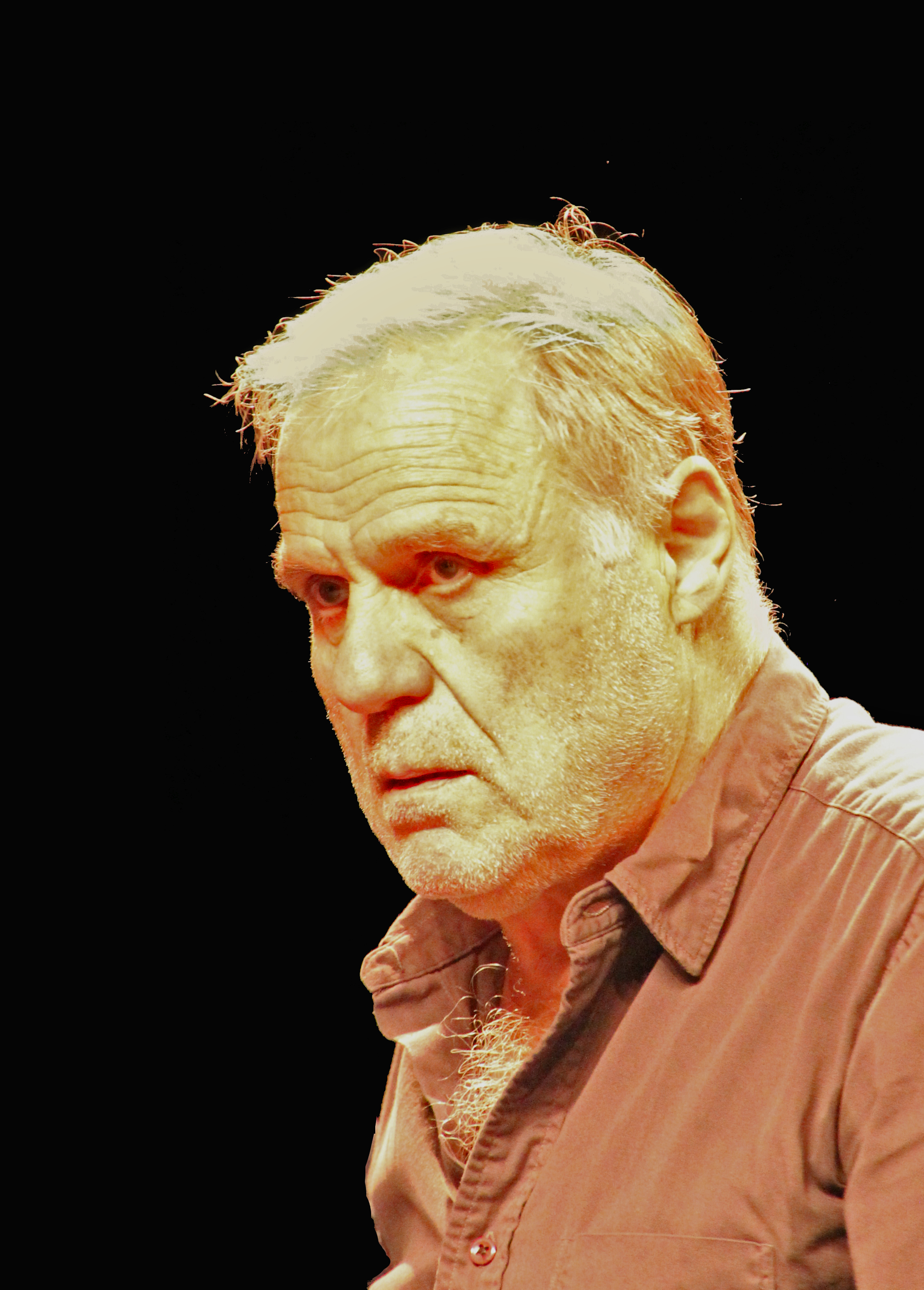
- Bierbichler in 2018
- Born: 26 April 1948 (age 77); Ambach, Germany
- Other names: Sepp Bierbichler
- Occupation: Actor

Josef "Sepp" Bierbichler (born 26 April 1948) is a German actor.

== Filmography ==
- 1976: Heart of Glass – director: Werner Herzog
- 1976: Die Atlantikschwimmer
- 1977: Bierkampf – director: Herbert Achternbusch
- 1977: Servus Bayern
- 1977: Tatort – Schüsse in der Schonzeit
- 1979: Woyzeck – director: Werner Herzog
- 1981: Mein Freund der Scheich (TV film)
- 1981: Der Neger Erwin
- 1982: The Ghost – director: Herbert Achternbusch
- 1983: Straight Through the Heart (TV film)
- 1986: Heilt Hitler
- 1987: Triumph der Gerechten
- 1988: Wohin?
- 1991: Wildfire
- 1993: Deadly Maria – director: Tom Tykwer
- 1995: Dicke Freunde (TV film)
- 1997: Picasso in München
- 1997: Freier Fall (TV film)
- 1997: Winter Sleepers – director: Tom Tykwer
- 1998: Neue Freiheit – keine Jobs. Schönes München: Stillstand
- 2000: Code Unknown – director: Michael Haneke
- 2000: The Farewell – director: Jan Schütte
- 2001: Heidi
- 2001: Ein Dorf sucht seinen Mörder (TV film)
- 2003: Polterabend – director: Julian Pölsler (TV film)
- 2003: Das Konto (TV film)
- 2004: Hierankl – director: Hans Steinbichler
- 2004: Außer Kontrolle (TV film)
- 2006: Winter Journey – director: Hans Steinbichler
- 2007: Bierbichler (Documentary by Regina Schilling)
- 2008: A Year Ago in Winter – director: Caroline Link
- 2008: The Architect − director: Ina Weisse
- 2009: The Bone Man – director: Wolfgang Murnberger
- 2009: Germany 09 (Anthology film)
- 2009: The White Ribbon – director: Michael Haneke
- 2011: Brand
- 2013: Exit Marrakech
- 2013: Verbrechen (TV series, 6 episodes)
- 2014: A Life For Football – director: Hans Steinbichler (TV film)
- 2015: Don't Look at Me That Way
- 2020: Merkel: Anatomy of a Crisis (TV film)

== Awards ==
- Adolf Grimme Award (1998), best performance in the ZDF TV film Freier Fall
- Adolf Grimme Award (2006), best performance in Hierankl, along with Johanna Wokalek, Barbara Sukowa and Peter Simonischek
- Theaterpreis Berlin (2008)
- Fontane Prize of the City of Neuruppin for the novel Mittelreich (2016)
