= Hierankl =

- Directed by: Hans Steinbichler
- Written by: Hans Steinbichler
- Starring: Johanna Wokalek; Barbara Sukowa; Josef Bierbichler
- Cinematography: Bella Halben
- Edited by: Christian Lonk
- Music by: Antek Lazarkiewicz
- Distributed by: Avista Film / Movienet
- Release date: 1 July 2003
- Running time: 93 minutes
- Country: Germany
- Language: German

Hierankl is a German award-winning family drama which premiered on 1 July 2003 at the Munich Film Festival. The modern Heimatfilm, named after a district in Surberg, Germany, is the film debut of writer and director Hans Steinbichler.

It received several nominations and awards, among them the 2006 Adolf Grimme Award for acting, cinematography, writing and direction.

== Cast ==
- Johanna Wokalek – Lene
- Barbara Sukowa – Rosemarie
- Josef Bierbichler – Lukas
- Peter Simonischek – Goetz Hildebrand
- Frank Giering – Paul
- Alexander Beyer – Vincenz
