= Cours Simon =

French drama school

Coordinates: 48°51′30″N 2°23′06″E

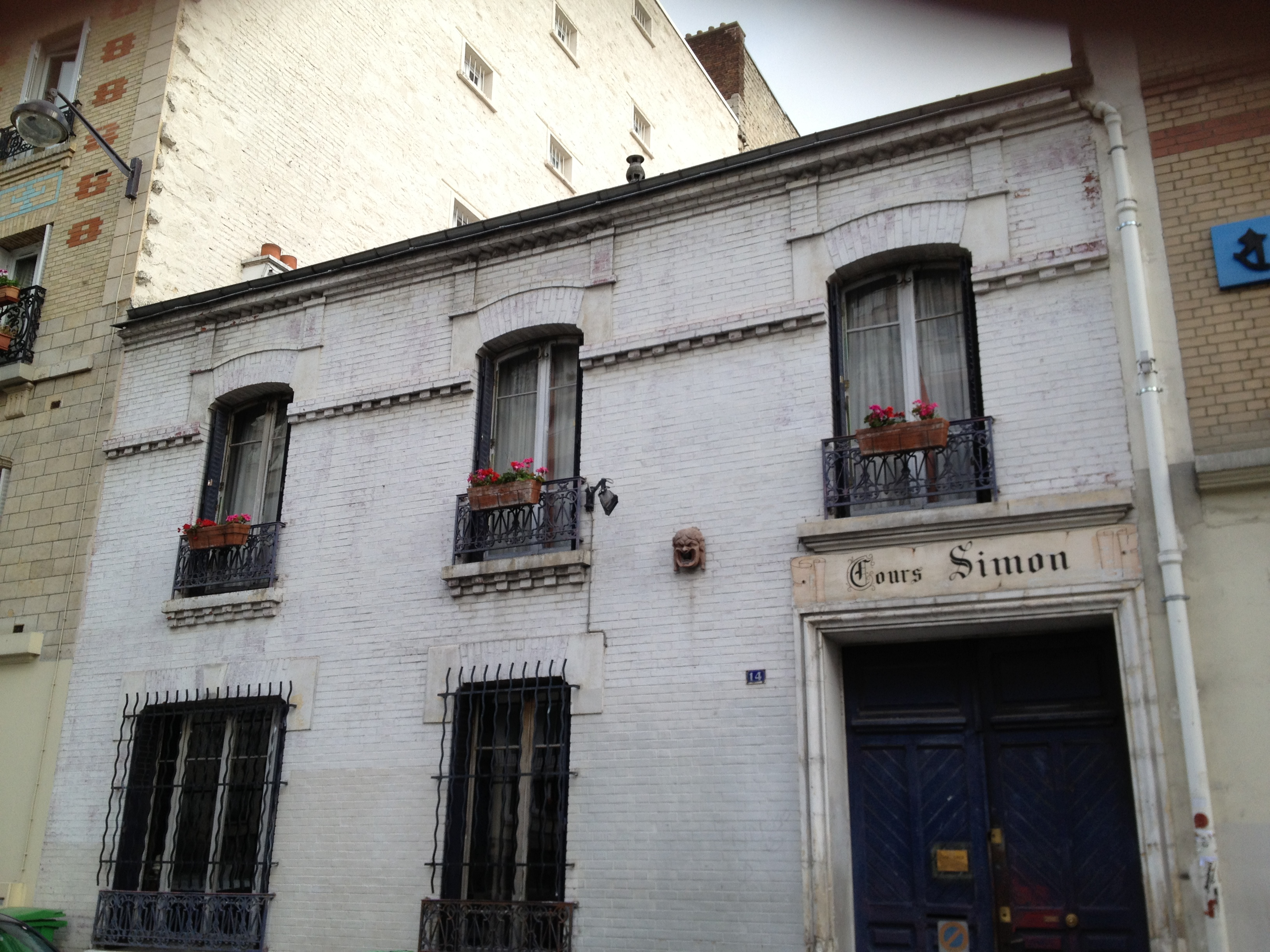
The school at 14 Rue La Vacquerie, Paris

Cours Simon, or cours d'art dramatique René-Simon is one of the oldest schools for theatre actors in France. It was founded in 1925 and since 1983 has been based at 14, rue la Vacquerie, in Paris's 11th arrondissement.

== History ==
The school was founded in 1925 by René Simon(1898–1971) who was in charge it until 1971. It was then taken over by former pupil Rosine Margat, and since 2010 it has been run by Chantal Brière. René Simon was married to the actress Simone Simon, with who they had a son, television and radio host Fabrice.

Formerly situated in the Invalides in the 7th arrondissement of Paris, in 1983 they moved to the 11th arrondissement close to the Père-Lachaise Cemetery. The school offers a three-year course to students, who attend fifteen hours a week, preparing them for entrance to the Conservatoire national supérieur d'art dramatique.

Students are required to study classical writers such as Aristophanes, Jean Racine, Molière and Shakespeare alongside contemporary international playwrights such as Sarah Kane, Edward Bond, Harold Pinter, Dario Fo, Samuel Beckett, Luigi Pirandello, Bertolt Brecht and Anton Chekov. Informal weekly classes are also offered to children and adults. A new site in Marseille is due to open in September 2024.

== Notable alumni ==
The school has a number of former students who went on to have successful careers in stage and screen, including:

- Alain Dorval
- Alexia Barlier
- André Falcon
- Annemarie Düringer
- Anouchka Delon
- Brigitte Borghese
- Caroline Cellier
- Cheik Doukouré
- Colette Brosset
- Daniel Gélin
- Daniel Gélin
- Daniel Ivernel
- Danièle Delorme
- Delphine Depardieu
- Dominique Pinon
- Edwige Feuillère
- Emmanuel Curtil
- Éva Darlan
- Francis Huster
- François Périer
- Françoise Cadol
- Gérard Barray
- Isaach de Bankolé
- Jean Lefebvre
- Jean Reno
- Jean-François Poron
- Judith Magre
- Julie Dray
- Kyan Khojandi
- Liina Brunelle
- Louis de Funès
- Maria Pacôme
- Marie-José Nat
- Marie-Pierre Casey
- Marie-Pierre Casey
- Mathilde Ollivier
- Michel Piccoli
- Michel Serrault
- Michèle Morgan
- Mylène Demongeot
- Noémie Nakai
- Popeck
- Quentin Dolmaire
- Régis Laspalès
- Robert Hossein
- Serge Reggiani
- Thierry Liagre
- Timité Bassori
- Xavier Letourneur
- Xavier Robic
