= Hades (film) =

1995 film

- Directed by: Herbert Achternbusch
- Produced by: Steffen Kuchenreuther; Thomas Kuchenreuther
- Starring: Herbert Achternbusch
- Cinematography: Adam Olech
- Release date: February 1995
- Running time: 86 minutes
- Country: Germany
- Language: German

Hades is a 1995 German drama film directed by and starring Herbert Achternbusch. It was entered into the 45th Berlin International Film Festival.

== Cast ==
- Herbert Achternbusch as Hades
- Eckhard Dilssner as Polizist
- Barbara Gass
- Jens Harzer
- Irm Hermann
- Thomas Holtzmann
- Simone Katz
- Maxim Kisselev
- Laura Olivi
- Dagmar Sachse
- Bernhard Wildegger
- Rosel Zech
