= Winter Journey (2006 film) =

- Film poster
- German: Winterreise
- Directed by: Hans Steinbichler
- Starring: Josef Bierbichler; Sibel Kekilli
- Distributed by: X Verleih AG (though Warner Bros.)
- Release date: 5 July 2006 (KVIFF)
- Running time: 99 minutes
- Country: Germany
- Language: German

Winter Journey (German: Winterreise) is a 2006 German drama film directed by Hans Steinbichler.

== Cast ==
- Josef Bierbichler as Franz Brenninger
- Sibel Kekilli as Leyla
- Hanna Schygulla as Martha "Mucky" Brenninger
- Philipp Hochmair as Xaver Brenninger
- Anna Schudt as Paula Brenninger
- Johann von Bülow as Holger 'Sparkasse' Mankewski
- André Hennicke as Friedländer
- Brigitte Hobmeier as Jacqueline
- Aloysius Itoka as Tom Kanabe
- Stephan Bissmeier as Notar
- Stefan Merki as Arzt
- Klaus Manchen as Botschafter
- Martin Goeres as Assistent des Botschafters
