= Kurt Raab =

West German stage and film actor

- Born: 20 July 1941; Bergreichenstein, Germany (now Kašperské Hory, Czech Republic)
- Died: 28 June 1988 (aged 46); Hamburg, West Germany
- Years active: 1960s–1988

Kurt Raab (20 July 1941 – 28 June 1988) was a West German stage and film actor, as well as a screenwriter and playwright. Raab is best remembered for his work with German film director Rainer Werner Fassbinder, with whom he collaborated on 31 film projects.

== Biography ==
Raab was born in Bergreichenstein, which is now Kašperské Hory, Czech Republic. He completed the abitur at Musische Gymnasium Straubing, and studied in Munich.

He made his cinema debut in Fassbinder's Liebe ist kälter als der Tod (Love Is Colder than Death) in 1969. Over the next few years, he made numerous films with Fassbinder, including Warum läuft Herr R. Amok? (Why Does Herr R. Run Amok?) and Der Amerikanische Soldat (The American Soldier) in 1970, Warnung vor einer heiligen Nutte (Beware of a Holy Whore) in 1971, and Der Händler der vier Jahreszeiten (The Merchant of Four Seasons) in 1972.

He also worked as a production designer, assistant director, producer, and a screenwriter.

On 28 June 1988, at age 46, Raab died of AIDS-related complications. Before Raab died, he worked to raise awareness about HIV/AIDS in West Germany. In 1987, he discussed his illness in Herbert Achternbusch's Wohin?, a film about AIDS hysteria. In 1988, he made Mitten im Leben, a documentary about AIDS, for Zweites Deutsches Fernsehen. However, the illness remained poorly understood and Raab was placed in quarantine-like conditions in the Hamburg Tropical Institute. While confined to a hospital bed, Raab and his friend Hans Hirschmüller compiled the documentary Sehnsucht Nach Sodom, in which they explored "subjects as taboo as AIDS, death and the Catholicism of a gay person." Sehnsucht was released posthumously in 1989.

Prejudice about AIDS was also evident when Raab's body was refused burial in Steinbeißen, the Lower Bavarian town in which his family had settled in 1945. He is buried in Ohlsdorf Cemetery in Hamburg.

== Filmography ==
Year	Title	English title	Role	Notes
1969	Liebe ist kälter als der Tod	Love Is Colder Than Death	Aufsichtsperson im Kaufhaus	
1970	Götter der Pest	Gods of the Plague	Gast in der Kneipe	Uncredited
1970	Das Kaffeehaus	The Coffee Shop	Don Marzio	TV movie
1970	Warum läuft Herr R. Amok?	Why Does Herr R. Run Amok?	Herr R	
1970	Der Amerikanische Soldat	The American Soldier	Ricky's brother	
1970	Niklashauser Fart	The Niklashausen Journey	Bishop	TV movie
1970	Weg vom Fenster	n/a	Erster Erzieher	TV movie
1971	Rio das Mortes	Rio das Mortes	Tankwart	TV movie
1971	Mathias Kneissl	Mathias Kneissl	Fritz Rechthaler, Jungbauer	
1971	Whity	Whity	The Pianist	Uncredited
1971	Warnung vor einer heiligen Nutte	Beware of a Holy Whore	Fred	
1971	Die Ahnfrau - Oratorium nach Franz Grillparzer	n/a	Pfarrer	TV movie
1972	Händler der vier Jahreszeiten	The Merchant of Four Seasons	Kurt	
1972	Wildwechsel	Jail Bait	Factory Boss	TV movie
1972	Bremer Freiheit	Bremen Freedom	Carpenter	TV movie
1972–1973	Acht Stunden sind kein Tag	Eight Hours Don't Make a Day	Harald	4 episodes
1973	Zärtlichkeit der Wölfe	The Tenderness of Wolves	Fritz Haarmann	
1973	Welt am Draht	World on a Wire	Mark Holm	2 episodes
1974	Angst essen Seele auf	Ali: Fear Eats the Soul	Car Mechanic	Uncredited
1974	Die Verrohung des Franz Blum	The Brutalisation of Franz Blum	Wupke, prison guard	
1974	Martha	Martha	Secretary	TV movie
1974	Der Verfolger	n/a	n/a	TV movie
1974	Effi Briest	Effi Briest	Apotheker Gieshübler	Voice
1975	Münchner Geschichten	n/a	Peter Pickl	TV movie
1975	Wie ein Vogel auf dem Draht	Like a Bird on a Wire	Barbesucher	TV movie, Uncredited
1975	Faustrecht der Freiheit	Fox and His Friends	Wodka-Peter	
1975	Mutter Küsters Fahrt zum Himmel	Mother Küsters' Trip to Heaven	Barbesitzer Gustav	
1975	Angst vor der Angst	Fear of Fear	Herr Bauer	TV movie
1976	Die Atlantikschwimmer	The Atlantic Swimmers	Polizist	
1976	Satansbraten	Satan's Brew	Walter Kranz	
1977	Eierdiebe	Petty Thieves	n/a	
1977	Adolf und Marlene	Adolf and Marlene	Führer	
1977	Gruppenbild mit Dame	Group Portrait with a Lady	Parteifunktionär	
1977	Bolwieser	The Stationmaster's Wife	Xaver Ferdinand Maria Bolwieser - Station Master	TV movie
1977	Belcanto oder Darf eine Nutte schluchzen?	n/a	Arthur	
1978	Leidenschaftliche Blümchen	Preppy School Girls	Fletcher	
1979	Victor	n/a	Ein Zirkusansager	TV movie
1979	Der Durchdreher	It Can Only Get Worse	Mann von Glorias Freundin	
1979	Die Buddenbrooks	The Buddenbrooks	n/a	TV series
1979	Bildnis einer Trinkerin	Ticket of No Return	Chef	
1979	Der Sturz	n/a	Theopont Dirlewanger	
1979–1980	Der ganz normale Wahnsinn	n/a	Franz	5 episodes
1980	Warum die UFOs unseren Salat klauen	Why the UFOs Steal Our Lettuce	Film-Hitler	
1980	Unter Verschluß	Under Lock and Key	n/a	TV movie
1980	Endstation Freiheit	Slow Attack	Maria Franz Beekenbrandt	
1981	Total vereist	Totally Frozen	Herr Münch	
1981	Engel aus Eisen	Angels of Iron	Chauffeur	
1981	Exil	n/a	Heilbrunn	2 episodes
1981	Wie die Weltmeister	n/a	Oberamtmann	
1981	Heute spielen wir den Boß	n/a	Reichenstein	
1981	Frankfurt Kaiserstraße	Frankfurt: The Face of a City	Onkel Ossi	
1981	Sechsunddreißig Stunden	n/a	n/a	TV movie
1981	Feuer und Schwert - Die Legende von Tristan und Isolde	Fire and Sword	Ganelon	
1981	Die Fahrt nach Schlangenbad	n/a	Alfred Wittkowsky	TV movie
1981	Der glücklose Mann	n/a	n/a	TV movie
1982	Bekenntnisse des Hochstaplers Felix Krull	The Confessions of Felix Krull	Sally Meerschaum	5 episodes
1982	Liebeskonzil	Council of Love	Gerichtspräsident	
1982	Der Zauberberg	The Magic Mountain	Dr. Krokowski	
1982	Ich werde warten	I'll Be Waiting	Herr Dankert	TV movie
1982	Die Komplizen	n/a	Marcel Lambert	Episode: "Mein kleiner Betrüger/Das Haus des Colonels/Tschüs, Charlie!/Schmerzlose Behandlung/Schabernack mit einer alten Frau"
1982	Das Gespenst	The Ghost	Poli	
1982	Dr. Margarete Johnsohn	n/a	Herr Körber	TV movie
1983	Die Insel der blutigen Plantage	Escape from Blood Plantation	Pevney	
1983	Der Zappler	The Twitcher	Nachbar	
1983	Derrick	n/a	Butler	Episode: "Via Genua"
1983	Bella Donna	n/a	n/a	
1983	Die Olympiasiegerin	n/a	n/a	
1983	Hauptsache konsequent	n/a	n/a	TV movie
1983	Traumlage	n/a	Fellner	TV movie
1983	Krimistunde	n/a	n/a	TV series
1983	Bolero	n/a	Rado	
1984	Tricheurs	Cheaters	Jorg	
1984	Humus	n/a	Horst	Short
1984	Rambo Zambo	n/a	n/a	TV movie
1984	Abwärts	Out of Order	Elevator mechanic	
1984	Der Rekord	The Record	P.K. Wütrich	
1984	Im Himmel ist die Hölle los	n/a	Intendant	
1984	Die Schwarzen Brüder	n/a	Man with scar	TV mini-series
1985	Kleine Stadt, ich liebe dich	n/a	n/a	TV mini-series
1985	Bittere Ernte	Angry Harvest	Maslanka	
1985	Parker	Bones	Haag	
1985	Franz Xaver Brunnmayr	n/a	n/a	Episode: "Das Palais"
1985	Der Formel Eins Film	Feel the Motion	Mephisto	
1985	Mussolini: The Decline and Fall of Il Duce	Mussolini and I	Hitler	3 episodes
1986	Transitträume	n/a	Kaderleiter	
1986	Miko – Aus der Gosse zu den Sternen	Miko: From the Gutter to the Stars	Walter Hahn	
1986	Motten im Licht	n/a	Brenner	
1986	Rette mich, wer kann	n/a	1. Geige	Episode: "Kulturpause"
1986	Kir Royal	n/a	Michel, butler	Episode: "Das Volk sieht nichts"
1986	Schloßherren	n/a	n/a	TV series
1986	Das Totenreich	n/a	John Hagen	TV movie
1987	Escape from Sobibor	Escape from Sobibor	Commandant Frenzel	TV movie
1987	Das Rätsel der Sandbank	The Riddle of the Sands	Underwood	TV movie, Uncredited
1987	Der elegante Hund	n/a	n/a	TV series
1988	Wohin?	n/a	Gast	
1989	Reporter	n/a	n/a	TV series, (final appearance)
