= Herbert Achternbusch =

German writer, painter and filmmaker (1938–2022)

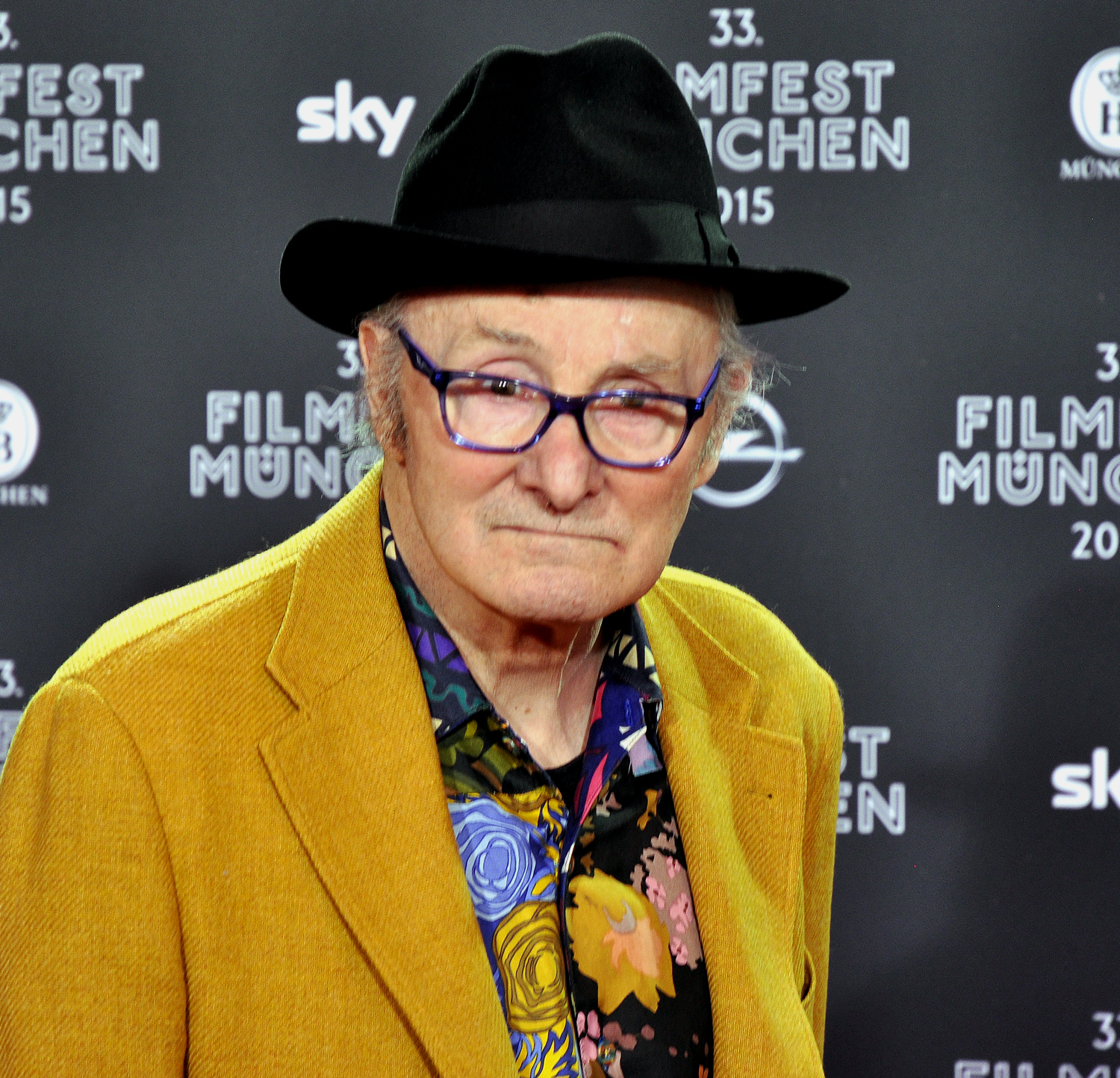
- Achternbusch in 2015
- Born: Herbert Schild; 23 November 1938; Munich, Nazi Germany
- Died: 10 January 2022 (aged 83); Munich, Germany
- Occupations: Film director; writer; painter
- Years active: 1971–2002
- Awards: Mülheimer Dramatikerpreis; Kassel Literary Prize

Herbert Achternbusch (né Schild; 23 November 1938 – 10 January 2022) was a German film director, writer and painter. He began as a writer of avant-garde prose, such as the novel Die Alexanderschlacht, before turning to low-budget films. He had a love-hate relationship with Bavaria which showed itself in his work. Some of his controversial films, such as Das Gespenst (The Ghost), were presented at the Berlinale festival.

== Biography ==
Born Herbert Schild in 1938 in Munich, Achternbusch was the illegitimate son of the sports teacher Luise Schild, née Muckenthaler, and the dental technician Adolf Achternbusch. He grew up in the Bavarian Forest with his grandmother. In 1960, he was adopted by his biological father and took the name Achternbusch. After his Abitur in Cham, he studied at the Academy of Fine Arts, Nuremberg, and at the Academy of Fine Arts, Munich.

In the early 1970s, Achternbusch wrote the prose Die Alexanderschlacht, an important novel for the literary avant-garde of the time. Achternbusch produced almost 30 low budget films. He was often the leading actor in his films, and worked mainly with friends. In 1975, Achternbusch met actor Josef Bierbichler, who played in 15 of his films, partly without salary. Also notable were the actresses Annamirl Bierbichler and Margarethe von Trotta, as well as actor and painter Heinz Braun and cinematographer Jörg Schmidt-Reitwein. In 1974, he made his film debut with Das Andechser Gefühl. The 1977 film Bierkampf (Beerfight) caused attention with numerous drunk Oktoberfest visitors as involuntary amateur actors. Role models are the comedians Karl Valentin and Groucho Marx. His anarchist surrealistic films are not known to a wide audience in Germany, although one of them, Das Gespenst (The Ghost), caused a scandal in 1983 because of its alleged blasphemous contents, including a scene where Christ climbs down from the cross and later goes bathing with a nun. Federal Minister of the Interior Friedrich Zimmermann halted the funding for the film as it was deemed to have violated the "religious feeling of large parts of the population". For a long time, no public broadcaster showed any of Achternbusch's films. Years of legal battle ensued, with Achternbusch finally winning in 1992. In the 1983 film Der Depp, he had his favorite enemy Franz Josef Strauss poisoned.

In 2002, Achternbusch stopped making films. In 2008, the Munich Film Festival dedicated a retrospective to him, and on the occasion of his 80th birthday, the Munich Film Museum paid tribute with eight of his feature films and a film portrait.

Achternbusch was also prolific as a writer and painter, producing 20 plays, 40 books, and hundreds of paintings. The first English language translation of his written works appeared in 2024 with a compilation entitled The Olympic Champion. It includes four "filmbooks" and two plays. "Filmbook" is the word used to describe the unique, quasi-novelistic form in which Achternbusch wrote works for both publication (whether alone or within a larger volume) and filming. His large-format paintings have been described as child-like, expressive, and "naively excessive". For his 70th birthday, the Museum of Modern Art Passau made an exhibition of his works. His plays were present on German stages, such as his two-person play Gust at the Munich Kammerspiele in 1986, and his last play Dogtown Munich at the Münchner Volkstheater in 2017. He was also a theatre director. Werner Herzog, a director of the New German Cinema, based his film Heart of Glass on a story by Achternbusch. Achternbusch wrote novels, poetry, children's books and also theatre reviews for the German newspaper Süddeutsche Zeitung.

== Personal life and death ==
Achternbusch was the father of six children with three women. In 1959, his daughter Eva was born. The child's mother was a classmate. In 1962, during his studies, Achternbusch met Gerda Oberpaul, whom he married in November. The children from that marriage were Rut (born 1963), Andreas (born 1964), Rita (born 1966), and Judit (born 1968). They divorced in 1982. From 1985 to 1993, Achternsbusch's partner and actress in 20 of his films was Annamirl Bierbichler, sister of Josef Bierbichler. In the 1980s, they lived together in a commune in Ambach, Lake Starnberg. From 1990 onward, Achternbusch lived on Munich's Burgstraße. From 1993 to 1997, he was married to the actress Judith Tobschall. Their daughter is the actress Naomi (born 1994). He had a love-hate relationship with his homeland of Bavaria.

Achternbusch eventually withdrew from public life, and died in Munich on 10 January 2022, at the age of 83. Federal President Frank-Walter Steinmeier described Achternbusch in a letter of condolence as a "unique universal artist" and that he "invaluably enriched the German cultural landscape, also because he provoked and polarized".

== Awards ==
Achternbusch was awarded the German international literary Petrarca-Preis in 1977, but he declined the honor. He burned the prize check after accepting it and left the event. He won the Mülheimer Dramatikerpreis in 1986 and 1994. In 1996, Achternbusch refused to personally receive the Friedrich Wilhelm Murnau Film Award in Bielefeld. In 2010, he was awarded the Kassel Literary Prize.

== Films ==
- In 1981, he directed the film Der Neger Erwin, which was entered into the 31st Berlin International Film Festival.
- In 1982, he directed Das Gespenst (The Ghost), in which he and family members also performed as actors. It was presented at the 33rd Berlin International Film Festival.
- In 1988, he directed Wohin? (38th Berlin International Film Festival).
- In 1995, he directed Hades (45th Berlin International Film Festival).

== Writings ==
- Die Alexanderschlacht (in German). Frankfurt am Main: Suhrkamp. 1972. ISBN 978-3-518-36561-8. OCLC 11319713.
- L'Etat c'est moi (in German). Frankfurt am Main: Suhrkamp. 1972. ISBN 978-3-518-10551-1. OCLC 4057774.
- Der Tag wird kommen (in German). Frankfurt am Main: Suhrkamp. 1973. ISBN 978-3-518-02030-2. OCLC 850738.
- Die Stunde des Todes (in German). Frankfurt am Main: Suhrkamp Verlag. 1977. ISBN 978-3-518-06949-3. OCLC 8279906.
- Ich bin ein Schaf : Memoiren (in German). München: Goldmann. 1996. ISBN 978-3-442-30685-5. OCLC 34894645.
- The Olympic Champion : and other selected works (English translations of Der Comanche, Kuschwarda City, Susn, Die Olympiasiegerin, Das letzte Loch, and Der Depp). Kitchener: Editions Cox. 2024. ISBN 978-3-9826294-0-7. OL 52201624M.
