= Faro, Goddess of the Waters =

- Directed by: Salif Traoré
- Screenplay by: Salif Traoré, Olivier Lorelle
- Produced by: Sarama Films, DCN, Canal Horizons, PAV Communication, Bärbel Mauch Films
- Starring: Sotigui Kouyate; Fili Traore; Michel Mpambara; Habib Dembele; Maimouna Hélène Diarra
- Cinematography: Jean-Pierre Gauthier
- Edited by: Laure Budin
- Music by: Bassékou Kouyaté
- Release date: 2007
- Running time: 96 minutes
- Countries: Mali, France, Canada, Burkina Faso, Germany
- Language: Bambara

Faro, Goddess of the Waters is a 2007 film.

== Synopsis ==
Zanga, a child born out of wedlock, is driven out of his village. After many years, he returns to find out who is father is. At the moment of his arrival, something happens that the villagers interpret as the river spirit Faro's angry reaction to the bastard’s coming.

== Awards ==
- Namur 2007
