= Voyage à Ouaga =

2001 Congolese-French thriller film

- Directed by: Camille Mouyéké
- Written by: Camille Mouyéké
- Produced by: Maka Kotto; Xavier Letourneur; Aïssa Maïga; Elena Zoubkou
- Starring: Eric Laugérias; Maka Kotto; Xavier Letourneur; Aïssa Maïga; René Morard
- Cinematography: Jean-Michel Humeau
- Edited by: Odile Bonis; Catherine Renault
- Music by: Michel Montoyat
- Production company: Allison Productions
- Distributed by: Allison Productions
- Release date: 2001 (Burkina Faso)
- Running time: 90 minutes
- Countries: Congo; France
- Language: French

Voyage à Ouaga, is a 2001 Congolese-French drama thriller film directed by Camille Mouyéké and co-produced by Maka Kotto, Xavier Letourneur, Aïssa Maïga and Elena Zoubkou. The film stars Eric Laugérias in the lead role whereas Maka Kotto, Xavier Letourneur, Aïssa Maïga and René Morard made supportive roles. The film revolves around Lionel, a young Frenchman, who lost everything after having just arrived in Cotonou, Benin during the riots in the city.

The film made its premier in 2001. The film received mixed reviews from critics and screened at many film festivals. In the same year, the film won the Audience Award at the Namur International Festival of French-Speaking Film. Then the film won the Award of the City of Ouagadougou at the Panafrican Film and Television Festival of Ouagadougou (FESPACO).

== Cast ==
- Eric Laugérias as Lionel
- Maka Kotto as Zao
- Xavier Letourneur as Marcel
- Aïssa Maïga as Loutaya
- René Morard as Max
- Tom Ouedraogo as Sékou
- Bénédicte Roy as Victoria
