= Liina Brunelle =

Estonian-born French actress

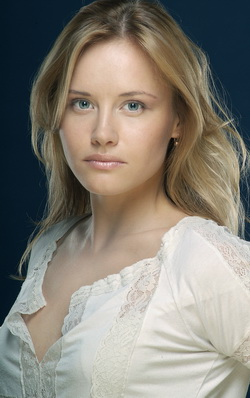
- Liina Brunelle, 2006
- Born: Liina Paukku; October 12, 1978 (age 47); Kohtla-Järve, then part of Estonian SSR, Soviet Union
- Occupation: Actress
- Years active: 2004 – present

Liina Brunelle (born October 12, 1978) is an Estonian-born French actress.

Although born in Estonia, Russian is her first language. She also speaks French, English, Swedish, and German.

== Cinema ==
- 2005 : Paris, je t'aime, by Olivier Assayas, Frédéric Auburtin and Sylvain Chomet
- 2006 : Madame Irma, by Didier Bourdon
- 2007 : Eden Log, by Franck Vestiel
- 2007 : Modern Love, by Stéphane Kazandjian
- 2008 : Le Missionnaire, by Roger Delattre
- 2008 : Celle que j'aime, by Élie Chouraqui

== Television ==
- 2004 : Advertisement for Société Générale directed by Gérard Jugnot
- 2005 : La Légende vraie de la tour Eiffel, by Simon Brook
- 2005 : Advertisement for Mediavista directed by Pascal Sid and Julien Lacombe
- 2006 : Le Soiring, comic show for TPS Star
- 2008 : Drôle de Noël !, by Nicolas Picard
- 2008 : R.I.S, police scientifique, by Klaus Biedermann

== Theatre ==
- 2001 : A Marriage Proposal (in Russian), by Anton Chekhov
- 2006 : Theatre experiences : Crime and Punishment by Fyodor Dostoyevsky, Miss Julie by August Strindberg, The Tidings Brought To Mary by Paul Claudel
- 2007 : Richard III n'aura pas lieu, by Matei Vișniec, directed by David Sztulman in the Théâtre du Gymnase : Tania (female main role)
- 2008 : Richard III n'aura pas lieu in the Ciné 13 Théâtre

== Education ==
- 2004 - 2007 : Theatre education in the Cours Simon (Paris)
