= Camille Mouyéké =

Rwandan actress

- Born: Camille Mouyéké; 16 March 1962 (age 64); Congo
- Education: Paris 8 University Vincennes-Saint-Denis
- Occupations: Director, Screenwriter
- Years active: 1991–present

Camille Mouyéké (born 16 March 1962), is a Congolese filmmaker and screenwriter. He is best known for directing the award-winning 2001 thriller film Voyage à Ouaga.

== Personal life ==
He was born on 16 March 1962 in Congo. He studied Cinema at the Paris 8 University Vincennes-Saint-Denis and later in 1993, he obtained his Master's degree from the same university. He is the last Congolese to get a scholarship from the government to be trained in cinema and to go to study film.

== Career ==
He started film career by directing many popular short films such as Police Violence (1993), The Fire Proof (1995), and The Mavericks (1998). After returning to Congo from Paris, he obtained a fund from the Organisation Internationale de la Francophonie (OIF), where he started to train the young generation towards filmmaking. Later he expanded the workshop and established the production company called "Hortense Films".

In 2001, he directed the film Voyage à Ouaga which received positive reviews from critics and later screened at various film festivals. In the meantime, the film also won two awards: the Audience Award at the Namur International Festival of French-Speaking Film and the Award of the City of Ouagadougou at the Panafrican Film and Television Festival of Ouagadougou (FESPACO). After the success of the film, he started his second feature film in 2012 which was shot in Namibia. Meanwhile, he also developed a cinema project called "Namib Cinema" in the city of Point Noire, Congo.

== Filmography ==
Year	Film	Role	Genre	Ref.
1993	Police Violence	Director	Short film	
1995	The Fire Proof	Director	Short film	
1998	The Mavericks	Director	Short film	
2001	Voyage à Ouaga	Director	Film	
2005	La Danse des infidèles	Director	Short film	
