= Hans Steinbichler =

German film director and screenwriter (born 1966)

- Born: 1 November 1966 (age 59); Solothurn, Switzerland
- Occupations: Film director, screenwriter
- Years active: 2011–present

Hans Sebastian Steinbichler (born 1 November 1966) is a German film director and screenwriter.

== Biography ==
Steinbichler grew up in Kothöd in Upper Bavaria. He got his Abitur at the Ludwig-Thoma-Gymnasium Prien am Chiemsee. Then he studied jurisprudence in Passau first, but in 1995 he decided to attend the University of Television and Film Munich, where he finished his studies in 2003.

In the same year, Steinbichler was awarded with the Förderpreis Deutscher Film and the golden Grimme-Preis for his debut film Hierankl. The leading actress Johanna Wokalek won the Bavarian Film Award. In 2007, Steinbichlers film Winter Journey got several nominations for the Deutscher Filmpreis and Die zweite Frau was awarded with the Grimme-Preis. Furthermore, Autistic Disco was nominated for the Förderpreis Deutscher Film on the Munich Film Festival. Two years later, Steinbichler contributed episode 11 (Fraktur) to the anthology film Germany 09, which showed the situation in Germany at that time. In 2011, Steinbichler's melodramatic film Promising the Moon was awarded with the Bavarian Film Award.

From January 2013 to December 2014, Steinbichler worked as a professor for directing in cinema, TV and new media at the Internationale Filmschule Köln. In 2015, he was the director of Das Tagebuch der Anne Frank, a film about the Holocaust victim Anne Frank and her diary.

== Filmography ==
- 1996: Abstieg (screenwriter and director)
- 1999: Verspiegelte Zeit – Erinnerungen an Angelika Schrobsdorff (screenwriter and director)
- 2000: Die Germaniker – Römisch-Deutsche Karrieren (screenwriter and director)
- 2003: Der Moralist – Vittorio Hösle entdeckt Amerika (screenwriter and director)
- 2003: Inseln im Chiemsee (screenwriter and director)
- 2003: Hierankl (screenwriter and director)
- 2006: Bella Block – Mord unterm Kreuz (director)
- 2006: Winter Journey (screenwriter and director)
- 2007: Autistic Disco (director)
- 2008: My Mother, My Bride and I (director)
- 2009: Fraktur (episode of the anthology film Germany 09)
- 2011: Promising the Moon (director)
- 2011: Polizeiruf 110 – Denn sie wissen nicht, was sie tun (director)
- 2012: Polizeiruf 110 – Schuld (director)
- 2013: Hattinger und die kalte Hand – Ein Chiemseekrimi (director)
- 2014: A Life For Football (director)
- 2015: Village of Silence (director)
- 2016: Das Tagebuch der Anne Frank (director)
- 2016: The Unheard Woman (director)
