= Esther Madudu =

Ugandan midwife (born 1980)

- Born: 1980 (age 45–46)
- Occupation: Midwife

Esther Madudu (Born in 1980) is a Ugandan midwife. Madudu has had nearly 15 years of experience first at a maternity home in Kumi District, and now working at Tiriri Health Center IV in Uganda.

== Early life and education ==
Esther Madudu was the second of ten children. In her earlier years, she attended Lwala Girls School in Kaberamaido District. She then went to Jinja School of Nursing and Midwifery. Esther Madudu’s career was inspired by her grandmother who attended to pregnant women in their home and also advised Madudu to get an education.

== Career ==
Madudu began working at a maternity home in Kumi district, but now works at Tiriri Health Center IV. The duties for midwives include prenatal services for the mothers, providing HIV counseling, education about nutrition; maternity services, including delivery; as well as postnatal care. Madudu herself has delivered over two thousand babies in the past decade.

== Awards and recognition ==
1. The Outstanding Achievement Award 2013/2014 - among the most prestigious awards for health workers in Uganda awarded by the Ugandan Minister for Health, Dr Elioda Tumwesigye.
2. She received the Global REAL Award in 2013, based on nomination by AMREF U.S. The REAL Awards are fronted by the Bill & Melinda Gates Foundation, the Frontline Health Workers Coalition and Save the Children USA. These awards recognize frontline health workers in the US and around the world who are protecting health and saving lives daily.
3. On Monday, 25 November 2013, - to mark the International Day for the Elimination of Violence against Women - Esther Madudu was awarded the National Order of Merit (France)

== Nobel Peace Prize Petition ==
The petition to nominate Esther Madudu for the 2015 Nobel Peace Prize was sparked by her long track record as a midwife, and activist, particularly her activist work with AMREF's Stand Up for African Mothers campaign. For Madudu, it would have been a symbolic nomination of all African midwives. Amref Health Africa as well as various other organizations and individuals lobbied to raise the 100,000 signatures required for nomination.

== Media and publications ==
- Huffington Post, 2013 The World Needs More Midwives
- BBC, The Conversation:Esther Madudu
- CNN, Midwife Stands Up for African Mothers
