= La Vie Sur Terre =

- Directed by: Abderrahmane Sissako
- Written by: Abderrahmane Sissako
- Starring: Abderrahmane Sissako; Nana Baby; Mohamed Sissako
- Cinematography: Jacques Besse
- Edited by: Nadia Ben Rachid
- Distributed by: California Newsreel; Haut et Court (France)
- Release date: June 9, 1999 (France)
- Running time: 61 minutes
- Countries: Mali; Mauritania; France
- Languages: French; Bambara

La Vie Sur Terre (Life on Earth) is a 1998 Malian comedy/drama film written and directed by, and starring Abderrahmane Sissako. It is set in the village of Sokolo and depicts rural life on the eve of the 21st century. Runtime is 61 minutes. The film was made for the 2000, Seen By... project, initiated by the French company Haut et Court to produce films depicting the approaching turn of the millennium seen from the perspectives of 10 countries.

The film earned Sissako awards at the Fribourg International Film Festival, the Ouagadougou Panafrican Film and Television Festival and the San Francisco International Film Festival.
