= Bamako (film) =

- French theatrical release poster
- Directed by: Abderrahmane Sissako
- Written by: Abderrahmane Sissako
- Produced by: [Denis Freyd; Abderrahmane Sissako
- Starring: Aïssa Maïga; Tiécoura Traoré; Hélène Diarra; Habib Dembélé
- Cinematography: Jacques Besse
- Edited by: Nadia Ben Rachid; Pauline Casalis
- Production companies: Archipel 33; Arte France Cinéma; Chinguitty Films; Louverture Films; Mali Images; New Yorker Films
- Distributed by: Les Films du Losange (France); New Yorker Films (US)
- Release dates: 21 May 2006 (Cannes); 18 October 2006 (France); 14 February 2007 (United States)
- Running time: 115 minutes
- Countries: Mali; France; United States
- Languages: French; Bambara
- Budget: $2 million
- Box office: $1.6 million

Bamako is a 2006 docudrama film written and directed by Abderrahmane Sissako. It depicts a fictional trial in a backyard, in the outskirts of Bamako, about the role of the World Bank and the IMF in Africa's poverty. It stars Aïssa Maïga, Tiécoura Traoré, Hélène Diarra, Habib Dembélé and Djénéba Koné.

The film had its world premiere out of competition of the 2006 Cannes Film Festival on 21 May, where it received positive reviews. It was theatrically released in France by Les Films du Losange on 18 October, and in the United States by New Yorker Films on 14 February 2007.

== Synopsis ==
The film depicts a trial taking place in Bamako, the capital of Mali, amid the daily life that is going on in the city. In the midst of that trial, two sides argue whether the World Bank and International Monetary Fund are guided by special interests of developed nations, or whether it is corruption and the individual nations' mismanagement, that is guilty of the current financial state of many poverty-stricken African countries as well as the rest of the poor undeveloped world. It also addresses the everlasting effects of the European colonization and discusses how it plays a role in shaping African societies.

== Cast ==
- Aïssa Maïga as Melé
- Tiécoura Traoré as Chaka
- Hélène Diarra as Saramba
- Habib Dembélé as Falaï
- Djénéba Koné as Chaka's sister
- Hamadoun Kassogué as Le journaliste
- Mamadou Kanouté as defense lawyer
- Gabriel Magma Konate as the prosecutor
- Hamèye Mahalmadane as the tribunal president
- Aminata Traoré as witness
- William Bourdon as himself (lawyer)
- Aïssata Tall Sall as herself (lawyer)
- Danny Glover as himself
- Elia Suleiman as himself
- Abderrahmane Sissako as Dramane Sissako
- Zeka Laplaine as himself
- Jean-Henri Roger as himself
- Alou Diarra
- Issa Doumbia
- Samba Diakité
- Youssouf Kamara
- Abdoulaye Coulibaly
- Lamine Camara
- Abdoulaye Kouyaté
- Aissata Tall Sall
- Mohamed Sissoko
- Souleymane Tounkara

== Production ==
Danny Glover, one of the film's executive producers, also guest-stars as an actor in a Western film (called Death in Timbuktu) that some children are watching on the television in one scene.

Lawyers William Bourdon and Aïssata Tall Sall portrayed themselves in the film.

== Accolades ==
Actress Aïssa Maïga was nominated for the César Award for Most Promising Actress in 2007.

Bamako was the recipient of the first Film Award of the Council of Europe (FACE) given at the Istanbul International Film Festival in April 2007. Bamako won the award for Best French-Language Film/Meilleur Film Francophone at the 12th Lumière Awards. Bamako was also the winner of the Audience Award at the Paris Cinema in 2006.

Salon critic Andrew O'Hehir selected the film when asked to present one film within the Maryland Film Festival in 2008.

== Reception ==
The film received a Metacritic score of 81 out of 100, and has a score of 85% on Rotten Tomatoes based on 54 reviews with the following consensus: "A courtroom drama and a portrait of everyday Mali life, Bamako approaches both subjects with equal skill and success." The film received much praise for its direction by Sissako.

Entertainment Weekly gave Bamako an A, calling it "a passionate, challenging drama from the fine Mauritanian writer-director Abderrahmane Sissako" and that it brings "moments of brimming, illogical, intimate neighborly dailiness the filmmaker also captures with warmth and infectious high spirits".

A. O. Scott from The New York Times said that "he has never seen a film quite like Bamako", and praised the director's vision as a "seething, complicated and a disarmingly beautiful investigation of Africa's social, economic and human crises" and goes on to describe the film as "something different, a work of cool intelligence and profound anger, a long, dense, argument that is also a haunting visual poem".

Michael Phillips of the Chicago Tribune in his review gave the film three and a half out of four, saying "Sissako has an unusual camera eye, patient and alert to the ebb and flow of both the courtroom sequences and the outside scenes. The music is wonderful as well."

Wesley Morris from the Boston Globe in an overwhelmingly positive review said "As demonstrated in his previous film, a plangent snapshot of subsistence called "Waiting for Happiness," Sissako is a poet, and the filmmaking in this new picture is stuff of a deserving laureate."

The Empire review gave the film four out of five and said that it is "Far from an easy watch, either in terms of its hard-hitting content, seemingly haphazard structuring or its dense symbolism. But this makes sense of the political intricacies by balancing the rhetoric and statistics with everyday occurrences that give the iniquities and inadequacies a human face."

The review in The Washington Post said "No one can deny the powerful reality that weaves its way through Bamako."

== See also ==
- Life and Debt
- Black Gold
- Confessions of an Economic Hit Man
