= Abderrahmane Sissako =

Mauritanian film director

- عبد الرحمن سيساكو
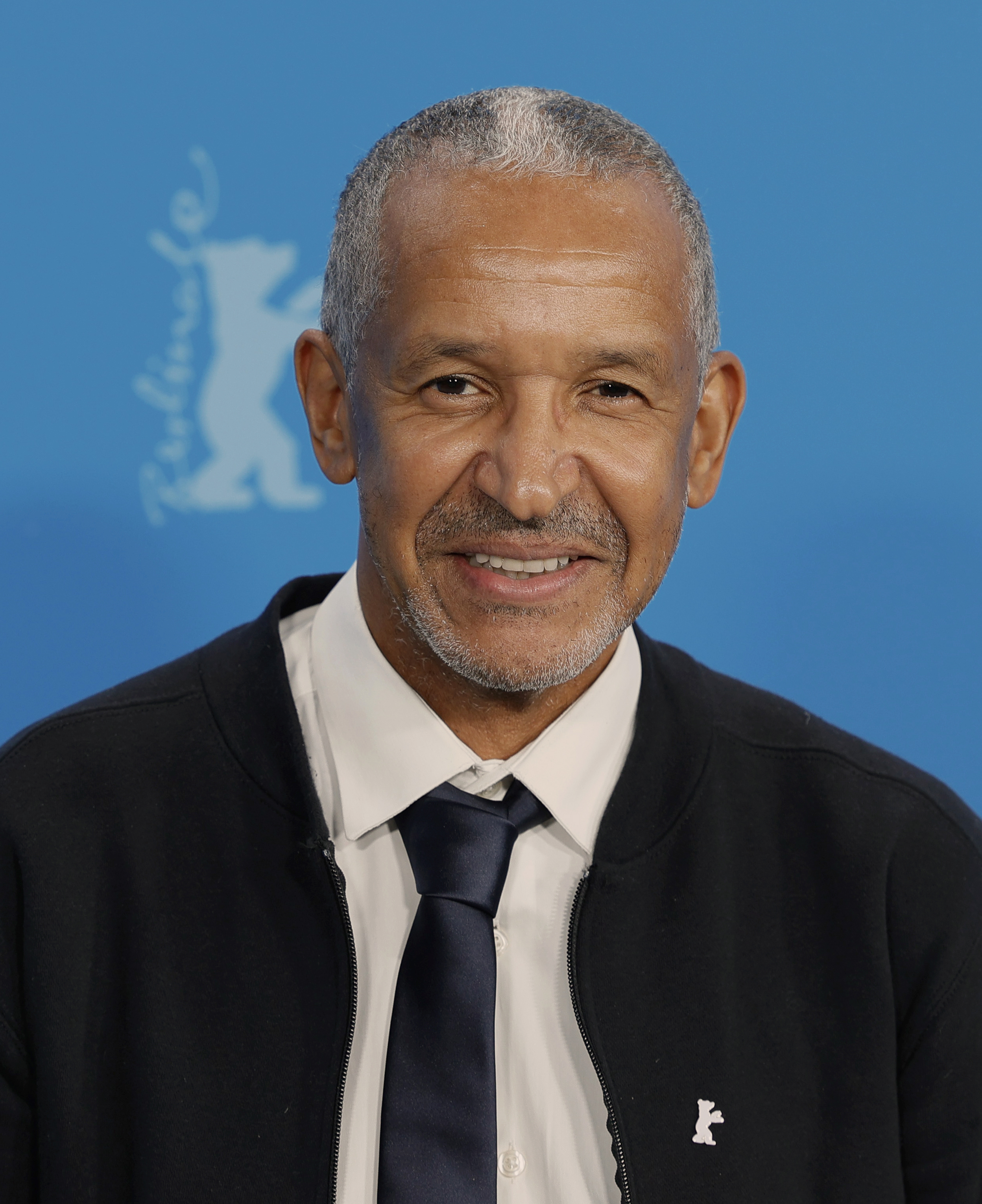
- Sissako in 2024
- Born: 13 October 1961 (age 64); Kiffa, Mauritania
- Occupations: Film director, screenwriter, producer

Abderrahmane Sissako (Arabic: عبد الرحمن سيساكو; born 13 October 1961) is a Mauritanian-born Malian film director and producer. His film Waiting for Happiness (Heremakono) was screened at the 2002 Cannes Film Festival official selection under Un Certain Regard, winning a FIPRESCI Prize. His 2006 film Bamako received much attention. Sissako's themes include globalisation, exile and the displacement of people. His 2014 film Timbuktu was selected to compete for the Palme d'Or in the main competition section at the 2014 Cannes Film Festival and nominated for an Academy Award for Best Foreign Language Film.

== Early life and education ==
Sissako was born in Kiffa, Mauritania, in 1961. His father is a Malian from Sokolo. He spent his childhood in Mali, then returned to Mauritania at age 18 to live with his mother. He left for Moscow in 1983 with a scholarship to study cinema at the Gerasimov Institute of Cinematography, where he made his graduation film, The Game, in 1988.

== Career ==
Besides his work as a director, he also worked as a cultural Advisor for former head of state Mohamed Ould Abdel Aziz.

In December 2023, alongside 50 other filmmakers, Sissako signed an open letter published in Libération demanding a ceasefire and an end to the killing of civilians amid the 2023 Israeli invasion of the Gaza Strip, and for a humanitarian corridor into Gaza to be established for humanitarian aid, and the release of hostages.

== Personal life ==
After twelve years in Moscow, Sissako moved to Paris in 1994.

Sissako is married to the Ethiopian film director Maji-da Abdi.

Sissako's mother died on the last day of filming of his 2002 film Waiting for Happiness; the film is dedicated to her.

== Filmography ==
Year	Title	Role	Notes
1990	Sex et perestroïka	Assistant director	Directed by François Jouffa & Francis Leroi
1991	Le jeu	Director & Writer	Short
1993	Oktyabr	Director & Writer	Short
1995	Petite météorologie ou Sept histoires de temps	Actor	Short directed by Charles Castella
1995	Molom, conte de Mongolie	Production designer	Directed by Marie-Jaoul de Poncheville
1997	Africa Dreaming	Director	TV series (1 Episode)
1997	Documenta X - Die Filme	Director	Directed with Charles Burnett, Harun Farocki and Aleksandr Sokurov
1997	Rostov-Luanda	Director & Writer	Documentary; Namur International Festival of French-Speaking Film - Best Documentary Award - Special Mention
1998	La Vie Sur Terre	Director, Writer & Actor	San Francisco International Film Festival - Golden Spire; Fribourg International Film Festival - Ecumenical Jury Award; Fribourg International Film Festival - FIPRESCI Prize - Special Mention; Fribourg International Film Festival - Grand Prix; Panafrican Film and Television Festival of Ouagadougou - Air Afrique Special Award; Panafrican Film and Television Festival of Ouagadougou - INALCO Award; Panafrican Film and Television Festival of Ouagadougou - Special Mention; Panafrican Film and Television Festival of Ouagadougou - TELCIPRO Award - Feature Film; Taormina Film Fest - Silver Charybdis
2002	Waiting for Happiness	Director & Writer	Cannes Film Festival - Foreign Cineaste of the Year; Cannes Film Festival - FIPRESCI Prize; Buenos Aires International Festival of Independent Cinema - Best Film; Gijón International Film Festival - Special Jury Award; Namur International Festival of French-Speaking Film - Youth Jury Emile Cantillon Award; Panafrican Film and Television Festival of Ouagadougou - Grand Prize - Etalon de Yennega; Paris Biennal of Arab Cinema - IMA Grand Prize; Nominated - Gijón International Film Festival - Grand Prix Asturias - Best Feature; Nominated - Namur International Festival of French-Speaking Film - Golden Bayard - Best Film
2002	Abouna	Executive producer	Directed by Mahamat Saleh Haroun
2003	Le silence de la forêt	Producer	Directed by Bassek Ba Kobhio & Didier Ouenangare
2003	Malenkie lyudi	Producer	Directed by Nariman Turebaev
2006	Bamako	Director, Writer, Producer & Actor	Lumière Award for Best French-Language Film; International Istanbul Film Festival - FACE Award; Festival Paris Cinéma - Audience Award
2006	Daratt	Producer	Directed by Mahamat Saleh Haroun
2008	8	Director & Writer	Directed with Jane Campion, Gael García Bernal, Jan Kounen, Mira Nair, Gaspar Noé, Gus Van Sant & Wim Wenders
2008	Stories on Human Rights	Director	Directed with Marina Abramović, Sergei Bodrov, Shira Geffen, Jia Zhangke, Etgar Keret, Idrissa Ouedraogo, Pipilotti Rist, Walter Salles, Apichatpong Weerasethakul, Jasmila Žbanić, and others
2010	Je vous souhaite la pluie	Director	TV Short
2014	Timbuktu	Director & Writer	César Award for Best Film; César Award for Best Director; César Award for Best Original Screenplay; Cannes Film Festival - François Chalais Prize; Cannes Film Festival - Prize of the Ecumenical Jury; Lumière Award for Best Film; Lumière Award for Best Director; Chicago International Film Festival - Best Director; Globes de Cristal Award - Best Film; African-American Film Critics Association - Best World Cinema; Jerusalem Film Festival - Best Feature; French Syndicate of Cinema Critics - Best Film; Grand Prix de l'UCC; Nominated - Academy Award for Best Foreign Language Film; Nominated - Cannes Film Festival - Palme d'Or; Nominated - Satellite Award for Best Foreign Language Film; Nominated - Cairo International Film Festival - Best Arabic Film; Nominated - Louis Delluc Prize - Best Film; Nominated - Hamburg Film Festival - Art Cinema Award
2024	Black Tea	Director & Writer	Nominated - 74th Berlin International Film Festival - Golden Bear

== Bibliography ==
- Thomas Sotinel, « Abderrahmane Sissako. Pour en finir avec le cinéma du Nord », Le Monde, 21 octobre 2006, p. 19
- Samuel Lelièvre, « Les cinémas africains, Abderrahmane Sissako et les frontières du monde », CinémAction, no. 137, 2010, pp. 182–185.
