= Operation Barkhane =

French military mission in Africa (2014–2022)

- Part of the Mali War, the War in the Sahel, and the war on terror
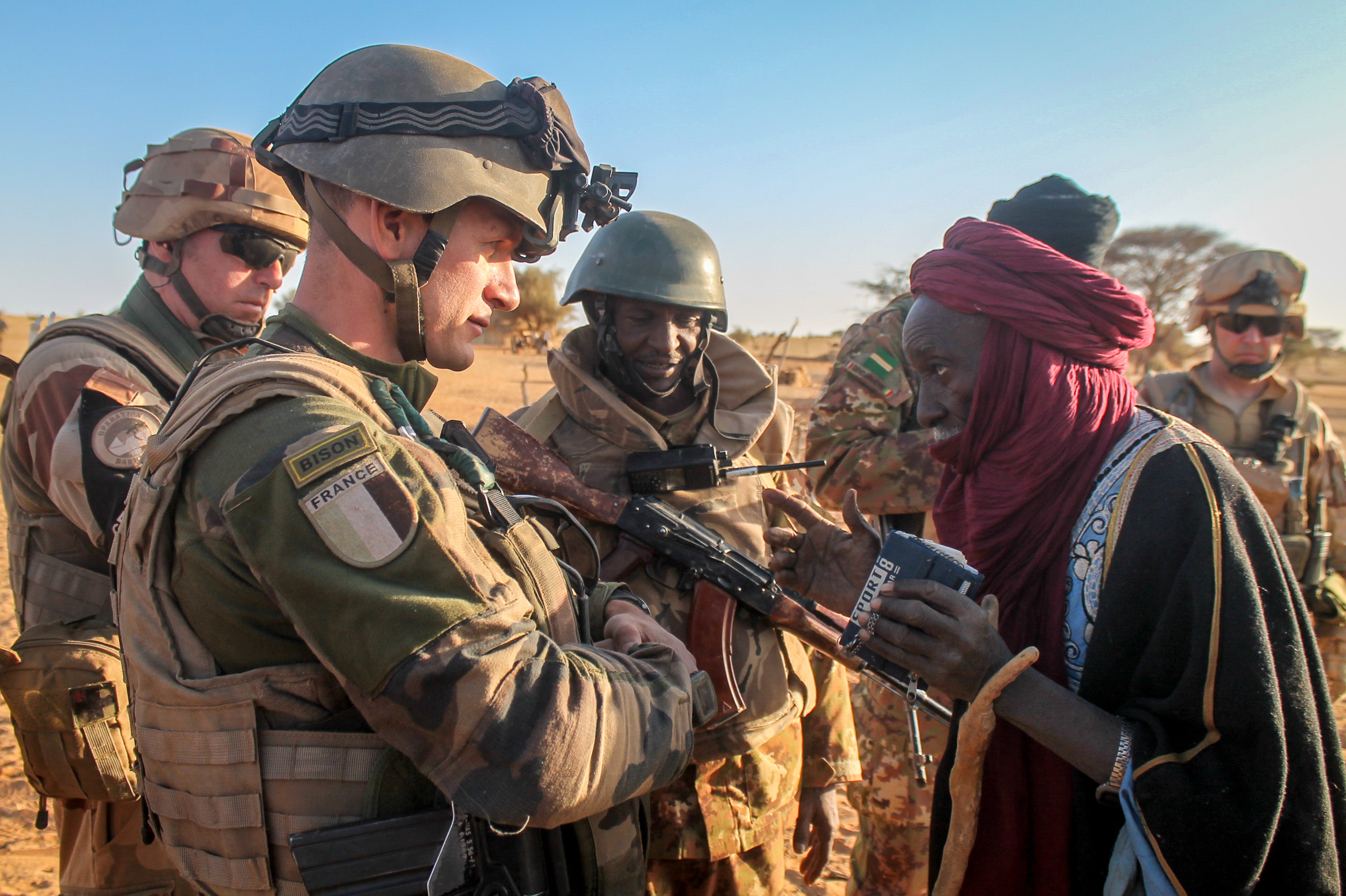
- French soldiers of the 126th Infantry Regiment and Malian soldiers, 17 March 2016
Date	1 August 2014 – 9 November 2022 (8 years, 3 months, 1 week and 1 day)
Location	Sahel: Mauritania, Mali, Burkina Faso, Niger, Chad
Result	Failure of French forces in suppressing jihadists: French forces withdraw from Mali in August 2022, with the operation being based in Niger; France ends the operation in November 2022

Belligerents
France; G5 Sahel: Burkina Faso; Chad; Mali (until August 2022); Mauritania; Niger; Estonia; Sweden; Czech Republic Supported by: United Kingdom; Canada; United States; Denmark	AQIM; Nusrat al-Islam (2017–2022); Al-Mourabitoun (2014–17); Ansar Dine (2014–17); IS-GS (2015–2022)

Commanders and leaders
Emmanuel Macron (President of France, from 2017); Élisabeth Borne (Prime Minister of France, from 2022); Assimi Goïta (President of Mali, from 2021); Abdoulaye Maïga (Prime Minister of Mali, from 2022); Mohamed Bazoum (President of Niger, from 2021); Ouhoumoudou Mahamadou (Prime Minister of Niger, from 2021); Ibrahim Traoré (President of Burkina Faso, from 2022); Apollinaire Joachim Kyélem de Tambèla (Prime Minister of Burkina Faso, from 2022); Mohamed Ould Ghazouani (President of Mauritania, from 2019); Mohamed Ould Bilal (Prime Minister of Mauritania, from 2020); Mahamat Déby (President of Chad, from 2021); Saleh Kebzabo (Prime Minister of Chad, from 2022); Alar Karis (President of Estonia, from 2021); Kaja Kallas (Prime Minister of Estonia, from 2021); Charles III (King of the United Kingdom and Canada, from 2022); Rishi Sunak (Prime Minister of the United Kingdom, from 2022); Robert Ben Lobban Wallace (Secretary of State for Defence, from 2019); Justin Trudeau (Prime Minister of Canada, from 2015); Anita Anand (Minister of National Defence, from 2021); Joe Biden (President of the United States, from 2021); Lloyd Austin (United States Secretary of Defense, from 2021); Margrethe II (Queen of Denmark, from 2014); Mette Frederiksen (Prime Minister of Denmark, from 2019); Miloš Zeman (President of the Czech Republic, from 2014); Petr Fiala (Prime Minister of the Czech Republic, from 2021); Carl XVI Gustaf (King of Sweden, from 2014); Ulf Kristersson (Prime Minister of Sweden, from 2022) Former: François Hollande; Manuel Valls; Bernard Cazeneuve; Édouard Philippe; Jean Castex; Ibrahim Boubacar Keïta; Bah Ndaw; Moussa Mara; Modibo Keita; Abdoulaye Idrissa Maïga; Soumeylou Boubèye Maïga; Boubou Cissé; Moctar Ouane; Choguel Kokalla Maïga; Mahamadou Issoufou; Brigi Rafini; Blaise Compaoré; Honoré Traoré; Yacouba Isaac Zida; Michel Kafando; Gilbert Diendéré; Chérif Sy; Roch Marc Christian Kaboré; Paul-Henri Sandaogo Damiba; Luc-Adolphe Tiao; Yacouba Isaac Zida; Paul Kaba Thieba; Christophe Joseph Marie Dabiré; Lassina Zerbo; Albert Ouédraogo; Mohamed Ould Abdel Aziz; Moulaye Ould Mohamed Laghdaf; Yahya Ould Hademine; Mohamed Salem Ould Béchir; Ismail Ould Bedde Ould Cheikh Sidiya; Idriss Déby †; Kalzeubet Pahimi Deubet; Albert Pahimi Padacké; Kersti Kaljulaid; Toomas Hendrik Ilves; Taavi Rõivas; Jüri Ratas; Elizabeth II; David Cameron; Theresa May; Boris Johnson; Liz Truss; Philip Hammond; Michael Fallon; Gavin Williamson; Penny Mordaunt; Stephen Harper; Robert Nicholson; Jason Kenney; Barack Obama; Donald Trump; Chuck Hagel; Ash Carter; Jim Mattis; Mark Esper; Helle Thorning-Schmidt; Lars Løkke Rasmussen; Bohuslav Sobotka; Andrej Babiš; Fredrik Reinfeldt; Stefan Löfven; Magdalena Andersson	Iyad Ag Ghaly; Djamel Okacha †; Mokhtar Belmokhtar †; Abdelmalek Droukdel †; Yahia Djouadi †; Adnan Abu Walid al-Sahrawi †; Oumeya Ould Albakaye (POW)

Strength
(France) 3,000 troops (since 2022); 5,500 troops (at peak); 95 troops 90 troops 3 heavy lift helicopters 70 troops 2 heavy lift helicopters 150 troops 3 medium-lift helicopters, 1 C-130	6,000 fighters (all groups)

Casualties and losses
53 killed 6 wounded 4 killed, 2 wounded	2,800+ killed Unknown wounded and captured

Operation Barkhane (French: Opération Barkhane) was a counterinsurgency operation that started on 1 August 2014 and formally ended on 9 November 2022. It was led by the French military against Islamist groups in Africa's Sahel region and consisted of a roughly 3,000-strong French force, which was permanently headquartered in N'Djamena, the capital of Chad. The operation was led in co-operation with five countries, all of which are former French colonies that span the Sahel: Burkina Faso, Chad, Mali, Mauritania and Niger. Mali was a part of the operation until August 2022. The countries are collectively referred to as the "G5 Sahel". The operation was named after a crescent-shaped dune type that is common in the Sahara desert.

The French military initially intervened in Mali in early 2013 as part of Operation Serval, which successfully regained the northern half of the country from Islamist groups. Operation Barkhane was intended to follow up on that success and expanded the French military's operations over a vast area of the Sahel region. The operation had the stated aim of helping the countries' governments to maintain control of their territory and preventing the region from becoming a safe haven for Islamist terrorist groups that plan to attack France and Europe.

On 24 May 2021, the 2021 Malian coup d'état was carried out by Vice President Assimi Goïta. French President Emmanuel Macron announced in June 2021 that the operation would soon end and French forces would pull out in a phased manner, due to France's inability to work with the national governments in the Sahel region. He however added that French forces would remain in the region as part of a larger international mission. The operation was later scheduled to end by the first quarter of 2022.

France began withdrawing its troops from Mali on 17 February 2022. Macron announced that the base of Barkhane will shift to Niger. The military junta ruling Mali however asked France to withdraw without delay on 18 March, with Macron responding that they would withdraw over the next four to six months. French forces fully withdrew from Mali on 15 August. The French military stated that the operation was not ending, but being reformulated. However on 9 November, Macron announced the end of Operation Barkhane.

== Background ==
As part of the fallout from the Libyan Civil War, instability in northern Mali caused by a Tuareg rebellion against the central Malian government was exploited by Islamist groups who gained control over the northern half of the country. In response, France launched a military operation in January 2013 to stop the Islamist offensive from toppling the Malian government and to re-capture northern Mali. The operation, codenamed Operation Serval, ended in the complete re-capture of all Islamist held territory by the operation's conclusion on 15 July 2014.

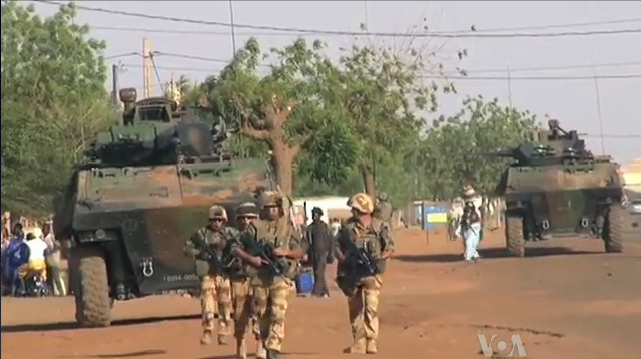
French soldiers and VBCIs patrolling near Gao, Mali as part of Operation Serval, in March 2013.

Following the end of Operation Serval, France recognised the need to provide stability in the wider Sahel region by helping the region's various governments combat terrorism. The former French Defense Minister, Jean-Yves Le Drian, said that France recognised that "there still is a major risk that jihadists develop in the area that runs from the Horn of Africa to Guinea-Bissau." Therefore, Operation Barkhane was launched in order to assure the Sahel nations' security, and in effect France's security. The operation is the successor of Operation Serval, the French military mission in Mali, and Operation Epervier, the mission in Chad.

== Aim ==
The operation aims "to become the French pillar of counterterrorism in the Sahel region". According to French Defence Minister, Jean-Yves Le Drian, the main objective of Operation Barkhane is counter-terrorism: "The aim is to prevent what I call the highway of all forms of traffics to become a place of permanent passage, where jihadist groups between Libya and the Atlantic Ocean can rebuild themselves, which would lead to serious consequences for our security."

The concept of 'partnership' has been emphasised to explain the deployment of the French troops. The main objective of the French military intervention is the direct support of the G5 Sahel forces, through training and the introduction of new technologies and resources. Former French President, François Hollande, has said the Barkhane force will allow for a "rapid and efficient intervention in the event of a crisis" in the region. The operation will target Islamist extremists in Mali, Chad, and Niger, and will have a mandate to operate across borders.

== Forces committed ==
=== French forces ===
The French force was initially a 3,000-strong counter-terrorism force, with 1,000 soldiers deployed indefinitely in Mali. These soldiers were to be focused on counter-terrorism operations in northern Mali, with another 1,200 soldiers stationed in Chad, and the remaining soldiers split between a surveillance base in Niger, a bigger permanent base in Ivory Coast, and some special forces in Burkina Faso. According to original plans, the French forces were supplied with 20 helicopters, 200 armored vehicles, 10 transport aircraft, 6 fighter planes, and 3 drones. French Army Aviation currently have two Aérospatiale SA 330 Pumas in Chad.

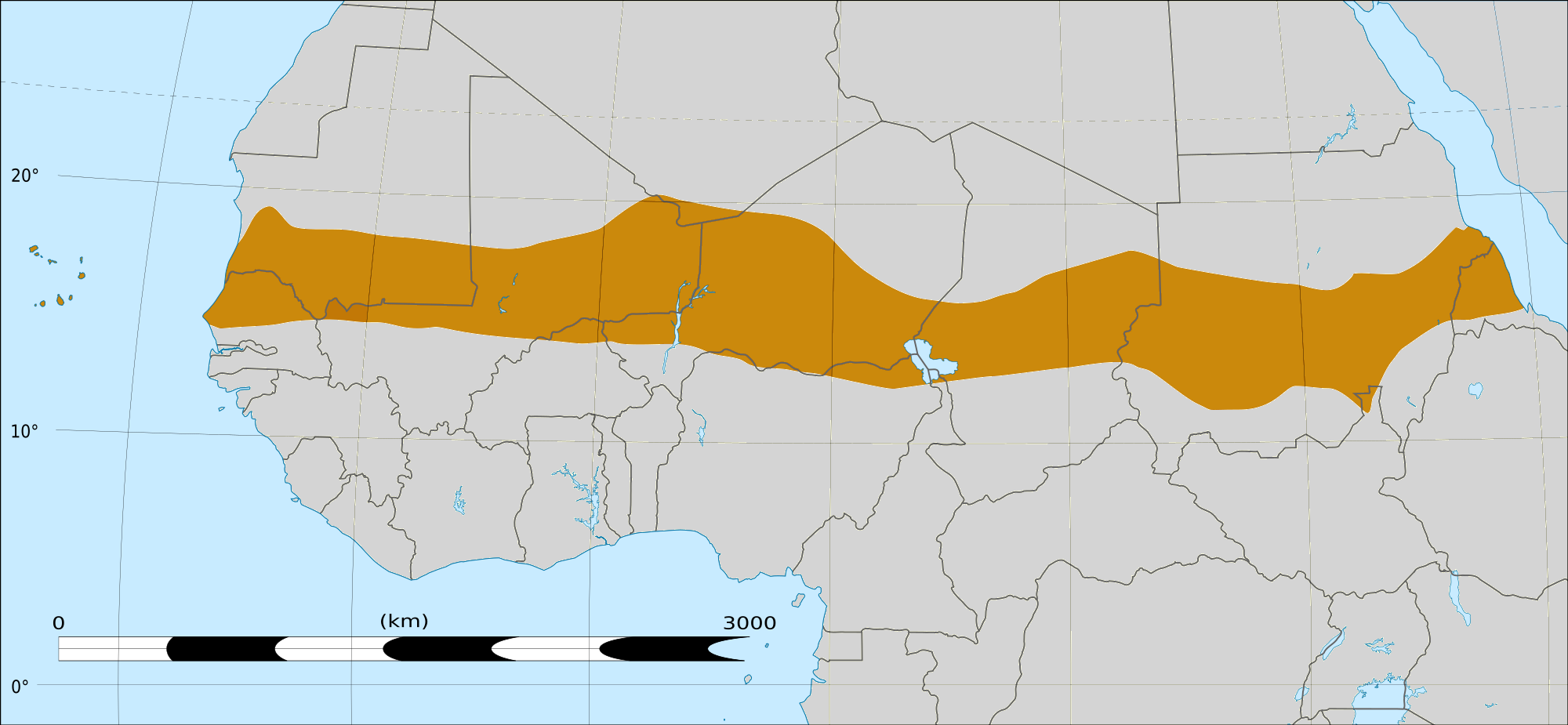
The Sahel region

The division of labor between France and the G5 Sahel has been established by four permanent military bases: (1) headquarters and an air force base in the Chadian capital of N'Djamena (under the leadership of French Général Palasset); (2) a regional base in Gao, north Mali, with at least 1,000 men; (3) a special-forces base in Burkina Faso's capital, Ouagadougou; (4) an intelligence base in Niger's capital, Niamey, with over 300 men.

The Niamey airbase is strategically important because it hosts drones in charge of gathering intelligence across the entire Sahel-Saharan region. From Niamey, France's troops are supported by two German Transall C-160s. In 2020, France stated that it will deploy 600 soldiers in addition to the existing force to fight the Islamist militants in Africa's Sahel.

Aviation support is provided by the French Groupement Tactique Désert-Aérocombat.

=== British support ===
In March 2016, during the UK-France Summit in Paris, the British government announced that it would consider providing support to Operation Barkhane. British Defence Secretary Michael Fallon then announced that the UK would provide monthly strategic airlift support to French forces in Africa. In July 2018, three RAF Chinook helicopters arrived in Mali to provide logistical and troop movement support to French and other military forces operating in the area. This deployment was in addition to the 90 British troops already deployed in the region.

In September 2018, Forces.net reported that, to date, the RAF Chinooks had made 30 sorties, transporting over 700 French troops, supplies and 70 tons of equipment across Mali. In July 2020, the British Ministry of Defence announced that nearly 250 British Army troops would train and deploy to Mali to serve as a long-range reconnaissance force for United Nations forces.

=== Estonia ===
On 22 March 2018, the Ministry of Defence of Estonia announced its intention to commit up to 50 troops and 5 Pasi XA-188 armoured vehicles to Mali as part of Operation Barkhane, to be based in Gao, pending approval by the Riigikogu. The unit, named ESTPLA-26 and headed by Maj. Kristjan Karist, was detached from the C Infantry Company of the Scouts Battalion on 6 August, and arrived in Mali that same week to be stationed at the French military base in Gao. In November 2019, Estonia increased its Operation Barkhane troop deployment to 95 soldiers.

=== Sweden ===
The Swedish contribution to Barkhane via Task Force Takuba arrived in Mali during February 2021. The Swedish troop contribution to Task Force Takuba is a 150-man strong helicopter-borne rapid-response force, centered around an SOG task unit and supported by three UH-60M helicopters and one C-130, ready to be deployed if something unforeseen occurs. The task force will also be used for other operations, as for example to support other countries that exercise and conduct operations with the Malian army.

On 14 January 2022, the Swedish Ministry of Foreign Affairs expressed Sweden's intention to withdraw Swedish forces from the European special forces mission in Sahel and reevaluate Swedish involvement in United Nations task force in Mali.

== Operations ==
=== 2014–2015: Beginning of Barkhane and insurgents regroup ===
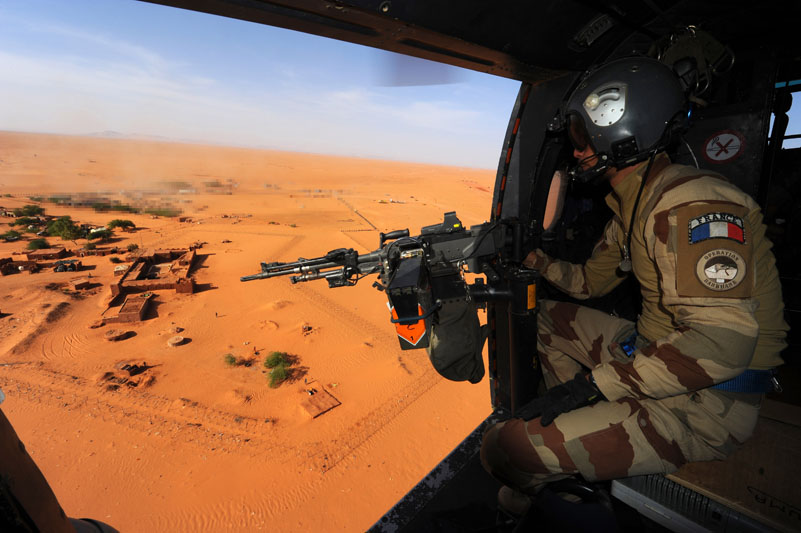
A French military helicopter over the Nigerien town Madama, which serves as a forward operating base for the French, Niger and Chad armies

Operations commenced 1 August 2014. French Forces sustained their first casualty during a battle in early November 2014, which also resulted in 24 jihadists dead. On 24 November, a French special forces soldier was killed in a Caracal helicopter crash in Burkina Faso. French forces experienced their first major success of Barkhane in December 2014 with the killing of Ahmed al-Tilemsi, the leader of the Al-Mourabitoun jihadist group, by French special forces during a raid in the deserts of northern Mali.

From 7 to 14 April 2015, French and Nigerien forces carried out an airborne operation in the far north of Niger to search for Jihadists. As part of the operation, 90 French Army paratroopers of the 2e REP jumped near the Salvador pass. Two soldiers were injured during the jump before they were joined by a joint force of Nigerien and French soldiers from the 1st Parachute Hussar Regiment (1er RHP).

On 26 November 2015, a French Air Parachute Commando died in hospital in France as a result of his injuries after being hit by an anti-tank mine on 13 October near Tessalit during a reconnaissance mission.

=== 2016–2017: Insurgency intensifies ===
French soldiers based in Mali as part of the Army Special Forces Command were rapidly deployed to Burkina Faso on 15 January 2016 after jihadists launched a terrorist attack on Ouagadougou which killed 30 people. In February, French forces killed a number of insurgent fighters in the north of Mali, including a number of high ranking foreign jihadists from AQIM.

On 12 April 2016, three French soldiers were killed when their armored personnel carrier struck a land mine. The convoy of about 60 vehicles was travelling to the northern desert town of Tessalit when it hit the mine. Another French soldier was killed on 4 November 2016 following the explosion of a mine near the town of Abeïbara, which made 2016 the deadliest year up to that point for French forces participating in Barkhane.

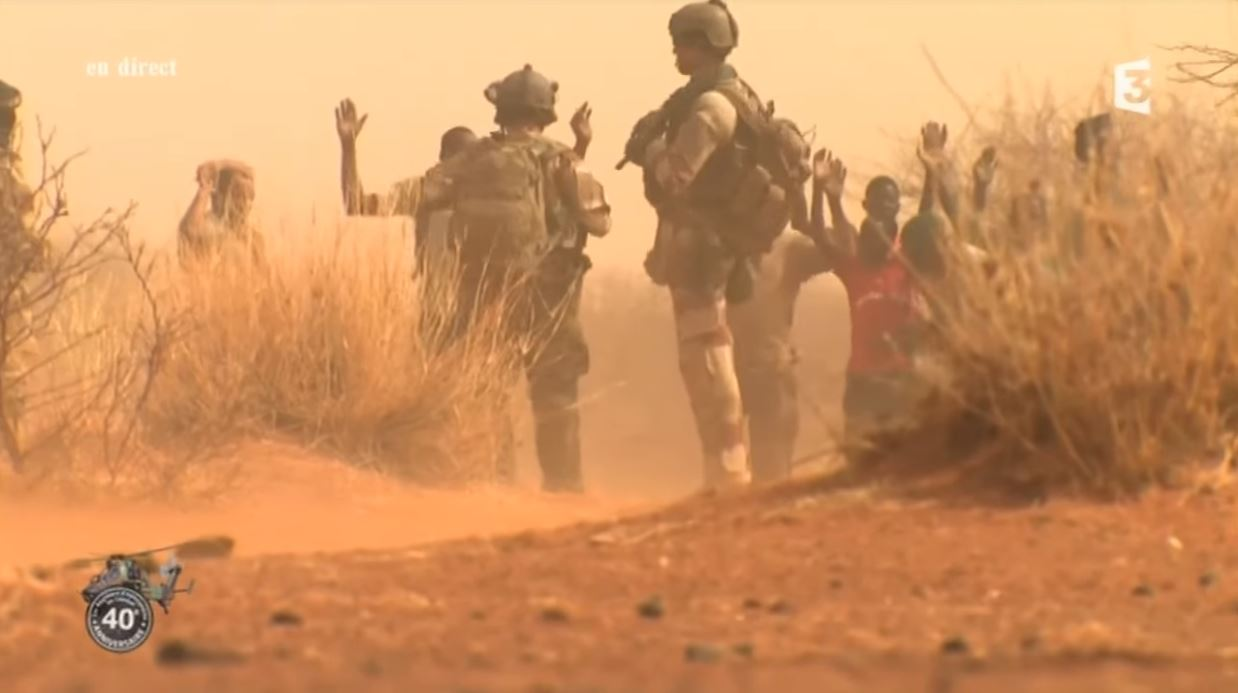
French soldiers from the Mountain Commando Group inspecting Malian travelers northeast of Gao in June 2017.

On 15 March 2017, French forces arrested eight jihadists in the desert north of Timbuktu. On 5 April 2017, master corporal Julien Barbé, was killed in action near Hombori after an explosive device blew up an armoured vehicle. He was posthumously made a knight of the Legion of Honour. Heavy fighting between French forces and Jihadist groups continued into the summer of 2017, with 8 French soldiers being wounded by a mortar attack on their base in Timbuktu on 1 June. On the night of 17 June, France suffered its tenth soldier killed during an airborne operation in the north-east of Mali.

On 4 October 2017, French forces operating as part of Barkhane were the first to respond to the ambush of American soldiers searching for an Islamic State commander on the Niger-Mali border. French air support was requested by the Americans and two hours later Mirage fighter jets arrived from Niamey. Despite the French pilots being unable to engage ground targets due to the proximity of friendly forces, the jets deterrence was enough to end the ambush. A French special forces team were the first ground forces to reach the scene of the ambush, 3–4 hours after the firefight which resulted in the death of 4 American Green Berets.

On 14 October 2017, an Antonov An-26 aircraft operating in support of Operation Barkhane crashed shortly before landing at Félix Houphouët Boigny International Airport, Abidjan, Ivory Coast. Four Moldovan flight crew were killed. Two Moldovan flight crew and four French Army soldiers were injured.

=== 2018–2020: Increased violence across the Sahel and French troop surge ===
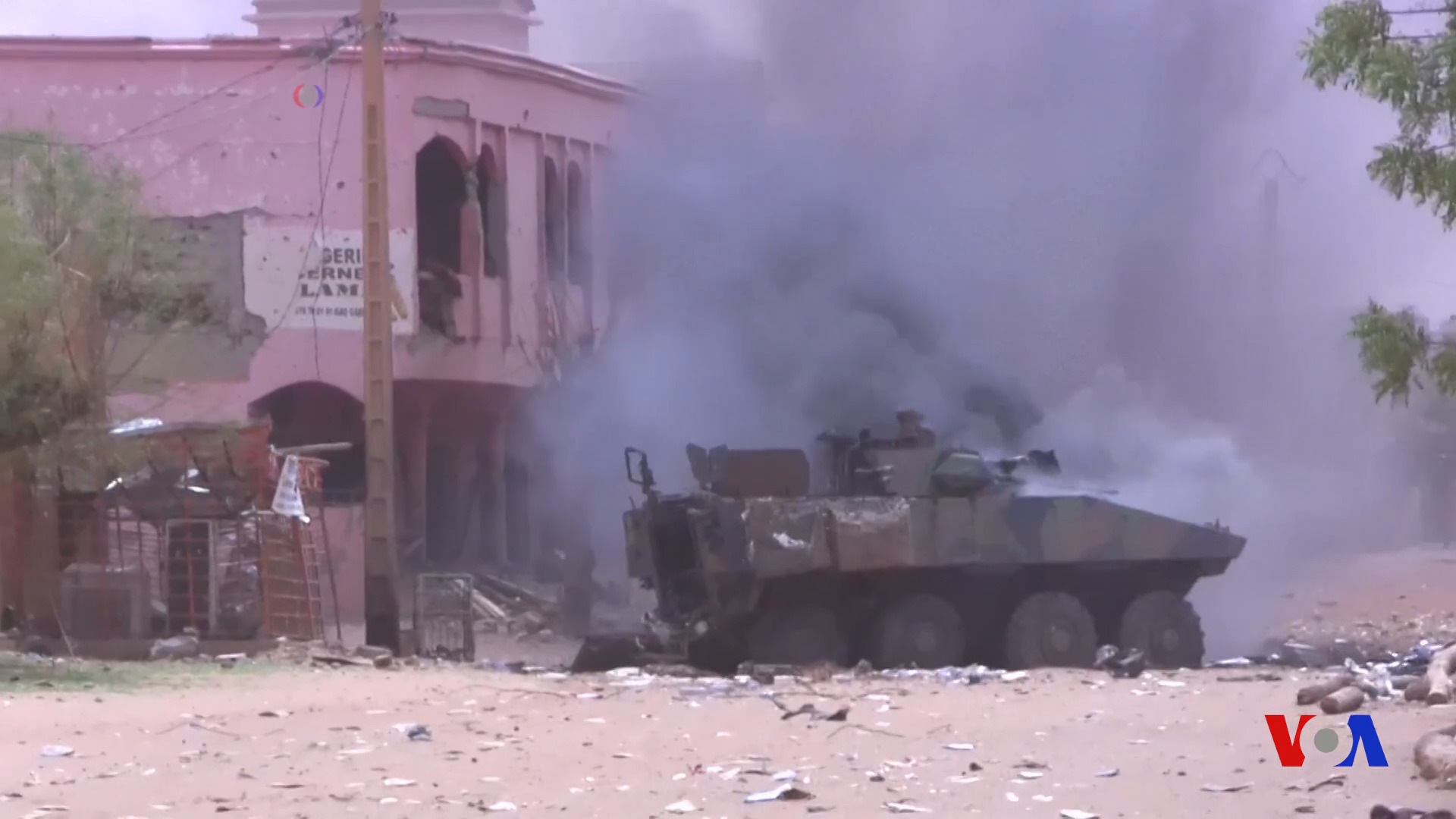
A heavily damaged French VBCI armoured vehicle burns after an attack on a French patrol in the city of Gao.

A French Army convoy was attacked on 11 January 2018, by a suicide car bomb while driving between the towns of Idelimane and Ménaka. Three French soldiers were wounded, one seriously, in the attack which was later claimed by Islamic State in the Greater Sahara. On 14 February, a French airstrike killed at least 10 Jihadists at the border between Algeria and Mali. Two French soldiers from the 1st Spahi Regiment were killed and the Colonel-in-chief was wounded on 21 February when the armoured vehicle they were travelling in struck a mine between the towns of Gao and Ménaka.

On 14 April 2018, JNIM militants launched an attack on a UN base in Timbuktu, wounding several French soldiers before being repelled by French, Malian and American troops. Four French soldiers were seriously wounded by a suicide car bomb attack against a joint French-Malian patrol in Gao on 1 July 2018. The attack, which heavily damaged a number of French VBCIs, also killed 4 civilians and seriously wounded 27 others.

On 22 February 2019, French forces backed by an armed reaper drone and a helicopter attacked a JNIM convoy killing 11 militants including senior leader Yahia Abou el Hamman in the Tombouctou Region of Mali. A militant improvised explosive device struck a French armoured vehicle carrying out an anti-terrorist operation in the Mopti Region on 2 April, killing one French soldier and seriously wounding another. Two French commandos of the Commandos Marine were killed on 9 May in the North of Burkina Faso during a rescue mission which successfully rescued four hostages, included two Frenchmen, and an American and South Korean woman, who had been kidnapped by Islamists.

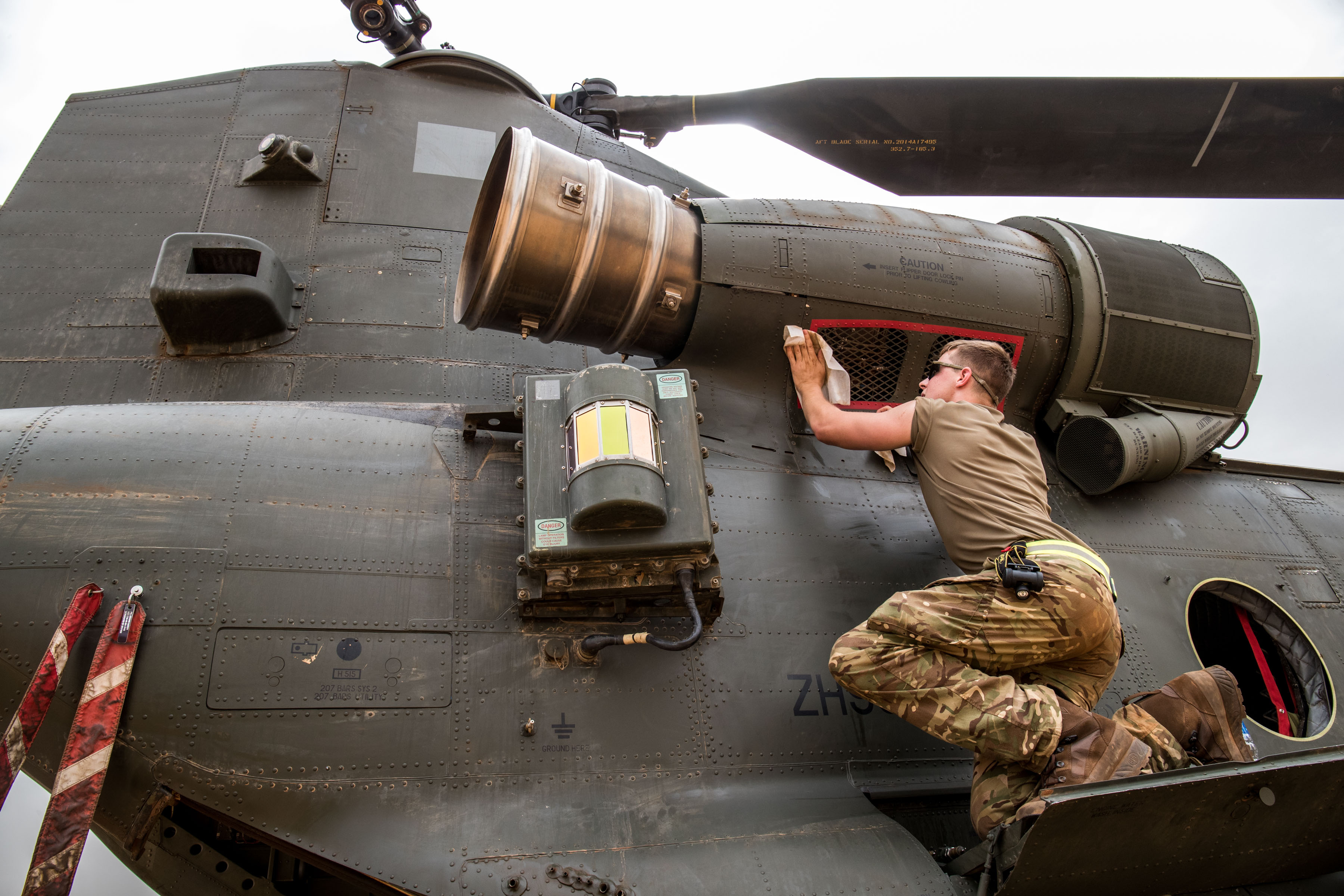
A British aircraft technician servicing a Royal Air Force Chinook helicopter operating out of Gao, Mali in support of Operation Serval.

In mid-June 2019, a French Army Light Aviation Gazelle helicopter crashed in the border region between Mali and Niger after being fired upon by insurgent small arms fire. The two pilots and a special forces sniper were subsequently rescued by another helicopter after destroying the damaged helicopter. The French military base in Gao was assaulted by suicide bombers on 22 July in an attack that wounded 6 Estonian soldiers and a similar number of French personnel. A French soldier was killed on 2 November 2019 when his vehicle was struck by an improvised explosive device during a patrol near Ménaka in eastern Mali. French commandos launched a heli-borne raid later that month on an insurgent camp in Mali's eastern regions, which resulted in five insurgents killed and one French soldier being seriously injured.

On 25 November 2019, 13 French soldiers were killed in northern Mali when two French helicopters, a 'Tigre' and a 'Cougar', collided in mid-air while flying to reinforce soldiers engaged in combat with insurgents. The loss of 13 soldiers was the heaviest loss of life for the French military since the 1983 Beirut barracks bombings.

On 21 December 2019, the French military killed 40 militants in an operation in the Mopti Region of Mali. The area where the operation took place was controlled by Macina Liberation Front and it involved France's first ever use of a drone strike which accounted for 7 of the 40 killed insurgents.

The French Defense Minister Florence Parly announced in February 2020 that France would send an additional 600 troops to the Sahel region, bolstering Operation Barkhanes' force to 5,100 troops. The first contingent of these reinforcements was 200 French Army paratroopers from the 2e REP who were transported to Niger and formed a battle group called Desert Tactical Grouping (GTD) "Altor". This battle group operated autonomously and without a base on the ground for over a month, receiving supplies only by airdrop. GTD Altor killed over a dozen insurgents and disrupted their logistics throughout their initial month-long operation.

Two soldiers from the 1st Foreign Cavalry Regiment (1er REC) were seriously wounded when their vehicle struck an IED during operations against insurgents on 23 April 2020; one of the soldiers subsequently died from his wounds. On 4 May 2020, a second soldier from the 1er REC was killed in action near Gao during a firefight with an insurgent force.

On 3 June, French forces achieved one of their most significant successes of Operation Barkhane with the killing of Abdelmalek Droukdel, the leader of Al-Qaeda in the Islamic Maghreb (AQIM). French and American intelligence sources had identified Droukdel's presence in a group crossing the Algerian-Malian border approximately 80 kilometres east of the town of Tessalit. French special forces subsequently conducted an air assault to intercept the group during which they shot and killed Droukdel and a number of other militants.

A French soldier from the 1st Parachute Hussar Regiment (1er RHP) was killed during combat operations in Mali on 23 July 2020 when an improvised explosive device was triggered next to his armoured vehicle. Two further paratroopers from the 1er RHP were killed on 5 September 2020 by an improvised explosive device which struck their vehicle during an operation in the north of Mali. On 31 October 2020, French special Forces launched an operation near the town of Boulikessi near the border of Mali and Burkina Faso, 50 jihadists were killed and four were captured. On 10 November 2020, Ba Ag Moussa, Emir of Jama'at Nasr al-Islam wal Muslimin, along with 4 other militants were killed in an attack carried out by French Special forces.

On 12 November 2020, French Mountains commandos operating under Barkhane killed 30 jihadists in the city of Niaki in Central Mali. After locating a suspicious encampment near Niaki, 180 kilometers east of Mopti, four Mirage 2000 fighter jets took off from the Niamey airbase in Niger, as reported by the French military headquarters. Additionally, four Tigre combat helicopters and three Caïman troop transport helicopters were dispatched, carrying mountain commandos on board. Following initial airstrikes by the Mirage jets on the encampment, the commandos, supported by the fighter jets and helicopters, engaged in a ground combat lasting approximately an hour, stated Colonel Barbry. Following the operation, a significant amount of enemy assets were seized and the jihadist group suffered notable casualties. The ground forces reported confiscating approximately twenty motorcycles and a substantial quantity of weaponry from the encampment.

On 30 November 2020, insurgents launched a coordinated attack on three separate French military bases in Kidal, Ménaka and Gao in northern Mali using indirect rocket fire but French forces reported no casualties as a result of the attacks. A French military convoy consisting of the 1er Régiment de Chasseurs (1er RCh) was struck by two IED blasts in quick succession on 28 December 2020 during an operation in the Hombori region in central Mali, resulting in the death of three soldiers.

=== 2021–2022: French withdrawal ===
On 2 January 2021, two French soldiers from the 2nd Hussar Regiment (2e RH) were killed while taking part in an intelligence gathering mission in northeastern Mali. Six French soldiers were wounded on 10 January when a suicide bomber attacked their convoy during a patrol in the central region near Gourma. French and Malian forces conducted a joint offensive operation named Operation Éclipse from 2 to 20 January in the forests surrounding the town of Boni. Over 100 jihadists were killed and 20 captured by French forces during the course of this operation.

French forces carried out a controversial airstrike during the course of operation Éclipse which locals claimed targeted a wedding ceremony in the village of Bounti, in the central Mopti region, on 3 January. The French military denied these accusations and claimed that the strike had successfully targeted a group of jihadist fighters. However, the United Nations mission in Mali, known as MINUSMA, investigated the airstrike and concluded that it had killed 19 unarmed civilians, most of whom were elderly. France maintained its version of events, calling the UN investigation "biased".

France announced it had suspended joint military operations with Mali on 3 June, in response to the coup d'état carried out by the Malian military, resulting in the deposition of the interim president Bah Ndaw and Prime Minister Moctar Ouane in May.

The president of France Emmanuel Macron announced on 10 June that the operation would soon be coming to an end and instead be replaced by a mission involving forces from more countries. He also added that the French forces will withdraw in a phased manner, but some will remain as part of another international mission, for which France would convince other countries to join. As to the reason for the withdrawal, he stated that France could not continue to work with the national governments in the Sahel region, as they were negotiating with terrorists.

On 2 July, France announced that it would resume its suspended joint military operations with Mali, following discussions with the interim government of the country.

On 9 July, Macron stated that France will withdraw between 2,500 and 3,000 troops from the Sahel, while retaining other troops to thwart militant operations and supporting regional forces. On 13 July, he announced that Barkhane would end in the first quarter of 2022.

On 15 September, Macron announced that Barkhane forces had killed Adnan Abu Walid al-Sahrawi, the leader of Islamic State in the Greater Sahara. The assassination was conducted on 17 August using a drone in the Dangalous Forest of Mali near the border with Niger, according to the Chief of the Defence Staff Thierry Burkhard, after gathering information on locations where al-Sahrawi was likely to hide from captured IS-GS members. Burkhard added that al-Sahrawi was travelling on a motorcycle with another person when he was killed. A unit comprising 20 soldiers of the French Army's special forces was then sent to confirm the identities of those killed and found that the strike had killed ten IS-GS members.

On 24 September, a French soldier was killed in an armed clash with insurgents in Mali, close to the border with Burkina Faso.

As of 2021, Operation Barkhane cost about €1 billion per year.

On 11 February, the French Army announced that it killed 40 militants in airstrikes on a motorcycle column in the W National Park area in cooperation with the Burkinabe forces on the previous day. The militants had carried out two armed attacks in Benin on 8 and 9 February, killing nine people.

France along with its European allies announced the beginning of the withdrawal of troops from Mali on 17 February, blaming the military junta of Mali for obstructions in carrying out their military operations. France stated that the withdrawal was meant for its soldiers part of both Operation Barkhane and Takuba Task Force. Macron stated that the base of the operation would shift from Mali to Niger. France began redeploying its forces to other countries of the Sahel like Chad.

The French military stated on 7 March 2022 that its forces had killed al-Qaeda commander Yahia Djouadi, alias "Abu Ammar al-Jazairi", overnight between 25 and 26 February. Djouadi was a former emir of the group in Libya before fleeing to Mali in 2019. He helped organize the group, in addition to managing its supplies, logistics and finances in the Tombouctou Region.

On 18 March, the military government of Mali asked France to withdraw its troops "without delay". President Macron however responded that about 5,000 French troops will leave Mali in an "orderly fashion" over the next four to six months, in order to provide protection for the United Nations Multidimensional Integrated Stabilization Mission in Mali (MINUSMA) and forces of other nations stationed in Mali.

France announced on 15 June that it had captured Oumeya Ould Albakaye, a senior ISGS leader in Mali overnight between 11 and 12 June. On the following day, it stated that nearly 40 militants were killed in drone strikes on a column of motorcycles near Niger's border with Burkina Faso on 14 June.

French forces completed their withdrawal from Mali on 15 August. The French military stated that 3,000 troops will remain in the Sahel region as part of Operation Barkhane and added that it was not ending, but being reformulated. However on November 9, Macron announced the end of Operation Barkhane and stated that some French troops will remain in the region under new arrangements.

== Casualties ==
=== French forces ===
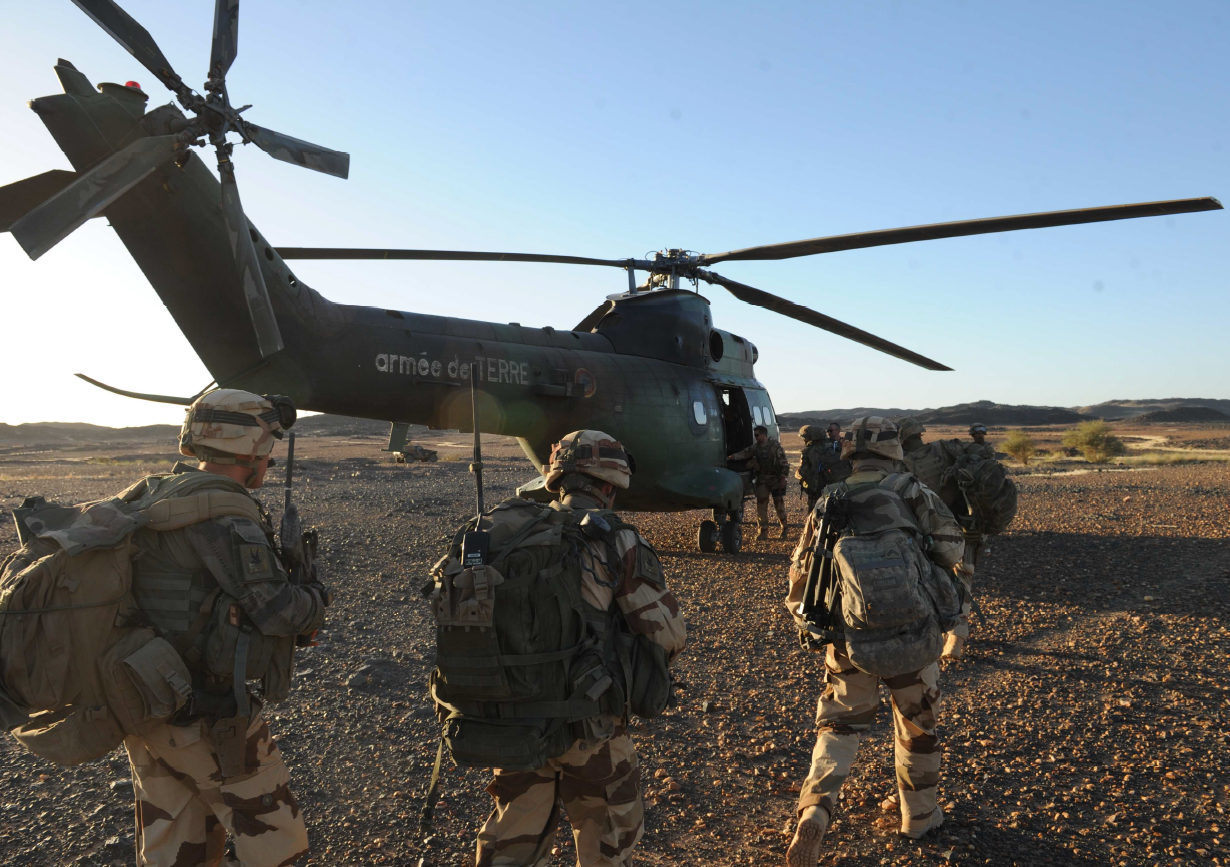
French troops of the 35th Parachute Artillery Regiment (35^{e} RAP) board a helicopter during a mission.

Prior to the beginning of Operation Barkhane, 10 French troops had been killed in Mali as part of Operation Serval. Since the launch of Operation Barkhane in August 2014, the French Ministère des Armées listed 38 servicemen were reported killed in Mali, 2 in Burkina Faso and one in Chad. The vast distances of Operation Barkhane force's area of operations across the Sahel pose a significant challenge in dealing with French casualties, with wounded troops being possibly up to 1,100 km (680 mi) from advanced medical aid.

To overcome these challenges, the French military created helicopter-mobile medical teams which can rapidly carry out MEDEVAC missions and transport casualties to more advanced medical care. Between 2013 and 2016, it was reported that French forces sustained 1,272 casualties which required MEDEVAC; of these casualties, 18.2% were wounded in action, 27.4% suffered trauma injuries and 46.6% were suffering from disease or sickness.

=== Insurgent forces ===
After the first year of operations, the French Army claimed that approximately 125 insurgents had been neutralized by French forces. In late 2015, French army representatives indicated that over 150 ammunition and explosive depositories had been discovered and 25 vehicles and 80 electronic devices (GPS, computers, satellite phones and radio stations) had been destroyed. This represented 20 tons of ammunition, including 2,000 shells, 680 grenades, guided missiles, 25 IEDs and mines, 210 detonators, 30 mortars, machine guns and rocket launchers. The army also seized 3,500 kg (7,700 lb) of various drugs. French forces continued to inflict significant casualties in 2016, with nearly 150 insurgents killed or captured in that year. By July 2017, the French Forces estimated that over 400 insurgents had been killed since the start of Operation Barkhane.

In February 2018, the French Defense Minister, Florence Parly, indicated that 450 jihadists have been neutralized, amongst which 120 have been killed and 150 held as prisoners by Malian authorities. In July 2018, General Bruno Guibert, head of the Barkhane force, confirmed that 120 terrorists had been killed since the beginning of the year. In February 2019, Parly announced that over 600 jihadists had been "neutralized" since the beginning of the operation in 2014.

== Opinions and opposition ==
=== Divided opinions ===
From 2013 and the beginning of the Operation Serval onward, replaced by Operation Barkhane in 2014, opinions in Mali were divided as to the legitimacy of the French intervention. According to Mission head for Peace in Mali for the Stockholm International Peace Research Institute Aurélien Tobie, "Between 2013 and 2015, we quickly realised, after the peace agreements in Ouagadougou and Algiers for Mali that the Malian opinion towards the French presence was changing. People were supporting the Serval Operation, but did not understand why the French presence was being prolonged with the Barkhane Operation".

In 2017, the study "Mali-Meter", conducted by the Friedrich Ebert Foundation in Mali, polled the level of satisfaction with Operation Barkhane amongst the Malian population. Less than half of the respondents were satisfied with the French intervention. The study also showed geographical disparities in approbation of Operation Barkhane.

According to Aurélien Tobie, the differences of opinion between the North and the South of the country can be explained by the difference in proximity of the population with the operations: "People in contact with the forces of Barkhane in the North of the country approve of it much more because they see changes in their daily lives. Conversely, people interviewed in Southern Mali, who are generally higher educated but also further away from the conflict zone, are much more critical of the French presence".

Demonstrations against the French presence took place since 2013 in Mali, on a regular basis. Patriotic groups have been emerging. These groups strive for an end of the French presence and some call for a Russian intervention.

In June 2019, a former Malian minister anonymously declared to French newspaper Libération that anti-French sentiment was at its peak in Mali: "Conspiracy theories are flourishing everywhere. Soon, France will be accused of being responsible for the floods. The inertia of our own leaders is the primary cause of the problem".

Malian President Ibrahim Boubacar Keita also strongly criticised anti-French demonstrations. He stated in December 2019 that: "the foreign forces in our country are our allies in this tragic war imposed on us. We will not win this war by misunderstanding who our true enemy is and by falling into the trap of the terrorist groups".

French President Emmanuel Macron has denounced a "disinformation campaign" led by a rival power, implying it was Russia, although he did not explicitly name it.

On August 7, 2023, 94 French senators sent an open letter to President Emmanuel Macron in which they regretted "the failure of Operation Barkhane" and "the erasure of France" in Africa. The signatories, led by LR Roger Karoutchi, Bruno Retailleau and Christian Cambon, ask the president to review his strategy.

=== Françafrique ===
Much of the criticism of the French intervention revolves around the concept of Françafrique, a pejorative term used to describe the alleged neocolonial practices of France in its former African colonies.

== See also ==
- List of battles involving France in modern history
