= Bouaré Fily Sissoko =

Malian politician (born 1955)

Minister of Finance
- In office 8 September 2013 – 10 January 2015
- President: Ibrahim Boubacar Keïta
- Prime Minister: Oumar Tatam Ly; Moussa Mara
- Preceded by: Abdel Karim Konaté
- Succeeded by: Mamadou Igor Diarra

Minister of Communication
- In office 23 June 2001 – 14 June 2002
- President: Alpha Oumar Konaré; Amadou Toumani Touré
- Prime Minister: Mandé Sidibé; Modibo Keita

Minister of State Domains and Land Affairs
- In office 21 February 2000 – 14 June 2002
- President: Alpha Oumar Konaré; Amadou Toumani Touré
- Prime Minister: Mandé Sidibé; Modibo Keita

Personal details
- Born: 22 August 1955 (age 71) Dakar, French West Africa
- Children: 2
- Education: National School of Administration; Université Nice-Sophia-Antipolis; Max Planck Institute for Human Development

Bouaré Fily Sissoko (born 22 August 1955) is a Malian politician. She was Minister of State Domains and Land Affairs from 2000 to 2002, Minister of Communication from 2001 to 2002 and Minister of Finance from 2013 to 2015. She was sentenced to ten years in prison in 2025.

== Biography ==
Sissoko was born on 22 August 1955 in Dakar, French West Africa. She speaks French, English, Bambara, Khassonké and Ouolof.

Sissoko was educated in Ségou. She then studied a bachelor's degree in economics at the National School of Administration in Mali and a master's degree in development law at the Université Nice-Sophia-Antipolis in Nice, France. She also studied a certificate in customs techniques at the Max Planck Institute for Human Development in Berlin, Germany.

Before entering the Malian government, Sissoko worked in the Malian administration, including as deputy head of the Unit in charge of African Regional Integration, project manager at the Ministry of Economy, Finance and Planning, deputy director general of customs, and state controller.

Sissoko was minister of state domains and land affairs from 21 February 2000, then was additionally appointed as minister of communication from 23 June 2001, serving in these roles until 14 June 2002.

Sisoko worked at the World Bank Resident Mission in Mali from 2004 to 2013.

Sisoko returned to government in 2013, serving as minister of finance from 8 September 2013 to 10 January 2015. She headed a mission to the International Monetary Fund (IMF) in Washington D.C., United States, in 2014.

Sissoko was Mali's representative to the West African Economic and Monetary Union (UEMOA) from May 2017.

In August 2021, was Sissoko placed under arrest as part of a corruption investigation by the Malian justice system into two cases: the purchase of the presidential Boeing plane and overcharged military equipment contracts. She was held in pre-trial detention for over three years at Bollé Women's Detention Center. She was sentenced to ten years in prison, accompanied by a fine of 500,000 CFA francs.

In March 2025, Sissoko's lawyer filed a request for provisional release to the Supreme Court and the Court of Appeal on health grounds, due to deteriorating health caused by sickle cell disease, heart problems, hypertension and osteoarthritis. The request was rejected. In April 2025, she was hospitalized in Bamako after a suffering from a heart attack in prison.
