= Maïga =

Maïga is a name or title that is extensively found among the Songhai nobility, denoting descent from Askia Muhammad I and Sonni Ali Ber. The name Maiga is a commonly used surname among the Songhai people in Mali, Niger, and other West African countries with a significant Songhai population. Additionally, the name is occasionally used as a given name.

In Niger, the name Maïga is sometimes used interchangeably to refer to the general Songhaiborai identity, rather than just as a title denoting nobility. In this context, it is used as an ethnic designation to refer to individuals who are of Songhai descent.

== Etymology ==
The etymology of the name is said to mean "Mai" which means "ruler" and "Ga" which means "land" in the Songhai language. Some also suggest that Maiga means "help" or "give". In the present context, Maïga means "the one who is required to help" because they were the upper class who were required to lend a helping hand to the lower castes in ancient times.

== Notable People ==
- Abdoulaye Idrissa Maïga (born 1958), prime minister of Mali in 2017
- Mohamadou Djibrilla Maïga, Nigerien politician
- Djingarey Maïga, Nigerien film director and actor
- Abdoulaye Maïga, ambassador of Mali to the United States in 1960 and Czechoslovakia, Bulgaria and Rumania in 1964
- Abdoulaye Maïga (officer) (born 1981), appointed interim prime minister of Mali in August 2022
- Boureima Maïga, Burkinabè footballer
- Abdoulaye Maïga (footballer) (born 1988), Malian professional footballer
- Aïssa Maïga (born 1975), Senegalese/French actress
- Mahamane Kalil Maiga (born 1948), Minister of Defense and Armed Forces of Mali 2002 - 2004
- Aminata Maïga Ka (1940–2005), Senegalese writer
- Choguel Kokalla Maïga (born 1958), prime minister of Mali 2021–2022
- Aminatou Maïga Touré, Nigerien diplomat, Niger's Ambassador to the United States from 2006 to 2010
- Habib Maïga (born 1996), Ivorian footballer
- Mamadou Maiga (born 1995), Russian footballer born in Mali
- Modibo Maïga (born 1987), Malian footballer
- Ousmane Issoufi Maïga (born 1946), prime minister of Mali 2004–2007
- Soumeylou Boubèye Maïga (1954–2022), prime minister of Mali 2017–2019
- Zhosselina Maiga (born 1996), Russian basketball player
- Abou Maïga, Beninese footballer
- Boncana Maïga (1949–2026), Malian composer and musician

== See Also ==
- Sohance
- Songhai Empire
- Songhai people
- Songhai proper
- Zarma people
- Arma people
