= Mohamed Ag Erlaf =

Malian politician

Ministry of Industry and Commerce
- In office 5 May 2019 – 27 July 2020
- President: Ibrahim Boubacar Keïta
- Prime Minister: Boubou Cissé
- Preceded by: Mohamed Aly Ag Ibrahim (Development of Industry); Abdel Karim Konaté (Commerce)
- Succeeded by: Arouna Niang (indirectly)

Minister of Territorial Administration and Decentralisation
- In office 30 December 2017 – 5 May 2019
- President: Ibrahim Boubacar Keïta
- Prime Minister: Soumeylou Boubèye Maïga
- Preceded by: Tiéman Hubert Coulibaly
- Succeeded by: Boubacar Alpha Bah

Minister of Territorial Administration and Decentralisation
- In office 3 September 2016 – 11 April 2017
- President: Ibrahim Boubacar Keïta
- Prime Minister: Modibo Keïta
- Preceded by: Abdoulaye Idrissa Maïga
- Succeeded by: Tiéman Hubert Coulibaly

Minister of Environment, Decentralisation, and State Reform
- In office 7 July 2016 – 3 September 2016
- President: Ibrahim Boubacar Keïta
- Prime Minister: Modibo Keïta
- Succeeded by: Mohamed Ag Erlaf (Decentralisation)

Minister of Environment, Sanitation, and Sustainable Development
- In office 8 January 2015 – 7 July 2016
- President: Ibrahim Boubacar Keïta
- Prime Minister: Modibo Keïta
- Preceded by: Abdoulaye Idrissa Maïga
- Succeeded by: Keita Aïda M'Bo

Personal details
- Born: Mohamed Ag Erlaf; 12 July 1956 (age 69) Tessalit, Mali

Mohamed Ag Erlaf (born 12 July 1956) is a Malian politician.

On 6 August 2018, 18 of the 24 candidates in Mali's presidential election demanded Erlaf's resignation as Minister of Territorial Administration and Decentralisation, blaming him for electoral fraud, which they described as "electoral robbery".
