= Abdoulaye Maïga =

Abdoulaye Maïga is a Malian personal name. It may refer to:

- Abdoulaye Maïga, ambassador of Mali to the United States in 1960
- Abdoulaye Maïga (officer) (born 1981), appointed interim prime minister of Mali in August 2022
- Abdoulaye Idrissa Maïga (born 1958), prime minister of Mali from 8 April 2017 to 29 December 2017
- Abdoulaye Maïga (footballer) (born 1988), Malian football centre back
