= List of ambassadors of Mali to China =

Coordinates: 39.939153°N 116.457799°E

Ambassador of Mali to China
- Incumbent; N'Tji Laico Traore since November 14, 2006
- Inaugural holder: Koniba Pleah
- Formation: January 1961

The Malian ambassador in Beijing is the official representative of the Government in Bamako to the Government of the People's Republic of China.

== List of representatives ==
Diplomatic agrément/Diplomatic accreditation	Ambassador	Observations	List of heads of state of Mali	Premier of the People's Republic of China	Term end
October 25, 1960		The governments in Beijing and Bamako established diplomatic relations.	Modibo Keïta	Zhou Enlai	
January 1961	Koniba Pleah		Modibo Keïta	Zhou Enlai	1962
1962	Birama Traore		Modibo Keïta	Zhou Enlai	1966
1966	Guisse Tidiani		Modibo Keïta	Zhou Enlai	1968
1968	Assane Guindo		Modibo Keïta	Zhou Enlai	1974
1975	Sinaly Thera		Moussa Traoré	Zhou Enlai	1979
1979	Sekou Almany Koreisi		Moussa Traoré	Hua Guofeng	1983
July 27, 1983	Boubakar Toure		Moussa Traoré	Zhao Ziyang	1987
May 6, 1988	Nakounte Diakite		Mamadou Dembelé	Li Peng	1990
1993	Kafougouna Kone		Abdoulaye Sékou Sow	Li Peng	
2002	Modibo Tiemoko Traore		Ahmed Mohamed ag Hamani	Zhu Rongji	2007
November 14, 2006	N'Tji Laico Traore		Ousmane Issoufi Maïga	Wen Jiabao	
