= Sanoussi Touré =

Malian politician (born c.1950)

Sanoussi Touré (born 31st of December 1949) is a Malian political figure and finance inspector who was appointed to the government of Mali as Minister of the Economy and Finance in April 2009.

Touré studied in Mali and France, earning degrees in economics and finance. He was a professor at Mali's National School of Administration (École nationale d'administration) and the University of Mali from 1980 to 2000, and he also held high positions in the state administration; he was Director-General of Financial Control from 1978 to 1987, Director-General of the Budget from 1987 to 1991, and Technical Adviser to the Ministry of the Economy and Finance from 1991 to 1994. Later, he worked as a consultant on finance and the economy for international organizations, including the World Bank, from 1995 to 2000, and he worked in a regional role as Public Finance Commissioner of the West African Economic and Monetary Union (UEMOA) from 2001 to 2005. He became Technical Adviser to the UEMOA Commission, in charge of public finance and fiscal policy, in 2005.

Back in Mali, Touré was appointed Director of the Cabinet of Prime Minister Modibo Sidibé, with the rank of Minister, in January 2008; he officially succeeded Django Sissoko as Director of the Cabinet of the Prime Minister on 4 February 2008. He was then moved into the Malian government as Minister of the Economy and Finance on 9 April 2009.
