= Tiéna Coulibaly =

Malian politician (born 1952)

Minister of Defence and Veteran Affairs
- In office 11 April 2017 – 18 August 2020
- President: Ibrahim Boubacar Keïta
- Preceded by: Abdoulaye Idrissa Maïga
- Succeeded by: Colonel Sadio Camara

Malian Ambassador to the United States
- In office November 2014 – April 2017
- Prime Minister: Modibo Keita
- Preceded by: Al-Maamoun Baba Lamine Keita

Personal details
- Born: 1952 (age 73–74) Bore, Mali

Tiéna Coulibaly (born 1952) is a Malian politician who has served as Minister of Defense in the government of Mali from 2017 to 2020. Previously he was Minister of Finance from 1988 to 1991, and again from 2012 to 2013. Coulibaly was ousted during the 2020 Malian coup d'état and replaced by Colonel Sadio Camara.

== Early life and education ==
Coulibaly was born in Boré, Mali. He attended primary education from 1959 to 1964 in his native village before pursuing secondary education in Prosper Kamara High School in Bamako and graduated in 1971. He studied at Université Laval in Québec, where he earned a bachelor's degree in agricultural economics in 1977. Later, he went to graduate school at Purdue University, receiving an M.S. in agricultural economics in 1978.

== Career ==
Between 1981 and 1987, he was technical adviser to the Ministry of Livestock. From 1987 to 1988, he served as Deputy Director-General of the Libyan-Malian Livestock Development Corporation. In 1988, he was appointed Minister of Finance and Trade under President Moussa Traoré. Coulibaly was arrested following the ouster of Moussa Traoré in the March Revolution of 1991, but acquitted after the "Crimes of blood" trial in 1993.

He was appointed technical advisor to the Cotton Sector Restructuring Mission (FRSC). In November 2008, he became chairman and chief executive officer of the Malian Textile Development Company (CMDT), a position he held until he was appointed to the government. He was appointed Minister of the Economy, Finances and Budget on 24 April 2012, serving in that post until 22 June 2013, when he was instead appointed Minister of Trade and Industry.

On 13 November 2014 he was appointed Ambassador to the United States, where he was accredited on 18 November 2014.

On 11 April 2017, President Keita named Coulibaly as Minister of Defence and Veteran Affairs in a cabinet reshuffle.

== Personal life ==
He is married and has four children.
