= Choguel Kokalla Maïga =

Prime Minister of Mali from 2021 to 2024

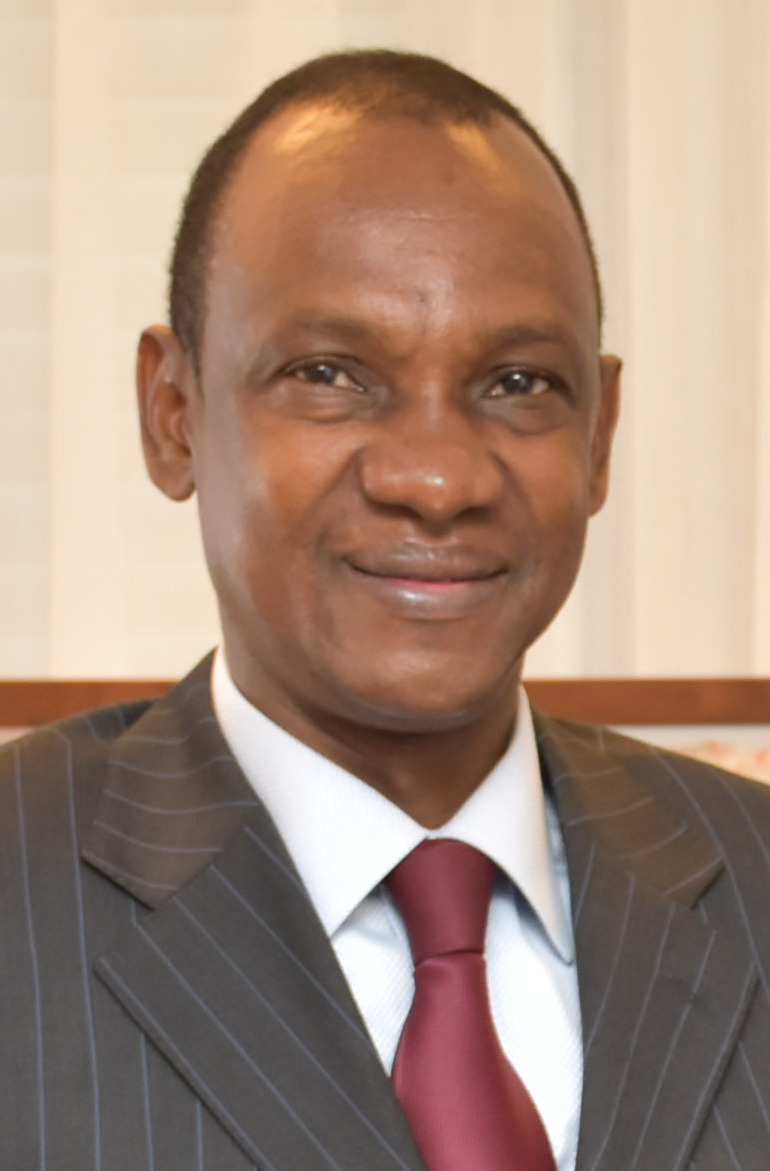
- Maïga in 2016

18th Prime Minister of Mali
- In office 6 June 2021 – 20 November 2024
- President: Assimi Goïta (interim)
- Preceded by: Moctar Ouane
- Succeeded by: Abdoulaye Maïga (interim)

Minister of the Digital Economy, Information and Communication
- In office 2015–2016
- Prime Minister: Modibo Keita

Minister of Industry and Trade
- In office 2002–2007
- Prime Minister: Ahmed Mohamed ag Hamani; Ousmane Issoufi Maïga

Personal details
- Born: Choguel Kokalla Maïga; 1958 (age 67–68) Tabango, Gao Region, French Sudan
- Party: Patriotic Movement for Renewal
- a: Suspended: 21 August 2022 – 5 December 2022 from treatment for stroke. During this period, Abdoulaye Maïga was interim prime minister.

Choguel Kokalla Maïga (born 1958) is a Malian politician, who served as the 18th prime minister of Mali from 2021 until his firing by Interim President Assimi Goïta in November 2024. He served in the government as Minister of Industry and Trade from 2002 to 2007 and later as Minister of the Digital Economy, Information and Communication from 2015 to 2016.

On 4 June 2021, he was named interim prime minister by coup leader and newly appointed President of Transition and Interim President, Assimi Goïta.

== Life and career ==
Born in Tabango, in the Gao Region of French Sudan, Maïga is a telecommunications engineer by profession, and is a close associate of Moussa Traoré. He was once a member of the National Youth Union of Mali. In February 1997 he became president of the Patriotic Movement for Renewal, a political party in Mali. In 2002 he stood for president, obtaining 2.73% of the votes in the first round before bowing out and supporting Amadou Toumani Touré. In the legislative election of the same year he aligned himself with Ibrahim Boubacar Keïta's Rally for Mali party and with the National Congress for Democratic Initiative, both part of the larger Hope 2002 coalition. Maïga was the Minister of Industry and Commerce in the government of Ahmed Mohamed ag Hamani, serving in that capacity from 16 October 2002, until 28 April 2004; he remained in that post under Ousmane Issoufi Maïga, serving from 2 May 2004 until 27 September 2007.

In December 2005, Maïga was the Malian representative at the Hong Kong WTO Doha Round trade negotiations. With cotton and food subsidies in the developed world dramatically affecting the Malian economy, Maïga was quoted saying "[The US and EU] are like elephants fighting. We are like the grass under their feet."

In the 2007 presidential election, Maïga did not stand as a candidate, instead once again supporting Amadou Toumani Touré. Following Touré's re-election, Maïga was appointed Director of the Telecommunications Regulatory Commission (CRT, later known as the AMRTP) in January 2008. He remained in that post until he was appointed to the government as Minister of the Digital Economy, Information and Communication on 10 January 2015. He was dismissed from the government on 7 July 2016.

On 28 May 2021, shortly after his coup against N'Daw and Moctar Ouane, Colonel Assimi Goïta announced that the post of Prime Minister would return to M5. The following day, Goïta reportedly spoke of his plans to appoint Choguel Maïga to the post.

In September 2021, at the podium of the United Nations General Assembly, Choguel Maïga accused France of having abandoned Mali by deciding to withdraw the Barkhane force. He also did not appreciate not having been warned by his "partners" Paris and the UN.

On 13 August 2022, Maïga suffered a stroke and was admitted to the Pasteur clinic in Bamako. No information about the reason for the stroke has been released. He was temporarily replaced on medical leave by Colonel Abdoulaye Maïga on 21 August 2022.

On 25 November 2022, Maïga said he recovered and he is ready to return as prime minister. On 5 December 2022, Maïga resumed his duties as prime minister.

In November 2024, Maïga called on Goïta to discuss the end of the “transition” period. Goïta sacked Maïga on November 20, 2024.

In January 2025, state auditors accused Maïga of embezzlement following findings of "undue expenditure on staff" from 2020 to 2023. Maïga denies the accusations. He was formally arrested on 12 August 2025.

== International sanctions ==
In February, 2022, the EU Council imposed personal sanctions on a group of Malian officials, including Maiga, citing their responsibility for obstructing and derailing a successful transition to an electoral democracy in Mali. Maiga in particular was accused of having failed to adhere to a transition agreement by postponing presidential elections, thus keeping the junta in power beyond the agreed time.

Political offices
Preceded by Moctar Ouane (Acting); Abdoulaye Maïga (Acting)	Prime Minister of Mali; 2021–2024	Succeeded by Abdoulaye Maïga (Acting)
