= Maigonis =

- Gender: Male

Origin
- Meaning: tender, mild, gentle
- Region of origin: Latvia

Other names
- Related names: Maigone, Maiga

Maigonis is a Latvian masculine given name. Its name day is September 6.

== Notable people named Maigonis ==
- Maigonis Valdmanis (1933—1999), Latvian basketball player
