= Council of Ministers of Mali =

The Council of Ministers of Mali (French: Conseil des ministres du Mali) consists of members appointed by the president with the advice of the prime minister.

The Council of Ministers is chaired by the prime minister and is tasked with managing government operations.

== Members of the Council of Ministers ==
As of February 2026 the cabinet consisted of the following.

OFFICE	NAME	TERM
Prime Minister	Abdoulaye Maïga
Minister of Foreign Affairs and International Cooperation; Minister of State	Abdoulaye Diop
Minister of Reconciliation, Peace, and National Cohesion; Minister of State	Ismael Wague
Minister of Defense and Veterans Affairs; Minister of State	Assimi Goïta
Minister of Economy and Finance; Minister of State	Alousseni Sanou
Minister of State for Refoundation and Relations with Institutions	Yaya Gologo
Minister of Health and Social Development	Assa Badiallo Toure
Minister of Justice, Human Rights, and Keeper of the Seals	Mahamadou Kassogue
Minister of Agriculture	Daniel Simeon Kelema
Minister of Communication, Digital Economy, and Administration Modernization	Alhamdon Ag Ilyene
Minister of Energy and Water	Tiemoko Traore
Minister of Culture, Handicrafts, Hotel Industry, and Tourism	Mamou Daffe
Minister of Environment, Sanitation, and Sustainable Development	Doumbia Mariam Tangara
Minister of Higher Education and Scientific Research	Bourema Kansaye
Minister of National Education	Amadou Sy Savane
Minister of Industry and Trade	Moussa Alassane Diallo
Minister of Transport and Infrastructure	Dembele Madina Sissoko
Minister of Labor, Civil Service, and Social Dialogue	Fassoun Coulibaly
Minister of Livestock and Fisheries	Youba Ba
Minister of Mines	Amadou Keita
Minister of National Entrepreneurship, Employment, and Vocational Training	Oumou Sall Seck
Minister of the Promotion of Women, Children, and Family	Diarra Djeneba Sanogo
Minister of Malians Living Abroad and African Integration	Mossa Ag Attaher
Minister of Religious Affairs and Worship	Mamadou Kone
Minister of Security and Civilian Protection	Daoud Aly Mohammedine
Minister of Territorial Administration and Decentralization	Issa Ousmane Coulibaly
Minister of Urban Planning, Housing, Estates, Regional Planning, & Population	Imirane Abdoulaye Toure
Minister of Youth and Sports	Abdoul Kassim Ibrahim Fomba
Minister Delegate of the Prime Minister, in charge of political and institutional reforms	Mamani Nassire
