= Moctar Ouane =

Malian politician

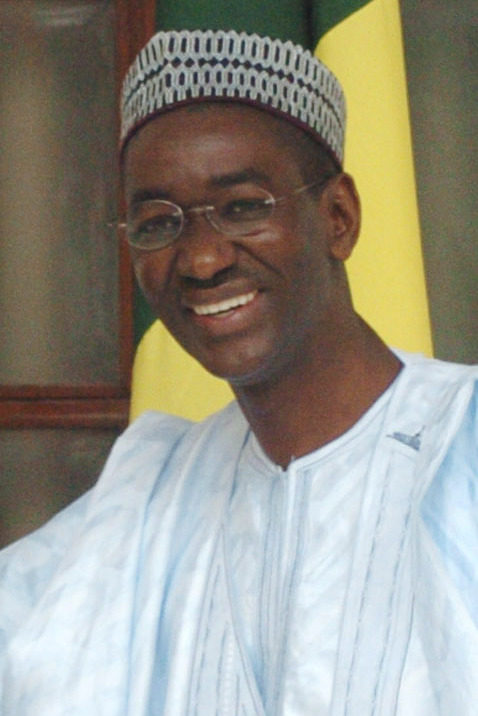
- Ouane in January 2009

Prime Minister of Mali Acting
- In office 27 September 2020 – 24 May 2021
- President: Bah Ndaw (Interim)
- Preceded by: Boubou Cissé
- Succeeded by: Choguel Kokalla Maïga (Interim)

Minister of Foreign Affairs
- In office 2004–2011
- President: Amadou Toumani Touré
- Preceded by: Lassana Traoré
- Succeeded by: Soumeylou Boubèye Maïga

Malian Ambassador to the United Nations
- In office 1995–2002
- President: Alpha Oumar Konaré

Personal details
- Born: Moctar Ouane; 11 October 1955 (age 70) Bidi, French Sudan (now Mali)

Moctar Ouane (born 11 October 1955) is a Malian diplomat and politician who served as the acting Prime Minister of Mali from 27 September 2020 to 24 May 2021, between the 2020 Malian coup d'état and the 2021 Malian coup d'état. He also previously served in the government of Mali as Minister of Foreign Affairs from May 2004 to April 2011.

== Diplomatic career ==
Ouane was technical advisor to the Secretary-General of the Government from 1982 to 1986, head of the Agreements and International Conventions Division at the Ministry for Foreign Affairs in 1986, diplomatic advisor to the Prime Minister from 1986 to 1988, chief of staff (chef de cabinet) of the Secretary-General of the Presidency from 1988 to 1990, diplomatic advisor to President Moussa Traoré from 1990 to 1991 and to transitional head of state Amadou Toumani Touré from 1991 to 1992, and then diplomatic advisor to the Prime Minister in 1992. He was political advisor to the Minister of Foreign Affairs from 1994 to 1995 before becoming Mali's Permanent Representative to the United Nations on 27 September 1995; he served in that post until 27 September 2002. During this time, he served as President of the United Nations Security Council in September 2000 and December 2001. He was Directing Ambassador of International Cooperation from 2003 to 2004 before being named Minister of Foreign Affairs on 2 May 2004.

After leaving office as Foreign Minister in 2011, Ouane became Diplomatic Adviser to the West African Economic and Monetary Union in January 2014. He became peace and security advisor for the institution in 2016.

He was appointed interim Prime Minister by interim President Bah Ndaw on 27 September 2020. He attempted to resign on 14 May 2021 but was swiftly reappointed to oversee a reshuffling of the cabinet. This reshuffling led to the 2021 Malian coup d'état, in which Ndaw and Ouane were deposed and stripped of their positions. Both leaders officially resigned on 26 May.

On 27 August 2021, Ouane was released from house arrest.

== See also ==
- Choguel Kokalla Maïga
- Abdoulaye Maïga (officer)
- Boubou Cissé

Political offices
Preceded by Lassana Traoré	Foreign Minister of Mali; 2004–2011	Succeeded by Soumeylou Boubèye Maïga
Preceded by Boubou Cissé	Prime Minister of Mali; 2020–2021	Succeeded by Choguel Kokalla Maïga
