= Minister of Finance (Mali) =

This article lists the ministers of finance of Mali since the creation of Mali Federation and independence of Mali:

== List of ministers of finance ==
- Attaher Maïga, 1959-1965
- Louis Negre, 1966-1970
- Amadou Baba Diarra, 1970-1973
- Tiéoulé Mamadou Konaté, 1973-1975
- Founèkè Keita, 1975-1978
- Amadou Baba Diarra, 1978-1979
- Mady Diallo, 1979-1980
- Drissa Keita, 1980-1984
- Dianka Kaba Diakite, 1984-1987
- Soumana Sacko, 1987
- Mohamed Alhousséyni Toure, 1987-1988
- Tiéna Coulibaly, 1988-1991
- Bassary Touré, 1991-1992
- Mahamar Oumar Maiga, 1992-1993
- Soumaila Cisse, 1993-2000
- Bakari Koné, 2000-2002
- Ousmane Issoufi Maïga, 2002
- Bassary Touré, 2002-2004
- Ousmane Issoufi Maiga, 2004
- Abou-Bakar Traoré, 2004-2008
- Ba Fatoumata Nènè Sy, 2008
- Ahmadou Abdoulaye Diallo, 2008-2009
- Sanoussi Touré, 2009-2011
- Lassine Bouaré, 2011-2012
- Tiéna Coulibaly, 2012-2013
- Abdel Karim Konaté, 2013
- Bouaré Fily Sissoko, 2013-2015
- Mamadou Igor Diarra, 2015-2016
- Boubou Cissé, 2016-2020
- Abdoulaye Daffé, 2020-

== See also ==
- Economy of Mali
