= Amadou Baba Diarra =

Amadou Baba Diarra was a Malian politician and military figure. Diarra was the second vice president of ruling junta from 1968 to 1979.

He was born ca. 1933 in Diena, in Koutiala Cercle. He volunteered in the French colonial army in 1953. He became second lieutenant in February 1965, and lieutenant two years later.

Diarra was a member of the ruling junta which took power and ousted Modibo Keïta on 19 November 1968. Lieutenant Diarra was appointed second vice president of the junta. He was promoted to the rank of captain in October 1971. Diarra was appointed as Minister of Finance from 1970 to 1973, and Minister of Planning in 1975.

Diarra was promoted colonel in 1978, and served again as Minister of Finance from 1978 to 1979. In the same year he became deputy secretary general of the sole legal party, Democratic Union of the Malian People (UDPM). He was promoted to brigadier general in October 1982 and division general four years later. He successively became Minister of State in charge of Equipment (1983-1985), Minister of State in charge of Planning (1985-1988), before be appointed as president of the Economic and Social Council until March 1991. He retired in 1992 when Moussa Traoré was deposed.

He died in May 2008.
