= Lassana Traoré (politician) =

Malian politician and diplomat

Lassana Traoré (born 1945) is a Malian political figure and diplomat who served as Minister of Foreign Affairs of Mali from 2002 to 2004.

Traoré was born in Bamako. During the rule of Moussa Traoré, he was Deputy Secretary-General of the Presidency of the Republic; subsequently he was head of the cabinet of Amadou Toumani Touré during Touré's transitional military rule from 1991 to 1992.

Traoré was Touré's campaign director during the 2002 presidential election, and after Touré's victory, he appointed Traoré as Minister of Foreign Affairs and Malians Living Abroad in the government named on June 14, 2002. Traoré served as Foreign Minister until he was replaced by Moctar Ouane in 2004.

Preceded by Modibo Sidibé	Foreign Minister of Mali; 2002–2004	Succeeded by Moctar Ouane
