= 2017 Valan International Cargo Charter Antonov An-26 crash =

Aviation accident in the Ivory Coast

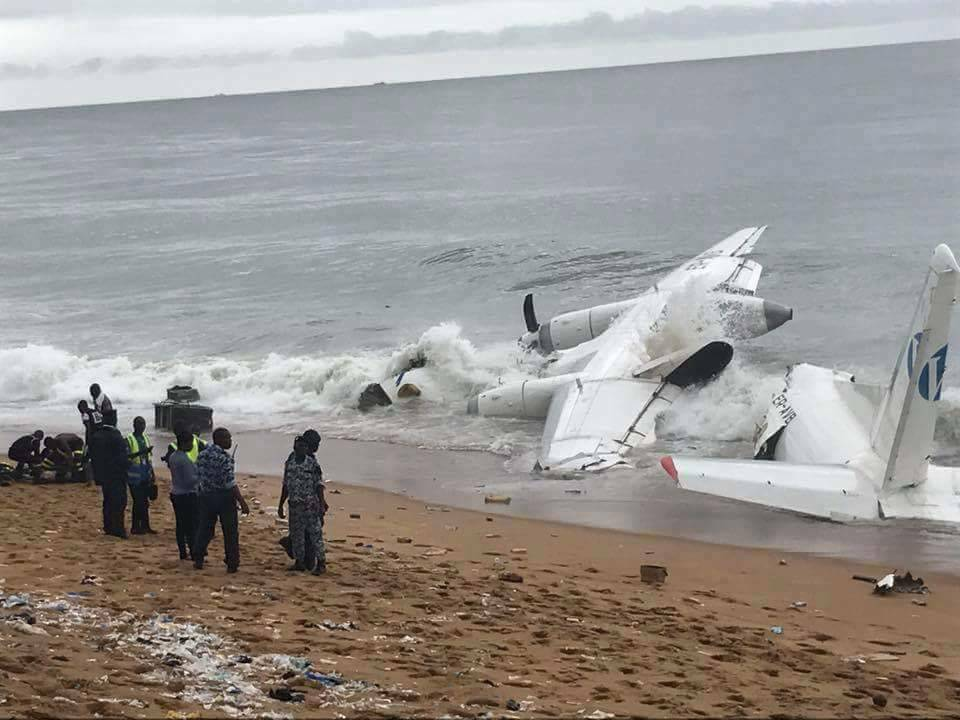
- Rescue operation at the crash site

Accident
- Date: 14 October 2017
- Summary: Controlled flight into terrain during approach in poor weather due to pilot error and loss of situational awareness
- Site: Abidjan, Ivory Coast

Aircraft
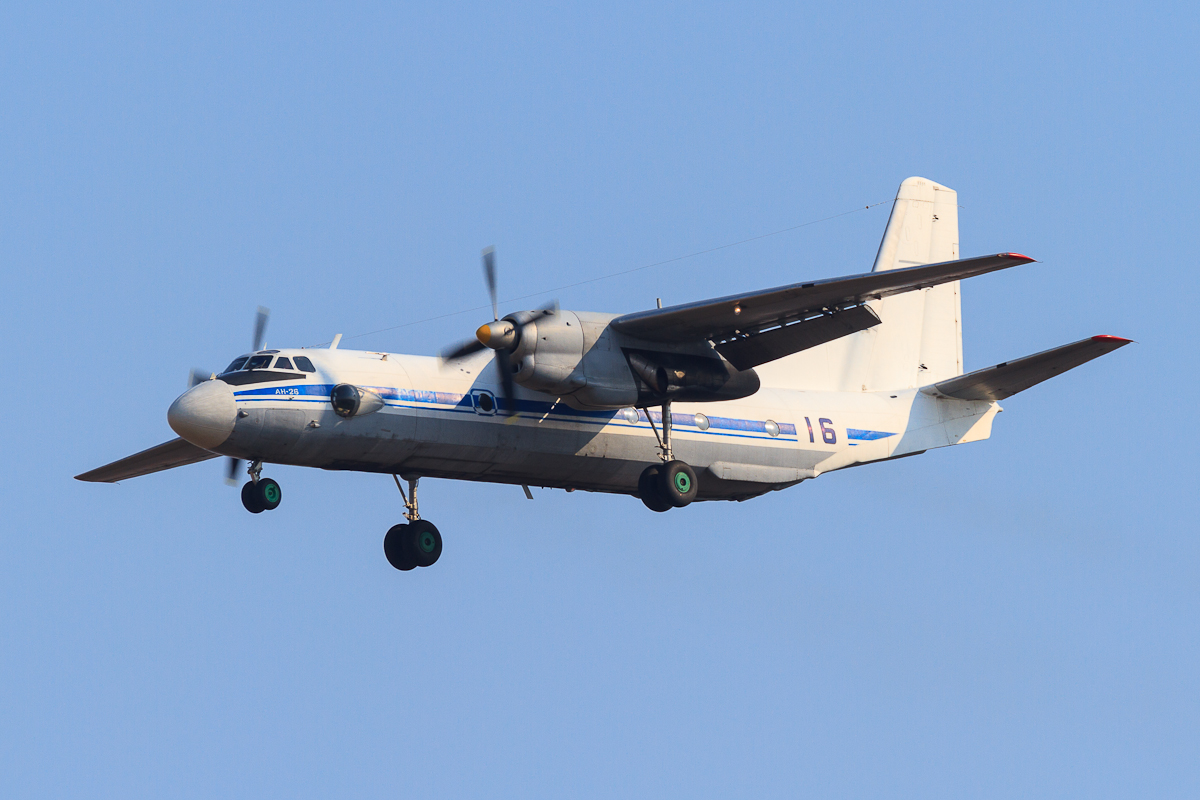
- An Antonov An-26 similar to the accident aircraft
- Aircraft type: Antonov An-26-100
- Operator: Valan International Cargo Charter
- Registration: ER-AVB
- Flight origin: Ouagadougou Airport, Burkina Faso
- Destination: Félix-Houphouët-Boigny International Airport, Abidjan, Ivory Coast
- Occupants: 10
- Passengers: 7
- Crew: 3
- Fatalities: 4
- Injuries: 6
- Survivors: 6

On 14 October 2017, an Antonov An-26 transport aircraft of Valan International Cargo Charter crashed shortly before it was due to land at Félix-Houphouët-Boigny International Airport, Abidjan, Ivory Coast. Four of the ten people on board were killed.

== Accident ==
The aircraft was operating a flight from Ouagadougou Airport, Burkina Faso to Félix Houphouët Boigny International Airport, Abidjan. It crashed on the coast of the Ivory Coast shortly before landing. It broke in two during the accident. It was carrying six Moldovan crew and four French Army personnel. Three crew members were killed along with one passenger. One of the six survivors was seriously injured. The aircraft had been chartered by the French Army and was operating in support of Operation Barkhane. The injured were transferred to the Port-Bouet camp for treatment. A thunderstorm was reported in the area at the time of the accident, about 08:30 local time (UTC).

== Aircraft ==
The accident aircraft was an Antonov An-26-100, registration ER-AVB, msn 3204. The aircraft had first flown in 1975.

== Investigation ==
Authorities in the Ivory Coast opened an investigation into the accident. The Civil Aviation Authority of Moldova was assisting the investigation. The flight data recorder and cockpit voice recorder were recovered from the wreckage of the aircraft.

The Ivorian BEA released its final report in August 2019.
