= Soumeylou Boubèye Maïga =

Malian politician (1954–2022)

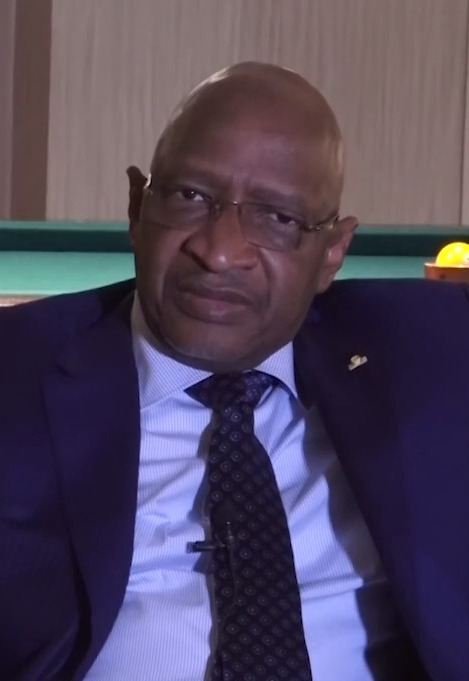
- Maïga in 2019

16th Prime Minister of Mali
- In office 30 December 2017 – 18 April 2019
- President: Ibrahim Boubacar Keïta
- Preceded by: Abdoulaye Idrissa Maïga
- Succeeded by: Boubou Cissé

Minister of Defense and Veterans Affairs
- In office 8 September 2013 – 28 May 2014
- President: Ibrahim Boubacar Keïta
- Prime Minister: Oumar Tatam Ly; Moussa Mara
- Preceded by: Yamoussa Camara
- Succeeded by: Bah N'Daw

Foreign Minister of Mali
- In office 6 April 2011 – 22 March 2012
- President: Amadou Toumani Touré
- Prime Minister: Cissé Mariam Kaïdama Sidibé
- Preceded by: Moctar Ouane
- Succeeded by: Sadio Lamine Sow

Personal details
- Born: 8 June 1954 Gao, French Sudan, French West Africa, France (now Mali)
- Died: 21 March 2022 (aged 67) Bamako, Mali
- Party: Alliance for Solidarity in Mali

Soumeylou Boubèye Maïga (French pronunciation: [sumelu bubɛj maiga]; 8 June 1954 – 21 March 2022) was a Malian politician who was the Prime Minister of Mali between 30 December 2017 and 18 April 2019. The leader of the Alliance for Solidarity in Mali, he had previously served in the government of Mali as Minister of Foreign Affairs under President Amadou Toumani Touré from 5 April 2011 until the March 2012 coup d'état. Later he was Minister of Defense from 2013 to 2014 and was Secretary-General of the Presidency from 2016 to 2017.

== Early life and career ==
Soumeylou Boubèye Maïga was born in Gao on 8 June 1954. He studied journalism from Cheikh Anta Diop University's Center for the Study of Information Science and Technology. In 1987, he graduated from the Paris-Sud University with a Diploma of Specialized Higher Studies (DESS) in diplomacy and international organisation management. Soumeylou also held a master's degree in international economic relations from Paris's Institut d'administration. He began his career as a journalist at L'Essor and then worked at the Malian Press and Advertising Agency's magazine Sunjata.

== Political career ==
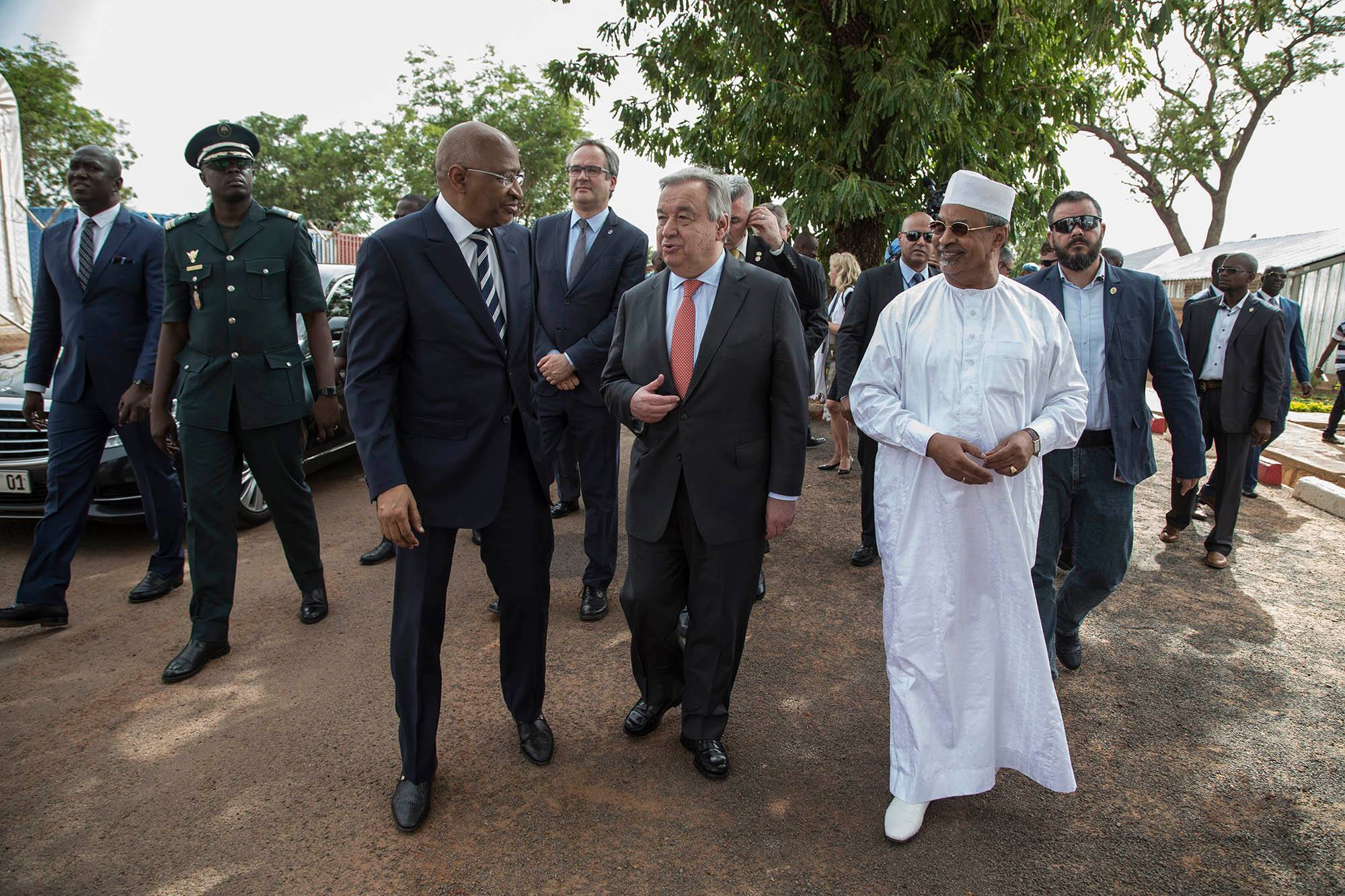
Maïga (left) with António Guterres, Secretary-General of the United Nations, on 29 May 2018 in Bamako, Mali.

As first vice-president of ADEMA-PASJ, Maïga opposed the party's decision to support President Amadou Toumani Touré's bid for re-election in the April 2007 presidential election, and he was consequently expelled from the party.

Along with several other ministers, he was arrested during the coup when rebel soldiers stormed the presidential palace on 22 March 2012. On 25 March, he began a hunger strike along with 13 other arrested officials to protest his detention.

After Ibrahim Boubacar Keïta won the 2013 presidential election, Maïga was appointed to the government as Minister of Defense on 8 September 2013. He was replaced by Bah Ndaw following the army's defeat at the hands of Tuareg rebels in Kidal in May 2014. Although some blamed him for the defeat, others believed he was being used as a scapegoat.

On 29 August 2016, he was appointed Secretary-General of the Presidency with the rank of minister.

Maïga was named Prime Minister on 30 December 2017. He resigned on 18 April 2019 amid public protests following the Ogossagou massacre.

== Personal life and death ==
Maiga died in detention in Bamako on 21 March 2022 at the age of 67.

Political offices
Preceded by Abdoulaye Idrissa Maïga	Prime Minister of Mali; 2017–2019	Succeeded by Boubou Cisse
