= List of prime ministers of Mali =

Prime Minister of the Republic of Mali
- Mali minisiri ɲɛmɔgɔ (Bambara)
- Emblem of Mali

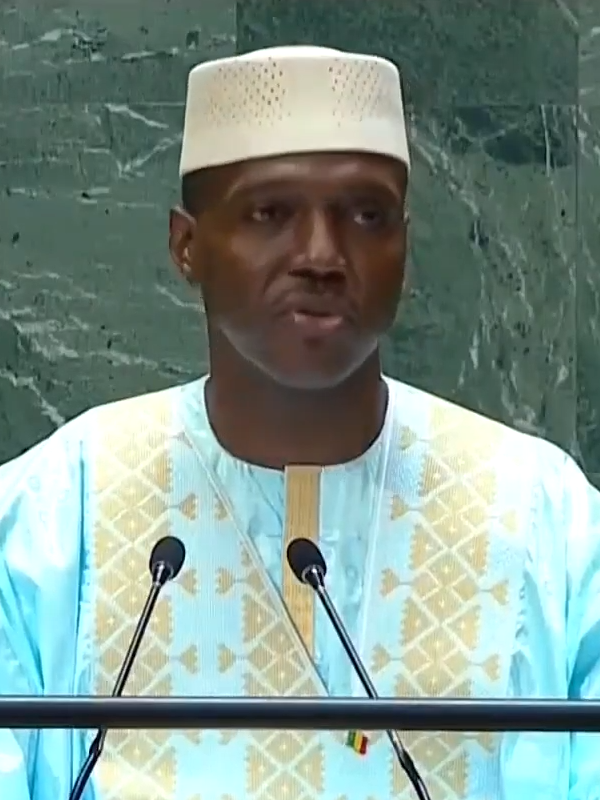
- Incumbent; Abdoulaye Maïga; Acting since 21 November 2024
- Reports to: President
- Appointer: President
- Formation: 20 June 1960; 66 years ago
- First holder: Modibo Keïta
- Salary: CFA 14,201,498/US$23,280 annually
- Website: La Primature

This is a list of prime ministers of Mali since the country gained independence from France in 1960 to the present day. The prime minister heads the Council of Ministers.

A total of seventeen people have served as Prime Minister of Mali (not counting five acting prime ministers). Additionally, one person, Modibo Keita, served on two non-consecutive occasions.

The current Interim Prime Minister of Mali is Abdoulaye Maïga, since 21 November 2024. He was appointed by the National Committee for the Salvation of the People, which has governed the country since the 2021 Malian coup d'état.

The 2023 constitutional referendum brought a new constitution into force on July 22, 2023, which reduced the powers of the prime minister significantly. The prime minister and government are now responsible to the president rather than parliament, and the president heads and directs the policy of the government.

== List of officeholders ==
Political parties

Sudanese Union – African Democratic Rally (US–RDA)
Democratic Union of the Malian People (UDPM)
Alliance for Democracy in Mali – Pan-African Party for Liberty, Solidarity and Justice (ADEMA–PASJ)
Rally for Mali (RPM)
Alliance for Solidarity in Mali (ASMA-CFP)

Other factions

Military
Independent

Status

Acting Prime Minister

No.	Portrait	Name (Birth–Death)	Term of office			Political party	Cabinet(s)	Head(s) of state	Ref.
No.	Portrait	Name (Birth–Death)	Took office	Left office	Time in office	Political party	Cabinet(s)	Head(s) of state	Ref.
1		Modibo Keïta (1915–1977)	20 June 1960	1965	c. 5 years	US–RDA	Keïta	Himself	
Post abolished (1965 – 19 November 1968)
2		Yoro Diakité (1932–1973)	19 November 1968	18 September 1969	303 days	Military	Diakité	M. Traoré	
Post abolished (18 September 1969 – 6 June 1986)
3		Mamadou Dembelé (1934–2016)	6 June 1986	6 June 1988	2 years	UDPM	Dembelé	M. Traoré	
Post abolished (6 June 1988 – 2 April 1991)
–		Soumana Sacko (1950–2025) acting	2 April 1991	9 June 1992	1 year, 68 days	Independent	Sacko	Touré	
–		Soumana Sacko (1950–2025) acting	2 April 1991	9 June 1992	1 year, 68 days	Independent	Sacko	Konaré	
4		Younoussi Touré (1941–2022)	9 June 1992	12 April 1993	307 days	Independent	Touré	Konaré	
5		Abdoulaye Sékou Sow (1931–2013)	12 April 1993	4 February 1994	298 days	Independent	Sow	Konaré	
6		Ibrahim Boubacar Keïta (1945–2022)	4 February 1994	15 February 2000	6 years, 11 days	ADEMA–PASJ	I. Keïta	Konaré	
7		Mandé Sidibé (1940–2009)	15 February 2000	18 March 2002	2 years, 31 days	ADEMA–PASJ	Ma. Sidibé	Konaré	
8		Modibo Keita (1942–2021)	18 March 2002	9 June 2002	83 days	Independent	Keïta I	Konaré	
9		Ahmed Mohamed ag Hamani (born 1942)	9 June 2002	29 April 2004	1 year, 325 days	Independent	Hamani	Touré	
10		Ousmane Issoufi Maïga (born 1946)	29 April 2004	28 September 2007	3 years, 152 days	Independent	O. Maïga	Touré	
11		Modibo Sidibé (born 1952) (Note: Brother of Mandé Sidibé.)	28 September 2007	3 April 2011	3 years, 187 days	Independent	Mo. Sidibé I	Touré	
11		Modibo Sidibé (born 1952)	28 September 2007	3 April 2011	3 years, 187 days	Independent	Mo. Sidibé II	Touré	
12		Cissé Mariam Kaïdama Sidibé (1948–2021)	3 April 2011	22 March 2012 (deposed)	354 days	Independent	C. Sidibé	Touré	
Vacant (22 March – 17 April 2012)
–		Cheick Modibo Diarra (born 1952) acting	17 April 2012	11 December 2012 (resigned)	238 days	Independent	Diarra I	D. Traoré	
–		Cheick Modibo Diarra (born 1952) acting	17 April 2012	11 December 2012 (resigned)	238 days	Independent	Diarra II	D. Traoré	
–		Django Sissoko (1948–2022) acting	11 December 2012	5 September 2013	268 days	Independent	Sissoko I	D. Traoré	
–		Django Sissoko (1948–2022) acting	11 December 2012	5 September 2013	268 days	Independent	Sissoko II	D. Traoré	
13		Oumar Tatam Ly (born 1963)	5 September 2013	5 April 2014	212 days	Independent	Ly	I. B. Keïta	
14		Moussa Mara (born 1975)	5 April 2014	9 January 2015	279 days	Independent	Mara	I. B. Keïta	
(8)		Modibo Keita (1942–2021)	9 January 2015	10 April 2017	2 years, 91 days	Independent	Keïta II	I. B. Keïta	
15		Abdoulaye Idrissa Maïga (born 1958)	10 April 2017	31 December 2017 (resigned)	265 days	RPM	A. I. Maïga	I. B. Keïta	
16		Soumeylou Boubèye Maïga (1954–2022)	31 December 2017	18 April 2019 (Note: Lost confidence of Parliament.)	1 year, 108 days	ASMA-CFP	S. Maïga	I. B. Keïta	
Vacant (18 April – 23 April 2019)
17		Boubou Cissé (born 1974)	23 April 2019	18 August 2020 (deposed)	1 year, 118 days	Independent	Cissé I	I. B. Keïta	
17		Boubou Cissé (born 1974)	23 April 2019	18 August 2020 (deposed)	1 year, 118 days	Independent	Cissé II	I. B. Keïta	
Vacant (18 August – 27 September 2020)
–		Moctar Ouane (born 1955) acting	27 September 2020	24 May 2021 (deposed)	239 days	Independent	Ouane I	B. Ndaw	
–		Moctar Ouane (born 1955) acting	27 September 2020	24 May 2021 (deposed)	239 days	Independent	Ouane II	B. Ndaw	
Vacant (24 May – 6 June 2021)
18		Choguel Kokalla Maïga (born 1958)	6 June 2021	20 November 2024 (Note: Suspended from work for 3 months due to stroke treatment.)	3 years, 167 days	Independent	C. Maïga	A. Goïta	
–		Abdoulaye Maïga (born 1981) acting	21 August 2022	5 December 2022	106 days	Military	A. Maïga	A. Goïta	
–		Abdoulaye Maïga (born 1981) acting	21 November 2024	Incumbent	1 year, 309 days	Military	A. Maïga	A. Goïta	

== See also ==
- Politics of Mali
- List of heads of state of Mali
- Vice President of Mali
- First Lady of Mali
- List of colonial governors of Mali
