= Mandé Sidibé =

7th Prime Minister of Mali
- In office 15 February 2000 – 18 March 2002
- President: Alpha Oumar Konare
- Preceded by: Ibrahim Boubacar Keïta
- Succeeded by: Modibo Keita

Personal details
- Born: 20 January 1940 Bafoulabé, French Sudan, French West Africa
- Died: 25 August 2009 (aged 69) Paris, France
- Education: George Washington University

Mandé Sidibé (20 January 1940 – 25 August 2009) was Prime Minister of Mali from 2000 to 2002 and chairman of the Board of Directors of Ecobank from 2006 to 2009. He was also Director of the Malian branch of the Central Bank of West African States (Banque Centrale des États de l'Afrique de l'Ouest, BCEAO) from 1992 to 1995.

== Biography ==
=== Personal life ===
Sidibé was born in Bafoulabé, Mali, and raised in Bamako. He was the son of Mamadou Sidibé, a captain in the French Army. He attended the Terrasson de Fougères High School in Bamako, before leaving for France in 1959, where he obtained his Baccalauréat in 1960 at the Académie de Bordeaux. He also graduated with a degree in Economic Sciences (licence ès sciences économiques) in 1965 from the University of Paris.

Sidibé is the brother of the Modibo Sidibé, a prominent politician who was the Prime Minister of Mali from 2007 until he resigned in 2011.

=== Career ===
Upon his return to Mali, he started working at Bank of the Republic of Mali (BRM). Then, in 1967, he was offered and opportunity at the International Monetary Fund (IMF) as an Economist in the Africa Department. He held several positions at the IMF, including a resident advisor role in Chad from 1975 to 1977. He went on to become the divisional head, Africa Department. While at the IMF, he attended the George Washington University, from which he graduated with a Masters in Business Administration in 1974.

In 1985, Mandé Sidibé left the IMF to join the BCEAO in various capacities, including Secretary General in charge of monetary policies and special advisor to the governor of BCEAO. From 1992 to 1995, he was the Director of BCEAO-Mali, while still retaining his role as a special advisor to the governor. In 1996, Mandé Sidibé became special advisor to Malian President Alpha Oumar Konaré.

From 2000 to 2002 Mandé Sidibé served as Prime Minister of Mali. He was a candidate in the April 2002 presidential election, winning 2.01% of the vote and placing ninth.

Sidibé served on the Board of Directors of Ecobank Transnational Incorporated (ETI), a private sector banking group based in 13 countries of West Africa and Central Africa (Benin, Burkina Faso, Cameroon, Cape Verde, Côte d'Ivoire, Ghana, Guinea, Liberia, Mali, Niger, Nigeria, Senegal and Togo), from 2003 to 2006. In 2006, he was appointed Chairman of the Ecobank Board of Directors.

Mandé Sidibé died on August 25, 2009, in Paris at the age of 69 after a brief illness.
