= Bassary Touré =

Malian politician (born 1950)

Bassary Touré (born February 1, 1950, in Thiès, Senegal) is a Malian economist and politician. Touré was the Minister of Finance of Mali from 1991 to 1992 and from 2002 to 2004. He has been an executive director with the World Bank. He is also part of the United Nations Commission on HIV/AIDS and Governance in Africa. Additionally, he has been vice-president of the West African Development Bank (BOAD : Banque ouest-africaine de développement) in Lomé, Togo. He is now retired.
