= National School of Administration (Mali) =

- École nationale d'administration
- Former names: École d'administration du Soudan (1958-1963)
- Type: Public institution with scientific and technological character
- Active: 1958–1993, reopened 2006
- Location: Bamako, Mali; 12.653232°N 8.001178°W
- Website: enamali.ml

The National School of Administration (Éna) is a higher education institution in Mali, created in 1958 under the name École d'administration du Soudan. It is attached to the Prime Minister's office of Mali and is located in Bamako.

== History ==
In 1958, the École d'administration du Soudan was established when Mali was still a French colony, known as the French Sudan.

In 1963, the school was renamed the National School of Administration. It was responsible for training category A civil servants and category B civil servants until the creation of the Central School for Industry, Commerce, and Administration (Écica) in 1969. The Éna also provided political training for executives.

In 1972, the National School of Administration was reorganized and became a higher education institution.

Following the establishment of the University of Mali in 1993, the Éna was dissolved. In 2006, the National School of Administration was re-established as a public institution with a scientific and technological character, tasked with the initial training of certain category A civil servants, ongoing training and improvement of category A and B executives, and conducting studies and research. It began operations in 2009.
