= Oumar Tatam Ly =

Malian politician and Prime Minister

13th Prime Minister of Mali
- In office 5 September 2013 – 5 April 2014
- President: Ibrahim Boubacar Keïta
- Preceded by: Django Sissoko (Acting)
- Succeeded by: Moussa Mara

Personal details
- Born: 28 September 1963 (age 63) Paris, France
- Party: Independent
- Education: University of Paris; Graduate School of Economic and Commercial Sciences

Oumar Tatam Ly (born 28 September 1963) is a Malian politician who was Prime Minister of Mali from 5 September 2013 to 5 April 2014. He was previously a special adviser at the Central Bank of West African States.

== Early life and education ==
Oumar Tatam Ly was born in 1963 in Paris. His father was Ibrahima Ly, a political activist during Moussa Traoré's rule, and his mother was Madina Ly-Tall, who was an ambassador during Alpha Oumar Konaré's presidency. Tatum Ly holds a degree in economics from Panthéon-Sorbonne University and a Masters from ESSEC Business School. He also received a diploma from École normale supérieure de Lyon.

== Career ==
Tatam Ly originally started working at the World Bank before moving to the Central Bank of West African States in 1994. During his career at the BCEAO, he was promoted from director of finance to special advisor.

=== Prime minister ===
Tatam Ly was appointed Prime Minister of Mali by President Ibrahim Boubacar Keïta on 5 September 2013, a day after Keïta was sworn in as President. After being sworn in, Tatam Ly focused on achieving the President's promises of bringing the people of Mali together and ending Mali's systemic corruption. In order to fulfill Keita's promises, Tatam Ly created the post of Minister of Reconciliation and assigned the position to Cheick Ouamar Diarrah.

At the end of November 2013, his proposed visit to the northern city of Kidal and the consequent police repression of protests led to the MNLA aborting the ceasefire agreement.

Tatam Ly and his cabinet resigned on 5 April 2014. Moussa Mara was appointed to replace him on the same day.

Political offices
Preceded by Django Sissoko; Acting	Prime Minister of Mali; 2013–2014	Succeeded by Moussa Mara
