= Abdel Karim Konaté =

Malian politician

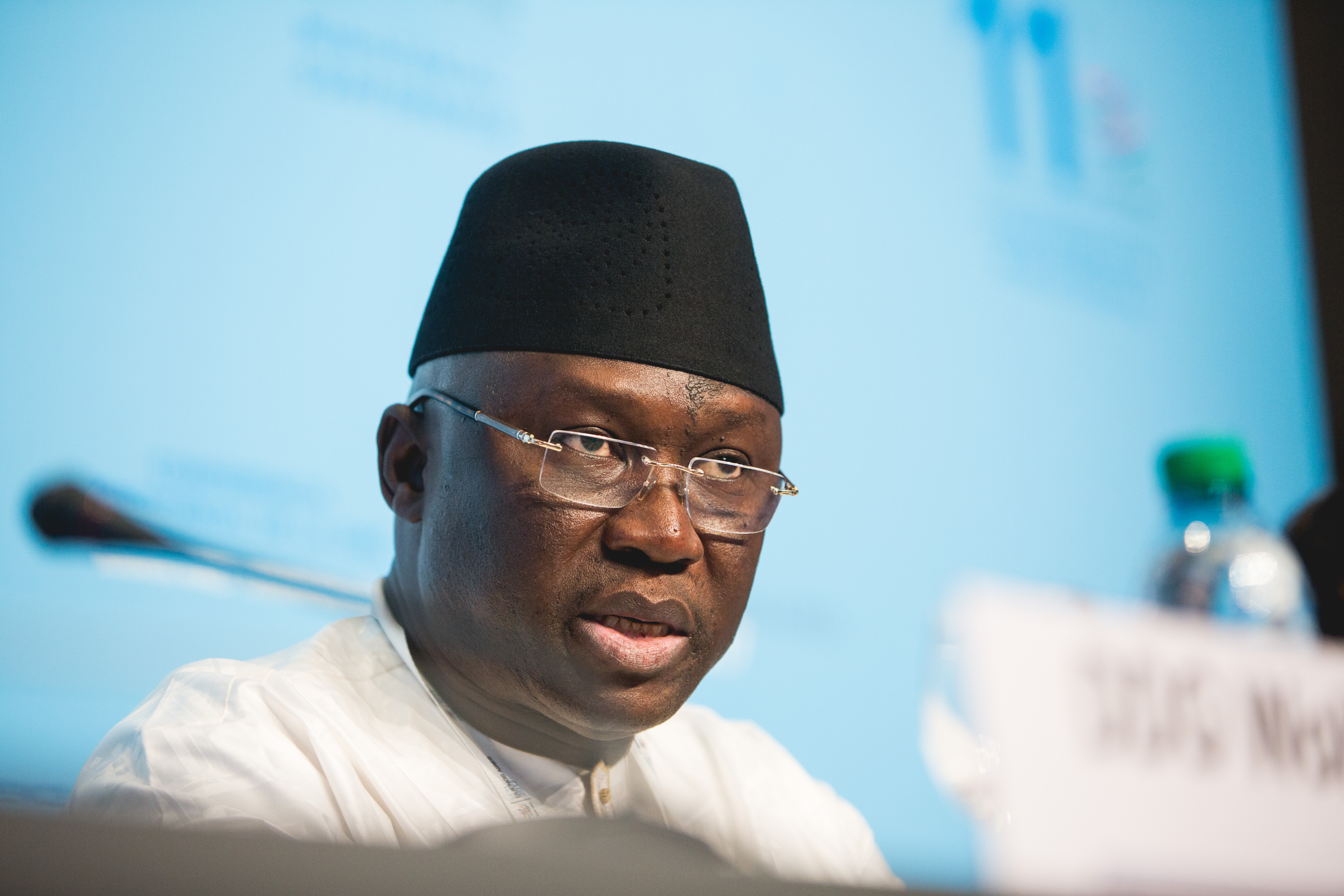
WTO ITC cotton portal launch event, 11 December 2017

Abdel Karim Konate is a Malian politician from ADEMA. He was the Minister of Finance in 2013. He serves as the Malian Minister of Commerce.
