= Boubou Cissé =

Malian politician (born 1974)

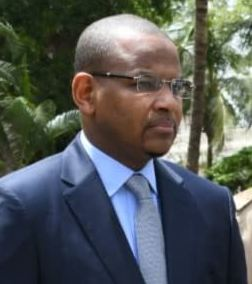
- Boubou Cissé in June 2019

17th Prime Minister of Mali
- In office 23 April 2019 – 18 August 2020
- President: Ibrahim Boubacar Keïta
- Preceded by: Soumeylou Boubèye Maïga
- Succeeded by: Moctar Ouane

Personal details
- Born: 1974 (age 51–52) Bamako, Mali
- Education: University of Auvergne; Aix-Marseille University

Boubou Cissé (born 1974) is a Malian politician who served as Prime Minister of Mali from 2019 to 2020, before being removed from office as a result of the 2020 Malian coup d'état. Prior to his tenure as prime minister he was Minister of Industry and Mines and Minister of Economy and Finance.

== Early life and education ==
Boubou Cissé was born in Bamako, Mali, in 1974. His brother, Baba Cissé, served as president of the Alliance for Solidarity in Mali. He graduated from the University of Auvergne with a master's degree in economic sciences, and from the University of the Mediterranean with a doctorate in economic sciences.

== Career ==
Cissé joined the World Bank in 2005. He worked for the World Bank as an economist from 2005 to 2013. He worked in Nigeria and Niger as its resident representative. He was appointed Minister of Industry and Mines in 2013, and Minister of Economy and Finance in 2016.

President Ibrahim Boubacar Keïta appointed Cissé to succeed Soumeylou Boubèye Maïga as Prime Minister of Mali on 23 April 2019. His lack of experience in defence and foreign policy was noted by western observers. Cissé was not a member of a political party at the time of his appointment. His cabinet consisted of 36 people, with 8 of them being female.

In July 2020, Cissé refused to resign as prime minister. Keïta was overthrown by the 2020 Malian coup d'état and placed under arrest with Cissé. Cissé and other imprisoned political leaders were released in October. He left Mali and went to live with members of his family in Niger.

== Works cited ==
=== News ===
- "Mali: le nouveau gouvernement de Boubou Cissé dévoilé". Jeune Afrique. 5 May 2019. Archived from the original on 9 July 2025.
- Ahmed, Baba (23 April 2019). "Mali: Boubou Cissé, un économiste à la primature en pleine crise sécuritaire". Jeune Afrique. Archived from the original on 9 July 2025.
- Fisayo-Bambi, Jerry (10 October 2020). "Mali: Ex Prime Minister Boubou Cissé, others released". Africanews. Archived from the original on 11 October 2020.
- Kelly, Jeremy (19 August 2020). "Mali's president resigns and dissolves parliament after being detained by military". The Times. Archived from the original on 9 July 2025.
- Laplace, Manon (7 November 2022). "Mali: Boubou Cissé, les vérités d'un exilé". Jeune Afrique. Archived from the original on 9 July 2025.
- Topona, Eric; Fröhlich, Silja (30 July 2020). "Malian PM Boubou Cisse says he will not resign". Deutsche Welle. Archived from the original on 9 July 2025.

=== Web ===
- "Boubou Cissé". World Economic Forum. Archived from the original on 9 July 2025.
- "Boubou Cissé". Africa Confidential. Archived from the original on 9 July 2025.

Political offices
Preceded by Soumeylou Boubèye Maïga	Prime Minister of Mali; 2019–2020	Succeeded by Moctar Ouane
