= Ousmane Issoufi Maïga =

Malian prime minister (born 1946)

Ousmane Issoufi Maïga (born 1946) was the Prime Minister of Mali from 2004 to 2007. Issoufi had previously held several ministerial posts in previous governments.

Issoufi was born near Gao, in the north of Mali. He studied economics at the University of Kyiv (Ukraine ― at the time part of the USSR) and then at the American University in Washington, DC, where he graduated with a degree in banking and finance. He has worked for the World Bank and in the French Ministry of Finance, where he was Assistant Director of the Caisse autonome d’amortissement (Autonomous Debt Financing Fund).

Following the ouster of Moussa Traoré in March 1991, Maïga became Minister in charge of the State Contrôle Général in the transitional government. He later became Secretary-General of the Ministry of Finance before being appointed Minister of Youth and Sports on June 23, 2001. In this position, he organised Mali's hosting of the African Nations Cup in 2002.

After the election of Amadou Toumani Touré as President, Issoufi became Minister of the Economy and Finance on June 14, 2002, serving under Prime Minister Ahmed Mohamed ag Hamani. Subsequently, in the government named on October 16, 2002, he became Minister of Equipment and Transport.

He remained Minister of Equipment and Transport until he was named Prime Minister on April 29, 2004. After Touré was sworn in for a second term as President, Maïga presented his resignation on June 9, 2007, but Touré asked the government to remain in place. Following the July 2007 parliamentary election, he again presented his government's resignation, which Touré accepted, on September 27, 2007. Touré thanked him for his work as Prime Minister and appointed Modibo Sidibé as his successor on September 28.

Political offices
Preceded by ?	Minister of Youth and Sports of Mali; 2001–2002	Succeeded by Djibril Tangara
Preceded by Bakari Koné	Minister of Economy and Finance of Mali; 2002	Succeeded by Bassary Touré
Preceded by ?	Minister of Equipment and Transport of Mali; 2002–2004	Succeeded by ?
Preceded by Ahmed Mohamed ag Hamani	Prime Minister of Mali; 2004–2007	Succeeded by Modibo Sidibé
