= List of ambassadors of Mali to the United States =

Coordinates: 38.912222°N 77.048056°W

Ambassador of Mali to the United States Embassy of Mali, Washington, D.C.
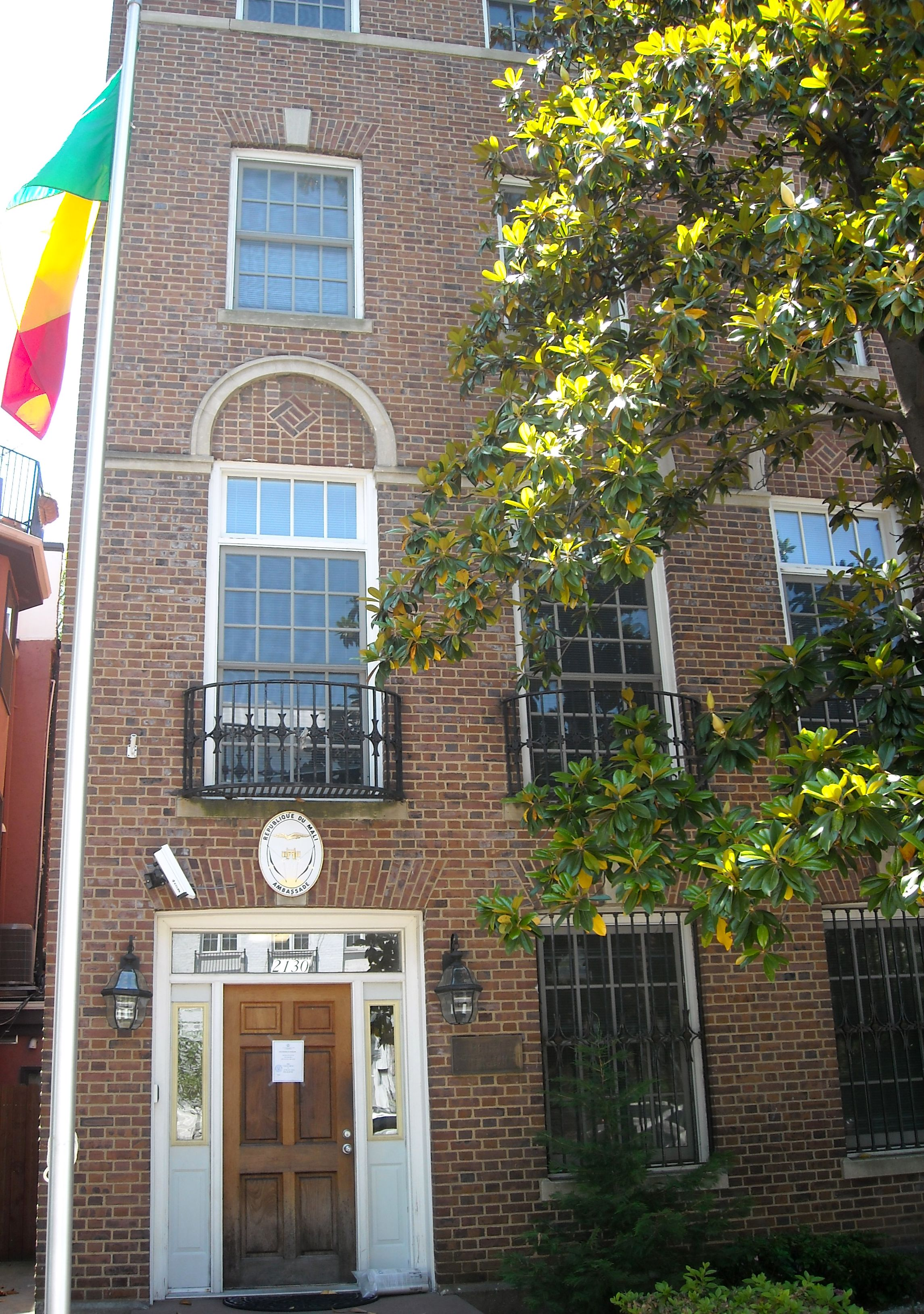
- Inaugural holder: Abdoulaye Maïga
- Formation: December 27, 1960

The Malian ambassador in Washington, D. C. is the official representative of the Government in Bamako to the Government of the United States.

== List of representatives ==
Diplomatic agrément	Diplomatic accreditation	Ambassador	Observations	List of heads of state of Mali	List of presidents of the United States	Term end
December 27, 1960			EMBASSY OPENED	Modibo Keïta	Dwight D. Eisenhower	
December 1, 1960	December 27, 1960	Abdoulaye Maïga	leader of the Patriotic Ganda Koi Front, *In 1964 he was Ambassador in Prague (Czechoslovakia and concurrently also accredited to Bulgaria and Rumania).	Modibo Keïta	Dwight D. Eisenhower	
April 17, 1962	May 11, 1962	Oumar Sow	*In 1962 he was ambassador in Ghana	Modibo Keïta	John F. Kennedy	
November 16, 1964	December 15, 1964	Moussa Léo Keita		Modibo Keïta	Lyndon B. Johnson	
October 8, 1969	October 10, 1969	Seydou Traore		Modibo Keïta	Richard Nixon	
May 7, 1975		Alpha Amadou Diaw	Chargé d'affaires February 7, 1980 he was accredited as ambassador in East Berlin.	Modibo Keïta	Gerald Ford	
August 6, 1975	September 3, 1975	Mamadou Boubacar Kante		Modibo Keïta	Gerald Ford	
July 12, 1976		Alpha Amadou Diaw	Chargé d'affaires	Modibo Keïta	Gerald Ford	
October 1, 1976	November 24, 1976	Ibrahima Sima		Modibo Keïta	Gerald Ford	
May 2, 1978		Alpha Amadou Diaw	Chargé d'affaires	Modibo Keïta	Jimmy Carter	
September 26, 1978	November 16, 1978	Macky Koreissi Aguibou Tall		Modibo Keïta	Jimmy Carter	
February 14, 1983	March 17, 1983	Lassana Keita		Modibo Keïta	Ronald Reagan	
May 21, 1986	July 20, 1987	Nouhoum Samassekou		Modibo Keïta	Ronald Reagan	
January 16, 1990	February 5, 1990	Mohamed Alhousseyni Toure		Modibo Keïta	George H. W. Bush	
January 7, 1992	April 14, 1993	Siragatou Ibrahim Cisse		Alpha Oumar Konaré	George H. W. Bush	
October 3, 1995	December 12, 1995	Cheick Oumar Diarrah		Alpha Oumar Konaré	Bill Clinton	
May 29, 2003	September 8, 2003	Abdoulaye Diop		Amadou Toumani Touré	George W. Bush	March 2012
March 23, 2010	March 29, 2010	Mamadou Traore		Amadou Toumani Touré	Barack Obama	March 2012
January 8, 2012	January 18, 2012	Al Maamoun Baba Lamine Keita		Amadou Toumani Touré	Barack Obama	March 2012
November 13, 2014	November 18, 2014	Tiena Coulibaly		Amadou Toumani Touré	Barack Obama	March 2012
