= Ahmed Mohamed ag Hamani =

Malian statesman and politician

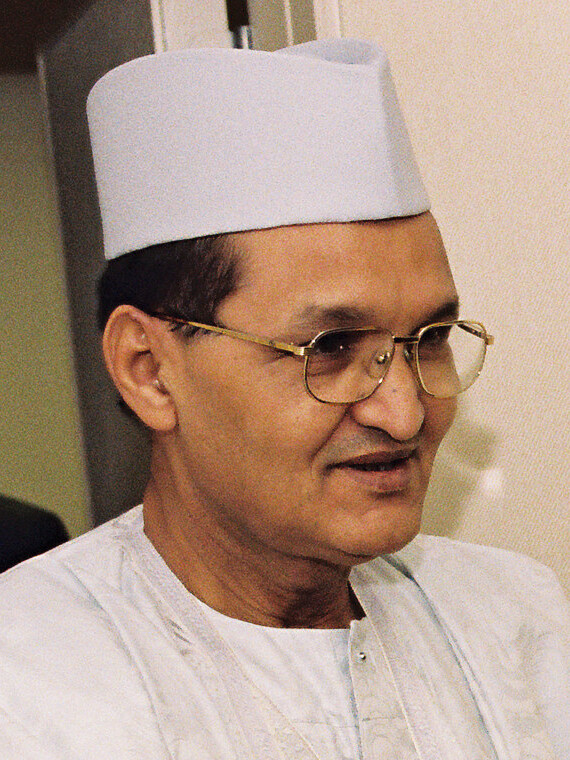

9th Prime Minister of Mali
- In office 9 June 2002 – 29 April 2004
- President: Amadou Toumani Touré
- Preceded by: Modibo Keita
- Succeeded by: Ousmane Issoufi Maïga
Ministerial offices
Minister of Transport and Public Works
In office 6 June 1986 – 20 January 1987
Minister of Sports, Arts and Culture
In office 31 December 1984 – 16 June 1986
President	Moussa Traoré
Minister of Planning
In office 2 August 1980 – 31 December 1984
President	Moussa Traoré
Minister of Information and Telecommunications
In office 28 June 1979 – 2 August 1980
President	Moussa Traoré
Minister for the Supervision of Companies and State Enterprises
In office 7 January 1978 – 28 June 1979
President	Moussa Traoré
Succeeded by

Personal details
- Born: 1942 Goundam, French Sudan (now Mali)
- Occupation: Politician

Ahmed Mohamed ag Hamani (born 1942) was the prime minister of Mali from 2002 to 2004.

== Life and career ==
Hamani was born in Goundam, and is an ethnic Tuareg. He became a technical advisor to the Minister of Planning in 1975 before entering the government on January 7, 1978, as Minister for the Supervision of Companies and State Enterprises. He then became Minister of Information and Telecommunications in the government named on June 28, 1979 and Minister of Planning in the government named on August 2, 1980; in the latter position, he became the second ranking person in the government after Moussa Traoré, who was President and Minister of Defense. He subsequently became Minister of Sports, Arts and Culture on December 31, 1984, and then Minister of Transport and Public Works on June 6, 1986. He left the government on January 20, 1987 and became High Commissioner of the Organization for the Development of the Senegal River, in which post he remained until 1992. In 1993, he was named Ambassador to Morocco by President Alpha Oumar Konaré; after six years in that post, he became Ambassador to Belgium, the Netherlands, the United Kingdom, Luxembourg, and the European Union.

He served there until he was named Prime Minister by Amadou Toumani Touré on June 9, 2002, after Touré took office following his victory in that year's presidential election, and his government was named on June 14. His initial appointment was regarded as being on a temporary basis extending through the period of the July 2002 parliamentary election. After the election, he was reappointed on October 12, 2002, with a new government being named on October 16. At Touré's request, he submitted his government's resignation on April 28, 2004, and Ousmane Issoufi Maïga was appointed Prime Minister on April 29.

Political offices
Preceded by Modibo Keita	Prime Minister of Mali; 2002–2004	Succeeded by Ousmane Issoufi Maïga
