= Moussa Mara =

Malian politician (born 1975)

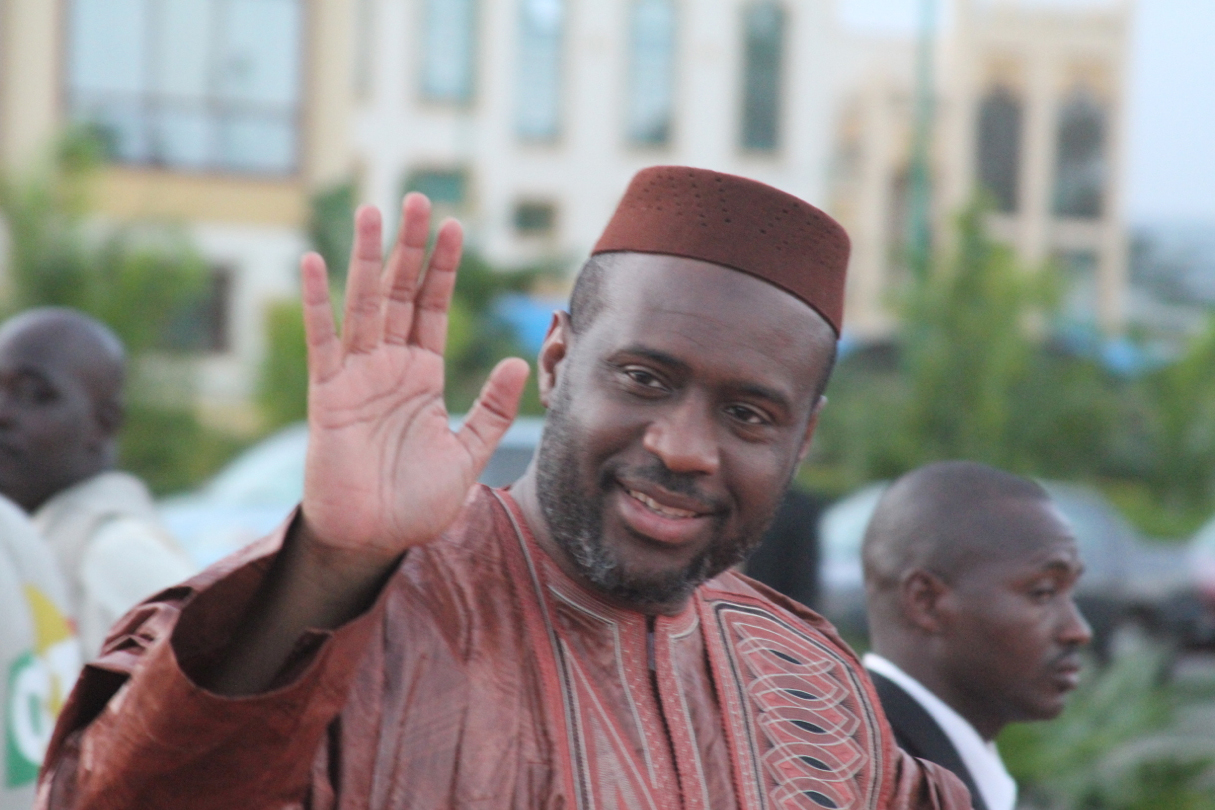

14th Prime Minister of Mali
- In office 5 April 2014 – 9 January 2015
- President: Ibrahim Boubacar Keïta
- Preceded by: Oumar Tatam Ly
- Succeeded by: Modibo Keita

Personal details
- Born: 2 March 1975 (age 51) Bamako, Mali
- Party: Change Party

Moussa Mara (born 2 March 1975) is a Malian politician who served as Prime Minister of Mali from 2014 to 2015. He previously served as Minister of Town Planning and was a candidate in the 2013 Malian presidential election.

Mara was appointed Prime Minister on 5 April 2014, following the resignation of his predecessor Oumar Tatam Ly. After less than a year in office, he resigned on 8 January 2015, and Modibo Keita was appointed to replace him.

On 16 July 2025, Mara was questioned by Mali's Judicial Investigation Brigade. On 1 August 2025, he was arrested on charges of "damaging the state's credibility" after expressing support on social media for imprisoned critics of the military junta.

On 27 October 2025, Mara was sentenced to two years in prison.

Political offices
Preceded by Oumar Tatam Ly	Prime Minister of Mali; 2014–2015	Succeeded by Modibo Keita
