= Abdoulaye Idrissa Maïga =

Malian politician (born 1958)

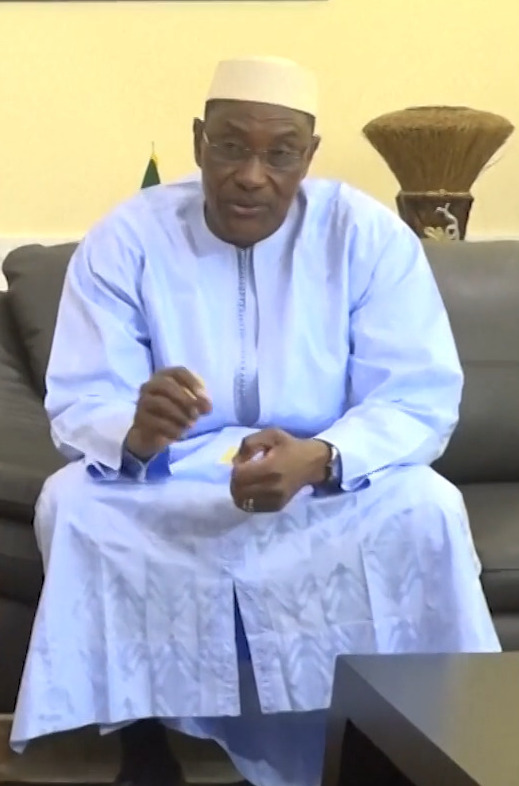

15th Prime Minister of Mali
- In office 10 April 2017 – 31 December 2017
- President: Ibrahim Boubacar Keïta
- Preceded by: Modibo Keita
- Succeeded by: Soumeylou Boubèye Maïga

Minister of Defence and Veteran Affairs
- In office 3 September 2016 – 10 April 2017
- Prime Minister: Modibo Keita
- Preceded by: Tiéman Hubert Coulibaly
- Succeeded by: Tiéna Coulibaly

Personal details
- Born: 11 March 1958 (age 68) Gao, French Sudan (now Mali)
- Party: Rally for Mali

Abdoulaye Idrissa Maïga (born 11 March 1958) is a Malian politician who was the Prime Minister of Mali from 8 April 2017 to 29 December 2017. Previously he was Minister of Defence since 3 September 2016. As Defence Minister he succeeded Tiéman Hubert Coulibaly, who resigned after the takeover of the village of Boni by jihadist forces. Maïga previously served as Minister of Territorial Administration and Minister for the Environment, Water and Sanitation. During the 2013 presidential election, he was campaign director of Ibrahim Boubacar Keïta, who was elected as president.

On 8 April 2017 President Keïta appointed him as prime minister. A new government headed by Maïga was appointed on 11 April 2017. In the new government, Tiéna Coulibaly succeeded Maïga as Minister of Defence. He surprisingly resigned his position on 29 December 2017 alongside his government.

Maïga was born in Gao. He is a member of the Rally for Mali.

Political offices
Preceded by Modibo Keita	Prime Minister of Mali; 2017	Succeeded by Soumeylou Boubèye Maïga
