= Modibo Keïta (born 1942) =

Malian politician (1942–2021)

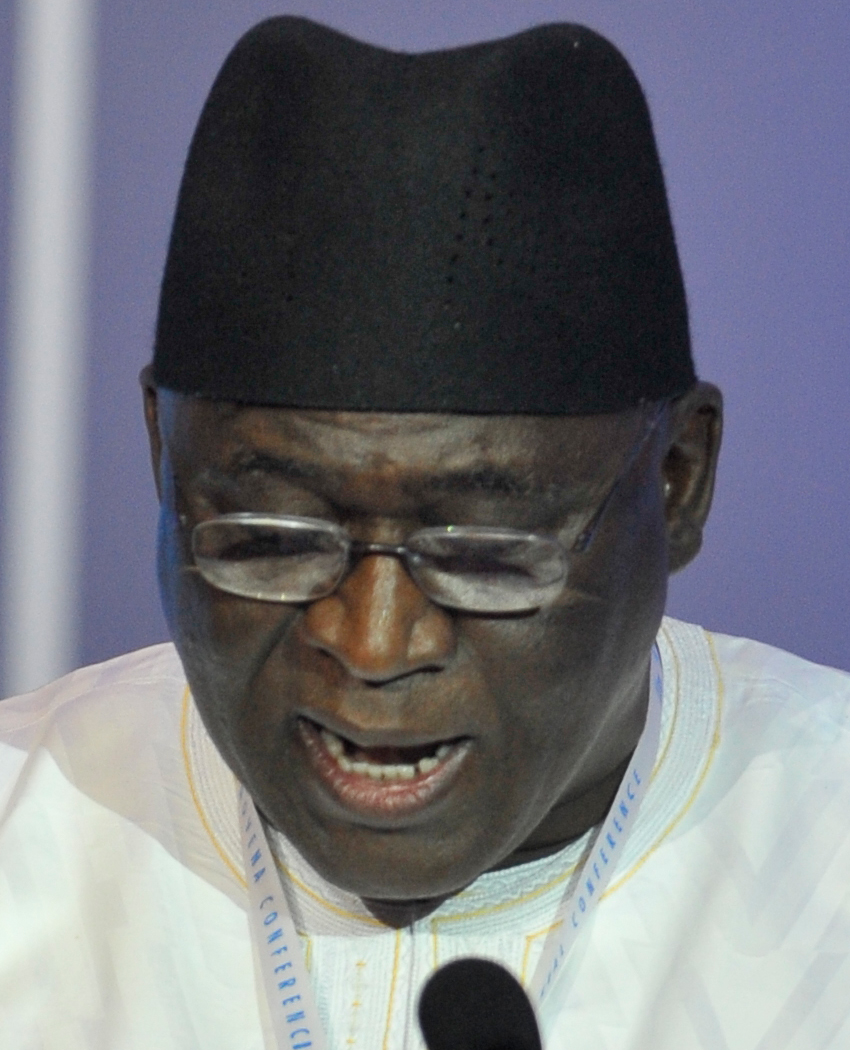

Prime Minister of Mali
- In office 9 January 2015 – 9 April 2017
- President: Ibrahim Boubacar Keïta
- Preceded by: Moussa Mara
- Succeeded by: Abdoulaye Idrissa Maïga
- In office 18 March 2002 – 9 June 2002
- President: Alpha Oumar Konaré
- Preceded by: Mandé Sidibé
- Succeeded by: Ahmed Mohamed ag Hamani

Personal details
- Born: 31 July 1942 Koulikoro, French Sudan (now Mali)
- Died: 2 January 2021 (aged 78)
- Party: Alliance for Democracy

Modibo Keïta (31 July 1942 – 2 January 2021) was a Malian politician who was Prime Minister of Mali from 18 March 2002 to 8 June 2002 and from 9 January 2015 to 9 April 2017.

== Biography ==
As Prime Minister for less than three months in 2002, he was the final prime minister appointed by President Alpha Oumar Konaré.

In April 2014, he was appointed President Ibrahim Boubacar Keïta's chief representative for negotiations with rebels. President Keïta subsequently appointed him to succeed Moussa Mara as Prime Minister on 8 January 2015. He was a relative of both President Keïta and founding father Modibo Keïta, his namesake, as a descendant of the Keita princes of the Empire of Mali. On 7 April 2017, he tendered his resignation as prime minister.

Keïta died on 2 January 2021, at the age of 78.

Political offices
Preceded by Mandé Sidibé	Prime Minister of Mali; 2002	Succeeded by Ahmed Mohamed ag Hamani
Preceded by Moussa Mara	Prime Minister of Mali; 2015–2017	Succeeded by Abdoulaye Idrissa Maïga
