= Abdoulaye Maiga (officer) =

Appointed interim prime minister of Mali

Lieutenant Colonel Abdoulaye Maiga
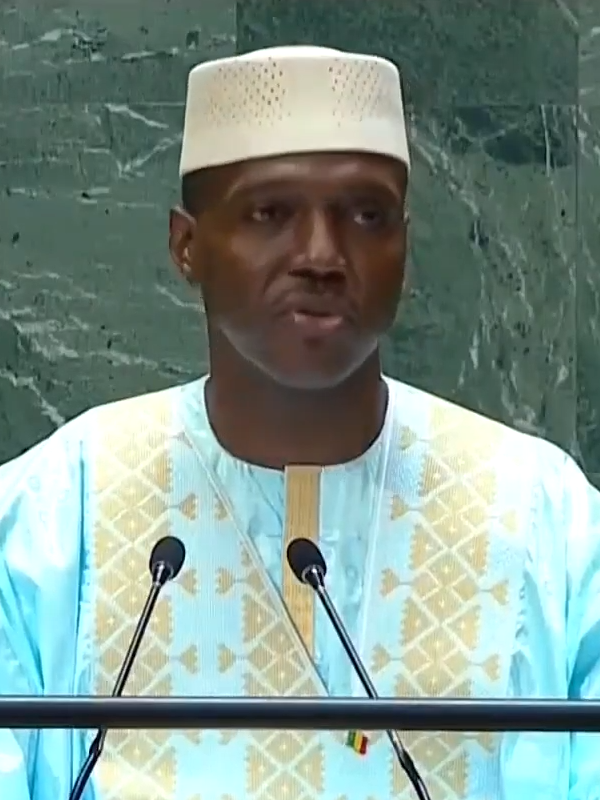
- Maiga in 2024, addressing the UNGA

Interim Prime Minister of Mali
- Incumbent
- Assumed office 21 November 2024
- President: Assimi Goita (interim from 28 May 2021 to 8 July 2025)
- Preceded by: Choguel Kokalla Maiga
- In office 21 August 2022 – 5 December 2022
- President: Assimi Goita (interim)
- Preceded by: Choguel Kokalla Maiga
- Succeeded by: Choguel Kokalla Maiga

Spokesperson for the Government
- In office 1 December 2021 – 20 November 2024
- Prime Minister: Choguel Kokalla Maiga; Himself
- Succeeded by: Issa Ousmane Coulibaly

Minister of Territorial Administration and Decentralisation
- Incumbent
- Assumed office June 2021
- Prime Minister: Choguel Kokalla Maiga; Himself

Minister of State of Mali
- In office 5 December 2022 – 20 November 2024

Personal details
- Born: 12 May 1981 (age 45) Bamako, Mali

Military service
- Allegiance: Mali
- Branch/service: Malian National Gendarmerie
- Rank: General
- Battles/wars: Mali War

Abdoulaye Maiga (born 12 May 1981) is a Malian military officer and politician who is serving as the interim prime minister of Mali since November 2024, previously serving in the position from August to December 2022.

Maiga is a lieutenant colonel in the Malian National Gendarmerie, which is a military force with law enforcement duties among the civilian population and is part of the Malian armed forces.

== Early life and education ==
Maiga studied diplomacy and international law in Algiers. He studied defence and international security policies in Paris and "holds a doctorate in International Security and Defense from Jean Moulin Lyon 3 University of the 'ED 492' Doctoral School of Law." He also studied human rights and humanitarian law at what is now Paris-Saclay University at Évry. Maiga started a doctorate in business law. He wrote a thesis on "the credibility of ECOWAS" to ensure peace and security.

Maiga has worked in the Early Warning Directorate on the Prevention of Terrorism in Economic Community of West African States (ECOWAS). He worked as a police officer for MONUSCO (part of the United Nations mission to the Democratic Republic of the Congo).

== Political career ==
Maiga was not part of the group of officers led by Colonel Assimi Goita who took power in the August 2020 Malian coup d'état. He is considered close to Goita, and became "the voice of the policy of breaking with France and its allies" after the second coup d'état in May 2021. In June 2021 he was appointed Minister of Territorial Administration and Decentralisation, and on 1 December 2021 was also appointed spokesperson for the government.

On 21 November 2024, Maiga was appointed by the junta as interim prime minister. Before his appointment Maiga served as Deputy Prime Minister of Mali.
