= List of countries with coalition governments =

A coalition government is a cabinet of a government in which several parties cooperate. The usual reason given for this arrangement is that no party on its own can achieve a majority in the parliament. A coalition government might also be created in a time of national difficulty or crisis, for example during wartime, to give a government the high degree of perceived political legitimacy it desires whilst also playing a role in diminishing internal political strife. In such times, parties have formed all-party coalitions (national unity governments, grand coalitions). If a coalition collapses, a confidence vote is held or a motion of no confidence is taken.

For the purposes of this list, coalitions can come in two forms. The first is produced by two or more parties joining forces after fighting elections separately to form a majority government. However, some coalitions (or alliances) are already decided before elections to give the parties the best chance of immediate government after the election.

== Europe ==
=== Countries ===
- Andorra: Democrats for Andorra, Committed Citizens.
- Armenia: Civil Contract, United Labour Party.
- Austria: Austrian People's Party, Social Democratic Party of Austria, NEOS (Austria).
- Belgium: New Flemish Alliance, Reformist Movement, Les Engages, Christian Democratic and Flemish, Vooruit.
- Bosnia and Herzegovina: Alliance of Independent Social Democrats, Social Democratic Party, Croatian Democratic Union of Bosnia and Herzegovina, People and Justice, Our Party.
- Croatia: Croatian Democratic Union, Homeland Movement.
- Czech Republic: ANO 2011, SPD, Motorists for Themselves.
- Denmark: Social Democrats, Green Left, Moderates, Danish Social Liberal Party
- Estonia: Estonian Reform Party, Estonia 200.
- Finland: National Coalition Party, Finns Party, Swedish People's Party, Christian Democratic Party.
- France: Ensemble Citoyens (Democratic Movement, En Commun, Horizons, Radical Party, Renaissance), The Republicans.
- Germany: Christian Democratic Union, Social Democratic Party.
- Iceland: Social Democratic Alliance, Viðreisn, People's Party.
- Italy: Brothers of Italy, Lega, Forza Italia, Us Moderates.
- Kosovo: Vetëvendosje, Guxo!, Progressive Democratic Party, Turkish Democratic Party of Kosovo, New Democratic Party, New Democratic Initiative, Vakat Coalition, Progressive Movement of Kosovar Roma, Social Democratic Union.
- Latvia: New Unity, Union of Greens and Farmers, United List, National Alliance.
- Liechtenstein: Patriotic Union, Progressive Citizens' Party.
- Lithuania: Social Democratic Party of Lithuania, Union of Democrats "For Lithuania", Lithuanian Farmers and Greens Union, Electoral Action of Poles in Lithuania - Christian Families Alliance
- Luxembourg: Christian Social People's Party, Democratic Party.
- Monaco: Monegasque National Union (Union for the Principality, National Union for the Future of Monaco, Promotion of the Monegasque Family).
- Montenegro: Europe Now!, For the Future of Montenegro (New Serb Democracy, Democratic People's Party), Democratic Montenegro, Bosniak Party, Socialist People's Party, Civis, Albanian Forum, Albanian Alliance.
- Netherlands: Democrats 66, Christian Democratic Appeal, People's Party for Freedom and Democracy.
- North Macedonia: Your Macedonia (VMRO-DPMNE, Socialist Party of Macedonia, Democratic Party of Serbs in Macedonia), VLEN Coalition (Alliance for Albanians (Taravari wing), Besa Movement, Democratic Movement, Alternative), For Our Macedonia.
- Poland: October 15 Coalition: Civic Coalition (Civic Platform, Modern, Polish Initiative, The Greens, AGROunion, Good Movement), Poland 2050, Polish Coalition (Polish People's Party, Centre for Poland, Agreement, Union of European Democrats), New Left.
- Portugal: Democratic Alliance (Social Democratic Party, CDS – People's Party).
- Ireland: Fianna Fáil, Fine Gael.
- Romania: PSD, PNL, UDMR, USR.
- Russia: United Russia, Liberal Democratic Party of Russia.
- San Marino: Sammarinese Christian Democratic Party, RETE Movement, Domani Motus Liberi, We for the Republic.
- Serbia: Serbian Progressive Party, Socialist Party of Serbia, Movement of Socialists, Party of United Pensioners of Serbia, Social Democratic Party of Serbia.
- Slovakia: Direction – Social Democracy, Voice – Social Democracy, Slovak National Party.
- Slovenia: Slovenian Democratic Party, Skupaj v Akcijo (New Slovenia, Slovenian People's Party, Focus of Marko Lotrič), Democrats.
- Spain: Spanish Socialist Workers' Party, Sumar.
- Sweden: Moderate Party, Christian Democrats, The Liberals.
- Switzerland: Social Democratic Party, Free Democratic Party, The Centre, Swiss People's Party.
- United Kingdom:
  - Northern Ireland: Sinn Féin, Democratic Unionist Party, Alliance Party of Northern Ireland, Ulster Unionist Party.

=== Dependencies ===
- Åland: Liberals for Åland, Åland Centre, Åland Social Democrats.
- Faroe Islands: People's Party, Union Party, Social Democratic Party.

== The Americas ==
=== Countries ===
- Argentina: La Libertad Avanza (Libertarian Party, Democratic Party), Republican Proposal, Radical Civic Union.
- Brazil: Brazil of Hope (Workers' Party, Communist Party of Brazil, Green Party), PSOL REDE Federation (Socialism and Liberty Party, Sustainability Network), Brazilian Socialist Party, Solidariedade, Avante, Agir,
- Colombia:Historic Pact for Colombia, Green Alliance, Commons, Independent Social Alliance, Indigenous Authorities of Colombia, Indigenous and Social Alternative Movement.
- Chile: Unidad por Chile (Democratic Socialism (Socialist Party, Party for Democracy, Radical Party, Liberal Party), Communist Party, Broad Front, Christian Democratic Party).
- Dominican Republic: Modern Revolutionary Party, Dominican Humanist Party, Alliance for Democracy, Revolutionary Social Democratic Party, Quisqueyano Christian Democratic Party, Social Democratic Institutional Bloc, Civic Renovation Party, Broad Front, Dominicans for Change
- Honduras: Liberty and Refoundation, Savior Party of Honduras, Christian Democratic Party of Honduras, Innovation and Unity Party.
- Mexico: MORENA, Ecologist Green Party, Labor Party.
- Panama: Democratic Change, Panameñista Party, Patriotic Union, Nationalist Republican Liberal Movement.
- Suriname: National Democratic Party, General Liberation and Development Party, National Party of Suriname, Pertjajah Luhur.

=== Dependencies ===
- Aruba: Aruban People's Party, FUTURO.
- Greenland: Democrats, Community of the People, Atassut.
- Sint Maarten: Unified Resilient St. Maarten Movement, Democratic Party Sint Maarten, Party for Progress, Soualiga Action Movement.

== Africa ==
- Algeria: National Liberation Front, National Rally for Democracy, Movement of Society for Peace.
- Democratic Republic of the Congo: Union of Mobutist Democrats, People's Party for Reconstruction and Democracy, Unified Lumumbist Party, Social Movement for Renewal, Coalition of Congolese Democrats, Federalist Christian Democracy-Convention of Federalists for Christian Democracy, Christian Democrat Party (Democratic Republic of the Congo), United Congolese Convention, National Alliance Party for Unity, Union for Federalist Nationalists of Congo, Alliance for the Renewal of Congo.
- Gabon: Gabonese Democratic Party, National Woodcutters' Rally – Rally for Gabon, Democratic and Republican Alliance, Circle of Reformist Liberals, Social Democratic Party, Rally of Republican Democrats, African Development Movement.
- Guinea-Bissau: African Independence Party of Guinea and Cape Verde, Party for Social Renewal.
- Kenya: Kenya Kwanza (United Democratic Alliance-led Alliance).
- Lesotho: All Basotho Convention, Alliance of Democrats, Basotho National Party, Reformed Congress of Lesotho.
- Mali: Alliance for Democracy in Mali, Union for the Republic and Democracy, Patriotic Movement for Renewal, National Congress for Democratic Initiative, Union for Democracy and Development, Movement for the Independence, Renaissance, and Integration of Africa, Party for Solidarity and Progress, Alternation Bloc for Renewal, Integration, and African Cooperation, Bloc for Democracy and African Integration, Citizens' Party for Revival, National Rally for Democracy, Sudanese Union-African Democratic Rally.
- Mauritania: Rally of Democratic Forces, Union of Forces of Progress, Independents.
- Mauritius: Militant Socialist Movement, Muvman Liberater, Rodrigues People's Organisation, Militant Platform.
- Morocco: National Rally of Independents, Authenticity and Modernity Party, Istiqlal Party.
- Rwanda; Rwandan Patriotic Front, Social Democratic Party, Liberal Party.
- South Africa: African National Congress, Democratic Alliance, Inkatha Freedom Party, Patriotic Alliance, Freedom Front Plus, United Democratic Movement, Al Jama-ah, Good, Pan Africanist Congress, Rise Mzansi.

== Asia ==
- China: Chinese Communist Party-led United Front
- Taiwan: Democratic Progressive Party-led Pan-Green coalition
- Cambodia: Cambodian People's Party, Funcinpec Party.
- India: Bharatiya Janata Party, Telugu Desam Party, Janata Dal (United), Lok Janshakti Party (Ram Vilas), Janata Dal (Secular), Nationalist Congress Party, Shiv Sena (2022-present), Apna Dal (Sonelal), National People's Party, Nationalist Democratic Progressive Party, Sikkim Krantikari Morcha, Hindustani Awam Morcha.
- Indonesia: Indonesian Democratic Party of Struggle (PDI-P), Golkar Party, Gerindra Party, NasDem Party, National Awakening Party (PKB), United Development Party (PPP), National Mandate Party (PAN), Democratic Party, Indonesian Solidarity Party (PSI), Perindo Party, Crescent Star Party (PBB).
- Iraq: Islamic Dawa Party, Patriotic Union of Kurdistan, Iraqi Islamic Party, Kurdistan Democratic Party, Supreme Islamic Iraqi Council, Islamic Dawa Party - Iraq Organisation, Sadrist Movement, Iraqi National Accord, National Democratic Party, Iraqi Communist Party, Islamic Action Organisation, Kurdistan Islamic Union, Independents.
- Israel: Likud, Shas, Otzma Yehudit, Religious Zionist Party, New Hope.
- Japan: Liberal Democratic Party, Japan Innovation Party.
- Kyrgyzstan: Ata-Jurt Kyrgyzstan, Mekenchil, Ishenim, Yntymak.
- Lebanon: Lebanese Forces, Kataeb, Tashnag, Progressive Socialist Party, Amal Movement, Hezbollah, Independents.
- Malaysia: Pakatan Harapan (People's Justice Party, Democratic Action Party, National Trust Party, United Progressive Kinabalu Organisation), Barisan Nasional (United Malays National Organisation, Malaysian Chinese Association, Malaysian Indian Congress, United Sabah People's Party), Gabungan Parti Sarawak (United Bumiputera Heritage Party, Sarawak United Peoples' Party, Sarawak People's Party, Progressive Democratic Party), Gabungan Rakyat Sabah (Sabah People's Ideas Party, Sabah United Party, Homeland Solidarity Party, Sabah Progressive Party, United Sabah National Organisation (New)), Heritage Party, Social Democratic Harmony Party, Parti Bangsa Malaysia and Independents.
- Mongolia: Mongolian People's Party, HUN Party, National Coalition.
- Pakistan: Pakistan Muslim League (Nawaz), Pakistan People's Party, Muttahida Qaumi Movement (Pakistan), Pakistan Muslim League (Quaid e Azam Group), Istehkam-e-Pakistan Party, Balochistan Awami Party, National Party, Pakistan Muslim League (Zia).
- Philippines: Partido Federal ng Pilipinas, Lakas–CMD, Nacionalista Party, Nationalist People's Coalition, National Unity Party, Laban ng Demokratikong Pilipino, Akbayan, Liberal Party, Katipunan ng Nagkakaisang Pilipino.
- Thailand: Bhumjaithai Party, Pheu Thai Party, Palang Pracharath Party, Prachachat Party, Economic Party, Thai Sang Thai Party, United Thai Nation Party, New Party, New Alternative Party, New Opportunity Party, New Democracy Party, Thai Progress Party.
- Timor-Leste: National Congress for Timorese Reconstruction, Democratic Party.

== Oceania ==
- New Zealand: National Party, ACT Party, NZ First.
- Papua New Guinea: National Alliance Party, People's Action Party, People's National Congress Party, People's Democratic Movement, United Resources Party, Pangu Party, United Party (Papua New Guinea), Melanesian Alliance Party.
- Solomon Islands: Reform Democratic Party, Democratic Party, Ownership, Unity and Responsibility Party, Rural and Urban Political Party, People's Congress Party, Rural Development Party, People's Federation Party, Independent Democratic Party, Independents.
- Tonga: Democratic Party of the Friendly Islands, People's Democratic Party, Independents.
- Vanuatu: Union of Moderate Parties, Labour Party, Our Land Party, Republican Party, National United Party, Namangi Aute, Family First Party.
