= April 1997 Malian parliamentary election =

Parliamentary elections were held in Mali on 13 April 1997. However, the results were invalidated by the Constitutional Court due to "serious irregularities". According to the Electoral Law, fresh elections had to be held within three months, and were ultimately held in July and August.

== Results ==
| Party | Votes | % |
|---|---|---|
| Alliance for Democracy in Mali | 687,156 | 42.50 |
| Sudanese Union – African Democratic Rally | 126,271 | 7.81 |
| Patriotic Movement for Renewal | 109,500 | 6.77 |
| Party for National Rebirth | 99,065 | 6.13 |
| Bloc for Democracy and African Integration | 84,801 | 5.24 |
| National Congress for Democratic Initiative | 78,631 | 4.86 |
| Party for Democracy and Progress | 46,469 | 2.87 |
| Union for Democracy and Development | 46,306 | 2.86 |
| Rally for Democracy and Progress | 37,384 | 2.31 |
| Movement for the Independence, Renaissance, and Integration of Africa | 27,824 | 1.72 |
| Rally for Labour Democracy | 25,912 | 1.60 |
| Social Democratic Convention | 22,975 | 1.42 |
| Malian Party for Development and Renewal | 21,772 | 1.35 |
| Sudanese Progressive Party | 19,848 | 1.23 |
| Union of Democratic Forces for Progress | 16,353 | 1.01 |
| Convention for Progress and the People | 14,891 | 0.92 |
| Party for Unity, Democracy, and Progress | 14,061 | 0.87 |
| RFP | 12,435 | 0.77 |
| Ecologist Party for Integration | 9,863 | 0.61 |
| Citizens Movement–Circle of Republican Democrats | 9,474 | 0.59 |
| Union of Democratic Forces | 7,647 | 0.47 |
| African Party for Renewal and Integration | 7,618 | 0.47 |
| Malian Rally for Labour | 6,223 | 0.38 |
| Malian Union for Democracy and Development | 5,014 | 0.31 |
| FDJ | 3,139 | 0.19 |
| Party for Unity and Progress in Mali | 2,151 | 0.13 |
| Alliance for Economic and Social Development | 1,594 | 0.10 |
| Rally for Justice and Progress | 810 | 0.05 |
| Malian Party for Social Progress | 692 | 0.04 |
| CCP | 382 | 0.02 |
| FN | 287 | 0.02 |
| Party of Democratic Renewal and Labour | 275 | 0.02 |
| Movement for Democracy and Development | 257 | 0.02 |
| Alliances | 34,144 | 2.11 |
| Independents | 35,793 | 2.21 |
| Total | 1,617,017 | 100.00 |
| Valid votes | 1,613,003 | 95.60 |
| Invalid/blank votes | 74,188 | 4.40 |
| Total votes | 1,687,191 | 100.00 |
| Registered voters/turnout | 5,035,938 | 33.50 |
Source: N'Diaye (Note: There is a difference of 4,014 between the total number of votes received by each party and the total number of valid votes.)
