= 1951 French legislative election in French Sudan =

Elections to the French National Assembly were held in French Sudan on 17 June 1951 as part of the wider French parliamentary elections. Four members were elected, with the Sudanese Progressive Party winning three (taken by Fily Dabo Sissoko, Jean Silvandre and Hamadoun Dicko) and the Sudanese Union – African Democratic Rally one (Mamadou Konaté).

== Results ==
Party	Votes	%	Seats	+/–
Sudanese Progressive Party	201,866	59.73	3	+1
Sudanese Union – African Democratic Rally	115,490	34.17	1	0
Rally of the French People	20,403	6.04	0	New
Others	230	0.07	0	–
Total	337,989	100.00	4	+1
Valid votes	337,989	99.35		
Invalid/blank votes	2,218	0.65		
Total votes	340,207	100.00		
Registered voters/turnout	910,944	37.35		
Source: Sternberger et al.
