= 1992 Malian parliamentary election =

Parliamentary elections were held in Mali on 23 February 1992 and 8 March 1992, the first after the March 1991 military coup that overthrew President Moussa Traoré. Following the coup, the Comité Transitoire de Salut du Peuple (CTSP) was created to manage the democratic transition. This body established a transitional government headed by Amadou Toumani Touré, the leader of the military group responsible for overthrowing Traoré. The transitional government oversaw a constitutional referendum and municipal elections in January 1992, the parliamentary elections in February and March, and the April 1992 presidential elections.

In the parliamentary elections, voters elected 129 members of the National Assembly. The result was a victory for the Alliance for Democracy in Mali (ADEMA-PASJ), which won 76 of the 129 seats. Voter turnout was just 21% in the first round. ADEMA-PASJ leader Alpha Oumar Konaré went on to win the presidential elections the following month.

== Background ==
Throughout Moussa Traoré's presidency, which had begun in 1968, the army regularly used force to maintain their power. However, his government failed to eliminate opposition in the trade union and educational communities. During the 1970s there were several significant student uprisings, the most prominent of which, the third congress of the Union Nationale des Etudiants et des Elèves du Mali, led to the assassination of Abdoul Karim Camara. However, the government maintained strong control throughout the 1980s and largely prevented opposition movements from organising. In 1990, as Traoré's government faced humiliating defeats to Tuareg rebels in northern Mali, opposition groups increased their pressure against the military dictatorship. That year, several pro-democracy groups such as the Youth for Democracy and Progress, the National Congress for Democratic Initiative and the Alliance for Democracy in Mali (ADEMA) were formed and began holding protests and demonstrations.

By 1991, the pro-democracy movement was on the rise, spearheaded by student-led peaceful protests. In January the National Workers' Union of Mali (UNTM) declared a general nationwide strike. In March, in response to the building pressure from the protest movements and the Tuareg insurgencies, Traoré's government violently subdued the opposition; on 22 March the military opened fire on a peaceful student demonstration in Bamako, killing hundreds and causing five days of rioting as hundreds of thousands of people took to the streets.

On 26 March, a military squadron led by Lt. Col. Amadou Toumani Touré arrested Traoré, ending his presidency. Touré, in response to continued pro-democracy protests following the coup, brought together civilian and military leaders to form the Comité Transitoire de Salut du Peuple (CTSP) to manage the transition from authoritarianism. This group consisted of ten representatives from the armed and security forces, fifteen representatives from the Comité de Coordination des Associations et des Organisations Démocratiques (CCAOD), which gave spaces to youth movement leaders and members of the armed resistance against Traoré. Following a period of negotiations, the CTSP created a transitional government led by Touré with the aim of preparing the country for democratic elections in the following year.

A National Conference took place between 29 July and 12 August 1991, which determined procedures for the planned elections and an electoral calendar, as well as deliberating a new constitution. Around 2,000 people participated in the conference's discussions on education, healthcare, judicial and electoral reforms. Due to its importance to Malian political tradition, dialogue was a particular focus of this conference. The subsequent electoral calendar resulting in six separate votes taking place during 1992; a constitutional referendum on 12 January, municipal elections on 19 January for municipal elections, parliamentary elections on 23 February and 8 March and presidential elections on 12 and 26 April. The elections were organized by a secretariat created by the CTSP in August 1991 and a commission guaranteeing fair access to state media facilitated candidates in delivering their platforms on television and radio broadcasts.

== Campaign ==
At the time of the 1992 legislative elections, there were 48 official political parties, multiparty politics having been legalised by Ordinance 2 of the Comité Transitoire de Salut du Peuple. However, only 22 participating in the elections.

ADEMA-PASJ was the dominant party in this election. First formed in 1990 as one of the first democratic political associations that publicly opposed the Traoré regime, they marketed themselves as a centre-left party with socialist tendencies. Members had strong ties with former President Modibo Keïta, who had made the country a one-party socialist state in 1960. During the elections, the face of the party was their presidential candidate Alpha Oumar Konaré, a former professor of history and pro-democracy advocate. Critical to his appeal was his "man of the people" charisma and his role on the front lines of the pro-democracy protest. The party's success was due in large part to Konaré's united base of educators, students, and medical professionals.

The National Congress for Democratic Initiative (CNID) had a base of young, urban political activists who had been prominent during the protests that led to the downfall of the Traoré government. However, unlike their compatriots from ADEMA-PASJ, CNID members were largely educated abroad and were not part of the group of dissidents imprisoned by Traoré. The party's support was concentrated mostly in Ségou Region.

== Conduct ==
The elections were overseen by around forty foreign observers who issued a joint declaration that the Malian elections were fair and transparent. Malian journalists were concerned with the exorbitant costs of the election process that forced Mali to rely heavily on foreign financial aid.

== Results ==
| Party | Votes | % | Seats |
|---|---|---|---|
| Alliance for Democracy in Mali | 476,254 | 48.42 | 76 |
| Sudanese Union – African Democratic Rally | 172,998 | 17.59 | 8 |
| National Congress for Democratic Initiative | 54,623 | 5.55 | 9 |
| Party for Democracy and Progress | 50,335 | 5.12 | 2 |
| Rally for Democracy and Progress | 43,658 | 4.44 | 4 |
| Union for Democracy and Development | 43,313 | 4.40 | 4 |
| Rally for Labour Democracy | 36,946 | 3.76 | 3 |
| Popular Movement for the Development of the Republic of West Africa | 26,676 | 2.71 | 6 |
| Sudanese Progressive Party | 16,901 | 1.72 | 0 |
| Union of Democratic Forces for Progress | 15,888 | 1.62 | 3 |
| Malian Union for Democracy and Development | 4,252 | 0.43 | 1 |
| Ten other parties | 41,787 | 4.25 | 0 |
| Seats elected by overseas voters | | | 13 |
| Total | 983,631 | 100.00 | 129 |
| Valid votes | 983,631 | 96.72 | |
| Invalid/blank votes | 33,388 | 3.28 | |
| Total votes | 1,017,019 | 100.00 | |
| Registered voters/turnout | 4,780,416 | 21.27 | |
Source: Nohlen et al.

== Aftermath ==
The country received praise for its successful democratic transition. Due to its relatively early transition compared to others in the region, Mali was seen by many as the model for democracy in Africa. However, voter participation was extremely weak, with voter turnout at just 21% in the first round. While voting was difficult for those in the north due to the Tuareg insurgencies, voter disaffection was clear and several groups boycotted the election. This pattern sustained itself as subsequent elections also saw low turnouts and several boycotts. Voters were concerned about the corruption of public officials, and the 1992 parliamentary elections did little to remedy these feelings. Accusations of voting fraud and illegal financing persisted throughout the election cycle. Tiéloulé Konaté of US-RDA accused Konaré and ADEMA-PASJ of buying votes, giving preference to voting stations in districts where they had strong support, and increasing identification requirements for Malian voters in Ivory Coast. This combined, with displeasure over the foreign financing of the elections led to a boycott of the 1997 elections which saw ADEMA maintain power largely unopposed.
