= 1956 French legislative election in French Sudan =

Elections to the French National Assembly were held in French Sudan on 2 January 1956 as part of the wider French parliamentary elections. Four members were elected, with the Sudanese Progressive Party (PSS) and the Sudanese Union – African Democratic Rally (US–RDA) winning two each. Mamadou Konaté and Modibo Keïta were elected on the US–RDA list, whilst Fily Dabo Sissoko and Hamadoun Dicko were elected for the PSS.

== Results ==
Party	Votes	%	Seats	+/–
Sudanese Union – African Democratic Rally	215,419	49.75	2	+1
Sudanese Progressive Party	161,911	37.39	2	−1
Dogon Union	29,506	6.81	0	New
Socialist Movement for the Defence of Sudanese Interests	15,248	3.52	0	New
Independent Progressive Action	10,946	2.53	0	New
Total	433,030	100.00	4	0
Valid votes	433,030	98.75		
Invalid/blank votes	5,472	1.25		
Total votes	438,502	100.00		
Registered voters/turnout	1,075,645	40.77		
Source: Sternberger et al.
