= November 1946 French legislative election in French Sudan =

Elections to the French National Assembly were held in French Sudan on 10 November 1946 as part of the wider French parliamentary elections. Three members were elected, with the Sudanese Progressive Party winning two seats (taken by Fily Dabo Sissoko and Jean Silvandre) and the Sudanese Union – African Democratic Rally one (Mamadou Konaté).

== Results ==
Party	Votes	%	Seats
Sudanese Progressive Party	60,759	64.09	2
Sudanese Union – African Democratic Rally	27,653	29.17	1
Union of Mossi Samoghos	5,169	5.45	0
Popular Republican Movement	1,222	1.29	0
Total	94,803	100.00	3
Valid votes	94,803	99.54	
Invalid/blank votes	440	0.46	
Total votes	95,243	100.00	
Registered voters/turnout	160,464	59.35	
Source: Sternberger et al.
