= June 1946 French legislative election in French Sudan–Niger =

Election in French Sudan–Niger on 2 June 1946

Elections to the French National Assembly were held in the constituency of French Sudan−Niger on 2 June 1946 as part of the wider parliamentary elections. Two members were elected from two separate electoral colleges. A second round of voting was held in the first colleges on 16 June as no candidate received over 50% of the vote in the first round.

== Results ==
=== First College ===
Candidate	Party	First round		Second round	
Candidate	Party	Votes	%	Votes	%
Jean Silvandre	French Section of the Workers' International	992	47.95	1,128	48.60
Robert Lattes	Popular Republican Movement	693	33.49	1,193	51.40
Louis Delmas		317	15.32		
Charles Graziani		54	2.61		
François Ettori		13	0.63		
Total		2,069	100.00	2,321	100.00
Valid votes		2,069	96.32	2,321	98.43
Invalid/blank votes		79	3.68	37	1.57
Total votes		2,148	100.00	2,358	100.00
Registered voters/turnout		3,484	61.65	3,661	64.41
Source: De Benoist

=== Second College ===
Candidate	Votes	%
Fily Dabo Sissoko	17,032	67.43
Mamadou Konaté	4,307	17.05
Roland Gougis	3,919	15.52
Total	25,258	100.00
Valid votes	25,258	99.05
Invalid/blank votes	242	0.95
Total votes	25,500	100.00
Registered voters/turnout	36,714	69.46
Source: National Assembly
