= 1945 French legislative election in French Sudan–Niger =

Elections to the French National Assembly were held in the constituency of French Sudan−Niger on 21 October 1945 as part of the wider French elections. Two members were elected from two separate electoral colleges. A second round of voting was held for both colleges on 18 November as no candidate received over 50% of the vote in the first round. Maurice Kaouza and Fily Dabo Sissoko were elected.

== Campaign ==
An attempt to form a unified African bloc for the elections failed due to the number of people seeking to be candidates. Fily Dabo Sissoko became a well-known a writer, and was popular with chiefs, particularly those from animist groups. He campaigned on a platform of equal pay for Africans and Europeans, the abolishment of forced labour and the emancipation of women.

In the second round of the second college elections, opponents of Sissoko have their backing to Mamadou Konaté, a teacher who was well-respected amongst the local intelligentsia.

== Results ==
=== First College ===
Candidate	Party	First round		Second round	
Candidate	Party	Votes	%	Votes	%
Maurice Kaouza	Democratic and Socialist Union of the Resistance	660	26.63	1,375	58.11
Jean Silvandre	French Section of the Workers' International	632	25.50	912	38.55
Pierre-André Gomis		417	16.83		
Trollé		317	12.79		
Robert Lattes	Popular Republican Movement	205	8.27		
André Marie		122	4.92		
Raoul Monmarson		109	4.40	79	3.34
Pasquini		16	0.65		
Total		2,478	100.00	2,366	100.00
Valid votes		2,478	96.12	2,366	98.71
Invalid/blank votes		100	3.88	31	1.29
Total votes		2,578	100.00	2,397	100.00
Registered voters/turnout		3,243	79.49	3,263	73.46
Source: De Benoist, National Assembly

=== Second College ===
Candidate	First round		Second round	
Candidate	Votes	%	Votes	%
Fily Dabo Sissoko	10,406	38.77	11,277	45.81
Henri Montchamp	4,462	16.62	3,672	14.92
Roland Gougis	3,753	13.98	3,759	15.27
Mamadou Konaté	2,905	10.82	5,242	21.30
Sall Ibrahima	1,433	5.34		
Balobo Maiga	961	3.58	666	2.71
Modibo Keita	937	3.49		
Hamani Diori	564	2.10		
Diarra Trémoko Dratigui	503	1.87		
Sidibé Tidiani	448	1.67		
Sidibé Mamby	271	1.01		
Mariko Siriman	200	0.75		
Total	26,843	100.00	24,616	100.00
Valid votes	26,843	99.37	24,616	99.56
Invalid/blank votes	171	0.63	108	0.44
Total votes	27,014	100.00	24,724	100.00
Registered voters/turnout	33,626	80.34	33,643	73.49
Source: Sternberger et al., De Benoist

== Aftermath ==
Following the elections, Senegalese MP Lamine Guèye attempted to persuade all the African MPs to form an African Bloc, which would be affiliated with the SFIO. However, the attempt failed, and Sissoko joined the MUR.
