= 1997 Malian presidential election =

- 11 May 1997
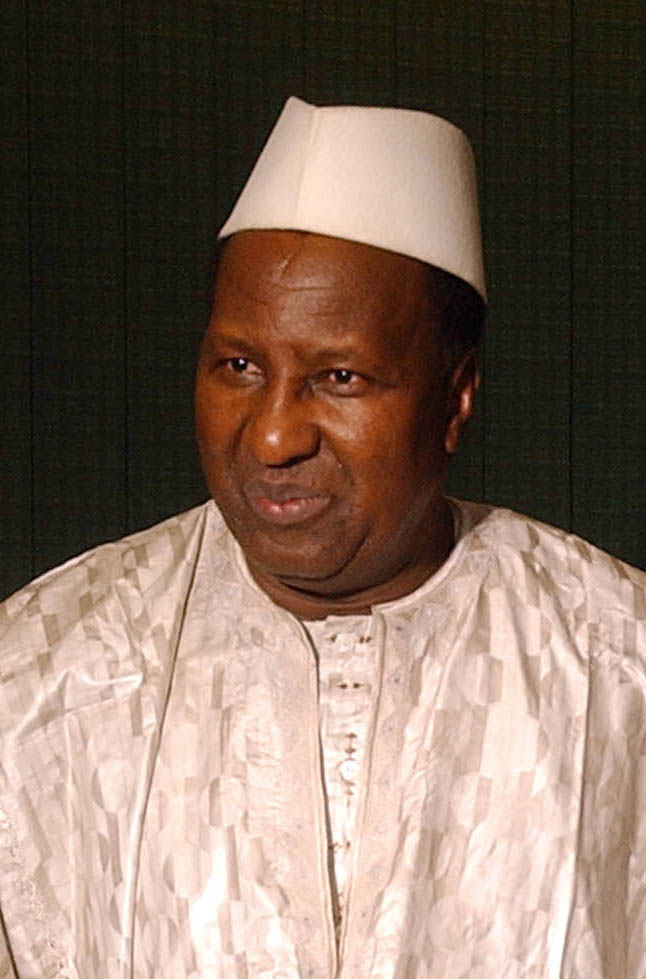

Nominee	Alpha Oumar Konaré	Mamadou Diaby
Party	ADEMA-PASJ	PUDP
Popular vote	1,395,581	59,001
Percentage	84.9%	3.6%
President before election
Alpha Oumar Konaré
ADEMA-PASJ
President-elect
Alpha Oumar Konaré
ADEMA-PASJ

Presidential elections were held in Mali on 11 May 1997. They were boycotted by the main opposition parties and saw incumbent president Alpha Oumar Konaré of the Alliance for Democracy in Mali re-elected with 84.4% of the vote, although turnout was just 29%.

== Results ==
Candidate	Party	Votes	%
Alpha Oumar Konaré	Alliance for Democracy in Mali	1,395,581	84.94
Mamadou Diaby	Party for Unity, Democracy and Progress	59,001	3.59
Mountaga Tall	National Congress for Democratic Initiative	30,195	1.84
Soumana Sacko	Convention for Progress and the People	30,060	1.83
Choguel Kokalla Maïga	Patriotic Movement for Renewal	29,259	1.78
Seydou Kouyate	Sudanese Union – African Democratic Rally	26,565	1.62
Abdoul Berthe	Malian Party for Development and Renewal	21,860	1.33
Idrissa Traoré	Party for Democracy and Progress	19,437	1.18
Almamy Sylla	Rally for Democracy and Progress	16,115	0.98
Mamadou Traoré	MIRIA	15,030	0.91
Total		1,643,103	100.00
Valid votes		1,643,103	97.74
Invalid/blank votes		38,054	2.26
Total votes		1,681,157	100.00
Registered voters/turnout		5,830,824	28.83
Source: Nohlen et al.
