= Mountaga Tall (politician) =

Malian politician

Mountaga Tall (born December 10, 1956) is a Malian politician who is President of the National Congress for Democratic Initiative (CNID) and served in the government of Mali as Minister of Higher Education and Scientific Research from 2014 to 2016 and Minister of the Digital Economy and Communication from 2016 to 2017. Previously he was First Vice-President of the National Assembly of Mali from 2002 to 2007.

== Political career ==
Tall was born in Ségou. A lawyer by profession, he founded CNID and ran as the party's candidate in the 1992 presidential election, when he placed third with 11.41% of the votes, after Alpha Oumar Konaré (ADEMA-PASJ) and Tiéoulé Konaté (US-RDA). He served as a Deputy in the National Assembly from 1992 to 1997.

The CNID, along with other opposition parties, boycotted the presidential election held on May 11, 1997. On May 12, Tall said that Konaré, who had been re-elected, was not legitimately President; Tall's office was attacked with molotov cocktails and badly damaged on the same day. Tall and CNID participated in a boycott of the July 1997 parliamentary election. He was one of many opposition leaders who were arrested on August 9, 1997, in connection with the killing of a police officer at a rally on August 8; they were charged on August 14.

At a CNID party congress held in Bamako in early March 2002, Tall was nominated without opposition as the party's candidate for the April 2002 presidential election. He won 3.86% of the votes in the first round of the presidential election and took fifth place. In the July 2002 parliamentary election, Tall was part of a candidate list of the Espoir 2002 coalition, which included CNID, in Ségou constituency, and he was elected. Following this election, he became the First Vice-President of the National Assembly, remaining in that post through the five-year parliamentary term (2002–2007).

When the Pan-African Parliament began meeting in March 2004, Tall became one of Mali's five members.

Tall was again elected to a seat in the National Assembly in the July 2007 parliamentary election, running at the head of an ADEMA-CNID-URD list in Ségou. Although the list did not win a majority in its district in the first round, in the second round it won 63.89%. At the beginning of the new National Assembly's term on September 3, Tall was a candidate for the position of President of the National Assembly, but he was defeated by ADEMA President Dioncounda Traoré; Tall received 31 votes while Traoré received 111.

In addition to serving in the National Assembly, Tall was also a member of the Parliament of the Economic Community of West African States.

In the November–December 2013 parliamentary election, Tall sought re-election to the National Assembly as a candidate in Ségou but was defeated in the second round of voting.

Under President Ibrahim Boubacar Keïta, Tall was appointed to the government as Minister of Higher Education and Scientific Research on 11 April 2014. He was moved to the post of Minister of the Digital Economy and Communication, as well as Government Spokesman, on 7 July 2016. He was dismissed from the government on 11 April 2017.

On the night of 2 May 2026, Tall was abducted by armed men who stormed his home in Bamako. According to a relative who spoke with the Associated Press, the kidnappers were from the Malian Armed Forces. On 16 May, Tall's eldest son, Cheick Mamadou Tall, went missing after allegedly receiving a phone call asking him to bring personal items to his father. As of November 2026, Tall and his son still missing.
