= Rally for Labour Democracy =

The Rally for Labour Democracy (French: Rassemblement pour la Démocratie du Travail, RDT) is a political party in Mali.

== History ==
The party grew out of an association formed by former residents of Mopti living in Bamako who were opposed to authoritarian president Moussa Traoré. It was formally established in 1991.

Following the 1991 coup that overthrew Traoré, the RDT contested the parliamentary elections in February and March 1992, receiving 4% of the vote and winning three seats. The party nominated party leader Amadou Niangadou as its candidate for the presidential elections that April; Niangadou finished seventh in a field of nine candidates with 4% of the vote. Following the elections the party received one ministerial post. In the municipal elections held the same year the party won eleven seats.

The party saw its vote share reduced to 2% in the annulled April 1997 parliamentary elections and subsequently boycotted the July 1997 parliamentary elections. Prior to the 2002 parliamentary elections the party joined the Hope 2002 coalition, and won one of the alliance's 66 seats in the National Assembly. In the 2004 municipal elections the party won 17 seats.

The RDT lost its parliamentary representation in the 2007 parliamentary elections, and failed to win a seat in the 2013 parliamentary elections.
