= Coalition government =

Governmental style in which political parties cooperate to form a government

A coalition government, or coalition cabinet, is a government by two or more political parties that enter into a power-sharing arrangement of the executive. Coalition governments usually occur when no single party has achieved an absolute majority after an election. A party not having majority is common under proportional representation, but not in nations with majoritarian electoral systems.

There are different forms of coalition governments, minority coalitions and surplus majority coalition governments. A surplus majority coalition government controls more than the absolute majority of seats in parliament necessary to have a majority in the government, whereas minority coalition governments do not hold the majority of legislative seats.

A coalition government may also be created in a time of national difficulty or crisis (for example, during wartime or economic crisis) to give a government the high degree of perceived political legitimacy or collective identity, it can also play a role in diminishing internal political strife. In such times, parties have formed all-party coalitions (national unity governments, grand coalitions).

If a coalition collapses, the prime minister and cabinet may be ousted by a vote of no confidence, call snap elections, form a new majority coalition, or continue as a minority government.

== Formation of coalition governments ==
For a coalition to come about the coalition partners need to compromise on their policy expectations. One coalition or probing partner must lose for the other one to win, to achieve a Nash equilibrium, which is necessary for a coalition to form. If the parties are not willing to compromise, the coalition will not come about.

Before parties form a coalition government, they formulate a coalition agreement, in which they state what policies they try to adapt in the legislative period.

== Coalition agreement ==
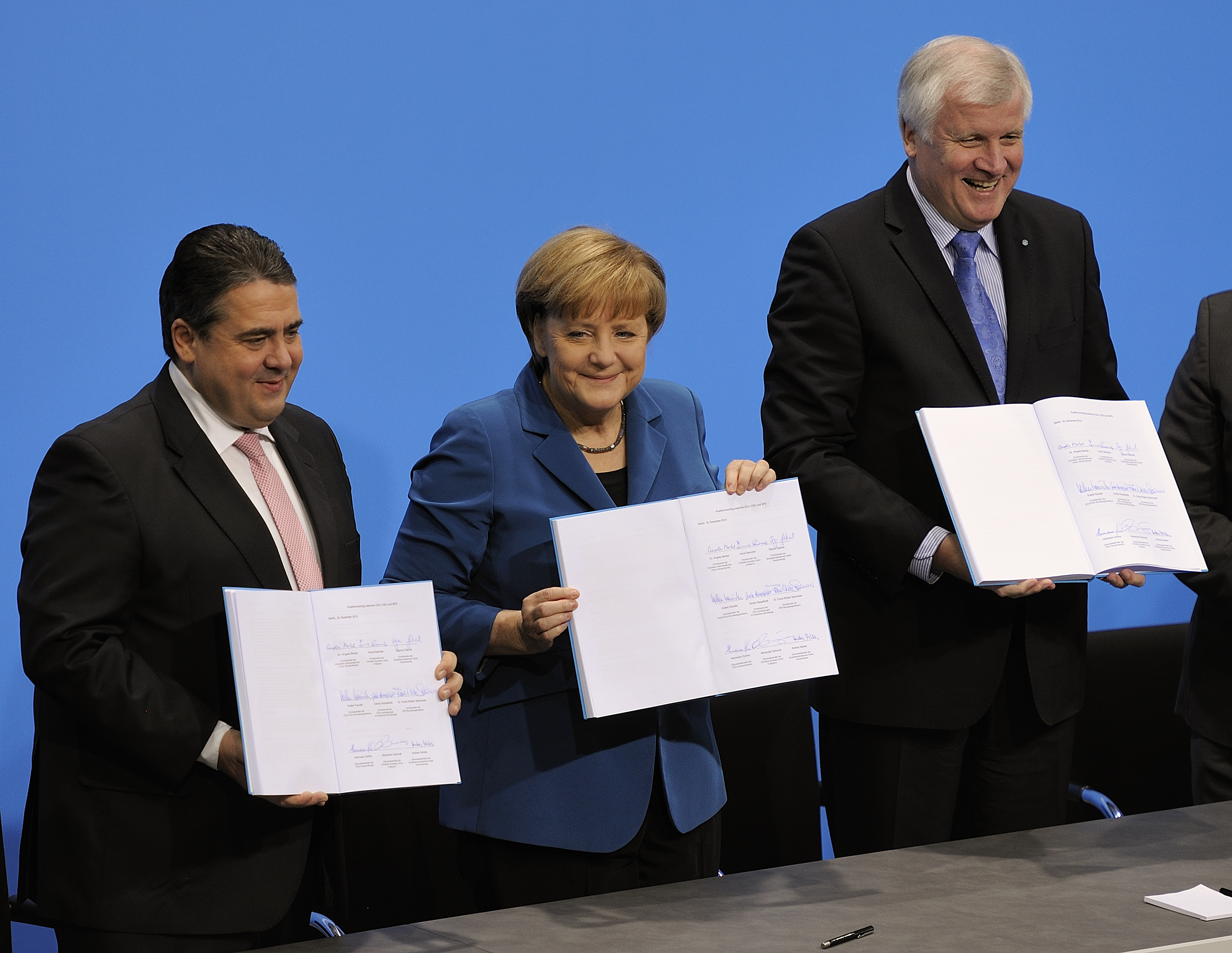
Sigmar Gabriel (SPD), Angela Merkel (CDU) and Horst Seehofer (CSU) presenting the 2013 coalition agreement for Germany's third Merkel cabinet

In multi-party states, a coalition agreement is an agreement negotiated between the parties that form a coalition government. It codifies the most important shared goals and objectives of the cabinet. It is often written by the leaders of the parliamentary groups. Coalitions that have a written agreement are more productive than those that do not.

If an issue is discussed more deeply and in more detail in chamber than what appears in the coalition agreement, it indicates that the coalition parties do not share the same policy ideas. Hence, a more detailed written formulation of the issue helps parties in the coalition to limit 'agency loss' when the ministry overseeing that issue is managed by another coalition party.

== Electoral accountability ==
Coalition governments can also impact voting behavior by diminishing the clarity of responsibility.

Electoral accountability is harder to achieve in coalition governments than in single party governments because there is no direct responsibility within the governing parties in the coalition.

Retrospective voting has a huge influence on the outcome of an election. However, the risk of retrospective voting is a lot weaker with coalition governments than in single party governments. Within the coalition, the party with the head of state has the biggest risk of retrospective voting.

== Governing cost ==
Governing parties lose votes in the election after their legislative period, this is called "the governing cost". In comparison, a single- party government has a higher electoral cost, than a party that holds the office of the prime minister. Furthermore, the party that holds the office of prime minister suffer less electoral costs, then a junior coalition partner, when looking only on the electoral cost created by being in the coalition government.

== Distribution ==
Countries which often operate with coalition cabinets include: the Nordic countries, the Benelux countries, Australia, Austria, Brazil, Chile, Cyprus, East Timor, France, Germany, Greece, Guinea-Bissau, India, Indonesia, Ireland, Israel, Italy, Japan, Kenya, Kosovo, Latvia, Lebanon, Lesotho, Liechtenstein, Lithuania, Malaysia, Nepal, New Zealand, Pakistan, Thailand, Spain, Trinidad and Tobago, Turkey, and Ukraine. Switzerland has been ruled by a consensus government with a coalition of the four strongest parties in parliament since 1959, called the "Magic Formula". Between 2010 and 2015, the United Kingdom also operated a formal coalition between the Conservative and the Liberal Democrat parties, but this was unusual: the UK usually has a single-party majority government. Not every parliament forms a coalition government, for example the European Parliament.

=== Armenia ===
Armenia became an independent state in 1991, following the collapse of the Soviet Union. Since then, many political parties were formed in it, who mainly work with each other to form coalition governments. The country was governed by the My Step Alliance coalition after successfully gaining a majority in the National Assembly of Armenia following the 2018 Armenian parliamentary election.

=== Australia ===
In federal Australian politics, the conservative Liberal, National, Country Liberal and Liberal National parties are united in a coalition, known simply as the Coalition.

While nominally two parties, the Coalition has become so stable, at least at the federal level, that in practice the lower house of Parliament has become a two-party system, with the Coalition and the Labor Party being the major parties. This coalition is also found in the states of New South Wales and Victoria. In South Australia and Western Australia the Liberal and National parties compete separately, while in the Northern Territory and Queensland the two parties have merged, forming the Country Liberal Party, in 1978, and the Liberal National Party, in 2008, respectively.

Coalition governments involving the Labor Party and the Australian Greens have occurred at state and territory level, for example following the 2010 Tasmanian state election and the 2016 and 2020 Australian Capital Territory elections.

=== Belgium ===
In Belgium, a nation internally divided along linguistic lines (primarily between Dutch-speaking Flanders in the north and French-speaking Wallonia in the south, with Brussels also being by and large Francophone), each main political disposition (Social democracy, liberalism, right-wing populism, etc.) is, with the exception of the far-left Workers' Party of Belgium, split between Francophone and Dutch-speaking parties (e.g. the Dutch-speaking Vooruit and French-speaking Socialist Party being the two social-democratic parties). In the 2019 federal election, no party got more than 17% of the vote. Thus, forming a coalition government is an expected and necessary part of Belgian politics. In Belgium, coalition governments containing ministers from six or more parties are not uncommon; consequently, government formation can take an exceptionally long time. Between 2007 and 2011, Belgium operated under a caretaker government as no coalition could be formed.

=== Canada ===
In Canada, the Great Coalition was formed in 1864 by the Clear Grits, Parti bleu, and Liberal-Conservative Party. During the First World War, Prime Minister Robert Borden attempted to form a coalition with the opposition Liberals to broaden support for controversial conscription legislation. The Liberal Party refused the offer but some of their members did cross the floor and join the government. Although sometimes referred to as a coalition government, according to the definition above, it was not. It was disbanded after the end of the war.

During the 2008–09 Canadian parliamentary dispute, two of Canada's opposition parties signed an agreement to form what would become the country's second federal coalition government since Canadian Confederation if the minority Conservative government was defeated on a vote of non-confidence, unseating Stephen Harper as prime minister. The agreement outlined a formal coalition consisting of two opposition parties, the Liberal Party and the New Democratic Party. The Bloc Québécois agreed to support the proposed coalition on confidence matters for 18 months. In the end, parliament was prorogued by the Governor General, and the coalition dispersed before parliament was reconvened.

According to historian Christopher Moore, coalition governments in Canada became much less possible in 1919, when the leaders of parties were no longer chosen by elected MPs but instead began to be chosen by party members. Such a manner of leadership election had never been tried in any parliamentary system before. According to Moore, as long as that kind of leadership selection process remains in place and concentrates power in the hands of the leader, as opposed to backbenchers, then coalition governments will be very difficult to form. Moore shows that the diffusion of power within a party tends to also lead to a diffusion of power in the parliament in which that party operates, thereby making coalitions more likely.

==== Provincial ====
Several coalition governments have been formed within provincial politics. As a result of the 1919 Ontario election, the United Farmers of Ontario and the Labour Party, together with three independent MLAs, formed a coalition that governed Ontario until 1923.

In British Columbia, the governing Liberals formed a coalition with the opposition Conservatives in order to prevent the surging, left-wing Cooperative Commonwealth Federation from taking power in the 1941 British Columbia general election. Liberal premier Duff Pattullo refused to form a coalition with the third-place Conservatives, so his party removed him. The Liberal–Conservative coalition introduced a winner-take-all preferential voting system (the "Alternative Vote") in the hopes that their supporters would rank the other party as their second preference; however, this strategy backfired in the subsequent 1952 British Columbia general election where, to the surprise of many, the right-wing populist BC Social Credit Party won a minority. They were able to win a majority in the subsequent election as Liberal and Conservative supporters shifted their anti-CCF vote to Social Credit.

Manitoba has had more formal coalition governments than any other province. Following gains by the United Farmer's/Progressive movement elsewhere in the country, the United Farmers of Manitoba unexpectedly won the 1921 election. Like their counterparts in Ontario, they had not expected to win and did not have a leader. They asked John Bracken, a professor in animal husbandry, to become leader and premier. Bracken changed the party's name to the Progressive Party of Manitoba. During the Great Depression, Bracken survived at a time when other premiers were being defeated by forming a coalition government with the Manitoba Liberals (eventually, the two parties would merge into the Liberal-Progressive Party of Manitoba, and decades later, the party would change its name to the Manitoba Liberal Party). In 1940, Bracken formed a wartime coalition government with almost every party in the Manitoba Legislature (the Conservatives, CCF, and Social Credit; however, the CCF broke with the coalition after a few years over policy differences). The only party not included was the small, communist Labor-Progressive Party, which had a handful of seats.

In Saskatchewan, NDP premier Roy Romanow formed a formal coalition with the Saskatchewan Liberals in 1999 after being reduced to a minority. After two years, the newly elected Liberal leader David Karwacki ordered the coalition be disbanded, the Liberal caucus disagreed with him and left the Liberals to run as New Democrats in the upcoming election. The Saskatchewan NDP was re-elected with a majority under its new leader Lorne Calvert, while the Saskatchewan Liberals lost their remaining seats and have not been competitive in the province since.

=== Denmark ===
From the creation of the Folketing in 1849 through the introduction of proportional representation in 1918, there were only single-party governments in Denmark. In 1929, the country's first coalition government was formed when Thorvald Stauning's Social Democrats and the Social Liberal Party formed the Stauning II Cabinet. Since then, the norm has been coalition governments, though there have been periods where single-party governments were frequent, such as the decade after the end of World War II, during the 1970s, and in the late 2010s. Every government from 1982 until the 2015 elections were coalitions. Mette Frederiksen's third government, in power since 2026, is a coalition of the Social Democrats, Green Left, Moderates, and Social Liberal Party.

When the Social Democrats under Stauning won 46% of the votes in the 1935 election, this was the closest any party has gotten to winning an outright majority in parliament since 1918. One party has thus never held a majority alone, and even one-party governments have needed to have confidence agreements with at least one other party to govern. For example, though Frederiksen's first government only consisted of the Social Democrats, it also relied on the support of the Social Liberal Party, the Green Left, and the Red–Green Alliance.

=== Finland ===
In Finland, no party has had an absolute majority in the parliament since independence, and multi-party coalitions have been the norm. Finland experienced its most stable government (Lipponen I and II) since independence with a five-party governing coalition, a so-called "rainbow government". The Lipponen cabinets set the stability record and were unusual in the respect that both the centre-left (SDP) and radical left-wing (Left Alliance) parties sat in the government with the major centre-right party (National Coalition). The Katainen cabinet was also a rainbow coalition of a total of five parties.

=== Germany ===
In Germany, coalition governments are the norm, as it is rare for any single party to win a majority in parliament. The German political system makes extensive use of the constructive vote of no confidence, which requires governments to control an absolute majority of seats. Every government since the foundation of the Federal Republic in 1949 has involved at least two political parties. Typically, governments involve one of the two major parties forming a coalition with a smaller party. For example, from 1982 to 1998, the country was governed by a coalition of the CDU/CSU with the minor Free Democratic Party (FDP); from 1998 to 2005, a coalition of the Social Democratic Party of Germany (SPD) and the minor Greens held power. The CDU/CSU comprises an alliance of the Christian Democratic Union of Germany and Christian Social Union in Bavaria, described as "sister parties" which form a joint parliamentary group, and for this purpose are always considered a single party. Coalition arrangements are often given names based on the colours of the parties involved, such as "red-green" for the SPD and Greens. Coalitions of three parties are often named after countries whose flags contain those colours, such as the black-yellow-green Jamaica coalition.

Grand coalitions of the two major parties also occur, but these are relatively rare, as they typically prefer to associate with smaller ones. However, if the major parties are unable to assemble a majority, a grand coalition may be the only practical option. This was the case following the 2005 federal election, in which the incumbent SPD–Green government was defeated but the opposition CDU/CSU–FDP coalition also fell short of a majority. A grand coalition government was subsequently formed between the CDU/CSU and the SPD. Partnerships like these typically involve carefully structured cabinets: Angela Merkel of the CDU/CSU became Chancellor while the SPD was granted the majority of cabinet posts.

Coalition formation has become increasingly complex as voters increasingly migrate away from the major parties during the 2000s and 2010s. While coalitions of more than two parties were extremely rare in preceding decades, they have become common on the state level. These often include the liberal FDP and the Greens alongside one of the major parties, or "red–red–green" coalitions of the SPD, Greens, and The Left. In the eastern states, dwindling support for moderate parties has seen the rise of new forms of grand coalitions such as the Kenya coalition. The rise of populist parties also increases the time that it takes for a successful coalition to form. By 2016, the Greens were participating eleven governing coalitions on the state level in seven different constellations. During campaigns, parties often declare which coalitions or partners they prefer or reject. This tendency toward fragmentation also spread to the federal level, particularly during the 2021 federal election, which saw the CDU/CSU and SPD fall short of a combined majority of votes for the first time in history.

=== India ===
After India's Independence on 15 August 1947, the Indian National Congress, the major political party instrumental in the Indian independence movement, ruled the nation. The first Prime Minister, Jawaharlal Nehru, his successor Lal Bahadur Shastri, and the third Prime Minister, Indira Gandhi, were all members of the Congress party. However, Raj Narain, who had unsuccessfully contested an election against Indira from the constituency of Rae Bareli in 1971, lodged a case alleging electoral malpractice. In June 1975, Indira was found guilty and barred by the High Court from holding public office for six years. In response, a state of emergency was declared under the pretext of national security. The next election resulted in the formation of India's first ever national coalition government under the prime ministership of Morarji Desai, which was also the first non-Congress national government. It existed from 24 March 1977 to 15 July 1979, headed by the Janata Party, an amalgam of political parties opposed to the emergency imposed between 1975 and 1977. As the popularity of the Janata Party dwindled, Desai had to resign, and Chaudhary Charan Singh, a rival of his, became the fifth Prime Minister. However, due to lack of support, this coalition government did not complete its five-year term.

Congress returned to power in 1980 under Indira Gandhi, and later under Rajiv Gandhi as the sixth prime minister. However, the general election of 1989 once again brought a coalition government under National Front, which lasted until 1991, with two prime ministers, the second one being supported by Congress. The 1991 election resulted in a Congress-led stable minority government for five years. The eleventh parliament produced three prime ministers in two years and forced the country back to the polls in 1998. The first successful coalition government in India which completed a whole five-year term was the Bharatiya Janata Party (BJP)-led National Democratic Alliance with Atal Bihari Vajpayee as prime minister from 1999 to 2004. Then another coalition, the Congress-led United Progressive Alliance, consisting of 13 separate parties, ruled India for two terms from 2004 to 2014 with Manmohan Singh as PM. However, in the 16th general election in May 2014, the BJP secured a majority on its own (becoming the first party to do so since the 1984 election), and the National Democratic Alliance came into power, with Narendra Modi as prime minister. In 2019, Narendra Modi was re-elected as prime minister as the National Democratic Alliance again secured a majority in the 17th general election. India returned to an NDA led coalition government in 2024 as the BJP failed to achieve an outright majority.

=== Indonesia ===
As a result of the toppling of Suharto, political freedom was significantly increased. Compared to only three parties allowed to exist in the New Order era, a total of 48 political parties participated in the 1999 election and always a total of more than 10 parties in next elections. There are no majority winner of those elections and coalition governments are inevitable. The current government is a coalition of five parliamentary parties led by the major centre-right Gerindra to let governing big tent Advanced Indonesia Coalition.

=== Ireland ===
In Ireland, coalition governments are common; not since 1977 has a single party formed a majority government. Coalition governments to date have been led by either Fianna Fáil or Fine Gael. They have been joined in government by one or more smaller parties or independent members of parliament (TDs).

Ireland's first coalition government was formed after the 1948 general election, with five parties and independents represented at cabinet. Before 1989, Fianna Fáil had opposed participation in coalition governments, preferring single-party minority government instead. It formed a coalition government with the Progressive Democrats in that year.

The Labour Party has been in government on eight occasions. On all but one of those occasions, it was as a junior coalition party to Fine Gael. The exception was a government with Fianna Fáil from 1993 to 1994. The 29th Government of Ireland (2011–16), was a grand coalition of the two largest parties, as Fianna Fáil had fallen to third place in the Dáil.

The current government is a Fianna Fáil, Fine Gael and the Independents. Although Fianna Fáil and Fine Gael have been serving in government together since 2020, they haven't formed coalition before due to their different roots that goes back to Irish Civil War (1922–23).

=== Israel ===
A similar situation exists in Israel, which typically has at least 10 parties holding representation in the Knesset. The only faction to ever gain a majority of Knesset seats was Alignment, an alliance of the Labour Party and Mapam that held an absolute majority briefly from 1968 to 1969. Historically, control of the Israeli government has alternated between periods of right-wing Likud rule in coalition with several right-wing and religious parties and periods of centre-left Labour rule in coalition with several left-wing parties. Ariel Sharon's formation of the centrist Kadima party in 2006 drew support from former Labour and Likud members, and Kadima ruled in coalition with several other parties.

Israel also formed a national unity government from 1984–1988. The premiership and foreign ministry portfolio were held by the head of each party for two years, and they switched roles in 1986.

=== Japan ===
In Japan, controlling a majority in the House of Representatives is enough to decide the election of the prime minister (=recorded, two-round votes in both houses of the National Diet, yet the vote of the House of Representatives decision eventually overrides a dissenting House of Councillors vote automatically after the mandatory conference committee procedure fails which, by precedent, it does without real attempt to reconcile the different votes). Therefore, a party that controls the lower house can form a government on its own. It can also pass a budget on its own. But passing any law (including important budget-related laws) requires either majorities in both houses of the legislature or, with the drawback of longer legislative proceedings, a two-thirds majority in the House of Representatives.

In recent decades, single-party full legislative control is rare, and coalition governments are the norm: Most governments of Japan since the 1990s and, as of 2020, all since 1999 have been coalition governments, some of them still fell short of a legislative majority. The Liberal Democratic Party (LDP) held a legislative majority of its own in the National Diet until 1989 (when it initially continued to govern alone), and between the 2016 and 2019 elections (when it remained in its previous ruling coalition). The Democratic Party of Japan (through accessions in the House of Councillors) briefly controlled a single-party legislative majority for a few weeks before it lost the 2010 election (it, too, continued to govern as part of its previous ruling coalition).

From the constitutional establishment of parliamentary cabinets and the introduction of the new, now directly elected upper house of parliament in 1947 until the formation of the LDP and the reunification of the Japan Socialist Party in 1955, no single party formally controlled a legislative majority on its own. Only few formal coalition governments (46th, 47th, initially 49th cabinet) interchanged with technical minority governments and cabinets without technical control of the House of Councillors (later called "twisted Diets", nejire kokkai, when they were not only technically, but actually divided). But during most of that period, the centrist Ryokufūkai was the strongest overall or decisive cross-bench group in the House of Councillors, and it was willing to cooperate with both centre-left and centre-right governments even when it was not formally part of the cabinet; and in the House of Representatives, minority governments of Liberals or Democrats (or their precursors; loose, indirect successors to the two major pre-war parties) could usually count on support from some members of the other major conservative party or from smaller conservative parties and independents. Finally in 1955, when Hatoyama Ichirō's Democratic Party minority government called early House of Representatives elections and, while gaining seats substantially, remained in the minority, the Liberal Party refused to cooperate until negotiations on a long-debated "conservative merger" of the two parties were agreed upon, and eventually successful.

After it was founded in 1955, the Liberal Democratic Party dominated Japan's governments for a long period: The new party governed alone without interruption until 1983, again from 1986 to 1993 and most recently between 1996 and 1999. The first time the LDP entered a coalition government followed its third loss of its House of Representatives majority in the 1983 House of Representatives general election. The LDP-New Liberal Club coalition government lasted until 1986 when the LDP won landslide victories in simultaneous double elections to both houses of parliament.

There have been coalition cabinets where the post of prime minister was given to a junior coalition partner: the JSP-DP-Cooperativist coalition government in 1948 of prime minister Ashida Hitoshi (DP) who took over after his JSP predecessor Tetsu Katayama had been toppled by the left wing of his own party, the JSP-Renewal-Kōmei-DSP-JNP-Sakigake-SDF-DRP coalition in 1993 with Morihiro Hosokawa (JNP) as compromise PM for the Ichirō Ozawa-negotiated rainbow coalition that removed the LDP from power for the first time to break up in less than a year, and the LDP-JSP-Sakigake government that was formed in 1994 when the LDP had agreed, if under internal turmoil and with some defections, to bury the main post-war partisan rivalry and support the election of JSP prime minister Tomiichi Murayama in exchange for the return to government.

=== Malaysia ===
Ever since Malaysia gained independence in 1957, none of its federal governments have ever been controlled by a single political party. Due to the social nature of the country, the first federal government was formed by a three-party Alliance coalition, composed of the United Malays National Organisations (UMNO), the Malaysian Chinese Association (MCA), and the Malaysian Indian Congress (MIC). It was later expanded and rebranded as Barisan Nasional (BN), which includes parties representing the Malaysian states of Sabah and Sarawak.

The 2018 Malaysian general election saw the first non-BN coalition federal government in the country's electoral history, formed through an alliance between the Pakatan Harapan (PH) coalition and the Sabah Heritage Party (WARISAN). The federal government formed after the 2020–2022 Malaysian political crisis was the first to be established through coordination between multiple political coalitions. This occurred when the newly formed Perikatan Nasional (PN) coalition partnered with BN and Gabungan Parti Sarawak (GPS). In 2022 after its registration, Sabah-based Gabungan Rakyat Sabah (GRS) formally joined the government (though it had been a part of an informal coalition since 2020). The current government led by Prime Minister Anwar Ibrahim is composed of four political coalitions and 19 parties.

=== New Zealand ===
MMP was introduced in New Zealand in the 1996 election. In order to get into power, parties need to get a total of 50% of the approximately (there can be more if an Overhang seat exists) 120 seats in parliament – 61. Since it is rare for a party to win a full majority, they must form coalitions with other parties. For example, from 1996 to 1998, the country was governed by a coalition of the National with the minor NZ First; from 1999 to 2002, a coalition of the Labour and the minor Alliance and with confidence and supply from the Green Party held power. Between 2017 and 2020, Labour, New Zealand First formed a Coalition Government with confidence and supply from the Green Party. During the 2023 general election, National, ACT and New Zealand First formed a coalition government following three weeks of negotiations.

=== Spain ===
Since 2015, there are many more coalition governments than previously in municipalities, autonomous regions and, since 2020 (coming from the November 2019 Spanish general election), in the Spanish Government. There are two ways of conforming them: all of them based on a program and its institutional architecture, one consists on distributing the different areas of government between the parties conforming the coalition and the other one is, like in the Valencian Community, where the ministries are structured with members of all the political parties being represented, so that conflicts that may occur are regarding competences and not fights between parties.

Coalition governments in Spain had already existed during the 2nd Republic, and have been common in some specific Autonomous Communities since the 1980s. Nonetheless, the prevalence of two big parties overall has been eroded and the need for coalitions appears to be the new normal since around 2015.

=== Turkey ===
Turkey's first coalition government was formed after the 1961 general election, with two political parties and independents represented at cabinet. It was also Turkey's first grand coalition as the two largest political parties of opposing political ideologies (Republican People's Party and Justice Party) united. Between 1960 and 2002, 17 coalition governments were formed in Turkey. The media and the general public view coalition governments as unfavorable and unstable due to their lack of effectiveness and short lifespan. Following Turkey's transition to a presidential system in 2017, political parties focussed more on forming electoral alliances. Due to separation of powers, the government doesn't have to be formed by parliamentarians and therefore not obliged to result in a coalition government. However, the parliament can dissolve the cabinet if the parliamentary opposition is in majority.

=== United Kingdom ===
In the United Kingdom, coalition governments (sometimes known as "national governments") usually have only been formed at times of national crisis. The most prominent was the National Government of 1931 to 1940. There were multi-party coalitions during both world wars. Apart from this, when no party has had a majority, minority governments normally have been formed with one or more opposition parties agreeing to vote in favour of the legislation which governments need to function: for instance the Labour government of James Callaghan formed a pact with the Liberals from March 1977 until July 1978, following a series of by-election defeats which had eroded Labour's majority of three seats which had been gained at the October 1974 election. However, in the run-up to the 1997 general election, Labour opposition leader Tony Blair was in talks with Liberal Democrat leader Paddy Ashdown about forming a coalition government if Labour failed to win a majority at the election; but there proved to be no need for a coalition as Labour won the election by a landslide. The 2010 general election resulted in a hung parliament (Britain's first for 36 years), and the Conservatives, led by David Cameron, which had won the largest number of seats, formed a coalition with the Liberal Democrats in order to gain a parliamentary majority, ending 13 years of Labour government. This was the first time that the Conservatives and Lib Dems had made a power-sharing deal at Westminster. It was also the first full coalition in Britain since 1945, having been formed 70 years virtually to the day after the establishment of Winston Churchill's wartime coalition, Labour and the Liberal Democrats have entered into a coalition twice in the Scottish Parliament, as well as twice in the Welsh Assembly.

=== Uruguay ===
Since the 1989 election, there have been 4 coalition governments, all including at least both the conservative National Party and the liberal Colorado Party. The first one was after the election of the blanco Luis Alberto Lacalle and lasted until 1992 due to policy disagreements, the longest lasting coalition was the Colorado-led coalition under the second government of Julio María Sanguinetti, in which the national leader Alberto Volonté was frequently described as a "Prime Minister", the next coalition (under president Jorge Batlle) was also Colorado-led, but it lasted only until after the 2002 Uruguay banking crisis, when the blancos abandoned the government. Following the 2019 Uruguayan general election, the blanco Luis Lacalle Pou formed the coalición multicolor, composed of his own National Party, the liberal Colorado Party, the eclectic Open Cabildo and the center left Independent Party.

== Support and criticism ==
Advocates of proportional representation suggest that a coalition government leads to more consensus-based politics, as a government comprising differing parties (often based on different ideologies) need to compromise about governmental policy. Another stated advantage is that a coalition government better reflects the popular opinion of the electorate within a country; this means, for instance, that the political system contains just one majority-based mechanism. Contrast this with district voting in which the majority mechanism occurs twice: first, the majority of voters pick the representative and, second, the body of representatives make a subsequent majority decision. The doubled majority decision undermines voter support for that decision. The benefit of proportional representation is that it contains that majority mechanism just once. Additionally, coalition partnership may play an important role in moderating the level of affective polarization over parties, that is, the animosity and hostility against the opponent party identifiers/supporters.

Those who disapprove of coalition governments believe that such governments have a tendency to be fractious and prone to disharmony, as their component parties hold differing beliefs and thus may not always agree on policy. Sometimes the results of an election mean that the coalitions which are mathematically most probable are ideologically infeasible, for example in Flanders or Northern Ireland. A second difficulty might be the ability of minor parties to play "kingmaker" and, particularly in close elections, gain far more power in exchange for their support than the size of their vote would otherwise justify.

Coalition governments also obfuscate the choices faced by voters. The coalitions formed after elections are at least somewhat unpredictable and may not reflect the preferences and priorities of the voters. The coalition government between the Tories and the Lib Dems formed in 2010 was widely seen as a betrayal by Lib Dem voters who would have preferred a coalition with Labour.

Germany is the largest nation ever to have had proportional representation during the interbellum. After WW II, the German system, district based but then proportionally adjusted afterward, contains a threshold that keeps the number of parties limited. The threshold is set at five percent, resulting in empowered parties with at least a minimum amount of political gravity.

Coalition governments have also been criticized for sustaining a consensus on issues when disagreement and the consequent discussion would be more fruitful. To forge a consensus, the leaders of ruling coalition parties can agree to silence their disagreements on an issue to unify the coalition against the opposition. The coalition partners, if they control the parliamentary majority, can collude to make the parliamentary discussion on the issue irrelevant by consistently disregarding the arguments of the opposition and voting against the opposition's proposals — even if there is disagreement within the ruling parties about the issue. However, in winner-take-all this seems always to be the case.

Powerful parties can also act in an oligocratic way to form an alliance to stifle the growth of emerging parties. Of course, such an event is rare in coalition governments when compared to two-party systems, which typically exist because of stifling of the growth of emerging parties, often through discriminatory nomination rules regulations and plurality voting systems, and so on.

A single, more powerful party can shape the policies of the coalition disproportionately. Smaller or less powerful parties can be intimidated to not openly disagree. In order to maintain the coalition, they would have to vote against their own party's platform in the parliament. If they do not, the party has to leave the government and loses executive power. However, this is contradicted by the "kingmaker" factor mentioned above.

Finally, a strength that can also be seen as a weakness is that proportional representation puts the emphasis on collaboration. All parties involved are looking at the other parties in the best light possible, since they may be (future) coalition partners. The pendulum may therefore show less of a swing between political extremes. Still, facing external issues may then also be approached from a collaborative perspective, even when the outside force is not benevolent. Research shows coalition governments are similar in representation of initial voter preferences in policies to pluralities systems, but often less able to remain reflective of those preferences as time passes due to the number of conflicting stakeholders.

== Legislative coalitions and agreements ==
A legislative coalition or voting coalition is when political parties in a legislature align on voting to push forward specific policies or legislation, but do not engage in power-sharing of the executive branch like in coalition governments.

In a parliamentary system, political parties may form a confidence and supply arrangement, pledging to support the governing party on legislative bills and motions that carry a vote of confidence. Unlike a coalition government, which is a more formalised partnership characterised by the sharing of the executive branch, a confidence and supply arrangement does not entail executive "power-sharing". Instead, it involves the governing party supporting specific proposals and priorities of the other parties in the arrangement, in return for their continued support on motions of confidence.

=== United States ===
In the United States, political parties have formed legislative coalitions in the past in order to push forward specific policies or legislation in the United States Congress. In 1855, a coalition was formed between members of the American Party, Opposition Party and Republican Party to elect Nathaniel P. Banks speaker of the House.

Later, in 1917, at the start of the 65th Congress, a coalition was formed between members of the Democratic Party, Progressive Party and Socialist Party of America to elect Champ Clark as the speaker of the United States House of Representatives. This was the only time a socialist party entered coalition government in the House on a national level. More recently, during the 118th Congress, an informal legislative coalition formed between Democrats and mainline Republicans to pass critical legislation opposed by the Freedom Caucus, a right-wing faction controlling a minority of seats in the Republican Conference.

A coalition government, in which "power-sharing" of executive offices is performed, has not occurred in the United States. The norms that allow coalition governments to form and persist do not exist in the United States.

== See also ==
- Cohabitation
- Collaborative leadership
- Electoral alliance
- Electoral fusion
- Hung parliament
- List of democracy and election-related topics
- List of countries with coalition governments
- Majority government
- Minority government
- Parliamentary system
- Plurality voting system
- Political coalition
- Political organisation
- Category:Political party alliances
- Popular front
- Power sharing
- Unholy alliance
- United front
