= Popular Movement for the Development of the Republic of West Africa =

The Popular Movement for the Development of the Republic of West Africa (PMD) was a political party in Mali.

== History ==
The party received 2.7% of the vote in the 1992 parliamentary elections, winning six seats.

The party boycotted the July 1997 parliamentary elections after the annulment of the April elections.
