= 1957 French Sudan Territorial Assembly election =

- 31 March 1957
- All 70 seats in the Territorial Assembly; 36 seats needed for a majority
- Turnout: 33.93%
Party	Leader	Vote %	Seats	+/–
US-RDA	Modibo Keïta	62.14	57	New
PRS	Fily Dabo Sissoko	27.49	6	New
UPB		6.28	7	New
This lists parties that won seats. See the complete results below.
Results by constituency

Territorial Assembly elections were held in French Sudan on 31 March 1957, the first elections in the territory to be held under universal suffrage. The result was a victory for the Sudanese Union – African Democratic Rally. which won 57 of the 70 seats. Voter turnout was just 34.0%.

== Results ==
Party	Votes	%	Seats
Sudanese Union – African Democratic Rally	435,976	62.14	57
Sudanese Progressive Party	192,908	27.49	6
Union of the Populations of Bandiagara	44,052	6.28	7
Dogon-Peul Action	24,409	3.48	0
Others	4,301	0.61	0
Total	701,646	100.00	70
Valid votes	701,646	98.95	
Invalid/blank votes	7,476	1.05	
Total votes	709,122	100.00	
Registered voters/turnout	2,090,048	33.93	
Source: De Benoist

=== Elected MPs ===
Of the 70 elected members, 30 were members of the intelligentsia, 30 were employees, five were merchants, two were traditional chiefs, two were farmers and one was a worker.

== Aftermath ==
Following the elections, the Union of the Populations of Bandiagara merged into the Sudanese Union – African Democratic Rally, giving it a total of 64 seats.
