= 1952 French Sudan Territorial Assembly election =

Territorial Assembly elections were held in French Sudan on March 30, 1952. The Sudanese Progressive Party remained the largest party, winning 28 of the 40 Second College seats. The Sudanese Union – African Democratic Rally won the remaining 13. seats

== Results ==
Party	Votes	%	Seats	+/–
First College
Rally of the French People	1,677		19	New
Other parties			0	–
Independents	150		1	–8
Total			20	0
Total votes	2,912	–		
Registered voters/turnout	5,157	56.47		
Second College
Sudanese Progressive Party	192,957		27	−1
Sudanese Union – African Democratic Rally	101,902		13	+11
Other parties			0	–
Total			40	+10
Total votes	261,533	–		
Registered voters/turnout	925,131	28.27		
Source: De Benoist
