= Dogon-Peul Action =

Dogon-Peul Action (French: Action dogon-peul) was a candidature in the 1957 French Sudan Territorial Assembly election. The list obtained 24,409 votes (3.44%), but won no seats. Dogon-Peul Action was one of the regional lists that sought to challenge the dominance of the Sudanese Union-African Democratic Rally.
