= Rally for Democracy and Progress (Mali) =

Political party in Mali

The Rally for Democracy and Progress (French: Rassemblement pour la Démocratie et le Prògres; RDP) is a political party in Mali.

== History ==
The party was established in October 1990 by expatriate Malians living in Gabon, and was officially registered on 19 April 1991. In the country's first multi-party elections since independence in 1992 it won four seats in the National Assembly. In the presidential elections later in the year it nominated Almamy Sylla as its candidate. Sylla finished fourth with 9.4% of the vote.

Sylla was the party's presidential candidate again in the 1997 elections, but received only 1% of the vote. The party then boycotted the July 1997 parliamentary elections following the annulment of the April elections, in which it had received 2% of the vote. The boycott led to a split in the party, with moderates breaking away to form the National Rally for Democracy, which did run in the elections, winning one seat.

The 2002 presidential elections saw Sylla run again, but his vote share was reduced to 0.6%.

The party contested the 2013 parliamentary elections, but failed to win a seat.
