= 1946–47 French Sudan General Council election =

General Council elections were held in French Sudan in December 1946 and 5 January 1947.

== Electoral system ==
The General Council was elected using two voting lists. The First College elected 20 seats, whilst the Second College elected 30.

== Results ==
Party	First round			Second round			Total seats
Party	Votes	%	Seats	Votes	%	Seats	Total seats
First College
Defence of the Interests of Sudan			3			0	3
French Section of the Workers' International			3			0	3
Sudanese Progressive Party			1			0	1
French-African Union			0			4	4
Independents			7			2	9
Total			14			6	20
Total votes	1,483	–					
Registered voters/turnout	3,346	44.32					
Second College
Sudanese Progressive Party			5			16	21
Community of Yatenga			4			0	4
Sudanese Union – African Democratic Rally			2			0	2
Marka, Peul, Bobo, Samogo Union			0			2	2
Independents			0			1	1
Total			11			19	30
Total votes	70,409	–					
Registered voters/turnout	156,270	45.06					
Source: De Benoist
