= Coalition =

Group that agrees to work together to achieve a common goal

A coalition is formed when two or more people or groups temporarily work together to achieve a common goal. The term is most frequently used to denote a formation of power in political, military, or economic spaces.

== Formation ==
According to A Guide for Political Parties published by the National Democratic Institute and the Oslo Center for Peace and Human Rights, there are five steps to coalition building. The first step in coalition building involves developing a party strategy that will prepare for successful negotiation. The more effort parties place on this step, the more likely they are to identify strategic partners, negotiate a good deal and avoid some of the common mistakes associated with coalition building.

The second step is negotiating a coalition. Based on the strategy that each party has prepared, the parties come together to negotiate and reach an agreement on the coalition terms. Depending on the context and objectives of the coalition, these negotiations may be completely secret or partially public. While some issues may be agreed on with relative ease, others may be more contentious and require different approaches to reach a compromise.

As negotiations conclude, the agreement between political parties needs to be formally sealed. This third step includes finalizing a written agreement, securing formal approval of the deal from the relevant structures of the coalition's member parties and announcing the coalition details to the general public. The next step involves working in coalition. As the coalition partners begin working to implement their agreement, they will need to maintain good relations by continuing efforts to increase or sustain trust and communication among the member parties. Each party will also need to find a balance between respecting its obligations to the coalition and maintaining its individual identity.

The final step is to identify lessons learned. Regardless of whether it plans to move forward alone or in another coalition, it is important for each party to review and document lessons learned from each coalition-building experience. This will make it possible to get a clearer picture of the positive and negative impacts of coalition-building on the party and to identify lessons learned that can inform any future coalition-building efforts.

Coalitions manifest in a variety of forms, types, and terms of duration. Campaign coalitions are high intensity and involve long-term cooperation. Federations are characterized by a relatively lower degree of involvement, intensity, and participation, also involving long-term cooperation, but with members' primary commitment remaining with their own entities. Instrumental coalitions have low-intensity involvement without a foundation to mediate conflict. Finally, event-based coalitions are those that have a high level of involvement and the potential for future collaboration.

In contrast to alliances, coalitions may be termed partnerships of unequals, since comparative political, economic, and military might, as well as the extent to which a nation is prepared to commit to the coalition, dictate influence. Coalitions can often occur as unplanned responses to situations of danger, uncertainty, or extraordinary events, directed at interim objectives.

== Function ==
Coalitions can be classified as internal or external. Internal coalitions consist of people who are already in an organization, such as a workplace. For example, a trade union is a type of coalition formed to represent employees' wages, benefits, and working conditions. Without this unity between employees, workers may be subjugated to harsh working environments and low pay due to no practical regulations. Often, organizations prefer to meet with members of their respective internal coalitions before implementing changes in the workplace to ensure support.

In contrast, external coalitions consist of people that are members of different organizations who collaborate their efforts to achieve an overall objective. For example, in order to prevent gun violence and advocate gun control, several groups, unions, and nonprofit organizations banded together to form the Coalition to Stop Gun Violence. External coalitions base their confidence in gaining credibility on inviting unlikely partners who wish to attain the same end goal, even if the reasons to achieve the goal differ.

== Use ==
=== Government and politics ===
Coalition governments are coalitions of legislative groups to form governments. Most typical analyses of coalitions in politics deal with the formation of multiparty cabinets in parliamentary regimes. In Germany, every administration has been a multiparty coalition since the conclusion of the Second World War – an example of coalition government creation in a parliamentary system. When different winning coalitions can be formed in a parliament, the party composition of the government may depend on the bargaining power of each party and the presence or lack of a dominant party.

Groups of political entities can be called parliamentary groups or caucuses. Fluid coalitions, which change with each vote, exist in the European Parliament and Swiss parliament to pass legislation.

Pre-election coalitions due to electoral thresholds are also called electoral alliances.

=== International relations ===
Diagram of some international coalitions established by Brazil, China, India, Mexico, Russia and South Africa: BASIC, BRICS, G5 and IBSA

The temporary collaboration of two or more separate parties with a set goal and common purpose can be viewed as a coalition in international relations. Coalition competitions are represented in international political dynamics. A coalition can be an ad hoc grouping of nations united for specific purposes. Although persons and groups form coalitions for many and varied reasons, the most common purpose is to combat a common threat or to take advantage of a certain opportunity, resulting in the often temporary nature of coalitions. The common threat or existence of opportunity is what gives rise to the coalition and allows it to exist as all parties involved see the benefit in working together. Such collaborative processes allow the actors of the coalition to approach a common goal or accomplish the same task. The behavior and dynamics of coalitions in international relations are created by commonalities and differences within the groups joining together. Rationality, group dynamics, and gender are all contributing factors of coalitional behaviors in an international security framework.

=== Economics ===
Economic agents can form coalitions. When a coalition is formed around economic goals, the reasoning is financial. In economics, when two opposing sectors, such as a buyer and seller or two sellers, come together, it can be thought of as a coalition in the denotative sense, as the two groups come together temporarily to achieve a goal. One example would be the 1997 deal between Microsoft and Apple. The deal consisted of Microsoft rescuing the then-struggling Apple with a cash infusion of $150 million. Unions can be viewed as coalitions of workers, usually of the same job sector. When the agents considered are countries, the formation of an international treaty (e.g. trade agreements or international environmental agreements) can also be seen as a coalition. In economics, a coalition's formation and its stability is mostly studied using game theory.

=== Civil society ===
In civil society, a coalition denotes a group effort or a population of people coming together who believe strongly in their cause. The term also describes alliances between civil society organizations, such as labor unions, community organizations, and religious institutions. In France for example, workers from different sectors and unions band together to aid each other in communicating a point. This coalition of unions is often very effective as it can cause massive inconvenience to the country. The formation of coalitions such as the Community-Labor Coalition have proven to be an important strategy for social change in many contexts. In social groups, a coalition often forms from private citizens uniting behind a common goal or purpose, sometimes within a coalitional identity. Many of these private citizen groups form grassroots organizations, such as the Christian Coalition, which is the largest grassroots political group in the US. Activist groups in civil society are also viewed as coalitions for their respective cause. These activists are joined together by their belief in what they want to achieve or accomplish.

=== Military ===
Military coalitions can be built and united under a singular power by multiple states and governments. They are fluid in terms of membership – not only does a country not have to have been a traditional ally to join a coalition, but nations can join, vary their contributions and caveats, withdraw, and be replaced by new members as the situation changes or national agendas change. The expansion of assets accessible to member nations to perform military operations is a crucial attribute of coalitions. In many ways, coalition warfare serves to make the crafting of a peace more difficult than winning the war itself. An example of such a coalition happened after World War I during the 1919 Versailles Peace Conference, when the Allied powers attempted to reach a peace agreement.

Examples of military coalitions include the Coalition of the Gulf War, when George H. W. Bush ended Saddam Hussein's aggression in the Middle East by enlisting and leading a military coalition in the 1991 Gulf War's Operation Desert Storm as well as his son George W. Bush's efforts in the Coalition of the Willing, a phrase employed during the 2003 campaign for the war in Iraq led by the US and its allies. A contemporary example is the United Nations coalition that intervened in the 2011 Libyan Civil War against Muammar Gaddafi. For coalitions to be effective in principle or in action, participating nations have tended to require a single overpowering threat – perhaps to freedom or a way of life or a crucial national interest – or the presence of a single despotic figure or regime whose continued existence is considered not only abhorrent to the generality of nations but also destabilizing to the region or world order.

=== Mathematics ===
In mathematics, the term coalition is linked to an equation which uses the coalition model for exponential population growth. This analytical equation was first published by mathematician Pierre François Verhulst in 1838 to allow for the approximation of the world's population at a given time by applying differential and integral techniques.

== See also ==
- Collaborative leadership
- Multi-party system
- Popular front
- Syndicate
- United front
- List of countries with coalition governments
- The Evolution of Cooperation by Robert Axelrod
