= Union of the Populations of Bandiagara =

French Sudanese political party

The Union of the Populations of Bandiagara (French: Union des Populations de Bandiagara, UPB) was a political party in French Sudan.

== History ==
The party was active only in the region of Bandiagara. In the 1957 elections it received 64% of the vote in the region, winning all seven seats.

Shortly after the elections it merged into the ruling Sudanese Union – African Democratic Rally, which had won 57 seats.
