= Alternation Bloc for Renewal, Integration, and African Cooperation =

Political party in Mali

The Bloc for Democracy and African Integration (French: Bloc des alternances pour le renouveau, l’intégration et la coopération africaine) is a political party in Mali. In the 1 July and 22 July 2007 Malian parliamentary elections, the party won 2 out of 160 seats. The party is affiliated to the Alliance for Democracy and Progress, that supports president Amadou Toumani Touré.

The party contested the 2013 parliamentary elections, but failed to win a seat.
