= Union of Democratic Forces for Progress =

Political party in Mali

The Union of Democratic Forces for Progress (French: Union des forces démocratiques pour le progrès, UFDP) is a political party in Mali led by Youssouf Traoré.

== History ==
The party was founded in May 1991, and officially registered on 16 May. It won three seats in the 1992 parliamentary elections.

The UFDP boycotted the July 1997 parliamentary elections after the April elections had been annulled. It contested the 2002 parliamentary elections as part of the Convergence for Alternation and Change alliance, which won ten seats.

The party did not run in the 2013 parliamentary elections.
