= 1964 Malian parliamentary election =

Parliamentary elections were held in Mali on 12 June 1964. Voters were presented with a single list from the Sudanese Union – African Democratic Rally (US-RDA), which had been the sole legal party since shortly after independence in 1960. As a result, it won all 80 seats in the National Assembly. According to official results, 99 percent of those who voted approved the US-RDA list.

== Results ==
Party	Votes	%	Seats	+/–
Sudanese Union – African Democratic Rally	2,154,711	100.00	80	0
Total	2,154,711	100.00	80	0
Valid votes	2,154,711	99.90		
Invalid/blank votes	2,185	0.10		
Total votes	2,156,896	100.00		
Registered voters/turnout	2,425,696	88.92		
Source: Sternberger et al.
