= Mamadou Lamine Traoré =

Malian politician

Mamadou Lamine Traoré (January 2, 1947 – July 21, 2007) was a Malian politician and President of the Movement for the Independence, Renaissance, and Integration of Africa (MIRIA) political party.

He was a leading figure in the struggle against President Moussa Traoré, which culminated in the latter's ouster on March 26, 1991. Mamadou Lamine Traoré then became a member of the Transitional Committee for Public Safety, which existed from 1991 to 1992. Upon the founding of the Alliance for Democracy in Mali (ADEMA-PASJ), Traoré became its First Vice-President at its constitutive congress, held on May 25–26, 1991. After elections, in the new government under President Alpha Oumar Konaré he became Minister of State in charge of Territorial Administration and Security from June 9, 1992 to April 16, 1993, then Minister of State in charge of Territorial Administration and Decentralization from the latter date until November 7, 1993.

Traoré left ADEMA in 1994 to form his own party, MIRIA. He was one of many opposition leaders who were arrested on August 9, 1997, in connection with the killing of a police officer at a rally on August 8; they were charged on August 14. Under the presidency of Amadou Toumani Touré, Traoré was appointed Minister of National Education in the new government named on June 14, 2002. He served in that position until his death, which followed a long illness, in July 2007.
