= Democratic Party for Justice =

Political party in Mali

The Democratic Party for Justice (French: Parti Démocratique pour la Justice, PDJ) is a political party in Mali led by Abdoul Ba.

== History ==
The party was established in 1991 and officially registered on 19 April 1991. It received 2.4% of the vote in the July 1997 parliamentary elections, winning a single seat. It joined the Alliance for the Republic and Democracy prior to the 2002 parliamentary elections. The Alliance won 59 seats in total, with the PDJ winning one.

The party did not contest the 2013 parliamentary elections.
