= 1991 Malian coup d'état =

Coup d'état

Date	March 26, 1991
Location	Bamako, Mali
Result	Coup d'état successful: Moussa Traoré ousted; Amadou Toumani Touré took control of the country

Belligerents
Government of Mali	Army faction

Commanders and leaders
Moussa Traoré	Amadou Toumani Touré

The 26 March 1991 Malian coup d'état resulted in the overthrow of President Moussa Traoré after over two decades of dictatorship and eventually led to multi-party elections.

== Background ==
In 1968, Traoré had himself led a military coup d'état, ousting the first president of Mali, Modibo Keïta, and making himself the second. On 25 October 1990, opposition to his decades-long rule coalesced into the Alliance for Democracy in Mali (ADEMA), an umbrella organization for opposition groups. Unrest grew as the people blamed the regime's corruption and mismanagement for the economic troubles they faced. Further, Traoré had to institute austerity programs to satisfy the International Monetary Fund, causing increased hardship for all but the rich.

ADEMA and other pro-democracy groups demanded the end of the one-party state. On 22 March, tens of thousands of students and others marched through the streets of Bamako, the nation's capital. Government soldiers fired on the peaceful demonstrators, killing 28 and setting off days of rioting. Sources vary as to the toll: the opposition claimed 148 killed and hundreds wounded, while Traoré said there were 27 deaths. Traoré declared a state of emergency and met with opposition leaders. He offered concessions, but refused to step down as they demanded. A general strike was called for 25 March. This time, the soldiers had had enough and did nothing to stop it.

== Coup ==
Lieutenant Colonel Amadou Toumani Touré launched a coup that deposed Traoré. As news spread, hospital sources reported at least another 59 dead and 200 wounded, including revenge killings. Education Minister Bakary Traore and Mamadou Diarra, the former leader's brother-in-law, were burned to death.

The National Reconciliation Council (soon renamed the Transitional Committee for the Salvation of the People), chaired by Touré, was set up to run the country temporarily, until civilian government was reestablished in 1992 after constitutional referendum, presidential and parliamentary elections.

== Aftermath ==
Former President Moussa Traoré was imprisoned in 1992 and sentenced to death. However, President Alpha Oumar Konaré first commuted his sentence to life imprisonment, then pardoned him and his wife in May 2002 as Konaré's term in office came to an end.

Russian political scientist Andrey Korotayev later cited the 1991 coup as an example of a "coupvolution", as it was carried out in support of pro-democracy protests.

== See also ==
- 1968 Malian coup d'état
- 2012 Malian coup d'état
- 2020 Malian coup d'état
