= 1992 Malian presidential election =

- 12 April 1992 (first round); 26 April 1992 (second round)
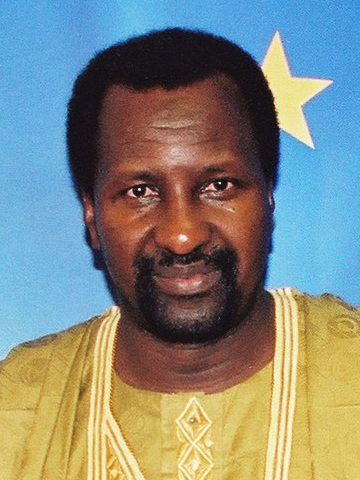

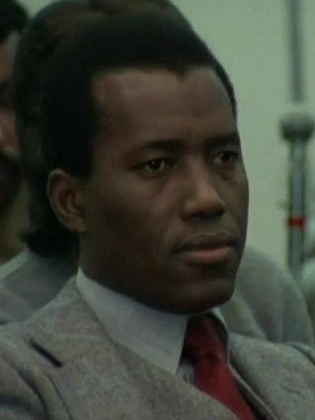
Nominee	Alpha Oumar Konaré	Tiéoulé Mamadou Konaté
Party	ADEMA-PASJ	US-RDA
Popular vote	655,555	294,524
Percentage	69.00%	31.00%
President before election
Amadou Toumani Touré
Independent
Elected President
Alpha Oumar Konaré
ADEMA-PASJ

Presidential elections were held in Mali on 12 April 1992, with a second round on 26 April. They were the first presidential elections in the country to feature more than one candidate following the reintroduction of multi-party democracy after a coup the previous year. The coup had followed a student protest in March 1991 during which troops defending President Moussa Traoré fired and killed numerous protesters. The result was a victory for Alpha Oumar Konaré of the Alliance for Democracy in Mali, who defeated Tiéoulé Mamadou Konaté of the Sudanese Union – African Democratic Rally.

== Results ==
Candidate	Party	First round		Second round	
Candidate	Party	Votes	%	Votes	%
Alpha Oumar Konaré	Alliance for Democracy in Mali	493,973	45.00	655,555	69.00
Tiéoulé Mamadou Konaté	Sudanese Union – African Democratic Rally	159,169	14.50	294,524	31.00
Mountaga Tall	National Congress for Democratic Initiative	125,140	11.40		
Almamy Sylla	Rally for Democracy and Progress	103,185	9.40		
Baba Hakib Haidara	Sudanese Union – African Democratic Rally	76,840	7.00		
Idrisa Traoré	Party for Democracy and Progress	49,397	4.50		
Amadou Niangadou	Rally for Labour Democracy	43,909	4.00		
Mamadou Diaby	Party for Unity, Democracy and Progress	24,150	2.20		
Bamba Diallo	Independent	21,954	2.00		
Total		1,097,717	100.00	950,079	100.00
Valid votes		1,097,717	97.30	950,079	98.00
Invalid/blank votes		30,461	2.70	19,389	2.00
Total votes		1,128,178	100.00	969,468	100.00
Registered voters/turnout		4,780,416	23.60	4,780,416	20.28
Source: Nohlen et al.
