= 1959 French Sudan parliamentary election =

Parliamentary elections were held in French Sudan on 8 March 1959. The result was a victory for the Sudanese Union – African Democratic Rally (US-RDA), which won all 80 seats. Voter turnout was just 32.3%. The following year, French Sudan declared independence as Mali, and was declared a one-party state with the US-RDA as the sole legal party. As a result, these would be the last multi-party elections held in the country until 1992.

== Results ==
Party	Votes	%	Seats	+/–
Sudanese Union – African Democratic Rally	515,869	76.00	80	+23
Sudanese Regroupment Party	162,906	24.00	0	–6
Total	678,775	100.00	80	+10
Valid votes	678,775	97.90		
Invalid/blank votes	14,560	2.10		
Total votes	693,335	100.00		
Registered voters/turnout	2,148,667	32.27		
Source: Nohlen et al.
