= Citizens' Party for Revival =

Political party in Mali

- Founded: 9 July 2005
- Ideology: Liberalism
- Political position: Centre
- National affiliation: Alliance for Democracy and Progress
- Regional affiliation: Africa Liberal Network
- International affiliation: Liberal International (Observer)

The Citizens' Party for Revival (French: Parti citoyen pour le renouveau) is a liberal political party in Mali. In the 1 July and 22 July 2007 Malian parliamentary elections, the party won 1 out of 160 seats. The party is affiliated to the Alliance for Democracy and Progress, which supported former president Amadou Toumani Touré.

The party contested the 2013 parliamentary elections, but failed to win a seat.
