= Niambia =

- Commune
- Location in Mali
- Coordinates: 13°37′20″N 11°21′08″W
- Country: Mali
- Region: Kayes Region
- Cercle: Bafoulabé Cercle
- Elevation: 148 m (486 ft)

Population (2009 census)
  - Total: 7,712
- Time zone: UTC+0 (GMT)

Niambia is a commune in the Cercle of Bafoulabé in the Kayes Region of south-western Mali. The main village (chef-lieu) is Horokoto. In the 2009 census the commune had a population of 7,712.

== Population history ==
Historical population
Year	Pop.	±%
1998 (census)	4,545	—
2009 (estimate)	7,712	+69.7%
