= Pseudouridine-5'-phosphatase =

Protein-coding gene in the species Homo sapiens

PUDP

Identifiers
- Aliases: PUDP, DXF68S1E, FAM16AX, GS1, HDHD1A, HDHD1, pseudouridine 5'-phosphatase
- External IDs: OMIM: 306480; MGI: 1914615; GeneCards: PUDP
Available structures
PDB	Ortholog search: PDBe RCSB
PDB	List of PDB id codes 3L5K
Enzyme activity
EC #	BRENDA	ExPASy	KEGG	MetaCyc
3.1.3.96	↗	↗	↗	↗

Gene location (Human)
Chr.	X chromosome (human)
Band	Xp22.31	Start	6,667,865 bp
Band	Xp22.31	End	7,148,158 bp

Gene location (Mouse)
Chr.	Chromosome 18 (mouse)
Band	18|18 D1	Start	50,696,948 bp
Band	18|18 D1	End	50,734,491 bp
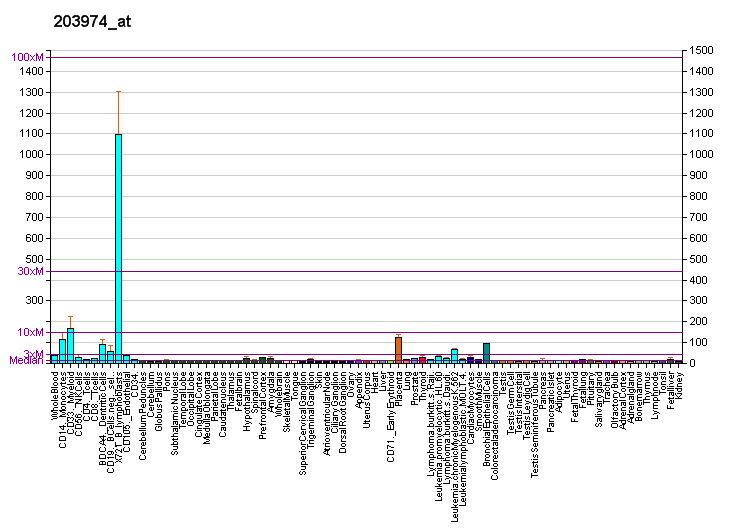
RNA expression pattern
Bgee	Human / Mouse (ortholog); Top expressed in: Skeletal muscle tissue of rectus abdominis; gonad; mucosa of sigmoid colon; biceps brachii; secondary oocyte; deltoid muscle; Skeletal muscle tissue of biceps brachii; tibialis anterior muscle; epithelium of bronchus; bronchial epithelial cell / Top expressed in: seminiferous tubule; spermatid; spermatocyte; zygote; secondary oocyte; primary oocyte; islet of Langerhans; More reference expression data
BioGPS	More reference expression data
Gene ontology
Molecular function	pseudouridine 5'-phosphatase activity; hydrolase activity; metal ion binding; phosphatase activity; molecular function; magnesium ion binding
Cellular component	cytosol; cytoplasm
Biological process	pyrimidine nucleoside salvage; metabolism; nucleotide metabolic process; dephosphorylation; biological process
Sources:Amigo / QuickGO
Orthologs
Databases	NCBI: entry; OMA: entry
Species	Human	Mouse
Entrez	8226	67365
Ensembl	ENSG00000130021	ENSMUSG00000048875
UniProt	Q08623	Q9D5U5
RefSeq (mRNA)	NM_012080; NM_001135565; NM_001178135; NM_001178136	NM_026108
RefSeq (protein)	NP_001129037; NP_001171606; NP_001171607; NP_036212	NP_080384
Location (UCSC)	Chr X: 6.67 – 7.15 Mb	Chr 18: 50.7 – 50.73 Mb
PubMed search
- Wikidata
View/Edit Human	View/Edit Mouse

Pseudouridine-5'-phosphatase is an enzyme that in humans is encoded by the PUDP gene (previously HDHD1A). This enzyme acts to remove the phosphate from pseudouridine 5'-phosphate, producing pseudouridine which is excreted intact in urine. In addition to pseudouridine 5'-phosphate, it can also accommodate other phopshorylated metabolites but with a lower affinity.
