= Convention for Progress and the People =

Political party in Mali

The Convention for Progress and the People (French: Convention Parti du Peuple, lit. Convention Party of the People; CPP or COPP) is a political party in Mali led by Mamadou Gakou.

== History ==
The party was established and registered in November 1996. It put forward Soumana Sacko as its candidate in the 1997 presidential elections. Sacko finished third with 2% of the vote. The July 1997 parliamentary elections saw the party run in alliance with ADEMA. The alliance won a seat in Banamba in the second round of voting, with the seat taken by COPP.

The party nominated Gackou for the 2002 presidential elections, but he received just 0.7% of the vote. The party did not contest the 2013 parliamentary elections.
