= Horokoto =

- Village
- Location in Mali
- Coordinates: 13°37′16″N 11°21′6″W
- Country: Mali
- Region: Kayes Region
- Cercle: Bafoulabé Cercle
- Commune: Niambia
- Time zone: UTC+0 (GMT)

Horokoto is a village and principal settlement (chef-lieu) of the commune of Niambia in the Cercle of Bafoulabé in the Kayes Region of south-western Mali.
