= July 1997 Malian parliamentary election =

Parliamentary elections were held in Mali on 20 July 1997, with a second round on 3 August. They followed the April elections, which had been annulled by the Constitutional Court due to "serious irregularities". The result was a victory for the Alliance for Democracy in Mali, which won 128 of the 147 seats elected in the country, a further 13 being elected by Malians living abroad. The elections were boycotted by the National Congress for Democratic Initiative, the Sudanese Union-African Democratic Rally, the Popular Movement for the Development of the Republic of West Africa, the Rally for Democracy and Progress, the Rally for Labour Democracy, the Union of Democratic Forces for Progress and the Malian Union for Democracy and Development. Voter turnout was just 22%.

== Results ==
Party	Votes	%	Seats	+/–
Alliance for Democracy in Mali	698,690	62.85	128	+52
Party for National Rebirth	78,750	7.08	8	New
ADEMA–PARENA	69,913	6.29	–	–
Party for Unity, Democracy, and Progress	51,686	4.65	0	–
Union for Democracy and Development	38,804	3.49	2	–2
ADEMA–UDD	33,365	3.00	–	–
Social Democratic Convention	32,398	2.91	4	New
Democratic Party for Justice	26,910	2.42	1	New
ADEMA–PDP	14,518	1.31	2	–
ADEMA–PARENA–PDP	14,093	1.27	–	–
Malian Rally for Labour	9,803	0.88	0	–
Citizens Movement–Circle of Republican Democrats	9,343	0.84	0	–
Malian Union for Democracy and Development	6,964	0.63	0	–1
ADEMA–COPP	5,549	0.50	1	–
Malian Party for Development and Renewal	5,218	0.47	0	–
Alliance for Economic and Social Development	2,216	0.20	0	–
Union of Democratic Forces	1,669	0.15	0	–
National Union for Renewal	672	0.06	0	–
Movement for Democracy and Development	239	0.02	0	–
Rally for Justice and Progress	147	0.01	0	–
National Rally for Democracy			1	New
Independents	10,810	0.97	0	–
Total	1,111,757	100.00	147	+18
Valid votes	1,111,757	98.06		
Invalid/blank votes	22,012	1.94		
Total votes	1,133,769	100.00		
Registered voters/turnout	5,254,299	21.58		
Source: N'Diaye
