= Malian Union for Democracy and Development =

Political party in Mali

The Malian Union for Democracy and Development (French: Union Malienne pour la Démocratie et le Développement, UMADD} was a political party in the Ménaka Cercle area of Mali. It was seen as a party of the Ikelan, although many supporters were from the Imghad population.

== History ==
UMADD was established in April 1991. In the 1992 parliamentary elections it contested only one single-member constituency in Ménaka, but saw its candidate win the seat with 73% of the vote.

Although the party lost its sole seat in the July 1997 elections, the 1999 local elections saw it win 10 of the 21 seats on Ménaka council

On 19 May 2004 the party merged into Rally for Mali.
