= Labor–Greens coalition (disambiguation) =

In Australian politics, a Labor–Greens coalition or a red–green coalition is a coalition agreement between two parties: the centre-left, social democratic Australian Labor Party and the left-wing, progressive Australian Greens. These agreements have occurred at both the state and territory level and in some local councils.

The term usually refers to:

- Labor–Greens coalition, a coalition that formerly formed government in the Australian Capital Territory (2012–2024).
- Labor–Green Accord, a similar coalition arrangement that formerly existed in Tasmania (1989–1990).

== See also ==
- Red–green alliance, a term used in European politics for an alliance between a socially democratic or socialist party and a green party
- Traffic light coalition, a term coined in Germany that is used for a coalition between three parties, with one each using the colours red, green and yellow
