= Party for Democracy and Progress (Mali) =

Political party in Mali

The Party for Democracy and Progress (French: Parti pour la Démocratie et le Progrès, PDP) is a political party in Mali led by Mady Konaté.

== History ==
The party was established in 1991, and officially registered on 25 April that year. It party received 5.1% of the vote in the February 1992 parliamentary elections, winning two seats. In the April 1992 presidential elections it nominated Idrissa Traoré as its candidate. Traoré finished fifth out of nine candidates with 7.1%^ of the vote. The local elections in the same year saw the party win 40 of the 751 seats across the country.

Traoré was the party's candidate again in the 1997 presidential elections, but his vote share was reduced to 1.2%. The party retained its two seats in the parliamentary elections, running in alliance with ADEMA. In the local elections held in 1998–99 the party won 96 of the 10,545 seats available. The 2002 presidential elections saw the party nominate Mady Konaté as its candidate, but he received just 0.7% of the vote.

The party did not contest the 2013 parliamentary elections.
