= National Rally for Democracy (Mali) =

The National Rally for Democracy (French: Rassemblement national pour la démocratie) was a political party in Mali led by Abdoulaye Garba Tapo.

== History ==
The party was established on 25 July 1997, and won a single seat in the parliamentary elections that year. For the 2002 elections it was part of the Convergence for Alternance and Change alliance, which won ten seats.

The 2007 elections saw the party join the Alliance for Democracy and Progress, winning a single seat as the Alliance won a large majority in the National Assembly.

On 29 April 2008 it merged into the Alliance for Democracy in Mali.
