= 2007 Malian parliamentary election =

- 1 July 2007 (first round); 22 July 2007 (second round)

All 160 seats in the National Assembly

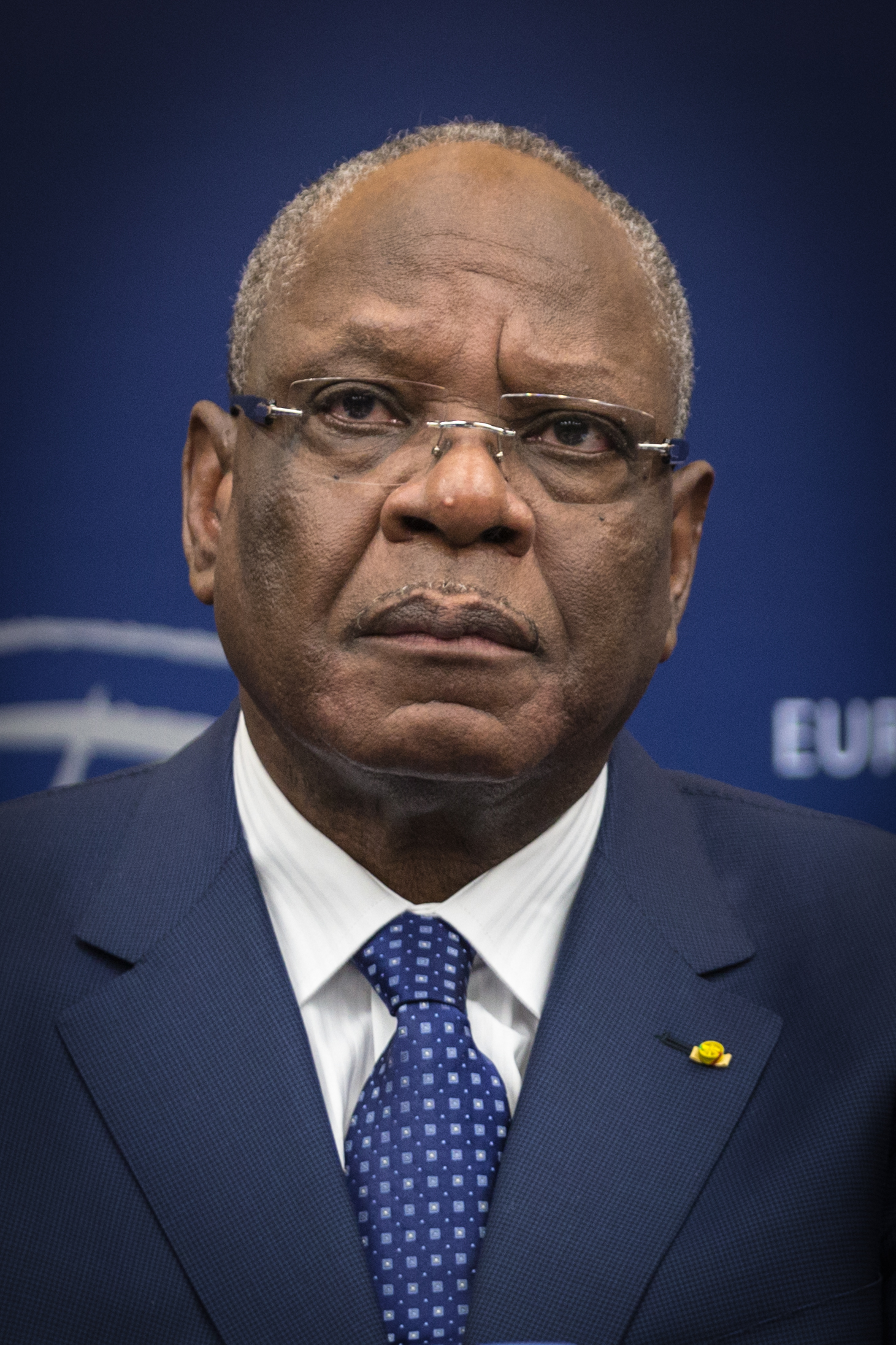
Leader	Younoussi Touré	Ibrahim Boubacar Keïta
Alliance	Alliance for Democracy and Progress (Mali)	Front for Democracy and the Republic
Seats won	113	15
President before election
Ibrahim Boubacar Keïta
RPM
Elected President
Dioncounda Traoré
ADEMA-PASJ

Parliamentary elections were held in Mali on 1 July 2007, with a second round on 22 July. In the first round, there were about 1,400 candidates for 147 seats in the National Assembly.

The elections followed the April 2007 presidential elections, in which President Amadou Toumani Touré won a second term with 71% of the vote.

== Background ==
The elections were conducted on the basis of candidate lists for each electoral district. 535 lists were deposited with the Constitutional Court in May: 125 joint lists for parties running candidates on the same list, another 278 lists for individual parties, and a further 132 independent lists. Five lists were rejected by the Constitutional Court on May 31. These included three independent lists (one in Tominian and two in Goundam), one joint list for the Alliance for Democracy in Mali (ADEMA), the Union for the Republic and Democracy (URD), and the Party for National Rebirth (PARENA) in Nioro du Sahel, and one joint list for the Patriotic Movement for Renewal (MPR) and URD in Mopti.

Ibrahim Boubacar Keïta of the Rally for Mali (RPM) and Oumar Mariko of the African Solidarity for Democracy and Independence (SADI), both of whom were defeated in the 2007 presidential election, stood as candidates in the parliamentary election: Keïta in Commune IV in Bamako, where 17 lists competed for the two available seats in the first round, and Mariko at the head of a list in Kolondieba. PARENA leader and 2007 presidential candidate Tiébilé Dramé was running on the ADEMA-URD-PARENA list in Nioro du Sahel that was rejected by the Constitutional Court on May 31. In rejecting this list, the Court said that one of the candidates on the list, Cheickna Hamala Bathily, had multiple birthplaces recorded.

== Campaign ==
The campaign for the election began on June 10 and continued until June 29.

The opposition sought a new voter file and new voter registration cards for the election, but this did not occur. 900 observers were accredited for the election, including 700 Malian and 200 international observers.

The campaign for the second round began on July 15. Although Touré urged people to vote, voter turnout in the second round was reportedly low.

== Conduct ==
The first round of the election on July 1 reportedly proceeded without incident, although voting was extended by four hours in Ségou due to heavy rain. Voter turnout was reportedly low. President Touré attributed this to Mali's system of automatic voter registration and uninspiring politicians, while Keïta argued that the voters were disillusioned, pointing to the April presidential election, which he alleged was fraudulent.

Observers from the West African Economic and Monetary Union praised the organization of the second round on July 24, but criticized low voter turnout. A few arrests for fraud were reported, mostly of people with multiple voter cards.

== Results ==
Final first round results from the Constitutional Court were announced on July 14, confirming provisional results released on July 6. 13 seats were won in the first round, all of them by parties included in the pro-Touré Alliance for Democracy and Progress (ADP) coalition: nine seats for the Alliance for Democracy in Mali (ADEMA), three for the Union for the Republic and Democracy (URD), and one for the National Rally for Democracy (RND). Out of 55 districts, eight were decided in the first round, leaving 47 districts (and 134 seats) to be decided in the second round. In the eight districts won in the first round, an ADEMA-RND list won three seats in Mopti District, a URD list (including former prime minister Younoussi Touré) won two seats in Niafunké District, an ADEMA list won one seat in Diré District, an ADEMA list won three seats in Gao District, an ADEMA list won one seat in Ménaka District, an ADEMA list won one seat in Abeibara District, a URD list won one seat in Téssalit District, and an ADEMA list won one seat in Tin-Essako District. Voter turnout in the first round was placed at 33.39%.

Provisional second round results showed the ADP had won a total of 116 seats (in both rounds). Of the ADP parties, ADEMA had the most seats with a total of 55, followed by URD with a total of 35. The opposition parties grouped into the Front for Democracy and the Republic (FDR) had 15 seats, 11 for the RPM and four for PARENA. SADI, which is not part of the ADP or the FDR, had four seats. Independents had 13 seats.

Final results announced by the Constitutional Court on August 11 showed the ADP with 113 seats (including 51 for ADEMA and 34 for the URD), the FDR with 15 seats, independents with 15 seats, and SADI with four seats. ADEMA lost four of the seats it had in the provisional results due to the court's ruling that electoral fraud occurred in three districts: Koulikoro, Goundam and Tombouctou. 15 parties won seats.

A number of important politicians failed to win seats in the first round and faced the second round: Keïta, Mariko, National Congress for Democratic Initiative President Mountaga Tall in Ségou, and ADEMA President Dioncounda Traoré in Nara. All of them were successful in the second round. Second round turnout was estimated at 12% in Bamako and 33% in the countryside.

Party or alliance		First round			Second round			Total seats
Party or alliance		Votes	%	Seats	Votes	%	Seats	Total seats
Alliance for Democracy and Progress	Alliance for Democracy in Mali			9			42	51
Alliance for Democracy and Progress	Union for the Republic and Democracy			3			31	34
Alliance for Democracy and Progress	Patriotic Movement for Renewal			0			8	8
Alliance for Democracy and Progress	National Congress for Democratic Initiative			0			7	7
Alliance for Democracy and Progress	Union for Democracy and Development			0			3	3
Alliance for Democracy and Progress	Movement for the Independence, Renaissance, and Integration of Africa			0			2	2
Alliance for Democracy and Progress	Party for Solidarity and Progress			0			2	2
Alliance for Democracy and Progress	Alternation Bloc for Renewal, Integration, and African Cooperation			0			2	2
Alliance for Democracy and Progress	Bloc for Democracy and African Integration			0			1	1
Alliance for Democracy and Progress	Citizens' Party for Revival			0			1	1
Alliance for Democracy and Progress	National Rally for Democracy			1			0	1
Alliance for Democracy and Progress	Sudanese Union – African Democratic Rally			0			1	1
Alliance for Democracy and Progress	Total			13			100	113
Front for Democracy and the Republic	Rally for Mali			0			11	11
Front for Democracy and the Republic	Party for National Rebirth			0			4	4
Front for Democracy and the Republic	Total			0			15	15
African Solidarity for Democracy and Independence				0			4	4
Overseas voters				13				13
Independents				0			15	15
Total				26			134	160
Source: Les Echos, Panapress, L'Essor

== Aftermath ==
The new National Assembly began its new term on September 3. On this date it voted on a new President of the National Assembly, choosing between two ADP candidates: ADEMA's Dioncounda Traoré (who is also President of the ADP) and CNID's Mountaga Tall. Traoré prevailed, receiving 111 votes against 31 for Tall. There were five invalidated votes.
