= Bloc for Democracy and African Integration =

The Bloc for Democracy and African Integration (French: Bloc pour la démocratie et l'intégration africaine) was a political party in Mali.

== History ==
The party was established in April 1993.

The 2007 elections saw the party affiliate with the Alliance for Democracy and Progress that supported President Amadou Toumani Touré. It won 2 out of 160 seats in the National Assembly.

In August 2010 it merged with the Sudanese Union – African Democratic Rally to form the Malian Union for the African Democratic Rally.
