= Sudanese Regroupment Party =

Former political party in French Sudan

The Sudanese Regroupment Party (French: Parti du Regroupement Soudanais, PRS) was a political party in French Sudan led by Fily Dabo Sissoko. Politically it represented a conservative traditionalist position, and drew support from traditional chiefs and the colonial administration. It was founded in December 1945 by Sissoko, son of a canton chief, and Hamadoun Dicko, a former canton chief. The party sought gradual independence from France, seeking to preserve the influence of traditional elites.

== History ==
The party was established in 1946 as the Sudanese Progressive Party (Parti Progressiste Soudanais). In the French elections that year the party won two of three Sudanese seats in the French National Assembly. Sissoko and Jean Silvandre were elected. In total list of the party obtained 60,759 votes (64%). After the elections, the PSP parliamentarians joined the SFIO parliamentary group. In the 1951 French elections, the party won all three seats in French Sudan. Sissoko, Dicko and Silvandre were elected. The list of the party got 201 866 votes (59.7%).

However, after January 1956 PSP lost its role as a major actor in French Sudanese politics. The party received 161,911 votes in the January 1956 French elections, coming second to the Sudanese Union – African Democratic Rally (US-RDA). In July the same year a by-election was held after the death of Mamadou Konaté. The PSP again finished second, with 88,719 votes.

In 1957 the party became the French Sudanese section of the African Socialist Movement. It won six seats in the 1957 Territorial Assembly elections, with the US-RDA winning 57. After the defeat Sissoko changed the name of the party to PRS.

The party faced increasingly difficulties, with the US-RDA government blocking its ability to function normally. The French colonial authorities had withdrawn their support for the party, as they had begun considering good relations with the US-RDA as more useful. The party lost all six seats in the March 1959 elections, which saw the US-RDA win all 80 seats. On 31 March 1959, Sissoko declared, on behalf of the PRS politburo, that the party was merging into US-RDA. his decision was the result of a three-day party conference.
