= 1992 Malian constitutional referendum =

A constitutional referendum was held in Mali on 12 January 1992. The new constitution would restore multi-party democracy, create a division of powers between the President and National Assembly, and set a presidential term of five limits. It was approved by 99% of voters with a 44% turnout.

== Results ==
Choice	Votes	%
For	2,212,354	99.00
Against	22,347	1.00
Total	2,234,701	100.00
Valid votes	2,234,701	98.17
Invalid/blank votes	41,590	1.83
Total votes	2,276,291	100.00
Registered voters/turnout	5,233,432	43.50
Source: Nohlen et al.
