= Hamadoun Dicko =

Malian politician

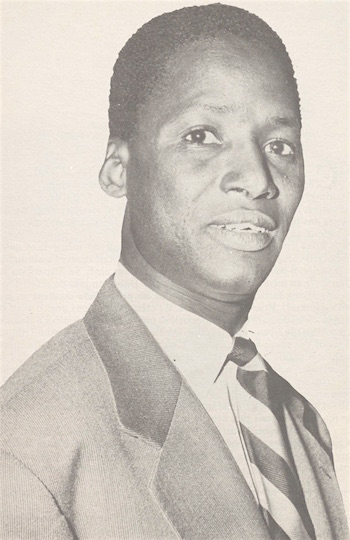
Hamadoun Dicko

Hamadoun Dicko (1924 in Diona, Mali – 1964 in Kidal, Mali) was a Malian politician who was elected to the French National Assembly in 1951.

In 1962, Dicko was arrested and imprisoned in Kidal, northern Mali. He was accused of leading the protest against President Modibo Keïta and the Malian governments monetary policies after the introduction of the Malian franc alongside Fily Dabo Sissoko. He died on 30th June 1964 while imprisoned in Kidal.
