= Movement for the Independence, Renaissance, and Integration of Africa =

Political party in Mali

The Movement for the Independence, Renaissance, and Integration of Africa (French: Mouvement pour l'indépendance, la renaissance et l'intégration africaine) was a political party in Mali.

The party was founded as a split from the Alliance for Democracy in Mali–Pan-African Party for Liberty, Solidarity and Justice (ADEMA-PASJ) on December 10, 1994, with Mamadou Lamine Traoré, who had been the First Vice-President of ADEMA-PASJ, as its President; Mamadou Kassa Traoré became the new party's First Vice-President, Mohamédoun Dicko its Second Vice-President, and Tiémoko Sangaré its Secretary-General (the latter two eventually returned to ADEMA-PASJ). The party supported Amadou Toumani Touré's successful candidacy in the 2002 presidential election, and afterwards MIRIA President Mamadou Lamine Traoré was named Minister of National Education.

MIRIA's Second National Conference, at which Traoré reiterated the party's support for Touré, opened on December 16, 2006. The party participated in the Alliance for Democracy and Progress, which backed Touré for re-election in the 2007 presidential election. Traoré died in July 2007. In the 1 July and 22 July 2007 parliamentary election, the party won two out of 160 seats.
