= Fily Dabo Sissoko =

Malian author and political leader

Fily Dabo Sissoko was a Malian writer and political leader, born 15 May 1900 at Horokoto (French Soudan, now in Mali's Bafoulabé Cercle). He died 30 June 1964, imprisoned at Kidal. Fily Dabo Sissoko is chiefly remembered as one of the most influential political leaders of pre-independence Mali, primary conservative rival to Mali's first President Modibo Keita, and an influential writer of the Negritude movement.

== Early life ==
Sissoko was of maninka ethnicity and he was the son of a local traditional ruler, Dabo Sissoko received his primary education at nearby Bafoulabé, before winning a place at the elite École normale supérieure William Ponty in Gorée (Senegal).

He was a teacher at the Bafoulabé Regional school until he succeeded his father and became "chef de canton" of Niambia in 1933. Sissoko took part in French politics, supporting the Front populaire government in the 1930s and the Resistance during the Second World War. He received the Médaille de la Résistance after the war.

== Political career ==
In October 1945 he was elected deputy to the French Constitutional Assembly representing the Soudan-Niger non-citizen constituency. He was a member of the Republican and Resistance Union (URR). Sissoko was elected in a run-off, with 45.8% (1,277) of the vote. In the Constituent Assembly he joined the communist group and he was re-elected in the June and November elections of 1946. After the November 1946 election, he joined the SFIO group.

Dabo Sissoko was re-elected to that seat in 1951 and 1956. Between the fifth and eleventh November 1948, he was briefly nominated to the Ministerial position of Under Secretary of State for Industry and Commerce, at the urging of the Minister of the Interior Jules Moch, in the second government of Robert Schuman. Schuman, who was known to solemnly weigh up the religious credentials of potential ministers before appointing a cabinet, found it particularly difficult to accept the nomination of Dabo Sissoko in his government, as he was open about his traditional Dogon beliefs.

With Hamadoun Dicko, another former canton chief, Fily Dabo Sissoko founded in December 1945 the Parti Progressiste Soudanais (PSP). This was a conservative party led by African traditional rulers (including Sissoko), African officials of the French colonial administration, and the French government. The party sought gradual independence from France to preserve the influence of traditional elites. In 1957, in regional elections, the PSP was dealt its first major electoral defeat at the hands of the Union Soudanaise–Rassemblement Démocratique Africain (US/RDA) of Modibo Keïta. Until the fusion of the parties on the eve of independence in 1959, Fily Dabo Sissoko vigorously opposed the socialist political program of Modibo Keïta. Unsurprisingly, following Mali's 1960 independence, Modibo Keïta became leader. Following riots in 1962 by some business interests opposing the creation of the Malian franc (independent of the CFA Franc used by other former colonies), Dabo Sissoko was arrested and charged with sedition. Condemned to death after being found guilty an 'attempt to destabilize the state', Dabo Sissoko had his sentence commuted to life imprisonment. Imprisoned near Kidal he died under still controversial and unclear circumstances in 1964.

== Writer ==
Parallel to his political career, Dabo Sissoko became a well-known poet, essayist, and popular author. Associated with the Negritude movement, Dabo Sissoko helped form a Malian cultural identity, drawing from a range of ethnicities and oral literary traditions.

== Bibliography ==
- 1936 : La Politesse et la civilité des Noirs (essai publié dans le Bulletin de la recherche du Soudan)
- 1950 : Les Noirs et la culture : Introduction aux problèmes de l’évolution des peuples noirs (essai publié à New York)
- 1953 : Crayons et portraits (poems, Mulhouse, Imprimerie Union)
- 1953 : Harmakhis, poèmes du terroir africain (poems, Paris, Éditions de la Tour du Guet)
- 1955 : Sagesse noire, sentences et poèmes malinkés (poems, Paris, Éditions de la Tour du Guet)
- 1955 : La passion de Djimé (novel, Paris, Éditions de la Tour du Guet)
- 1957 : Coup de sagaie, controverse sur l’Union française (essay, Éditions La Tour du Guet, Paris,)
- 1959 : Une page est tournée (essay, Dakar, Diop)
- 1962 : La savane rouge (Avignon, Presses universelles)
- 1963 : Poèmes de l’Afrique noire (poems, Paris, Éditions Debresse)
- 1970 : Les Jeux de destin (poems, Paris, Éditions Jean Grassin)
- 1970 : Au-dessus des nuages de Madagascar au Kenya (poems, Paris, Éditions Jean Grassin)
