= National Congress for Democratic Initiative =

Political party in Mali

National Congress for Democratic Initiative Congrès National d'Initiative Démocratique
- President: Mountaga Tall
- Founded: 1990
- Dissolved: 2025
- National Assembly: 4 / 160

The National Congress for Democratic Initiative (French: Congrès national d'initiative démocratique, CNID; Bambara: Faso yiriwa ton) was a political party in Mali, founded in 1990 and led by Mountaga Tall.

In the first presidential election following the transition to democracy, held in 1992, Mountaga Tali received 11.41% of votes and placed third.

In 1995, a group of militants led by Tiébilé Dramé left the CNID to start the Party for National Renewal (French: Parti pour la renaissance nationale, PARENA).

The CNID, along with other opposition parties, boycotted the presidential election held on May 11, 1997. It also participated in a boycott of the July 1997 parliamentary election.

In 2002, Mountaga Tall received 3.77% in the first round of the presidential election. In the parliamentary election, held on 14 July 2002, the party won 13 out of 147 seats in the National Assembly as a part of the Hope 2002 coalition.

The CNID backed incumbent President Amadou Toumani Touré in the April 2007 presidential election. In the July 2007 parliamentary election, the CNID, part of the Alliance for Democracy and Progress (ADP), won seven out of 147 seats.

In January 2008, the party was in the midst of a dispute between its two top leaders: Tall, its President, and N'Diaye Bah, its Secretary-General (as well as Minister of Crafts and Tourism in the government). According to Bah, Tall had wanted to run as the party's 2007 presidential candidate, but the others in the party opposed this, believing that it was in the party's interests to back Touré. Tall and Bah were each suspended from the party's steering committee by supporters of their rival, and both of them claimed that the suspension decisions against them were taken by small groups surrounding their rival. Bah criticized Tall for allegedly considering the party to be his "private property".
