= Jean Silvandre =

Jean Silvandre (27 January 1896 in Schœlcher, Martinique – 4 February 1960) was a politician from Martinique who represented and served French Sudan in the French National Assembly from 1946-1955.

At the inception of partisan politics in the aftermath of the World War II, Jean Silvandre became the first president of the Association France-URSS, which held its first congress in Dakar, Senegal in early 1945.
