= Sudanese Union – African Democratic Rally =

Sudanese Union – African Democratic Rally Union Soudanaise-Rassemblement Démocratique Africain
- Abbreviation: US–RDA
- Leader: Mamadou Bamou Touré
- Founder: Modibo Keïta; Mamadou Konaté
- Founded: 1945; 81 years ago
- Dissolved: 2010; 16 years ago
- Succeeded by: Malian Union for the African Democratic Rally
- Headquarters: Bamako
- Ideology: African nationalism Pan-Africanism; African socialism Marxism; Marxism-Leninism
- Political position: Left-wing
- International affiliation: African Democratic Rally

The Sudanese Union – African Democratic Rally (US–RDA) (French: Union Soudanaise–Rassemblement Démocratique Africain) was a political party in Mali which existed from 1945 to 2010.

== History ==
The party was formed in 1945 by Mamadou Konaté and Modibo Keïta under the name Sudanese Bloc (Bloc Soudanais). The following year, they affiliated themselves with the African Democratic Rally (RDA), the interterritorial coalition of anti-colonial political parties active in French West Africa.

The 1957 elections saw the US-RDA win 57 of the 70 seats. Shortly after the elections, the Union of the Populations of Bandiagara merged into the US-RDA, giving it a total of 64 seats. When Konaté died in 1958, Keita gained full control of the party.

The 1959 elections saw the US-RDA win all 80 seats in the Legislative Assembly, and it became the sole legal party the following year. Elections were held in 1964, but with no opposition, the party retained all 80 seats.

Following a coup in 1968 by Moussa Traoré, the party was banned. Over the next two decades, the US-RDA remained underground until re-emerging in 1990, when it joined the growing democratic movement against Traoré's dictatorship, becoming part of the Alliance for Democracy in Mali (ADEMA).

In the 1992 parliamentary elections, the first multi-party vote since 1959, the US-RDA won eight of the 129 seats, emerging as the third-largest party behind ADEMA (76 seats) and the National Congress for Democratic Initiative (9). The party put forward Tiéoulé Mamadou Konaté as its candidate for the 1992 presidential elections. He finished in second place in the first round of voting, but was beaten by ADEMA's Alpha Oumar Konaré in the run-off by 69% to 31%.

The May 1997 presidential elections saw the party nominate Seydou Kouyate as its candidate, but he finished sixth with just 1.6% of the vote. The party boycotted the July 1997 parliamentary elections, following the annulment of the April 1997 elections.

In 1998 the party split into two factions, one of which followed Daba Diawara to become the Independence, Democracy and Solidarity Party (PIDS) in 2001. The US-RDA contested the 2002 parliamentary elections as part of the Convergence for Alternation and Change alliance, which won 10 seats.

The party joined the Alliance for Democracy and Progress for the 2007 parliamentary elections. The alliance won 113 seats, of which the US-RDA took one.

In August 2010 it merged with the Bloc for Democracy and African Integration to form the Malian Union for the African Democratic Rally.

== Electoral history ==
=== Presidential elections ===
Election	Party candidate	Votes	%	Result
1992	Baba Hakib Haidara	76,840	7.0%	Lost ✗
1997	Seydou Kouyate	26,565	1.6%	Lost ✗
2002	Did not Participate			
2007	Did not Participate			

=== National Assembly elections ===
Election	Party leader	Votes	%	Seats	+/–	Position
1946–47	Modibo Keïta		100%	2 / 30	▲2	▲3rd
1952	Modibo Keïta	101,902	100%	13 / 40	▲11	▲2nd
1957	Modibo Keïta	435,976	62.14%	57 / 70	▲44	▲1st
1959	Modibo Keïta	515,869	76.0%	80 / 80	▲23	1st
1964	Modibo Keïta	2,106,788	99.0%	80 / 80	1st	1st
1979	One-party state rule from 1976 to 1991					
1982	One-party state rule from 1976 to 1991					
1985	One-party state rule from 1976 to 1991					
1988	One-party state rule from 1976 to 1991					
1992	Mamadou Bamou Touré	172,998	17.6%	8 / 129	▲8	▲2nd
1997 (Apr)	Mamadou Bamou Touré	126,271	7.83%	Invalidated		2nd
1997 (Jul)	Mamadou Bamou Touré	Boycotted		0 / 147	▼8	
2002	Mamadou Bamou Touré	as part of CFAAC		10 / 160	▲10	▲3rd
2007	Mamadou Bamou Touré	as part of AFDAP		1 / 160	▼9	▼12th
