= Mamadou Konaté =

Malian-French politician (1897–1956)

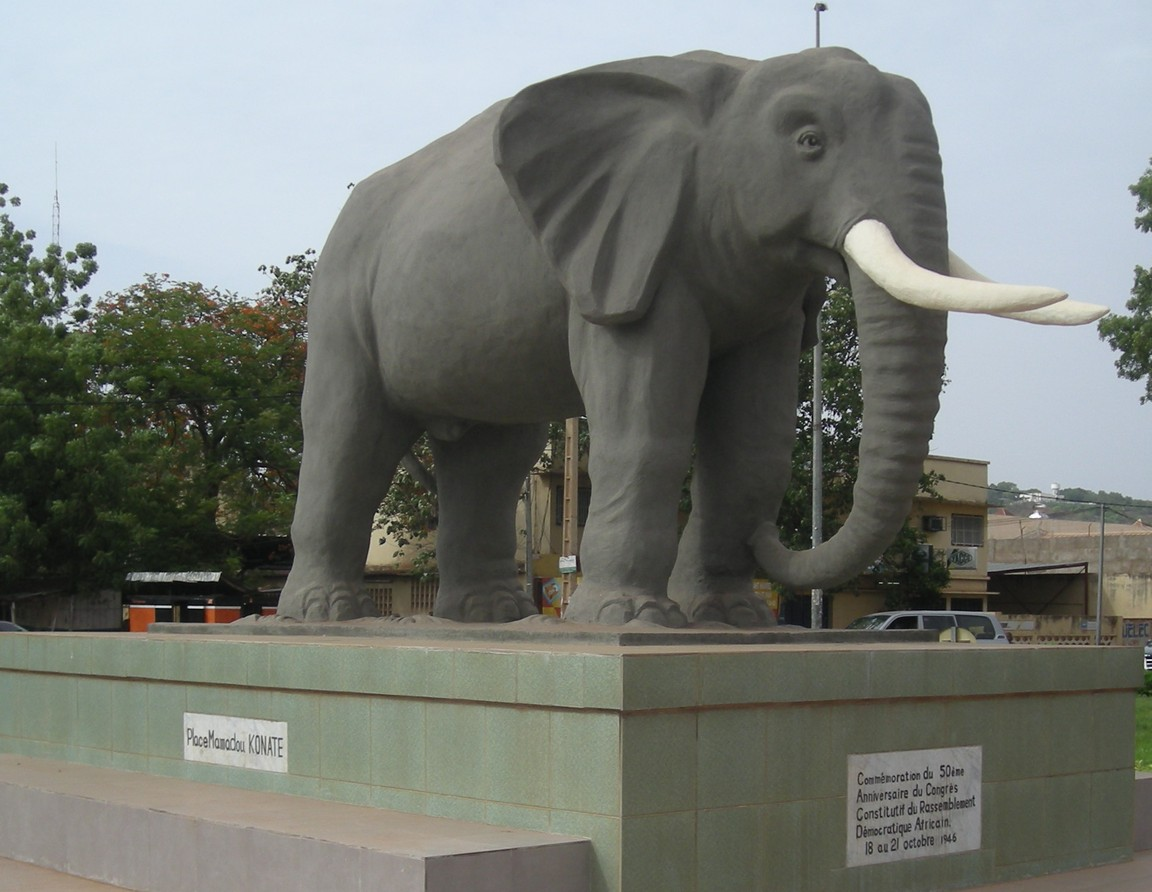
Mamadou Konaté monument in Bamako

Mamadou Konate (1897 in Kati, Mali – May 11, 1956 in Bamako) was a politician from Mali who served in the French National Assembly from 1946-1956. The 10,000-capacity Stade Mamadou Konaté, a football stadium in Bamako, is named after him.
