= Alliance for Democracy and Progress (Mali) =

The Alliance for Democracy and Progress (French: Alliance pour la démocratie et le progrès) was an alliance of political parties in Mali, that supported president Amadou Toumani Touré. In the 1 July and 22 July 2007 Malian parliamentary elections, the member parties of the alliance won 113 out of 160 seats.
