= Tiébilé Dramé =

Malian politician (1955–2025)

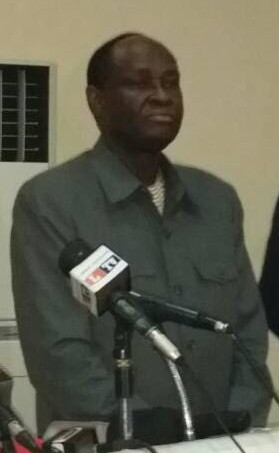

Minister of Foreign Affairs and International Cooperation
- In office July 1985 – 13 April 1989
- President: Ibrahim Boubacar Keïta
- Prime Minister: Boubou Cissé
- Preceded by: Kamissa Camara
- Succeeded by: Zeïni Moulaye

Member of the National Assembly
- In office July 1997 – 2002
- Constituency: Nioro du Sahel

Minister of Arid and Semi-Arid Zones
- In office 25 July 1996 – 1997
- President: Alpha Oumar Konaré
- Prime Minister: Ibrahim Boubacar Keïta

Minister of Foreign Affairs and Malians Abroad
- In office 27 December 1991 – 1992
- President: Amadou Toumani Touré
- Prime Minister: Soumana Sacko
- Preceded by: Souleymane Sidibé
- Succeeded by: Mohamed Aloussine Touré

Personal details
- Born: 9 June 1955 Nioro du Sahel, French Sudan, French West Africa (now Mali)
- Died: 12 August 2025 (aged 70) Paris, France
- Resting place: Faladié Cemetery, Bamako
- Party: National Congress for Democratic Initiative (until 1995); Party for National Rebirth (after 1995)
- Spouse: Kadiatou Konaré
- Children: 12
- Education: École Normale Supérieure de Bamako; Paris 1 Panthéon-Sorbonne University

Tiébilé Dramé (9 June 1955 – 12 August 2025) was a Malian politician and diplomat who served as Minister of Foreign Affairs from 1991 to 1992 and again from 2019 until the 2020 Malian coup d'état. Born in Nioro du Sahel, he became a student activist in Bamako against the regime of dictator Moussa Traoré and was elected secretary general of the National Union of Students and Pupils of Mali in 1978. He was arrested and imprisoned several times between 1977 and 1980, and went into exile in Europe in 1981. He earned a degree in African history at Paris 1 Panthéon-Sorbonne University and worked for Amnesty International in London as a researcher investigating human rights abuses in West Africa.

After Traoré's overthrow in the 1991 Malian coup d'état, Dramé returned from exile and served as Mali's foreign minister from 1991 to 1992 in the transitional government of President Amadou Toumani Touré. In 1992, he founded Le Républicain, a leading independent daily newspaper. In 1995, he founded the Party for National Rebirth, which he would lead until his death. Between 1996 and 1997, he served as Minister of Arid and Semi-Arid Zones, and in 1997 was elected to the National Assembly for his home constituency of Nioro du Sahel. He ran unsuccessfully in the 2002 and 2007 presidential elections.

In the 1990s and 2000s, Dramé led diplomatic and human rights missions to Haiti, Burundi, Madagascar on behalf of the United Nations. Following the 2012 Tuareg rebellion, Dramé was appointed to lead negotiations between the Malian government and separatist rebels in the north, resulting in a ceasefire that enabled the 2013 Malian presidential election to proceed. In 2019, following a political agreement between the Malian government and opposition groups, Dramé was named foreign minister in Prime Minister Boubou Cissé's cabinet under President Ibrahim Boubacar Keïta. He served until Keïta's overthrow in the August 2020 coup d'état. Dramé was a leading advocate for democracy and human rights in Mali, and was known for his attentiveness to the issues of Mali's underdeveloped and restive north.

== Early life, education, and activism ==
Tiébilé Dramé was born on 9 June 1955 in Nioro du Sahel, to a Soninke-speaking family in what was then the colony of French Sudan. He was the son of Sékou Dramé, a long-haul truck driver, and Fatoumata Traoré. He studied at the Lycée de Badalabougou in Bamako, where he first became drawn to activism, inspired by anti-colonialist literature, including the magazine Afrique Asie. Dramé recalled of his school years at Badalabougou, "We wrote pamphlets, points of view that we displayed at school... It was the time of the struggle for independence of the peoples of southern Africa, particularly the Portuguese colonies."

In 1976 or 1977, Dramé entered the École Normale Supérieure de Bamako to study modern literature, soon becoming involved in student activism. He progressed to the point of writing his doctoral thesis, which was almost finished, before becoming "caught up in politics" and leaving his studies in June 1980. At the time, the authoritarian regime of President Moussa Traoré was undertaking efforts to depoliticize Malian schools, creating "Open Air Cultural Committees" to replace the Sudanese Union – African Democratic Rally youth committees established by the previous one-party state led by President Modibo Keïta. Dramé, along with other student activists, opposed Traoré's efforts, and campaigned successfully to become secretary general of the school's student association.

As a student activist leader Dramé made efforts to "politicize the school movement", organizing student conferences, film screenings, debates, poetry recitals, sports events, and theatre troupes that performed satires of the ruling regime. During this time, Dramé also became involved with the Malian Labour Party, which was active in student circles. After attending the funeral and carrying the coffin of Mali's first president, Modibo Keïta, who died in prison in May 1977, Dramé was arrested and was imprisoned for several months.

On 27 December 1978, Dramé was elected secretary general of the National Union of Students and Pupils of Mali (UNEEM). After graduating from the École Normale Supérieure, he became a teacher and trade unionist in Bamako. In 1980, after the death by torture of his successor as UNEEM leader, Abdoul Karim Camara, Dramé was arrested and imprisoned in the country's north. By age 26, he had spent time in four different Malian prisons, including in Bamako, Ménaka, Talataye, and Boureissa. At one point, he was tortured while imprisoned in Bamako, according to his son. Designated by Amnesty International as a "prisoner of conscience", Dramé was released in 1981.

Upon his release from prison, Dramé went into exile in Europe, first going to Paris in June 1981. There, he studied at Paris 1 Panthéon-Sorbonne University, earning an advanced degree in African history in 1983. Between 1988 and 1991, he worked in London as a researcher for Amnesty International, where he investigated human rights violations in West Africa. During his decade of exile in Europe, he was involved in African diaspora groups and was an activist for migrants, laborers, and the anti-apartheid movement. He embraced Pan-Africanism, inspired by the ideas of Modibo Keïta, Kwame Nkrumah, and Ahmed Sékou Touré. He was active in the Union de lutte Tiémoko Garan Kouyaté (ULTGK), a clandestine political network, and served as a coordinator for the National Congress for Democratic Initiative (CNID) pro-democracy party abroad.

== Political career ==
=== Return from exile ===
Dramé returned to Mali in 1991 after the overthrow of the Moussa Traoré regime in a coup d'état led by army officer Amadou Toumani Touré. He quickly became an active player in the country's nascent democratic politics, and was considered a leading member of the CNID. From 27 December 1991 until 1992, Dramé served as foreign minister in the transitional government that was set up following the coup. He was also given the portfolio of the Ministry of Malians Abroad. In 1992, he founded Le Républicain, an outspoken, independent newspaper that soon became one of Mali's leading dailies. After leaving the government in the spring of 1992, Dramé briefly rejoined Amnesty International in London. In December 1994, he led a mission to Nigeria to investigate government repression and abuses in Ogoniland, where nine activists had been hanged in the previous month. In 1995, Dramé traveled on human rights observation missions to Haiti and Burundi with the United Nations.

That same year, he broke with the CNID over disagreements with its leader, Mountaga Tall, and helped establish the Party for National Rebirth (PARENA), becoming its secretary general. PARENA aligned itself with President Alpha Oumar Konaré's Alliance for Democracy in Mali (ADEMA) and joined the ruling coalition. In a cabinet reshuffle on 25 July 1996, Dramé was named Minister of Arid and Semi-Arid Zones under Prime Minister Ibrahim Boubacar Keïta, a position he held until 1997. In this role, he gave substance to what was initially an "empty shell" of a ministry, in the words of former Malian government minister Djiguiba Keïta. Dramé became attentive to the issues of Mali's neglected and restive north, where he had been imprisoned in his youth, overseeing a number of development projects in the region.

=== Parliamentary career and presidential runs ===
In the July 1997 parliamentary election, Dramé was elected to the National Assembly on the PARENA ticket for his home constituency of Nioro du Sahel. With eight deputies elected, PARENA came second in the election, though still far behind ADEMA, which had 128 deputies. He served as a deputy until 2002. In 1999, Dramé became president of PARENA, a position he held until his death. He was the elected chair of the inter-parliamentary committee of the West African Economic and Monetary Union (UEMOA) from 2001 to 2002. Dramé ran as PARENA's candidate in the 2002 presidential election, finishing in fourth place with 3.99% of the vote, behind Amadou Toumani Touré, Soumaïla Cissé, and Ibrahim Boubacar Keïta, but ahead of Mountaga Tall. From 2003 to 2005, he served as president of the preparatory committee of the 23rd Africa–France Summit, for which he was awarded Officer of the Legion of Honour by French president Jacques Chirac on 14 July 2006.

On 18 February 2007, Dramé was nominated as PARENA's candidate for the April 2007 presidential election. According to the official results, incumbent president Amadou Toumani Touré won in a landslide, while Dramé placed third with 3.04% of the vote. Though the election was described as "free, fair, and credible" by the ECOWAS observer mission, Dramé, along with the Front for Democracy and the Republic, a coalition that included him and three other presidential candidates, alleged fraud and called for the results to be annulled. Dramé claimed that polls were flooded with pre-marked ballots in support of Touré, and that government officials "were ordered" to travel to their home communities to influence votes in favor of Touré. The government responded that it was "waiting for proof" that the election was rigged, and had "only heard accusations that are not based on any specific facts". Dramé's attempt to run in the July 2007 parliamentary election three months later was blocked by the Constitutional Court, which invalidated his candidacy on the grounds that he had multiple birth certificates.

=== Separatist negotiations and 2013 ceasefire ===
Dramé became a United Nations envoy to Madagascar during the country's 2009 political crisis. In 2011, he was involved in negotiations in Libya with the National Transitional Council. Dramé was critical of the March 2012 Malian coup d'état, denouncing the "climate of intimidation and fear" it had created in the country. In 2013, interim president Dioncounda Traoré appointed Dramé as Mali's chief envoy in negotiations with the National Movement for the Liberation of Azawad (MNLA), a Tuareg separatist group which had launched a rebellion the previous year in the country's north, preventing national elections from taking place. Dramé led talks in Ouagadougou, Burkina Faso, between the Malian government, the MNLA, and the High Council for the Unity of Azawad (HCUA), resulting in the June 2013 Ouagadougou Agreement, which provided for a ceasefire that enabled Mali's June 2013 presidential election and November 2013 parliamentary election to proceed. Dramé, recognizing the weakness of the Malian Armed Forces, supported the French Army's intervention to rout the advancing Islamist rebels, putting him at odds with growing anti-French sentiments in the region at the time. After the treaty, he continued to support negotiations with the Tuareg rebels, believing the Malian government would never be able to bring about a permanent end to the conflict through force.

Dramé was initially the PARENA candidate in the 2013 presidential election, but withdrew on 17 June 2013, before the first round of voting, stating that "there will be no credible election". He strongly criticized France for pressuring Mali's government not to delay the vote, despite insufficient preparation. He specifically highlighted the situation in Kidal, a town recently recaptured from rebels, where an updated electoral roll had not yet been prepared, despite the election being only days away—a violation of Malian electoral law. Still, Dramé did not call for a boycott of the vote, and went on to support Union for the Republic and Democracy candidate Soumaïla Cissé. Dramé supported the Algiers Accords, a peace deal signed in 2015 between the Malian government and the Tuareg separatist Coordination of Azawad Movements. In 2017, he was a leading figure in the Antè Abana movement, a coalition of political and civil society groups opposed to President Ibrahim Boubacar Keïta's constitutional reform efforts.

=== Foreign minister and 2020 coup d'état ===
Dramé was chosen to manage Cissé's campaign in the 2018 presidential election, in which he placed second to incumbent President Ibrahim Boubacar Keïta. On 5 May 2019, the new prime minister, Boubou Cissé, formed a new cabinet following a political agreement signed three days earlier between the ruling party and some segments of the opposition. Dramé was named Minister of Foreign Affairs and International Cooperation, replacing Kamissa Camara. He conducted his first foreign trip in the same month, a mini-tour to Europe from May 14 to 16. He visited Brussels, where he took part in a summit focused on security in the Sahel, and Paris, where he met French foreign minister Jean-Yves Le Drian. Dramé served as foreign minister until President Keïta was overthrown in the 18 August 2020 coup d'état by elements of the Malian army. Dramé was reportedly arrested during the coup, along with other key government officials.

Following the 2020 coup, Dramé initially withdrew from a public role in politics, but his party, PARENA, was highly critical of transitional government's leadership in the areas of security and institutional reform. Dramé denounced the new regime's "establishment of a climate of intolerance and attacks of fundamental democratic freedoms", and called for the government to reform the electoral system and hold elections. He also raised alarms about Mali's diplomatic isolation in the wake of the coup—having been suspended from the African Union, ECOWAS, the African Growth and Opportunity Act, and European Union budgetary aid—and urged the government to work to quickly rectify the situation. Towards the end of his life, he experienced illness and did not frequently speak publicly about politics.

== Death and legacy ==
Dramé died of stomach cancer in a hospital in Paris on 12 August 2025, at the age of 70. His funeral was held three days later, on August 15, at the Magnambougou football field in Bamako. It was attended by Dramé's family, his former political comrades, diplomats, and journalists. Among those present were former president (and Dramé's father-in-law) Alpha Oumar Konaré and former transitional president Dioncounda Traoré, former prime ministers Ousmane Issoufi Maïga and Modibo Sidibé, and foreign delegations from Burkina Faso, Niger, and Senegal, including Senegalese former minister Abdoulaye Bathily. In a funeral speech, PARENA secretary general and former youth and sports minister Djiguiba Keïta described Dramé as "the baobab tree of the resistance to military dictatorship in Mali". He was buried in the Faladié cemetery on the outskirts of Bamako. No members of the ruling transitional government attended the funeral—"an institutional silence that contrasts with the national stature of the deceased", in the words of the Mali Tribune.

Dramé, a leading figure in Malian politics for decades, was a strong advocate for free and fair elections, transparency, national reconciliation, and strengthening of democratic institutions. He was particularly noted for his expertise in and attentiveness to the issues of Mali's north. After the announcement of his death, tributes poured in from Mali and the world. Former foreign minister of Niger Hassoumi Massaoudou wrote on Twitter that Dramé "passionately loved Mali, his country, and Africa. Throughout his life, Tiébile fought for freedom, democracy, enlightenment, and humanist ideas." El-Ghassim Wane, the former head of the UN's MINUSMA peacekeeping force in Mali, tweeted that "With his passing, Mali and Africa have lost a tireless defender of the democratic ideal and human rights."

The New York Times described Dramé as "a rare outspoken voice for democracy and human rights in West Africa" whose "frankness more often than not earned him exclusion from the inner circle of his country’s troubled politics". Two former Radio France Internationale Africa correspondents wrote that Dramé "was a free man, and he fought for it". Dramé was "a man of conviction, a defender of democracy and the Republic" who "will be remembered for his commitment to dialogue, peace, and justice", according to DW News. The Agence de Presse Africaine wrote that Dramé's "political legacy will be marked by his role as a defender of human rights, freedom of expression, and democracy in a country facing institutional challenges." Mali 24, a local outlet, described him as "a prominent and often controversial figure" and "a tireless activist for democracy and human rights."

== Personal life ==
On 3 March 2005, Dramé married Kadiatou Konaré, 20 years his junior, a publisher and former minister of culture and the daughter of former Malian president Alpha Oumar Konaré. They had 12 children: Fodé Maciré, Mamadou, Fatoumata, Maïmouna, Abdoulaye, Zeinabou, twins Aminata Kadia and Ouleymatou Nandy, Badiallo, Oumou, Alpha Oumar, and Adame; as well as 12 grandchildren at the time of his death.

Following the 2020 coup, Dramé continued to live in Bamako.
