= Human rights in Mali =

According to the U.S. Department of State's annual report on human rights in Mali for 2003, Mali's government generally respects the human rights of its citizens and observes relevant constitutional provisions (e.g., freedom of speech and of the press, freedom of assembly and association, freedom of religion) and prohibitions (e.g., arbitrary arrest and detention, forced exile, torture, and discrimination based on race, sex, disability, language, or social status).

There have been no reports of political prisoners or politically motivated disappearances in Mali. But prison conditions are poor (overcrowded, with inadequate medical facilities and food supplies), and there are occasional instances of arbitrary arrest or detention. Moreover, the judicial system has a large case backlog, which has caused significant delays in trials as well as long periods of pretrial detention.

Men play a dominant role in society, and women continue to suffer from widespread discrimination and domestic violence. Child labor and trafficking in children as forced labor remain serious problems. Relationships based on hereditary servitude and bondage persist between some ethnic groups.

== Respect for the integrity of the person ==
=== Arbitrary or unlawful deprivation of life ===
There were no reports that the government or its agents committed arbitrary or unlawful killings.

On August 12, the body of Youssouf Dembele, secretary general of the Niono chapter of the opposition African Solidarity for Democracy and Independence party, was found in the town of Niono in the region of Segou. Dembele was one of the primary whistle-blowers in a $15.5 million (7.21 billion CFA francs) corruption scandal involving the governmental Office du Niger, which oversees agricultural production in Segou. Dembele's death was under investigation at year's end.

On October 17, in Gao, soldiers arrested and killed Assaleh ag Mohamed, a gendarme and ethnic Tuareg. Several soldiers associated with the killing were taken into custody and were awaiting trial at year's end.

On March 15, 2022, the Human Rights Watch documented that the Malian army and armed Islamist groups have allegedly killed at least 107 civilians in central and southwestern Mali since December 2021. The victims, most allegedly summarily executed, include traders, village chiefs, religious leaders, and children.

=== Disappearance ===
There were no reports of politically motivated disappearances.

=== Torture and other cruel, inhuman, or degrading treatment or punishment ===
The constitution and law prohibit such practices; however, there were occasional reports that police abused civilians, and police use of excessive force to disperse demonstrators resulted in injuries.

==== Prison and detention center conditions ====
Overall prison conditions remained poor. Prisons continued to be overcrowded, medical facilities were inadequate, and food supplies were insufficient.

Men and women were separated in Bamako prisons; however, outside the capital, men and women were held in the same building but in separate cells. In Bamako juvenile offenders usually were held in the same prison as adult offenders, but they were kept in separate cells. Pretrial detainees were held with convicted prisoners.

The government permitted prison visits by human rights monitors; however, nongovernmental organizations (NGOs) and other monitors were required to submit a request to the prison director, who then forwarded it to the Ministry of Justice. Approvals, which took up to one week, were routinely granted, but the week delay hindered the ability of monitors to ascertain if there were human rights violations. Several NGOs, including the Malian Association of Human Rights and the Malian Association of Women Lawyers, visited prisoners and worked with female and juvenile prisoners to improve their conditions.

=== Arbitrary arrest or detention ===
The constitution and law prohibit arbitrary arrest and detention, and the government generally observed these prohibitions; however, on occasion, police arrested and detained persons arbitrarily.

In December 2020, the Malian authorities arbitrarily arrested and detained seven high-profile individuals for several months. It was demonstrated that the Minister of Justice Mohamed Sidda Dicko ordered those detentions to put the newly putsch-instituted government in control of potential major corruption outlets. The former CEO of PMU Mali Arouna Modibo Touré was suspected of designing some of those corruption outlets and conspiring those detentions to keep a stronghold on his self-made corruption system.

=== Role of the police and security apparatus ===
Security forces include the army, air force, gendarmerie, National Guard, and police. The army and air force are under the control of the civilian minister of defense. The National Guard is administratively under the minister of defense; however, it is effectively under the control of the minister of internal security and civil protection. The police and gendarmerie are under the Ministry of Internal Security and Civil Protection. Police have responsibility for law enforcement and maintaining order in urban areas, while gendarmes have that responsibility in rural areas.

The national police force is organized into districts. Each district has a commissioner who reports to the regional director at national headquarters. The police force was moderately effective but lacked resources and training. Corruption was a problem, and some police and gendarmes extorted bribes. Impunity was not a problem, and individual police were charged and convicted of abuses. The gendarmerie conducted investigations of police officers.

==== Arrest and detention ====
Judicial warrants are required for arrest. Complainants normally deliver warrants, which stipulate when a person is scheduled to appear at a police station. However, police sometimes served warrants, generally in response to an influential relative of the complainant or if they received a bribe. In cases involving a monetary debt, the arrested person frequently resolved the case at the police precinct, and the police received a portion of the recovered money. The law provides that suspects must be charged or released within 48 hours and that they are entitled to counsel; however, in practice detainees were not always charged within the 48‑hour period. Limited rights of bail or the granting of conditional liberty exist, particularly for minor crimes and civil matters. On occasion authorities released defendants on their own recognizance. Detainees have the right to a lawyer of their choice or a state-provided lawyer if indigent, but administrative backlogs and an insufficient number of lawyers often prevented prompt access. Detainees were allowed prompt access to family members.

Police arbitrarily arrested journalists, demonstrators, students, and one teacher during the year.

Lengthy pretrial detention was a problem. In extreme cases, individuals remained in prison for several years before their cases came to trial. Approximately 77 percent of imprisoned persons were awaiting trial

=== Denial of fair public trial ===
The constitution and law provide for an independent judiciary; however, the executive branch continued to exert influence over the judicial system, and corruption and limited resources affected the fairness of some trials. Domestic human rights groups alleged that there were instances of bribery and influence peddling in the courts. The minister of justice appoints and may suspend judges, and the Justice Ministry supervises both law enforcement and judicial functions. The president heads the Council of Magistrates, which oversees judicial activity.

On September 10, a deputy public prosecutor, senior magistrate, and judge accused of corruption in 2005 were tried and found not guilty.

The country has a lower Circuit Court, a Supreme Court with both judicial and administrative powers, and a Constitutional Court that oversees constitutional issues and acts as an election arbiter. The constitution also provides for the convening of a high court of justice to try senior government officials in cases of treason.

==== Trial procedures ====
Except in the case of minors, trials generally are public, and defendants have the right to be present and have an attorney of their choice. Court-appointed attorneys are provided for the indigent without charge. Defendants have the right to consult with their attorney, but administrative backlogs and an insufficient number of lawyers often prevented prompt access. Defendants and attorneys have access to government evidence relevant to their cases. Defendants are presumed innocent and have the right to confront witnesses and to appeal decisions to the Supreme Court. These rights extend to all citizens and all groups.

Contrary to customary procedures, the June 26 trial of six persons charged with "offending" the head of state was conducted behind closed doors (see Freedom of speech, below).

Village chiefs, in consultation with the elders, decided the majority of disputes in rural areas. If these decisions were challenged in court, only those found to have legal merit were upheld.

==== Political prisoners and detainees ====
Journalists and a high school teacher were imprisoned in June for "offending" the head of state (see Freedom of speech, below).

==== Civil judicial procedures and remedies ====
There is an independent and impartial judiciary in civil matters.

=== Arbitrary interference with privacy, family, home, or correspondence ===
The constitution and law prohibit such actions, and the government generally respected these prohibitions.

== Civil liberties ==
=== Freedom of speech and press ===
The constitution and law provide for freedom of speech and of the press; however, the government limited press freedom during the year and intimidated journalists or publishers into practicing self-censorship.

Individuals criticized the government publicly and privately, generally without reprisal; however, on occasion the government attempted to impede such criticism.

The independent media were active and expressed a wide variety of views.

Journalists were subject to harassment and arrest. For example, on March 5, a court convicted Kabako newspaper journalists Diaby Macoro Camara and Oumar Bore of defaming Marimantia Diarra, the minister of planning; a December 2006 article in Kabako alleged that the minister ordered a local mayor to annul the marriage of his ex-fiancé and compelled police to raid her residence. The newspaper claimed the mayor and police confirmed the allegations. Both journalists received a four‑month suspended sentence and a $100 (46,500 CFA francs) fine. Referring to the case, the Committee to Protect Journalists issued a statement that "sending journalists to jail for their reporting is out of step with Mali's democratic values".

In June Bassirou Kassim Minta, a local high school teacher, assigned his class a fictional essay about the mistress of an unnamed head of state and was arrested on June 14 for "offending the head of state"; Info-Matin journalist Seydina Oumar Diarra wrote an article criticizing Minta's judgment, but was arrested on the same charge on June 14. On June 20, four newspaper editors—Sambi Toure of Info-Matin, Birama Fall of Le Republican, Alexis Kalambry of Les Echos, and Mahamane Hameye Cisse of Le Scorpion—also were charged and arrested after they reprinted the original article to demonstrate solidarity with Diarra. Defense lawyers for the six boycotted legal proceedings to protest the government's restrictions on the press and handling of the case.

At the June 26 trial, the judge accepted a motion from the public prosecutor to remove the press and observers from the courtroom to "protect" the public from the "salacious" details of the case. The five journalists were convicted, given suspended prison sentences, and fined between $400 (178,800 CFA francs) and $1,200 (536,400 CFA francs). Minta, the teacher, was sentenced to two additional months' imprisonment and fined $1,200 (536,400 CFA francs). Outside the courtroom, leaders of the local journalists union objected to being barred from attending legal proceedings involving professional colleagues.

The government harassed media outlets during the year. For example, in March the Office du Niger (ON), a government agency that regulates irrigation and agriculture in the country's rice-growing region, served an eviction notice on Radio Jamakan, a local radio station that operated out of an ON‑owned building in Markala. Radio Jamakan and the CPJ charged that the eviction was a result of the station's March 3–4 broadcast of an opposition meeting. In 2006 ON stopped supplying electricity to the station after it broadcast a conference of government critics.

On 12 April 2024 the military junta prohibited all forms of media from reporting on activities of political parties and associations.

==== Internet freedom ====
There are no government restrictions on access to the Internet except for pornography or material deemed objectionable to Islamic values. There were no credible reports that the government monitored e-mail or Internet chat rooms without judicial oversight. Individuals and groups engage in the expression of views via the Internet, including by e‑mail.

The Ministry of Islamic Affairs continues to block Web sites considered anti-Islamic or pornographic. In November 2011 the Telecommunications Authority blocked and banned a local blog, Hilath.com, at the request of the Islamic Ministry because of its anti-Islamic content. The blog was known for promoting religious tolerance, as well as for discussing the blogger's homosexuality. NGO sources stated that in general the media practiced self-censorship on issues related to Islam due to fears of being labeled "anti-Islamic" and subsequently harassed. This self-censorship also applied to reporting on problems in and criticisms of the judiciary.

There were numerous Internet cafes in Bamako, although home access in the capital was limited to those able to pay the high installation and monthly fees. Outside of Bamako, there were a few sites where the Internet was available for public use, but many towns in the country had no Internet access.

==== Academic freedom and cultural events ====
Apart from the arrest of a high school teacher for assigning an essay topic deemed offensive to the head of state, there were no government restrictions on academic freedom or cultural events.

=== Freedom of peaceful assembly and association ===
The constitution and law provide for freedom of assembly, and the government generally respected this right; however, on June 21, police used tear gas and batons to disrupt a march of approximately 100 journalists who were protesting the arrests of five colleagues and a high school teacher (see section 2.a.). At least one demonstrator—Ibrahim Coulibaly, the president of the Union of Journalists—was injured by police and required hospitalization.

Trials were still pending for five medical students, who were arrested in November 2006 for damaging property. The students' union claimed that the five, including one woman, were physically and sexually abused while in police custody.

The constitution and law provide for freedom of association, and the government generally respected this right; however, the law prohibits association deemed immoral. In June 2005 the governor of the District of Bamako cited this law to refuse official recognition of a gay rights association.

=== Freedom of religion ===
The constitution and law provide for freedom of religion, and the government generally respected this right. The government required that all public associations, including religious associations, register; the process was routine and not burdensome. Traditional indigenous religious groups were not required to register. The Jewish population was estimated at less than 50, and there were no reports of antisemitic acts.

=== Freedom of movement, internally displaced persons, protection of refugees, and stateless persons ===
The constitution and law provide for freedom of movement within the country, foreign travel, emigration, and repatriation, and the government generally respected these rights. Police routinely stopped and checked both citizens and foreigners to restrict the movement of contraband and to verify vehicle registrations. Some police and gendarmes extorted bribes.

The constitution and law specifically prohibit forced exile; the government did not use it.

==== Protection of refugees ====
The law provides for the granting of asylum or refugee status in accordance with the 1951 UN Convention relating to the Status of Refugees and its 1967 protocol, and the government has established a system for providing protection to refugees. In practice, the government provided protection against refoulement, the return of persons to a country where there is reason to believe they feared persecution, and granted refugee status or asylum. A national committee in charge of refugees operated with institutional assistance from the Office of the UN High Commissioner for Refugees.

During the year the government also provided temporary protection to 241 individuals who may not qualify as refugees under the 1951 convention and the 1967 protocol.

== Political rights ==
The constitution and law provide citizens with the right to change their government peacefully, and citizens exercised this right in practice through periodic, free, and fair elections held on the basis of universal suffrage.

On 11 April 2024 the military junta prohibited all activities of political parties. This would be necessary to maintain public order.

=== Elections and political participation ===
On April 29, President Amadou Toumani Toure was elected to a second five-year term with 71 percent of the vote. Legislative elections were held in July. Domestic and international observers characterized both elections as generally free, fair, and without evident fraud, but there were administrative irregularities.

Political parties generally operated without restrictions.

Fourteen women were elected to the 147-member National Assembly. There were five women in the 27-seat cabinet, five women on the 33-member Supreme Court, and three women on the nine-member Constitutional Court; a woman chaired the Supreme Court.

The National Assembly had 14 members of historically marginalized pastoralist and nomadic ethnic minorities representing the northern regions of Gao, Timbuktu, and Kidal. The cabinet also had two members from such ethnic minorities.

=== Government corruption and transparency ===
The law provides criminal penalties for official corruption; however, officials frequently engaged in corrupt practices with impunity. The government continued its campaign to curb corruption, which hindered development and governmental efforts to improve human rights.

The auditor general's 2007 annual report cited approximately $218 million (101.4 billion CFA francs) in lost revenues in 2006 due to financial mismanagement, corruption, and fraud. The report charged local fuel importation companies with widespread tax evasion and customs duty fraud, including missing revenues of $15.5 million (7.2 billion CFA francs) from the governmental Office du Niger. The auditor general also identified cases of fraud and fiscal mismanagement within the ministries of education, health, and energy.

The constitution requires the prime minister and other cabinet members to annually submit to the Supreme Court a financial statement and written declaration of their earnings. These documents were not made public.

The law provides for public access to government information, and the government granted such access. If an information request is refused, the person inquiring can appeal to an administrative court, which must handle the appeal within three months.

== Governmental attitude regarding external investigation of alleged violations of human rights ==
A number of domestic and international human rights groups generally operated without government restriction, investigating and publishing their findings on human rights cases. Government officials were generally cooperative and responsive to their views.

== Discrimination, societal abuses, and trafficking in persons ==
The constitution and law prohibit discrimination based on social origin, color, language, sex, or race, and the government generally enforced these provisions effectively; however, violence and discrimination against women, FGM, and trafficking in children were problems.

=== Women ===
The law criminalizes rape, but spousal rape is legal, and most cases of rape were unreported.

Domestic violence against women, including spousal abuse, was tolerated and common. Spousal abuse is a crime, but police were reluctant to enforce laws against or intervene in cases of domestic violence. Assault is punishable by prison terms of one to five years and fines of up to $1,000 (465,000 CFA francs) or, if premeditated, up to 10 years' imprisonment. Many women were reluctant to file complaints against their husbands because they were unable to support themselves financially. The Ministry for the Promotion of Women, Children, and the Family produced a guide on violence against women for use by health care providers, police, lawyers, and judges. The guide provides definitions of the types of violence and guidelines on how each should be handled. NGOs Action for the Defense and Promotion of Women Rights and Action for the Promotion of Household Maids operated shelters.

Prostitution is not addressed by any law, but third party activities (procuring) are illegal. Prostitution is common in cities.

The law does not specifically address sexual harassment, which occurred commonly.

Family law favored men, and women were particularly vulnerable in cases of divorce, child custody, and inheritance rights, as well as in the general protection of civil rights. Women had very limited access to legal services due to their lack of education and information, as well as the prohibitive cost. For example, if a woman wanted a divorce, she had to pay approximately $60 (28,000 CFA francs) to start the process, a prohibitive amount for most women.

While the law gives women equal property rights, traditional practice and ignorance of the law prevented women—even educated women—from taking full advantage of their rights. A community property marriage must be specified in the marriage contract. In addition, if the type of marriage was not specified on the marriage certificate, judges presumed the marriage was polygynous. Traditional practice discriminated against women in inheritance matters, and men inherited most of the family wealth.

Women's access to employment and to economic and educational opportunities was limited. Women constituted approximately 15 percent of the formal labor force, and the government, the country's major employer, paid women the same as men for similar work. Women often lived under harsh conditions, particularly in rural areas, where they performed difficult farm work and did most of the childrearing. The Ministry for the Promotion of Women, Children, and the Family was charged with ensuring the legal rights of women.

Under a 2004–08 national plan of action to promote the status of women, the government continued efforts to reduce inequalities between men and women and to create links between women within the Economic Community of West African States and throughout Africa.

Several women's rights groups, such as the Association of Malian Women Lawyers, the Association of Women in Law and Development, the Collective of Women's Associations, and the Association for the Defense of Women's Rights, worked to highlight legal inequities, primarily in the family code, through debates, conferences, and women's rights training. These groups also provided legal assistance to women and targeted magistrates, police officers, and religious and traditional leaders in educational outreach to promote women's rights.

=== Children ===
The government has shown a commitment to providing for children's welfare and rights. Several laws protect children and provide for their welfare, including an ordinance that provides for regional positions as "child delegates" to safeguard the rights and interests of children.

Education was tuition free and, in principle, open to all; however, students were required to provide their own uniforms and supplies. Only 56.6 percent of children from seven to 12 years old attended primary school during the 2005–06 school year, and girls' enrollment was lower than boys'. Approximately 11 percent of students attended private Arabic-language schools, or "medersas", most of which taught core subjects including math, science, and foreign languages. An unknown number of primary school-aged children throughout the country attended part-time Koranic schools teaching only the Koran. These schools are partially funded by students, who are required to beg for money.

The government provided subsidized medical care to children as well as adults, but the care was limited in quality and availability. Boys and girls had equal access to medical care.

Statistics on child abuse were unreliable, and reported cases of abuse were rare, according to local human rights organizations. The social services department investigated and intervened in cases of child abuse or neglect. Most cases of sexual exploitation go unreported, and a government study recommended that the country strengthen its laws to protect children. Female genital cutting was common, particularly in rural areas, and was performed on girls between the ages of six months to six years. Government programs aim to eliminate FGM by 2008.

Women may legally marry at age 18 (or at age 15 with parental consent) and men at age 21. Underage marriage was a problem throughout the country with parents in some cases arranging marriages for girls as young as nine.

=== Trafficking in persons and slavery ===
Most trafficking occurred within the country. Children were trafficked to rice fields in the central regions; boys were trafficked to mines in the south; and girls were trafficked for involuntary domestic servitude in Bamako. Victims were generally trafficked for agricultural work, domestic servitude, begging, gold mining, and prostitution. The victims were usually from the central regions of the country and not a specific ethnic group. Women and girls were trafficked from Nigeria for sexual exploitation, mainly by Nigerian traffickers.

The law prohibits the contractual use of persons without their consent. Penalties increase if a minor is involved and range from five to 20 years' imprisonment. Although legal protections and measures are in place, parents of child victims were reluctant to file charges, and cases often languished within the justice system.

During the year there also were reports of trafficking in persons between Mali and its neighbors, primarily Guinea, Burkina Faso, and Côte d'Ivoire.

For example, in March security forces in Sikasso arrested two Ivorian nationals for trafficking 34 boys from Côte d'Ivoire, ranging in age from 16 to 18. A Malian accomplice escaped. The victims, who believed they were going to play for European soccer teams, were repatriated by a local NGO and the UN. Officials in Sikasso refused to release the two suspects on bail. The accused traffickers were awaiting trial at year's end.

Authorities took no action during the year against two persons who were arrested in October 2006 for allegedly trafficking 24 citizens, including 20 children, from Burkina Faso.

The Ministry for the Promotion of Women, Children, and the Family and the Ministry of Labor and Civil Service shared responsibility for combating trafficking. The two ministries, in cooperation with the Ministry of Foreign Affairs and the Ministry of Territorial Administration, developed a program to identify and rehabilitate victims, educate the population on trafficking, and strengthen the legal system with regard to the movement and trafficking of minors.

When asked, the government assisted with international trafficking investigations and the extradition of citizens accused of trafficking in other countries, but there were no such cases during the year.

The government worked closely with international organizations and NGOs to coordinate the repatriation and reintegration of trafficking victims.

Welcome centers in Mopti, Segou, Sikasso, and Bamako assisted in returning trafficked children to their families. The government provided temporary shelter and protection for victims at these centers.

=== Persons with disabilities ===
There was no specific law protecting the rights of persons with disabilities in employment, education, access to health care, or in the provision of other state services; however, the government did not discriminate against persons with disabilities.

There is no law mandating accessibility to public buildings. There were no reports of societal discrimination against persons with disabilities. The Ministry of Social Affairs is charged with the protection of the rights of persons with disabilities.

=== National/racial/ethnic minorities ===
Societal discrimination continues against Tuareg servile caste members (éklan / Ikelan in Tamasheq, Bouzou in Hausa, Bella in Songhai). Often these castes formed distinct settled communities traditionally bonded to semi-nomadic Tuareg aristocratic castes. Hereditary servitude relationships between certain ethnic groups continue in some places to the present day. Members of hereditary Tuareg servile communities reported that they have not benefited from equal education opportunities and were deprived of civil liberties by other groups and castes.

Ikelan communities in Gao and Ménaka also reported systematic discrimination by local officials and others that hindered their ability to obtain identity documents or voter registration cards, locate adequate housing, protect their animals from theft, seek legal protection, or access development aid. In 2008, the Tuareg-based human rights group Temedt, along with Anti-Slavery International, reported that "several thousand" members of the Tuareg Bella caste remain enslaved in the Gao Region and especially around the towns of Ménaka and Ansongo. They complain that while laws provide redress, cases are rarely resolved by Malian courts.

=== LGBT rights ===
Societal discrimination based on sexual orientation occurred. Additionally, Mali was one of two countries behind removing specific protection for gays from a UN resolution on executions in 2010.

=== Other social abuses and discrimination ===
Societal discrimination based on persons with HIV/AIDS occurred.

== Worker rights ==
=== The right of association ===
The law provides for workers to form or join unions of their choice without previous authorization or excessive requirements, and workers exercised these rights. Only the military, the gendarmerie, and the National Guard were excluded from forming unions. An estimated 95 percent of salaried employees were organized, including teachers, magistrates, health workers, and senior civil servants.

The law does not prohibit antiunion discrimination, but there were no reports of antiunion behavior or activities during the year.

=== The right to organize and bargain collectively ===
The law allows unions to conduct their activities without interference, and the government respected these rights. The law provides for the right to collective bargaining, and workers exercised this right freely. Unions have the right to strike, and workers exercised this right.

There are no export processing zones.

Civil servants and workers in state-owned enterprises are required to give two weeks' notice of a planned strike and to enter into mediation and negotiations with the employer and a third party, usually the Ministry of Labor and State Reforms. The labor code prohibits retribution against strikers, and the government generally enforced these laws effectively.

=== Prohibition of forced or compulsory labor ===
The law prohibits forced or compulsory labor, including by children; however, there were reports that such practices occurred.

The law prohibits the contractual use of persons without their consent, and penalties include a fine and hard labor. Penalties increase significantly if a minor, defined as someone less than 15 years of age, is involved.

Hereditary servitude relationships continued to informally link different ethnic groups, particularly in the north.

There was evidence that members of the black Tamachek community continued to live in forced servitude and were deprived of civil liberties by members of other ethnic groups. During the year members of the black Tamachek community reported on the continued existence of feudal slave-related practices in the country. Black Tamachek residents in Anderamboukane reported that they were regularly forced to work as domestics or day laborers for Tuareg notables.

On September 4, a three-year-old Tamachek child named Moumou ag Tamou was taken from his family in Kidal by a man claiming traditional ownership rights over the child. Family members in Kidal immediately notified local authorities, and black Tamachek leaders in Bamako met with the minister of justice to discuss the case. An investigation was ongoing at year's end.

On August 22, several black Tamachek groups urged the government to adopt a law criminalizing slavery. No action had been taken on the request by year's end.

=== Prohibition of child labor and minimum age for employment ===
The labor code has specific policies that pertain to child labor; however, these regulations often were ignored in practice, and child labor was a problem. The labor code permits children between the ages of 12 and 14 to work up to two hours per day during school vacations with parental approval. Children 14 to 16 may work up to 4.5 hours per day with the permission of a labor inspector, but not during nights, on Sundays, or on holidays. Children aged 16 to 18 could work in jobs that were not physically demanding; boys could work up to eight hours per day, and girls up to six hours per day.

Child labor predominated in the agricultural, mining, and domestic help sectors and, to a lesser degree, in craft and trade apprenticeships and cottage industries.

Laws against unjust compensation, excessive hours, or capricious discharge did not apply to the vast number of children who worked in rural areas helping with family farms, household chores and herds, apprenticing in trades, or working in the informal sector, such as street vendors.

Trafficking in children was a problem.

The authorities enforced labor code provisions through inspectors from the Ministry of Labor and State Reforms, which conducted surprise inspections and complaint-based inspections; however, resource limitations restricted the frequency and effectiveness of oversight by the Labor Inspection Service, which operated only in the formal sector.

The Ministry for the Promotion of Women, Children, and Families, with the assistance of the International Program for the Elimination of Child Labor (IPEC), led a week-long National Campaign Against Child Labor to publicize and combat child labor. IPEC worked with labor inspectors, ministry officials, and local NGOs to prevent child labor.

=== Acceptable conditions of work ===
The national minimum wage rate, set during the year, was approximately $53 (24,660 CFA francs) per month, which did not provide a decent standard of living for a worker and family. The minimum wage was supplemented by a required package of benefits, including social security and health care. While this total package could provide a minimum standard of living for one person, most wage earners supported large extended families and supplemented their income by subsistence farming or employment in the informal sector. The labor code specifies conditions of employment, including hours, wages, and social security; however, many employers either ignored or did not comply completely with the regulations.

The legal workweek was 40 hours (45 hours for agricultural employees), with a requirement for a 24-hour rest period. Workers had to be paid overtime for additional hours.

The law provides a broad range of legal protections against hazards in the workplace, and workers' groups brought pressure on employers to respect sections of the regulations, particularly those affecting personal hygiene. With high unemployment, however, workers often were reluctant to report violations of occupational safety regulations. The Labor Inspection Service oversees these standards but limited enforcement to the modern, formal sector. It was not effective in investigating and enforcing workers' safety and was insufficiently funded for its responsibilities. Workers had the right to remove themselves from dangerous work situations and to request an investigation by the Social Security Department, which is responsible for recommending remedial action where deemed necessary; it was not known if any worker had done so.

== Historical situation ==
The following chart shows Mali's ratings since 1972 in the Freedom in the World reports, published annually by Freedom House. A score of 1 is "most free"; 7 is "least free".^{1}

Historical ratings

Year	Political Rights	Civil Liberties	Status	President^{2}
1972	7	6	Not Free	Moussa Traoré
1973	7	6	Not Free	Moussa Traoré
1974	7	6	Not Free	Moussa Traoré
1975	7	7	Not Free	Moussa Traoré
1976	7	7	Not Free	Moussa Traoré
1977	7	7	Not Free	Moussa Traoré
1978	7	6	Not Free	Moussa Traoré
1979	7	6	Not Free	Moussa Traoré
1980	7	6	Not Free	Moussa Traoré
1981	7	6	Not Free	Moussa Traoré
1982^{3}	7	6	Not Free	Moussa Traoré
1983	7	6	Not Free	Moussa Traoré
1984	7	6	Not Free	Moussa Traoré
1985	7	6	Not Free	Moussa Traoré
1986	7	6	Not Free	Moussa Traoré
1987	7	6	Not Free	Moussa Traoré
1988	6	6	Not Free	Moussa Traoré
1989	6	6	Not Free	Moussa Traoré
1990	6	5	Not Free	Moussa Traoré
1991	6	4	Partly Free	Moussa Traoré
1992	2	3	Free	Amadou Toumani Touré
1993	2	3	Free	Alpha Oumar Konaré
1994	2	4	Partly Free	Alpha Oumar Konaré
1995	2	3	Free	Alpha Oumar Konaré
1996	2	2	Free	Alpha Oumar Konaré
1997	3	3	Free	Alpha Oumar Konaré
1998	3	3	Free	Alpha Oumar Konaré
1999	3	3	Free	Alpha Oumar Konaré
2000	2	3	Free	Alpha Oumar Konaré
2001	2	3	Free	Alpha Oumar Konaré
2002	2	3	Free	Alpha Oumar Konaré
2003	2	2	Free	Amadou Toumani Touré
2004	2	2	Free	Amadou Toumani Touré
2005	2	2	Free	Amadou Toumani Touré
2006	2	2	Free	Amadou Toumani Touré
2007	2	3	Free	Amadou Toumani Touré
2008	2	3	Free	Amadou Toumani Touré
2009	2	3	Free	Amadou Toumani Touré
2010	2	3	Free	Amadou Toumani Touré
2011	2	3	Free	Amadou Toumani Touré
2012	7	5	Not Free	Amadou Toumani Touré
2013	5	4	Partly Free	Dioncounda Traoré^{4}

== International treaties ==
Mali's stances on international human rights treaties are as follows:

International treaties
Treaty	Organization	Introduced	Signed	Ratified
Convention on the Prevention and Punishment of the Crime of Genocide	United Nations	1948	–	1974
International Convention on the Elimination of All Forms of Racial Discrimination	United Nations	1966	–	1974
International Covenant on Economic, Social and Cultural Rights	United Nations	1966	–	1974
International Covenant on Civil and Political Rights	United Nations	1966	–	1974
First Optional Protocol to the International Covenant on Civil and Political Rights	United Nations	1966	–	2001
Convention on the Non-Applicability of Statutory Limitations to War Crimes and Crimes Against Humanity	United Nations	1968	–	–
International Convention on the Suppression and Punishment of the Crime of Apartheid	United Nations	1973	–	1977
Convention on the Elimination of All Forms of Discrimination against Women	United Nations	1979	1985	1985
Convention against Torture and Other Cruel, Inhuman or Degrading Treatment or Punishment	United Nations	1984	–	1999
Convention on the Rights of the Child	United Nations	1989	1990	1990
Second Optional Protocol to the International Covenant on Civil and Political Rights, aiming at the abolition of the death penalty	United Nations	1989	-	-
International Convention on the Protection of the Rights of All Migrant Workers and Members of Their Families	United Nations	1990	–	2003
Optional Protocol to the Convention on the Elimination of All Forms of Discrimination against Women	United Nations	1999	–	2000
Optional Protocol to the Convention on the Rights of the Child on the Involvement of Children in Armed Conflict	United Nations	2000	2000	2002
Optional Protocol to the Convention on the Rights of the Child on the Sale of Children, Child Prostitution and Child Pornography	United Nations	2000	–	2002
Convention on the Rights of Persons with Disabilities	United Nations	2006	2007	2008
Optional Protocol to the Convention on the Rights of Persons with Disabilities	United Nations	2006	2007	2008
International Convention for the Protection of All Persons from Enforced Disappearance	United Nations	2006	2007	2009
Optional Protocol to the International Covenant on Economic, Social and Cultural Rights	United Nations	2008	2009	–
Optional Protocol to the Convention on the Rights of the Child on a Communications Procedure	United Nations	2011	2012	–

== See also ==
- Politics of Mali

== Notes ==
1.Note that the "Year" signifies the "Year covered". Therefore the information for the year marked 2008 is from the report published in 2009, and so on.
2.As of January 1.
3.The 1982 report covers the year 1981 and the first half of 1982, and the following 1984 report covers the second half of 1982 and the whole of 1983. In the interest of simplicity, these two aberrant "year and a half" reports have been split into three year-long reports through interpolation.
4.Acting.
