= Minister of Foreign Affairs (Mali) =

Government minister

Minister of Foreign Affairs of the Republic of Mali is a government minister in charge of the Ministry of Foreign Affairs of Mali, responsible for conducting foreign relations of the country.

The following is a list of foreign ministers of Mali since its founding in 1960:

No.	Name (Birth–Death)	Portrait	Tenure
1	Modibo Keïta (1915–1977)		1960–1961
2	Baréma Bocoum (1914–1973)		1961–1964
3	Ousmane Ba (1919–1999)		1964–1968
4	Jean-Marie Koné (1913–1988)		1968–1969
5	Sori Coulibaly (b. 1925)		1969–1970
6	Charles Semba Sissoko		1970–1978
7	Yusuf Traoré (b. 1935)		1978–1979
8	Alioune Blondin Beye (1939–1998)		1979–1986
9	Modibo Keita (1942–2021)		1986–1989
10	N'Golo Traoré (b. 1937)		1989–1991
11	Souleymane Sidibé (b. 1949)		1991
12	Tiébilé Dramé (1955–2025)		1991–1992
13	Mohamed Aloussine Touré		1992–1993
14	Ibrahim Boubacar Keïta (1945–2022)		1993–1994
15	Sy Kadiatou Sow (b. 1955)		1994
16	Dioncounda Traoré (b. 1942)		1994–1997
17	Modibo Sidibé (b. 1952)		1997–2002
18	Lassana Traoré (b. 1945)		2002–2004
19	Moctar Ouane (b. 1955)		2004–2011
20	Soumeylou Boubèye Maïga (1954–2022)		2011–2012
21	Sadio Lamine Sow (b. 1952)		2012
22	Tiéman Coulibaly (b. 1967)		2012–2013
23	Zahabi Ould Sidi Mohamed (b. 1957)		2013–2014
24	Abdoulaye Diop (b. 1965)		2014–2017
(22)	Tiéman Coulibaly (b. 1967)		2017–2018
25	Kamissa Camara (b. 1983)		2018–2019
(12)	Tiébilé Dramé (1955–2025)		2019–2020
26	Zeïni Moulaye (b. 1954)		2020–2021
27	Abdoulaye Diop (b. 1965)		2021–present

== Sources ==
- Rulers.org – Foreign ministers L–R
