= List of foreign ministers in 2018 =

This is a list of foreign ministers in 2018.

== Africa ==
- Algeria - Abdelkader Messahel (2017–2019)
- Angola - Manuel Domingos Augusto (2017–2020)
- Benin - Aurélien Agbénonci (2016–2023)
- Botswana -
  1. Pelonomi Venson-Moitoi (2014–2018)
  2. Vincent T. Seretse (2018)
  3. Unity Dow (2018–2020)
- Burkina Faso - Alpha Barry (2016–2021)
- Burundi -
  1. Alain Aimé Nyamitwe (2015–2018)
  2. Ezéchiel Nibigira (2018–2020)
- Cameroon- Lejeune Mbella Mbella (2015–present)
- Cape Verde - Luís Felipe Tavares (2016–2021)
- Central African Republic -
  1. Charles-Armel Doubane (2016–2018)
  2. Sylvie Baïpo-Temon (2018–present)
- Chad - Mahamat Zene Cherif (2017–2020)
- Comoros - Mohamed El-Amine Souef (2017–2020)
- Congo–Brazzaville (Republic of the Congo) - Jean-Claude Gakosso (2015–present)
- Congo–Kinshasa (Democratic Republic of the Congo) - Léonard She Okitundu (2016–2019)
- Djibouti - Mahamoud Ali Youssouf (2005–present)
- Egypt - Sameh Shoukry (2014–present)
- Equatorial Guinea -
  1. Agapito Mba Mokuy (2012–2018)
  2. Simeón Oyono Esono Angue (2018–present)
- Eritrea - Osman Saleh Mohammed (2007–present)
- Ethiopia - Workneh Gebeyehu (2016–2019)
- Gabon -
  1. Noël Nelson Messone (2017–2018)
  2. Régis Immongault Tatangani (2018–present)
- The Gambia -
  1. Ousainou Darboe (2017–2018)
  2. Mamadou Tangara (2018–2019)
- Ghana - Shirley Ayorkor Botchway (2017–present)
- Guinea - Mamadi Touré (2017–2021)
- Guinea-Bissau -
  1. Jorge Malú (2016–2018)
  2. João Ribeiro Butiam Có (2018–2019)
- Ivory Coast (Côte d'Ivoire) - Marcel Amon Tanoh (acting to 2017) (2016–2020)
- Kenya -
  1. Amina Mohamed (2013–2018)
  2. Monica Juma (2018–2020)
- Lesotho - Lesego Makgothi (2017–2020)
- Liberia -
  1. Marjon Kamara (2016–2018)
  2. Gbehzohngar Findley (2018–2020)
- Libya
  - Government of House of Representatives of Libya (Government of Libya internationally recognized to 2016) - Mohammed al-Dairi (2014–2019)
  - Government of National Accord of Libya (Interim government internationally recognized as the sole legitimate government of Libya from 2016) - Mohamed Taha Siala (2016–2021)
- Madagascar -
  1. Henry Rabary Njaka (2017–2018)
  2. Eloi Maxime Alphonse (2018–2019)
- Malawi - Emmanuel Fabiano (2017–2019)
- Mali -
  1. Tiéman Coulibaly (2017–2018)
  2. Kamissa Camara (2018–2019)
- Mauritania -
  1. Isselkou Ould Ahmed Izid Bih (2016–2018)
  2. Ismail Ould Cheikh Ahmed (2018–2022)
- Mauritius - Vishnu Lutchmeenaraidoo (2016–2019)
- Morocco - Nasser Bourita (2017–present)
- Mozambique - José Condungua Pacheco (2017–2020)
- Namibia - Netumbo Nandi-Ndaitwah (2012–2024)
- Niger -
  1. Ibrahim Yacouba (2016–2018)
  2. Kalla Ankourao (2018–2020)
- Nigeria - Geoffrey Onyeama (2015–2023)
- Rwanda -
  1. Louise Mushikiwabo (2009–2018)
  2. Richard Sezibera (2018–2019)
- São Tomé and Príncipe -
  1. Urbino Botelho (2016–2018)
  2. Elsa Teixeira Pinto (2018–2020)
- Senegal - Sidiki Kaba (2017–2019)
- Seychelles - Vincent Meriton (2018–2020)
- Sierra Leone -
  1. Kaifala Marah (2017–2018)
  2. Alie Kabba (2018–2019)
- Somalia -
  1. Yusuf Garaad Omar (2017–2018)
  2. Ahmed Isse Awad (2018–2020)
- Somaliland -
  1. Saad Ali Shire (2015–2018)
  2. Yasin Haji Mohamoud (2018–2021)
- South Africa -
  1. Maite Nkoana-Mashabane (2009–2018)
  2. Lindiwe Sisulu (2018–2019)
- South Sudan -
  1. Deng Alor (2016–2018)
  2. Martin Elia Lomuro (acting) (2018)
  3. Nhial Deng Nhial (2018–2019)
- Sudan -
  1. Ibrahim Ghandour (2015–2018)
  2. Mohamed Abdalla Idris (acting)(2018)
  3. al-Dirdiri Mohamed Ahmed (2018–2019)
- Swaziland –
  1. Mgwagwa Gamedze (2013–2018)
  2. Joel Musa Nhleko (acting) (2018)
  3. Thuli Dladla (2018–2023)
- Tanzania - Augustine Mahiga (2015–2019)
- Togo - Robert Dussey (2013–present)
- Tunisia - Khemaies Jhinaoui (2016–2019)
- Uganda - Sam Kutesa (2005–2021)
- Western Sahara - Mohamed Salem Ould Salek (1998–2023)
- Zambia -
  1. Harry Kalaba (2014–2018)
  2. Joe Malanji (2018–2021)
- Zimbabwe - Sibusiso Moyo (2017–2021)

== Asia ==
- Abkhazia - Daur Kove (2016–2021)
- Afghanistan - Salahuddin Rabbani (2015–2019)
- Armenia -
  1. Eduard Nalbandyan (2008–2018)
  2. Zohrab Mnatsakanian (2018–2020)
- Artsakh - Masis Mayilyan (2017–2021)
- Azerbaijan - Elmar Mammadyarov (2004–2020)
- Bahrain - Sheikh Khalid ibn Ahmad Al Khalifah (2005–2020)
- Bangladesh - Abul Hassan Mahmud Ali (2014–2019)
- Bhutan -
  1. Damcho Dorji (2015–2018)
  2. Dasho Tshering Wangchuk (acting) (2018)
  3. Tandi Dorji (2018–present)
- Brunei - Hassanal Bolkiah (2015–present)
- Cambodia - Prak Sokhon (2016–2023)
- China (People's Republic of China) - Wang Yi (2013–present)
- East Timor –
  1. Aurélio Guterres (2017–2018)
  2. Dionísio Babo Soares (2018–2020)
- Georgia -
  1. Mikheil Janelidze (2015–2018)
  2. Davit Zalkaliani (2018–2022)
- India - Sushma Swaraj (2014–2019)
- Indonesia - Retno Marsudi (2014–present)
- Iran - Mohammad Javad Zarif (2013–2021)
- Iraq -
  1. Ibrahim al-Jaafari (2014–2018)
  2. Mohamed Ali Alhakim (2018–2020)
  - Kurdistan - Falah Mustafa Bakir (2006–2019)
- Israel - Benjamin Netanyahu (2015–2019)
- Japan - Tarō Kōno (2017–2019)
- Jordan - Ayman Safadi (2017–present)
- Kazakhstan –
  1. Kairat Abdrakhmanov (2016–2018)
  2. Beibut Atamkulov (2018–2019)
- North Korea (Democratic People's Republic of Korea) - Ri Yong-ho (2016–2020)
- South Korea (Republic of Korea) - Kang Kyung-wha (2017–2021)
- Kuwait - Sheikh Sabah Al-Khalid Al-Sabah (2011–2019)
- Kyrgyzstan -
  1. Erlan Abdyldayev (2012–2018)
  2. Chingiz Aidarbekov (2018–2020)
- Laos - Saleumxay Kommasith (2016–present)
- Lebanon - Gebran Bassil (2014–2020)
- Malaysia -
  1. Anifah Aman (2009–2018)
  2. Saifuddin Abdullah (2018–2020)
- Maldives -
  1. Mohamed Asim (2016–2018)
  2. Abdulla Shahid (2018–present)
- Mongolia - Damdin Tsogtbaatar (2017–2020)
- Myanmar - Aung San Suu Kyi (2016–2021)
- Nagorno-Karabakh
- see under Artsakh
- Nepal -
  1. Sher Bahadur Deuba (2017–2018)
  2. Pradeep Gyawali (2018–2021)
- Oman - Yusuf bin Alawi bin Abdullah (1982–2020)
- Pakistan -
  1. Khawaja Muhammad Asif (2017–2018)
  2. Tehmina Janjua (acting) (2018)
  3. Khurram Dastgir Khan (2018)
  4. Hussain Haroon (2018)
  5. Shah Mehmood Qureshi (2018–2022)
- Palestine - Riyad al-Maliki (2007–present)
- Philippines -
  1. Alan Peter Cayetano (2017–2018)
  2. Teodoro Locsin Jr. (2018–2022)
- Qatar - Sheikh Mohammed bin Abdulrahman Al Thani (2016–present)
- Saudi Arabia -
  1. Adel al-Jubeir (2015–2018)
  2. Ibrahim Abdulaziz Al-Assaf (2018–2019)
- Singapore - Vivian Balakrishnan (2015–present)
- South Ossetia - Dmitry Medoyev (2017–2022)
- Sri Lanka -
  1. Tilak Marapana (2017–2018)
  2. Sarath Amunugama (2018)
  3. Tilak Marapana (2018–2019)
- Syria (Syrian Arab Republic - Walid Muallem (2006–2020)
- Taiwan (Republic of China) -
  1. David Lee (2016–2018)
  2. Joseph Wu (2018–2024)
- Tajikistan - Sirodjidin Aslov (2013–present)
- Thailand - Don Pramudwinai (2015–2023)
- Timor-Leste -
  1. Aurélio Guterres (2017–2018)
  2. Dionísio Babo (2018–present)
- Turkey - Mevlüt Çavuşoğlu (2015–2023)
- Turkmenistan - Raşit Meredow (2001–present)
- United Arab Emirates - Sheikh Abdullah bin Zayed Al Nahyan (2006–present)
- Uzbekistan - Abdulaziz Komilov (2012–2022)
- Vietnam - Phạm Bình Minh (2011–2021)
- Yemen
  - Republic of Yemen -
    1. Abdulmalik Al-Mekhlafi (2015–2018)
    2. Khaled al-Yamani (2018–2019)
  - Supreme Political Council (unrecognised, rival government) - Hisham Abdullah (2016–present)

== Europe ==
- Albania - Ditmir Bushati (2013–2019)
- Andorra - Maria Ubach Font (2017–present)
- Austria – Karin Kneissl (2017–2019)
- Belarus - Vladimir Makei (2012–2022)
- Belgium - Didier Reynders (2011–2019)
  - Brussels - Guy Vanhengel (2013–2019)
  - Flanders - Geert Bourgeois (2014–2019)
  - Wallonia - Willy Borsus (2017–2019)
- Bosnia and Herzegovina - Igor Crnadak (2015–2019)
- Bulgaria – Ekaterina Zakharieva (2017–2021)
- Croatia - Marija Pejčinović Burić (2017–2019)
- Cyprus -
  1. Ioannis Kasoulidis (2013–2018)
  2. Nikos Christodoulidis (2018–2022)
- Czech Republic -
  1. Martin Stropnický (2017–2018)
  2. Jan Hamáček (acting) (2018)
  3. Tomáš Petříček (2018–2021)
- Denmark - Anders Samuelsen (2016–2019)
  - Faroe Islands - Poul Michelsen (2015–2019)
- Donetsk People's Republic - Natalya Nikonorova (2016–present)
- Estonia - Sven Mikser (2016–2019)
- Finland - Timo Soini (2015–2019)
- France - Jean-Yves Le Drian (2017–2022)
- Germany -
  1. Sigmar Gabriel (2017–2018)
  2. Heiko Maas (2018–2021)
- Greece -
  1. Nikos Kotzias (2015–2018)
  2. Alexis Tsipras (2018–2019)
  3. Georgios Katrougalos (2019-2019)
  4. Nikos Dendias (2019–2023)
- Guernsey - Jonathan Le Tocq (2016–present)
- Hungary - Péter Szijjártó (2014–present)
- Iceland - Guðlaugur Þór Þórðarson (2017–2021)
- Ireland - Simon Coveney (2017–2022)
- Italy -
  1. Angelino Alfano (2016–2018)
  2. Enzo Moavero Milanesi (2018–2019)
- Jersey -
  1. Sir Philip Bailhache (2013–2018)
  2. Ian Gorst (2018–2022)
- Kosovo - Behgjet Pacolli (2017–2020)
- Latvia - Edgars Rinkēvičs (2011–2023)
- Liechtenstein - Aurelia Frick (2009–2019)
- Lithuania - Linas Antanas Linkevičius (2012–2020)
- Lugansk People's Republic - Vladislav Deinevo (2017–present)
- Luxembourg - Jean Asselborn (2004–2023)
- Republic of Macedonia - Nikola Dimitrov (2017–2020)
- Malta - Carmelo Abela (2017–2020)
- Moldova -
  1. Andrei Galbur (2016–2018)
  2. Tudor Ulianovschi (2018–2019)
  - Gagauzia - Vitaliy Vlah (2015–present)
- Monaco - Gilles Tonelli (2015–2019)
- Montenegro - Srđan Darmanović (2016–2020)
- Netherlands -
  1. Halbe Zijlstra (2017–2018)
  2. Sigrid Kaag (acting) (2018)
  3. Stef Blok (2018–2021)
- Northern Cyprus -
  1. Tahsin Ertuğruloğlu (2016–2018)
  2. Kudret Özersay (2018–2020)
- Norway - Ine Marie Eriksen Søreide (2017–2021)
- Poland -
  1. Witold Waszczykowski (2015–2018)
  2. Jacek Czaputowicz (2018–2020)
- Portugal - Augusto Santos Silva (2015–2022)
- Romania - Teodor Meleșcanu (2017–2019)
- Russia - Sergey Lavrov (2004–present)
- San Marino - Nicola Renzi (2016–2020)
- Serbia - Ivica Dačić (2014–2020)
- Slovakia - Miroslav Lajčák (2012–2020)
- Slovenia -
  1. Karl Erjavec (2012–2018)
  2. Miro Cerar (2018–2020)
- Spain -
  1. Alfonso Dastis (2016–2018)
  2. Josep Borrell (2018–2019)
  - Catalonia
      1. Ernest Maragall (2018–2019)
      2. Alfred Bosch (2019–2020)
- Sweden - Margot Wallström (2014–2019)
- Switzerland - Ignazio Cassis (2017–present)
- Transnistria - Vitaly Ignatiev (2015–present)
- Ukraine - Pavlo Klimkin (2014–2019)
- United Kingdom -
  1. Boris Johnson (2016–2018)
  2. Jeremy Hunt (2018–2019)
  - Scotland - Fiona Hyslop (2009–2020)
- Vatican City - Archbishop Paul Gallagher (2014–present)

== North America and the Caribbean ==
- Antigua and Barbuda -
  1. Charles Fernandez (2014–2018)
  2. E.P. Chet Greene (2018–present)
- The Bahamas - Darren Henfield (2017–2021)
- Barbados -
  1. Maxine McClean (2008–2018)
  2. Jerome Walcott (2018–present)
- Belize - Wilfred Elrington (2008–2020)
- Canada - Chrystia Freeland (2017–2019)
  - Quebec -
    1. Christine St-Pierre (2014–2018)
    2. Nadine Girault (2018–2022)
- Costa Rica -
  1. Manuel González Sanz (2014–2018)
  2. Epsy Campbell Barr (2018)
  3. Lorena Aguilar Revelo (acting) (2018–2019)
- Cuba - Bruno Rodríguez Parrilla (2009–present)
- Dominica - Francine Baron (2014–2019)
- Dominican Republic - Miguel Vargas Maldonado (2016–2020)
- El Salvador -
  1. Hugo Martínez (2014–2018)
  2. Carlos Alfredo Castaneda (2018–2019)
- Greenland –
  1. Suka K. Frederiksen (2017–2018)
  2. Vivian Motzfeldt (2018)
  3. Ane Lone Bagger (2018–2020)
- Grenada -
  1. Elvin Nimrod (2016–2018)
  2. Peter David (2018–2020)
- Guatemala - Sandra Jovel (2017–2020)
- Haiti -
  1. Antonio Rodrigue (2017–2018)
  2. Bocchit Edmond (2018–2020)
- Honduras - María Dolores Agüero (2016–2019)
- Jamaica - Kamina Johnson-Smith (2016–present)
- Mexico -
  1. Luis Videgaray Caso (2017–2018)
  2. Marcelo Ebrard (2018–2023)
- Nicaragua –Denis Moncada (2017–present)
- Panama - Isabel Saint Malo (2014–2019)
- Puerto Rico – Luis G. Rivera Marín (2017–2019)
- Saint Kitts and Nevis - Mark Brantley (2015–2022)
- Saint Lucia - Allen Chastanet (2016–2021)
- Saint Vincent and the Grenadines - Sir Louis Straker (2015–2020)
- Trinidad and Tobago - Dennis Moses (2015–2020)
- United States -
  1. Rex Tillerson (2017–2018)
  2. John J. Sullivan (acting) (2018)
  3. Mike Pompeo (2018–2021)

== Oceania ==
- Australia -
  1. Julie Bishop (2013–2018)
  2. Marise Payne (2018–2022)
- Cook Islands - Henry Puna (2013–2020)
- Fiji - Frank Bainimarama (2016–2019)
- French Polynesia - Édouard Fritch (2014–present)
- Kiribati - Taneti Mamau (2016–present)
- Marshall Islands - John Silk (2016–2020)
- Micronesia - Lorin S. Robert (2007–2019)
- Nauru - Baron Waqa (2013–2019)
- New Zealand - Winston Peters (2017–2020)
- Niue - Toke Talagi (2008–2020)
- Palau – Faustina Rehuher-Marugg (2017–2021)
- Papua New Guinea - Rimbink Pato (2012–2019)
- Samoa - Tuilaepa Aiono Sailele Malielegaoi (1998–2021)
- Solomon Islands - Milner Tozaka (2014–2019)
- Tokelau –
  1. Siopili Perez (2017–2018)
  2. Afega Gaualofa (2018–2019)
- Tonga –
  1. Siaosi Sovaleni (2017–2018)
  2. ʻAkilisi Pōhiva (2018–2019)
- Tuvalu - Taukelina Finikaso (2013–2019)
- Vanuatu – Ralph Regenvanu (2017–2020)

== South America ==
- Argentina - Jorge Faurie (2017–2019)
- Bolivia -
  1. Fernando Huanacuni Mamani (2017–2018)
  2. Diego Pary (2018–2019)
- Brazil - Aloysio Nunes (2017–2019)
- Chile -
  1. Heraldo Muñoz (2014–2018)
  2. Roberto Ampuero (2018–2019)
- Colombia -
  1. María Ángela Holguín (2010–2018)
  2. Carlos Holmes Trujillo (2018–2019)
- Ecuador -
  1. María Fernanda Espinosa (2017–2018)
  2. José Valencia Amores (2018–2020)
- Guyana - Carl Greenidge (2015–2019)
- Paraguay -
  1. Eladio Loizaga (2013–2018)
  2. Luis Castiglioni (2018–2019)
- Peru -
  1. Ricardo Luna (2016–2018)
  2. Cayetana Aljovín (2018)
  3. Néstor Popolizio (2018–2019)
- Suriname - Yldiz Pollack-Beighle (2017–2020)
- Uruguay - Rodolfo Nin Novoa (2015–2020)
- Venezuela - Jorge Arreaza (2017–2021)

== See also ==
- List of current foreign ministers
