= Abdoulaye Diop =

Abdoulaye Diop may refer to:

- Abdoulaye Diop (diplomat) (born 1965), Malian diplomat and politician
- Abdoulaye Diop (footballer) (born 1999), Senegalese footballer
