= Souleymane Sidibé =

Souleymane Sidibé may refer to:

- Sol Sidibe, footballer
- Souleymane Sidibé (politician)
