= Raymond Shonholtz =

Raymond Shonholtz J.D. (June 8, 1943 - January 7, 2012) was the founder of two community mediation organizations; Community Boards in 1976 and Partners for Democratic Change in 1989.

== Early life ==
Raymond Shonholtz graduated from Los Angeles High School, University of California, Los Angeles, and UC Berkeley School of Law. During the Summer of 1964, following his sophomore year at UCLA, Shonholtz took part in the Mississippi Freedom Summer as an American Field Services bus chaperon. While there he smuggled Aaron Henry of the Mississippi Freedom Democratic Party out of Clarksdale, Mississippi, so that Dr. Henry might attend the 1964 Democratic National Convention.

== Professional life ==
In 1976 after serving as a Public Defender in California, Shonholtz established and served as President of Community Boards one of the first community and school mediation initiatives that brought conflict resolution skills and processes into neighborhoods and schools throughout the U.S. and internationally.

In 1989, Shonholtz established and served as President of Partners for Democratic Change, an international organization committed to building sustainable capacity to advance civil society and a culture of change and conflict management worldwide by establishing the first of Partners national Centers for Change and Conflict Management in Poland. Up to his retirement on September 30, 2011 Partners for Democratic Change had established 18 independent Centers for conflict resolution and change management throughout the developing world which are all part of the international network Partners for Democratic Change International.

In 2008, Shonholtz served as a Public Policy Scholar at the Woodrow Wilson International Center for Scholars in Washington, D.C., working on foreign assistance recommendations for the incoming Obama administration.

In November 2011, he delivered the keynote address to the Oregon Mediation Association 25th Annual Conference.

== Legacy ==
The Association for Conflict Resolution’s International Section (ACRIS) presented Partners for Democratic Change with the Outstanding Leadership Award in 2007 in recognition of that organization’s work building sustainable local capacity to advance civil society and a culture of change and conflict management worldwide.

Partners for Democratic Change received the JAMS Foundation’s Fourth Annual Warren Knight Award in recognition of Partners effectively managing and resolving conflict and for assisting emerging democracies throughout the world to advance a civil society.
