= Kamissa Camara =

Chief of Staff of President of Mali
- In office 11 June 2020 – 24 September 2020
- President: Ibrahim Boubacar Keïta

Minister of the Digital Economy and Planning
- In office 5 May 2019 – 10 June 2020
- Prime Minister: Boubou Cissé
- Preceded by: Arouna Modibo Touré

Foreign Minister of Mali
- In office 9 September 2018 – 23 April 2019
- Prime Minister: Soumeylou Boubèye Maïga
- Preceded by: Tiéman Coulibaly
- Succeeded by: Tiébilé Dramé

Personal details
- Born: Grenoble, France
- Citizenship: Mali, United States, France

Kamissa Camara is a political analyst, politician and academic. She is the former chief of staff to the President of Mali, having resigned from the position on September 24, 2020, following the August 2020 coup d'état. She served as the country's Minister of Foreign Affairs from September 9, 2018 to April 23, 2019, then Minister of the Digital Economy and Planning from May 5, 2019 to June 11, 2020. Since 2023, she has been working in academia in the United States.

== Early life and education ==
Camara was born in Grenoble to Malian parents who had emigrated to France in the 1970s.

Camara has a B.A. in International Relations from Paris Diderot University and an M.A. in International Economics and Development from Pierre Mendès-France University.

In June 2026, she completed a DPhil in political science at the University of Oxford.

== Career ==
From 2007, Camara worked at the International Foundation for Electoral Systems overseeing West Africa and was one of the observers for the 2013 Malian presidential election in Timbuktu. She moved to the National Endowment for Democracy in 2012, where she was promoted to vice director for Central and West Africa in 2016. She also worked for a time with US presidential candidate Hillary Clinton as her senior advisor on the Sahel.

Camara was a member of the Center for African Studies at Harvard University until December 2017. She was also the Director for Sub-Saharan Africa at the NGO PartnersGlobal until June 2018. She has written opinion pieces and political analysis for various publications in English and French and has been a political commentator on English and French TV programs. She was the first Malian political scientist to appear on CNN.

Camara is the founder and co-chair of the Sahel Strategy Forum. In 2017, she wrote a letter to Mali's President Ibrahim Boubacar Keïta, asking him to withdraw his plans to change the constitution. In July 2018, he appointed her as his diplomatic advisor. She was appointed Minister for Foreign Affairs by Keita on 9 September 2018, the youngest person to hold the post, and one of eleven women in the thirty-two member cabinet. She has spoken about regional security issues and alleged human rights violations. As of December 2018, when she gave a speech to the United Nations General Assembly in Marrakesh deploring the withdrawal of some countries from the Global Compact for Migration, she was the world's youngest Foreign minister.

Since 2023, Camara has been a professor of practice in international dipolomacy in the University of Michigan's Gerald R. Ford School of Public Policy. She has been a member of the board of Afrobarometer since 2024.

== Personal life ==
Camara is a citizen of France, the US and Mali, and is fluent in French, English and Bambara.

== Selected publications ==
- Camara, Kamissa (September 16, 2016). "Here's how African leaders stage 'constitutional coups': They tweak the constitution to stay in power". The Washington Post.
- Camara, Kamissa (16 November 2016). "Mali is becoming a failed state and it is not the jihadists' fault". Africa Research Institute.
- Camara, Kamissa (April 7, 2017). "After Helping Solve Gambia's Political Crisis, Senegal Needs an Exit Strategy". World Politics Review.
- Camara, Kamissa (2021). It is time to rethink US strategy in the Sahel. US Institute for Peace.
- Camara, Kamissa (December 6, 2022). As terrorist groups expand in the Sahel, is Algeria the missing link?. Middle East Institute.
- Tugendhat, Henry; Camara, Kamissa (29 November 2022). "Washington Needs a Better Message in Africa Than 'Don't Trust China'". Foreign Policy.
