= PDCI =

Abbreviations referring to organisations:

- Pacific DC Intertie, also known as Path 65
- Democratic Party of Côte d'Ivoire - African Democratic Rally, (in French: Parti Démocratique de la Côte d'Ivoire), a political party in Côte d'Ivoire
- Partners for Democratic Change International, an international NGO network promoting democracy and civic education
- Partito dei Comunisti Italiani, a political party in Italy
- Perth District Collegiate Institute, a secondary school in Perth, Ontario, Canada.
