= Community Board =

Community Board may refer to:

- Community boards in New Zealand, a level of local government
- Community Boards, a community based mediation program, established in 1976, in San Francisco, California, in the United States
- Community boards of New York City, 59 local representative bodies in New York City
  - Community boards of the Bronx, 12 local representative bodies in The Bronx, New York City
  - Community boards of Brooklyn, 18 local representative bodies in Brooklyn, New York City
  - Community boards of Manhattan, 12 local representative bodies in Manhattan, New York City
  - Community boards of Queens, 14 local representative bodies in Queens, New York City
  - Community boards of Staten Island, 3 local representative bodies in Staten Island, New York City
