= Tiéman Coulibaly =

Malian politician

Tiéman Hubert Coulibaly
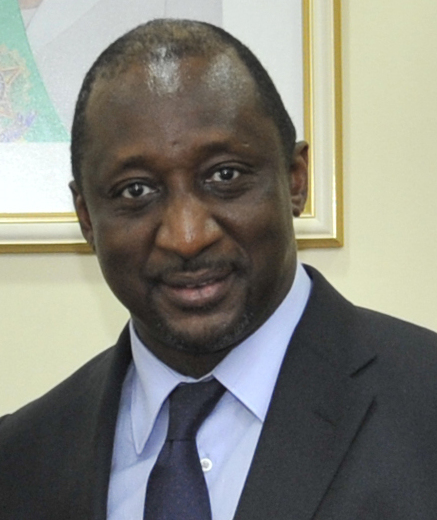
- Coulibaly in March 2015

Minister of Foreign Affairs
- In office December 30, 2017 – September 9, 2018
- President: Ibrahim Boubacar Keita
- Prime Minister: Soumeylou Boubeye Maiga
- Preceded by: Abdoulaye Diop
- Succeeded by: Kamissa Camara
- In office August 20, 2012 – September 7, 2013
- President: Diouncounda Traore
- Prime Minister: Cheick Modibo Diarra
- Preceded by: Soumeylou Boubeye Maiga
- Succeeded by: Sadio Lamine Sow

Minister of Defense
- In office January 8, 2015 – September 2, 2016
- President: Ibrahim Boubacar Keita
- Prime Minister: Modibo Keita
- Preceded by: Bah N'Daw
- Succeeded by: Abdoulaye Idrissa Maïga

Personal details
- Born: Bamako, Mali
- Party: UDD
- Education: Jean Monnet University; Stendhal University

Tiéman Hubert Coulibaly is a Malian politician who served as the Minister of Foreign Affairs of Mali between 2012 and 2013 and 2017 and 2018. Coulibaly also served as the Minister of State Domains and Land Affairs between 2013 and 2014, and the Minister of Defense between 2015 and 2016.

== Biography ==
Coulibaly was born in Bamako, Mali, and graduated from Jean Monnet University and Stendhal University in France. He first entered politics at university, joining the Union of Communist Students while at Jean Monnet University. He then joined the Socialist Party of France, and supported Michel Rocard, along with forming the Malian Students of Saint-Etienne student association.

When he returned to Mali, Coulibaly worked at a variety of Malian businesses including as the general administrator of European Handling Mali-sa and as the CEO of the Stellis telecommunications group based in Mali, Burkina Faso, and Guinea. He became vice-president of the Union for Democracy and Development (UDD) in 2010. Following the 2012 Malian coup d'état, Coulibaly was appointed Minister of Foreign Affairs on August 21, 2012, serving in the role until 2013.

As foreign minister, Coulibaly expressed the need for stronger ties with Niger over counter-terrorism efforts in the early years of the Mali War, and claimed that "conventional war is over" in 2013. His first priority as foreign minister was the recapture of Azawad from the National Movement for the Liberation of Azawad (MNLA). In his role as Minister of State Domains and Land Affairs which he held from 2013 to 2014, he received some support. Coulibaly also served as Minister of Defense between 2015 and 2016, but was sacked after a deadly jihadist attack in Boni. He returned as the Minister of Foreign Affairs again in 2017, but was sacked in favor of Kamissa Coumara in 2018.

Following the 2021 Malian coup d'état, Coulibaly was forced to flee the country into Côte d'Ivoire and later France. He became an outspoken critic of the Malian junta led by Assimi Goïta, and has referred to him as a dictator. In August 2022, the junta released an international arrest warrant for Coulibaly and former colleagues of the Ibrahim Boubacar Keïta (IBK) administration for forgery and corruption.
