= Malian Party of Labour =

Political party in Mali

The Malian Party of Labour (French: Parti malien du travail, PMT) is a Marxist–Leninist party in Mali and a member of the coalition supporting the Alliance for Democracy in Mali of president Amadou Toumani Touré. Founded in 1965, it was prominent in the student resistance to the 1968–1991 military regime of General Moussa Traoré. It continues as an extra-parliamentary Hoxhaist–Communist faction within the Social-Democratic ADEMA-PASJ coalition, supporters of the Alliance for Democracy and Progress.

== Formation ==
The PMT was a Marxist–Leninist outgrowth of the Parti africain de l'indépendance, founded in 1958, itself collaborating with the US-RDA of Modibo Keita. The PMT formed a separate entity in 1965, and was even during the RDA period a semi-clandestine organisation.

== Under military rule ==
The group began to gain prominence only after the 1968 coup by General Moussa Traoré. From 1968, the PMT was one of the most active of underground opposition to the Military regime, and especially drew from student groups. The PMT was one group that had been involved in the leftist Union Nationale des Élèves et Étudiants du Mali (UNEEM), which the regime of Moussa Traoré replaced with a state controlled organisation, the Union Nationale des Jeunes du Mali (UNJM). The PMT and other elements of the UNEEM—those who had prodded the RDA government from the left like the PMT, and those that had been part of the ruling RD, became the basis for much internal resistance to the military. This mostly took place in the form of labour struggles, propaganda, and the printing and distribution of illicit newspapers and pasting of anti-government placards in the streets of Mali's cities.

=== Underground activism ===
Prominent PMT activists in the 1960s and 1970s included Abdrahamane Baba Touré (A PAI founder), Soumeylou Boubèye Maïga, and Cheick Moctary Diarra, who at the same time was a prominent government journalist. The last two were both graduates of the Senegalese Centre d'études des sciences et techniques de l'information university program, a breeding ground for resistants to the government while outside Mali. Other prominent activists included Yaya Maïga, Aly Sankaré, Hamidou Ongoïba, Aboubacar Oumar Maïa, and Alioune Nouhoum Diallo. Some elements of the PMT entered the government as clandestine Communists, including Dr. NGolo Traoré and the future Prime Minister of Mali, Alpha Oumar Konaré, who joined the Military government as Labour Minister from 1978 to 1980.

=== Coalitions ===
On 20 January 1986 at Thiaroye, Senegal, the PMT joined a coalition with the underground former youth wing of the RDA, the Malian Party for Revolution and Democracy (le Parti Malien pour la Révolution et la Démocratie, PMRD) and the French-based Democratic People's Front of Mali (Front Démocratique et Populaire Malien, FDPM). This new group was called the Front national démocratique populaire. They were joined by other clandestine groups, including the Groupe Tiémoko Garan Kouyaté. In 1990, the remnants of the RDA also joined, forming the Alliance for Democracy in Mali (ADEMA-PASJ), the political coalition that penned a famous 7 August 1990 open letter demanding General Traoré step down and was heavily involved in the 1991 popular unrest overthrew of his regime.

== Post 1991 ==
The PMT continued as a Hoxhaist–Communist faction within the ADEMA-PASJ coalition. In 2007, former PMT leader, 2002 presidential candidate and then ADEMA vice-president Soumeylou Boubèye Maïga openly opposed their support of the ruling Alliance for Democracy and Progress of president Amadou Toumani Touré. On 24–25 February 2007 ADEMA-PASJ delegates voted to expel Boubèye Maïga, along with former PMT members Issa Diarra, Ibrahima Kantao, Binta Yattassaye and Oumar Ag El Méhidi.

== See also ==
- List of anti-revisionist groups
