= Les Echos (Mali) =

Newspaper from Mali

- Founder: Alpha Oumar Konaré
- Editor: Jamana
- Founded: March 17, 1989
- Language: French
- City: Bamako
- Country: Mali
- OCLC number: 51508852
- Website: http://www.lesechos.ml

Les Echos is a daily French-language online newspaper published in Bamako, Mali.
