= Ferdinand Duranton =

French explorer and trader (died 1838)

Ferdinand Stanislas Sébastien Duranton (died 1838) was a French explorer and trader who was active in what is now Senegal and Mali. After entering colonial service in 1819, he worked for a Galam trading association and undertook journeys in the upper Senegal River region. He married Sadioba, a daughter of Awa Demba, ruler of Khasso, and became involved in the region's political and military conflicts.

His independent activities brought him into conflict with the Compagnie de Galam and the French colonial authorities, whose accusations included serving British interests. Arrested in 1837, he was released after a second inquiry found that he had not participated in the detention of a French boat. He died in Médine, modern Mali, soon after.

== Early life ==
Duranton was born at Jérémie in Saint-Domingue (modern Haiti); his date of birth is uncertain. In a note dated 11 February 1819, he gave his birth date as 31 October 1797, but in August 1837 he wrote that he would enter his fiftieth year within three months. In his 1921 study of Duranton's early career, Claude Faure placed his birth around 1788.

Duranton served for ten years in elite army units and became a lieutenant and standard-bearer in the 2nd Infantry Regiment of the Guard before resigning on 18 November 1816. After unsuccessful applications for overseas employment, he was appointed an auxiliary clerk in the colonial administration on 10 February 1819.

== First stay in Senegal, 1819–1826 ==
Duranton reached Senegal aboard La Normande on 30 July 1819. He initially worked in hospital administration at Saint-Louis and was assigned to the administrative service at Dagana on 10 November that year. His accounts became the subject of an administrative inquiry, but the colonial council accepted them in January 1821, attributing their irregularities to his workload, inexperience and ill health. He subsequently requested to leave the service, and his resignation took effect on 1 April 1821.

After unsuccessful commercial ventures, he entered the service of the Société de Galam, a trading association serving the upper Senegal valley, in 1822 and visited Caignou on its instructions. Trade in Gajaaga (then called Galam) was organized through successive trading associations: annual companies preceded the Compagnie de Galam constituted in 1824 with a four-year concession granting a seasonal trading monopoly. Roger, the French governor of Senegal, later sent him ahead of the naval officer Grout de Beaufort into the Bambouk, and he reached the Félou Falls. At the end of 1824 he replaced Sergeant Montesquieu, who was returning to France, in the exploration enterprise associated with Beaufort.

Duranton's proposed journey to Timbuktu did not take him beyond Khasso, where he married Sadioba, daughter of the local ruler Awa Demba. In a letter of March 1826, Roger complained that Duranton had remained there for almost a year and had failed to communicate with the administration. After Duranton returned in poor health, Roger arranged his passage to France aboard La Gazelle, bound for Nantes, and recommended him to Christophe de Chabrol de Crouzol, France's Minister of the Navy and Colonies.

== Return to Senegal and political activity ==
In June 1828, the French Ministry of the Navy and Colonies approved Duranton's proposal to investigate the gold mines of the Bambouk, providing funds and two assistants, Mouttet and Tourette. The three arrived at Saint-Louis on 31 July 1828. Mouttet fell ill and was assigned to geological work at Gorée and in Waalo; Tourette was sent back to Bakel in February 1829 and requested to return to France.

Duranton settled in Khasso and repeatedly failed to answer letters or summonses from the colonial administration. In July 1829 he reported that he had assisted Awa Demba in a war against the people of Logo, contrary to the orders he had received. He also supported Samba Comba, ruler of Gajaaga, against Samba Yacine.

== Conflict with the colonial authorities ==
Agents of the Compagnie de Galam accused Duranton of disrupting trade and encouraging wars that endangered French commercial interests. Further accusations alleged that he intended to create a kingdom for himself, monopolize commerce in the upper Senegal region, and act on behalf of British interests in Gambia. In late 1836, Governor Médéric Malavois adopted the accusations against him and informed local rulers that Duranton had no official authority.

After Samba Comba obstructed the passage of company boats, an inquiry was opened into Duranton's involvement. On 6 July 1837, Duranton was arrested at Bakel after refusing to surrender his artillery and was taken to Saint-Louis. Governor Guillet considered the first inquiry defective and commissioned Lieutenant Simon to conduct another investigation. In his 1918 study of the affair, Georges Hardy reports that this inquiry found that Duranton had been ill when a French boat was detained at Kounguel, had not taken part in its detention, and had tried to prevent it; he was then released.

Duranton sought judicial redress against the accusations, but the governor required him to submit to custody again and indicated that a new investigation would extend beyond the Kounguel incident. Duranton abandoned the proceedings and promised to leave Gajaaga for the upper Gambia. He nevertheless returned to the upper Senegal region and renewed his association with Samba Comba.

== Death and family ==
Hardy dates Duranton's death at Médine to 4 September 1838, citing a governor’s dispatch of 20 October 1838; he rejects the year 1841 inscribed on Duranton's tomb. Duranton and Sadioba had two children, a son and a daughter whom Hardy calls Mary, who were sent to Saint-Louis after his death. Hardy also recounts the traveller Raffenel's meeting with Sadioba in Bundu in 1843.

== Historical reputation and commemoration ==
In his study of the Duranton affair, published in 1918, Georges Hardy argued that hostility from the Compagnie de Galam arose from the threat Duranton posed to its commercial privileges, and portrayed his political alliances as anticipating later French colonial expansion.

Duranton is the subject of Adame Ba Konaré's 2018 book Le griot m’a raconté… Ferdinand Duranton, le Prince français du Khasso (1797–1838). In a review, Gilles Louÿs describes the work as combining archival and historical material with oral tradition and a fictional narrative built around a griot recounting Duranton's life.

The Rue Duranton in Paris has commemorated him since 1875; the neighboring Square Duranton takes its name from the street.

== Sources ==
- Saulnier, Eugène (1921). Une compagnie à privilège au XIXe siècle : La Compagnie de Galam au Sénégal (in French). Paris: Émile Larose.
- French Senate. "Chabrol de Crouzol Christophe, comte de Chabrol" (in French).
- Faure, Claude (1921). "Le premier séjour de Duranton au Sénégal (1819–1826)". Revue de l'histoire des colonies françaises (in French). 12: 189–268.
- Hardy, Georges (1918). "Un épisode de l'exploration du Soudan. L'affaire Duranton (1828–1838)". Annuaire et mémoires du Comité d'études historiques et scientifiques de l'Afrique occidentale française (in French). 1917: 413–436.
- Louÿs, Gilles (1 March 2020). "Adame Ba Konaré, Le griot m'a raconté… Ferdinand Duranton, le Prince français du Khasso (1797–1838)". Viatica (in French). 7 (7). doi:10.4000/viatica.1389.
- City of Paris. "Square Duranton" (in French).
