= PartnersGlobal =

Non-governmental organization

- Formation: 1989
- Founder: Raymond Shonholtz
- Legal status: Active
- Headquarters: Washington, DC
- Region served: International
- Executive Director(s): Kyra Buchko and Roselie Vasquez-Yetter, Co-Executive Directors
- Board Chair: Chris Mitchell
- Website: partnersglobal.org
- Formerly called: Partners for Democratic Change

PartnersGlobal, formerly known as Partners for Democratic Change, is a non-government organization founded in 1989 to build local capacity for conflict resolution and change management in the developing world. It does this through two main methods the first being the establishment of local, independent nonprofits of which there are 18 all of whom are members of the international network Partners for Democratic Change International which was formally established under Belgium law in 2004.

After leaving Community Boards, Raymond Shonholtz established PartnersGlobal in 1989. In the promising atmosphere following the downfall of Communism in Central and Eastern Europe, American and other foreign consultants flooded in with short-term training programs and policy recommendations. PartnersGlobal took a different development path. Appreciating that democratic change and civil society building required new and acculturated skills and methods, PartnersGlobal established from 1991 to 1994 six national Centers led by trained, local professionals, whose expertise over time would exceed the need of expatriate consultants. Today, PartnersGlobal is the largest and only global change and conflict management institutional building organization. What began as an experiment within academic institutions is now an expanding, innovative international organization with 18 Centers, a hub in Brussels and one in Washington, D.C., as well as Center and PartnersGlobal programs in another 20 countries. Centers are among the preeminent institutions in their home countries, supporting civil society, inter-ethnic relations, network building, anti-corruption reform, family mediation, youth and women's leadership, local government reform, and a host of other initiatives. PartnersGlobal, the Centers, and PDCI are in a close partnership, pursuing a common mission while maintaining individuality and local independence.

In 2007 The Association for Conflict Resolution's International Section (ACRIS) presented Partners for Democratic Change with the Outstanding Leadership Award in 2007 in recognition of that organization's work building sustainable local capacity to advance civil society and a culture of change and conflict management worldwide. Partners for Democratic Change received the JAMS Foundation's Fourth Annual Warren Knight Award in recognition of effectively managing and resolving conflict and for assisting emerging democracies throughout the world to advance a civil society.

Currently there are 18 Centers, which include operations in 50 countries. These centers provide forums for groups to reconcile differences. Through the Centers, Partners' mission is to contribute to the democratic and economic transitions of many countries. As of 2011, Partners has currently established centers in Albania, Argentina, Bulgaria, Colombia, El Salvador, Georgia, Hungary, Iraq, Jordan, Kosovo, Lebanon, Mexico, Nigeria, Poland, Senegal, Serbia, Slovakia and Yemen.

The Centers focus on promoting and supporting civil society, interethnic relations, network building, anti-corruption reform, family mediation and youth and women's leadership in their home countries. In 2009 Partners Jordan underwent a project to open a co-ed library in the conservative area of Ma'an, with the goal of giving burgeoning youth the "communications in life they need" to be successful.
