= Kadiatou Konaré =

Malian writer, editor and politician (born 1972)

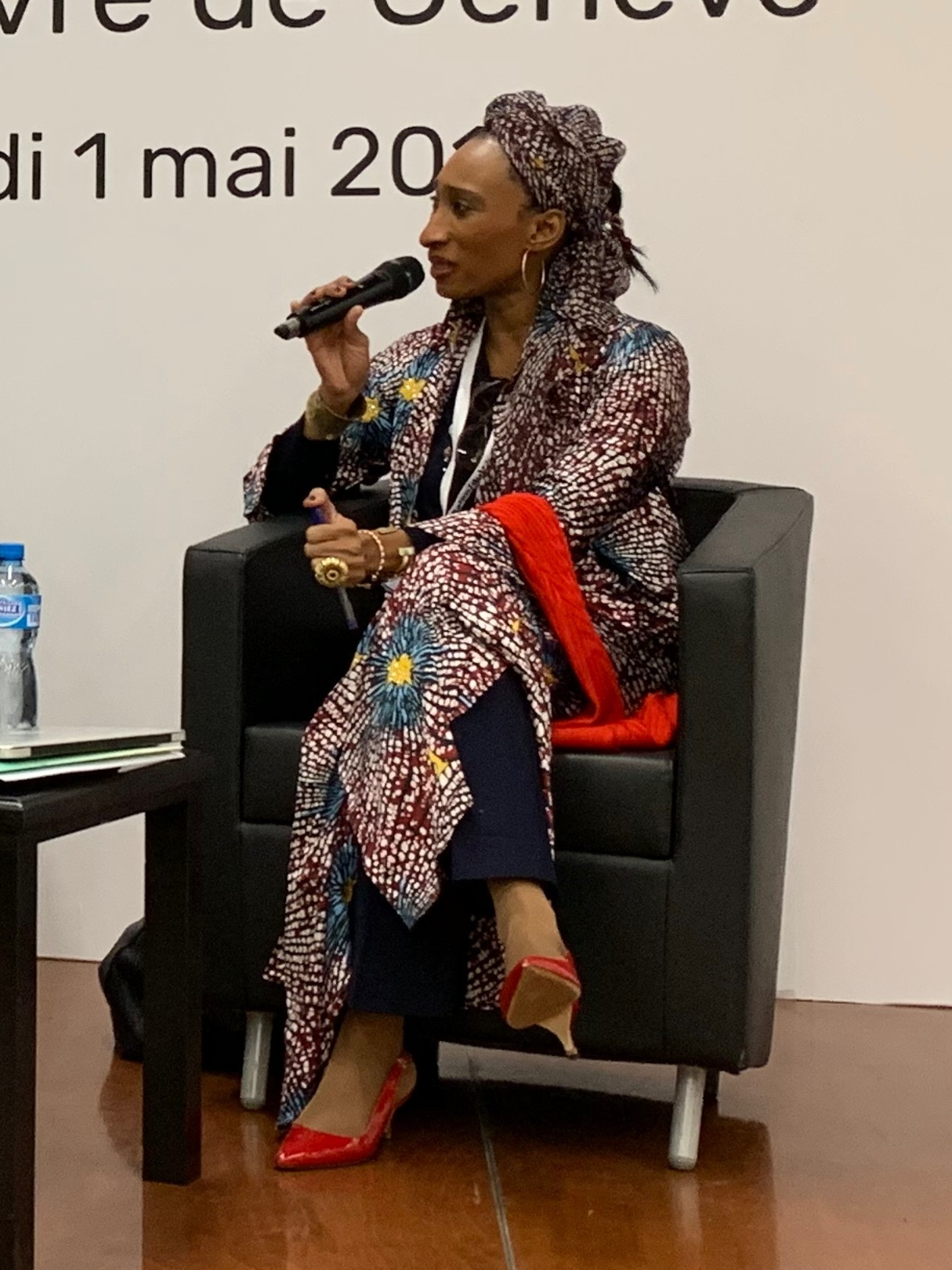
- Kadiatou Konaré in 2019

Minister of Culture, Crafts and Tourism
- In office 6 October 2020 – 21 May 2021
- President: Bah N'Daw
- Prime Minister: Moctar Ouane

Personal details
- Born: 1972 (age 53–54) Warsaw, Polish People's Republic
- Spouse: Tiébilé Dramé (m. 2005; died 2025)
- Parents: Alpha Oumar Konaré; Adame Ba Konaré

Kadiatou Konaré (born 1972) is a Malian writer, editor and politician, Minister of Culture, Crafts and Tourism of Mali between 2020 and 2021 during the interim government of president Bah Ndaw. She is the daughter of former president of Mali Alpha Oumar Konaré and first lady Adame Ba Konaré.

In 2000, she founded the publishing house Cauris Livres.

== Early life ==
Konaré was born in 1972 in Warsaw, Polish People's Republic, as the daughter of Alpha Oumar Konaré and Adame Ba Konaré.

She obtained a master's degree in publishing management from ESCP Business School of Paris, and where she did internships at the publishing houses Hachette Livre and Bayard Presse. She also trained in museology at the Musée de la civilisation in Quebec City, Canada.

== Career ==
In 2001, Konaré founded the publishing house Cauris Livres, which has published award-winning authors such as Tierno Monénembo and Kidi Bebey, and in 2006 she settled permanently in Mali. The publishing house is also known for promoting African figures aimed at teenagers as well as children's stories.

She has co-authored cultural, tourist and artistic guides on Mali and other countries in the region and has also been Haiti's honorary consul in Mali.

Konaré is also a cultural promoter and women's rights activist. In 2010, she organised Nuit de Haïtiin tribute to the victims of the earthquake that devastated the country in 2010 and promoted the work Mars des femmes, chronique d’une révolution malienne (March of Women, Chronicle of a Malian Revolution), directed by Ramata Diaouré.

Following the successful 2020 coup d'état, Kadiatou Konaré was appointed to Prime Minister Moctar Ouane's transitional government as Minister of Culture, Crafts and Tourism on 6 October 2020 and retained her portfolio during the ministerial reshuffle in May 2021, and until the 2021 coup d'état against President Bah N'Daw and Ouane's government.

== Personal life ==
On 3 March 2005 married Tiébilé Dramé, 20 years her older, with whom she had 12 children. He died on 12 August 2025.
