= Adame Ba Konaré =

Malian historian and writer

First Lady of Mali
- In office March 26, 1999 – June 8, 2002
- President: Alpha Oumar Konaré
- Preceded by: Touré Lobbo Traoré
- Succeeded by: Touré Lobbo Traoré

Personal details
- Born: September 22, 1949 (age 77) Ségou, Mali
- Spouse: Alpha Oumar Konaré (m. 1971)
- Children: 4, including Kadiatou Konaré (daughter)
- Occupation: Historian, Feminist, Author

Adame Ba Konaré (born 1 May 1947 in Segu, Mali) is a Malian historian and writer who is married to Alpha Oumar Konaré, former President of Mali. She is active in several causes for newborns and refugees.

== Life ==
Adame Ba Konaré was born in Ségou on 1 May 1947 to Mamadou Ba who was a dentist and his wife Kadiatou Thiam. Her parents hailed from a Fula family. She attended the highest education facility, the École Normale Supérieure in Bamako, along with her future husband, Alpha Oumar Konaré. They married on 15 September 1971. Her new husband was employed as a high school teacher but he was to be sent to the University of Warsaw to undertake doctoral research. They both obtained a PhD in history in 1976. She returned to Mali and became a history professor at her alma mater in Bamako.

Konaré and her husband worked together on several projects. They published a book together in 1983 called Grande Dates Du Mali and they both worked for the democratic cause under the presidency of Moussa Traore who ruled Mali's single party state until 1991. During that time they created a publishing house Jamana and a daily newspaper Les Echos and a political party called ADEMA-PAS. In 1991 president Moussa Traoré was deposed and in the following elections her husband was elected as the first democratically elected president since Mali's independence.

Konaré has written various types of books, from biographies (about Sunni Ali Ber and Ferdinand Duranton) to philosophy (L'Os de la parole) and even a novel (Quand l'ail se frotte a l'encens), the plot of which focuses on the social gap in a fictional society similar to Mali's. For this book, her style has been compared to French authors Emile Zola and Victor Hugo's works.

Although officially retired, she is often invited to conferences on African History. In addition to her work in academia, Adam Ba Konare is also an outspoken feminist, and the founder of one of the few women's museums in Africa. The museum was started in 1987 following the publication of Konaré's book The Dictionary of Famous Women of Mali. The museum, Muso Kunda, is funded by Konaré.

More recently, she has been involved in a project to promote African History, and people are enormously donating to the project following the French president Nicolas Sarkozy's speech in Dakar. The movement aims to write a history of Africa, defending the African legacy and past civilizations. As an historian, Adam Ba Konare disagreed with Sarkozy's speech and invited African historians, intellectuals and all friends of Africa to join to write a rebuttal to Sarkozy's speech in order to denounce "the attacks on African memory".

She is the mother of Kadiatou Konaré, a Malian minister of culture.
