= Abdoulaye Diop (diplomat) =

Malian diplomat (born 1965)

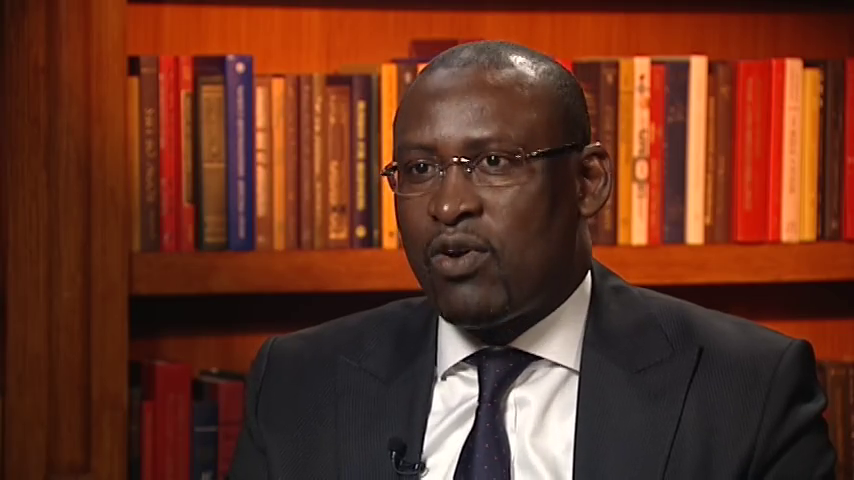
- Diop in 2015

Minister of Foreign Affairs and International Cooperation
- Incumbent
- Assumed office 11 June 2021
- President: Assimi Goita
- Preceded by: Zahabi Ould Sidi Mohamed

Personal details
- Born: 17 September 1965 (age 60) Brazzaville, Republic of the Congo
- Children: 5
- Profession: Diplomat

Abdoulaye Diop (born 17 September 1965) is a Malian diplomat who served as Minister of Foreign Affairs of Mali from 2014 to 2017 and again from 2021 onwards. Previously he was Mali's Ambassador to the United States, appointed to that position in 2003.

== Biography ==
Diop received a Master of Arts in International Relations from the International Institute of Public Administration in Paris, France, a Master of Arts in Diplomacy and Management of International Organizations from the Paris-Sud 11 University, and a Bachelor of Arts in Diplomacy from the National School of Administration of Algeria.

Diop was an adviser to Malian presidents Alpha Oumar Konaré and Amadou Toumani Touré. In 2000 and 2001, Diop oversaw Mali's participation in the United Nations Security Council and served on the steering committee of the New Partnership for Africa's Development (NEPAD).

He was appointed Mali's Ambassador to the United States on 8 September 2003, with accreditation as non-resident to Chile, Mexico, Peru and Uruguay.

Diop was appointed to the government as Minister of Foreign Affairs, African Integration and International Cooperation on 11 April 2014.

== See also ==
- Mali-United States relations
- Foreign relations of Mali
- List of foreign ministers in 2017
- List of current foreign ministers
