= Souleymane Sidibé (politician) =

Malian diplomat and officer (1949–2022)

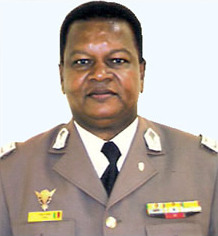

Minister of Internal Security and Civil Protection
- In office June 14, 2002 – May 2, 2004
- President: Amadou Toumani Touré
- Prime Minister: Ahmed Mohamed ag Hamani
- Preceded by: Tiécoura Doumbia
- Succeeded by: Sadio Gassama

Minister of Foreign Affairs
- In office April 5, 1991 – August 26, 1991
- President: Amadou Toumani Touré
- Prime Minister: Soumana Sacko
- Preceded by: N'Golo Traoré
- Succeeded by: Tiébilé Dramé

Personal details
- Born: 24 May 1949 Bamako, French Sudan (now Mali)
- Died: 29 January 2022 (aged 72)

Military service
- Branch/service: National Gendarmerie of Mali
- Rank: Major General

Souleymane Yacouba Sidibé (24 May 1949 – 29 January 2022), also known as Bébél, was a Malian diplomat and officer who served in several ministerial and ambassador positions between 1991 and 2004.

== Early life ==
Sidibé was born on May 24, 1949, in Bamako, then French Sudan. He graduated from the Joint Military School in Koulikoro with future Malian president Amadou Toumani Touré. Between 1984 and 1991, Sidibé served as the Malian ambassador to East Germany, Hungary, and Bulgaria with a residence in Berlin.

== Political service ==
Sidibé participated in the 1991 Malian coup d'état with ATT. Under the Transitional Committee for the Salvation of the People, squadron leader Sidibé served as Minister of Foreign Affairs between April 5 and August 26, 1991. He then served as permanent secretary of the CTSP until the 1992 Malian presidential election. Between 1992 and 1995, Sidibé served as the Malian ambassador to Canada, Mexico, Cuba, Nicaragua, and Venezuela. Between 1995 and 2000, he served as ambassador to Ethiopia, Eritrea, Sudan, Malawi, Kenya, Tanzania, Djibouti, and five other countries including Iraq and Iran. He also served as Mali's permanent representative to the Organisation of African Unity, the United Nations Economic Commission for Africa (ECA), and United Nations Environment Programme.

In 2001, Sidibé was appointed reporter of the UN-OAU commission for inter-Congolese dialogue during the height of the Second Congo War, leading to the signing of the Sun City Agreement. Between 2002 and 2004, he served as Minister of Internal Protection and Civil Security during ATT's rule. Sidibé was also the president of several commissions and national and international meetings, including the Conference on the North in 1997, the National Reconciliation Pact in 1992, and the FAO conference in 2003.

== Military service ==
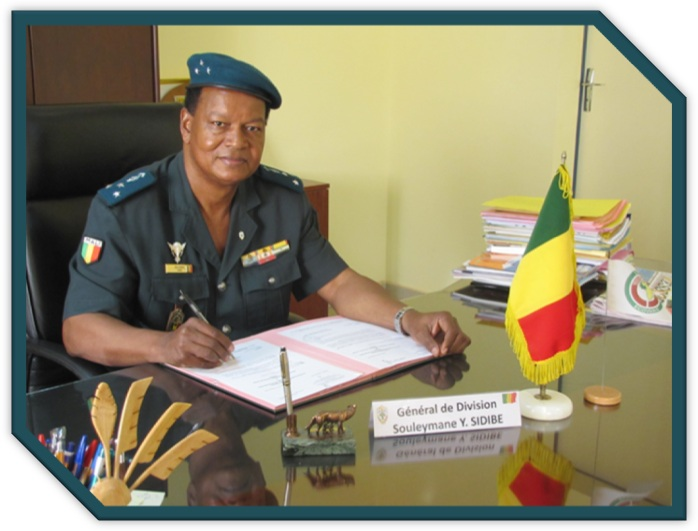
Sidibé, then director of the peacekeeping school

Sidibé was promoted to brigadier general in January 2007. He became director of the Alioune Blondin Beye Peacekeeping School in May of that year. On October 1, 2010, Sidibé was promoted to major general. Between 2014 and sometime before 2022, Sidibé served as director of Mali's National Road Safety Agency.

== Death ==
Sidibé died on January 29, 2022. His funeral took place in Hamdallaye Cemetery at the Gendarmerie camp in Faladié. Malian Prime Minister Choguel Kokalla Maïga was in attendance.
