= Zeïni Moulaye =

Malian politician (born 1954)

Minister of Foreign Affairs

Personal details
- Born: 1954 (age 71–72)

Zeïni Moulaye (born 1954) is a Malian politician. He served as Minister of Foreign Affairs.

He previously served as Minister of Transport and Tourism from 1989 to 1991.
