= Community Boards =

US community-based mediation program

Community Boards is a community based mediation program, established in 1976, in San Francisco, California, United States by Raymond Shonholtz. The program utilizes volunteers from the neighbourhoods of the city, who work with people involved in disagreements toward the end of resolving the dispute, repairing the relationship, and healing or preventing rifts in the community.

The Community Boards program promotes a model of mediation that emphasizes the collective involvement of members of the community, recruiting mediators who are representative of their neighbourhoods—with direct awareness of local needs and concerns. The program utilizes a form of case management in which "case developers" make in–person contact with potential parties in order to encourage participation. Once the parties involved have consented to participate, they are assisted by a panel (usually 3) of mediators.

The program is among the most distant approach to formal legal process among the various models of community mediation. The most dramatic example of this viewpoint is the contention by the program's mediators that any agreement reached should be enforceable only by the good will and voluntary compliance of the parties. Proponents have asserted that the program's impact is much broader than the resolution of individual disputes—reaching into issues of tolerance, acceptance and social justice.

Community Boards has also been active in the promotion of K-12 school-based peer mediation programs since 1982.
