= National Union of Students and Pupils of Mali =

Student movement in Mali

National Union of Students and Pupils of Mali (in French: Union Nationale des Etudiants et des Elèves du Mali) was a student movement in Mali.

UNEEM was founded in January 1979. It was banned by the government.

In early 1980 massive protests erupted over the non-payment of student bourses. In February that year, fire-brand leader Abdul Karim "Cabral" Camara was elected general secretary of UNEEM.

On March 8 UNEEM led a protest march in Bamako outside a summit of states of the Sahara region. Violence broke out, and police killed 13 students. Camara was jailed, and killed in detention. UNEEM was suppressed and ceased to function.
