= Partners for Democratic Change International =

- Founded: August 2006
- Type: NGO network
- Location: Albania, Argentina, Brazil, Bulgaria, Colombia, Czech Republic, El Salvador, Georgia, Hungary, Jordan, Kosovo, Mexico, Peru, Poland, Romania, Senegal, Serbia, Slovakia, Yemen, USA
- Region served: Worldwide
- Method: Civic education, mediation, publication
- Website: PDCI network

Partners for Democratic Change International (PDCI) is a network of partner non-governmental organizations (NGOs) focused on civil and societal reform in their respective countries. Founded under the Partners for Democratic Change (Partners) program, the PDCI has local centers in Europe, the Americas, the Middle East, and Africa. They assist in areas like civil society, good governance, and a culture of change and conflict management worldwide.

== Organization ==
=== PDCI's history ===
Established in 1989, Partners for Democratic Change emerged in response to the seismic shifts occurring in Central and Eastern Europe during that time. In an initial response to these transformative developments, Partners swiftly established centers across diverse regions, spanning Europe, the Americas, the Middle East, and Africa. This strategic approach facilitated the cultivation and reinforcement of sustainable capabilities and local expertise, uniquely positioned to address an array of challenges encompassing governmental, business, and civil society conflicts, disputes, and transformative processes. The organization's primary method of intervention was rooted in mediating processes and meticulously crafted programs.

Partners for Democratic Change functions as an autonomous non-governmental entity. They train a diverse range of individuals, from citizens and government officials to non-governmental activists and corporate leaders. These training initiatives are conducted on national and regional scales, facilitating the dissemination of invaluable knowledge and skills.

A significant milestone in the evolution of the Partners network occurred as early as 1998 when a subsequent generation of organizations associated with Partners for Democratic Change began to take shape. This evolutionary phase witnessed the establishment of coordination mechanisms and exchanges within the network. Building on this foundation, in 2001, the network members collectively ratified the PDCI Charter. This pivotal moment marked the commencement of a tradition wherein members convened three times annually, concurrently contributing to a designated "PDCI Fund."

=== The network secretariat in Brussels ===
In 2006, the members collectively established PDCI, a non-profit association operating under Belgian law. It was underpinned by a resolute commitment to mutual knowledge sharing, expertise dissemination, and skill enhancement. The objective was to fortify each member organization, bolster their endeavors at national, regional, and global levels, and forge a collective front that would facilitate the enrichment of other entities through the propagation of their invaluable work centered around peace, justice, and civil society enhancement on a local scale.

During the mid-2007 timeframe, a central secretariat was inaugurated in Brussels, serving as the administrative hub of the organization.

In the same year, 2007, Partners for Democratic Change received distinguished accolades for their exceptional contributions. The Association for Conflict Resolution's International Section (ACRIS) bestowed upon them the prestigious Outstanding Leadership Award, acknowledging their substantial efforts in cultivating sustainable local capacity to propel civil society progress and foster a culture of transformative change and conflict management on a global scale.

Furthermore, the JAMS Foundation honored Partners for Democratic Change with the Fourth Annual Warren Knight Award in recognition of their adept management and resolution of conflicts and their pivotal role in assisting emerging democracies worldwide in advancing the cause of civil society.
