= Sadio Lamine Sow =

Malian politician (born 1952)

Sadio Lamine Sow (born 9 August 1952, Kayes) was the Minister of Foreign Affairs and International Cooperation of Mali from 24 April to 20 August in 2012.
