= Arouna Modibo Touré =

Malian politician

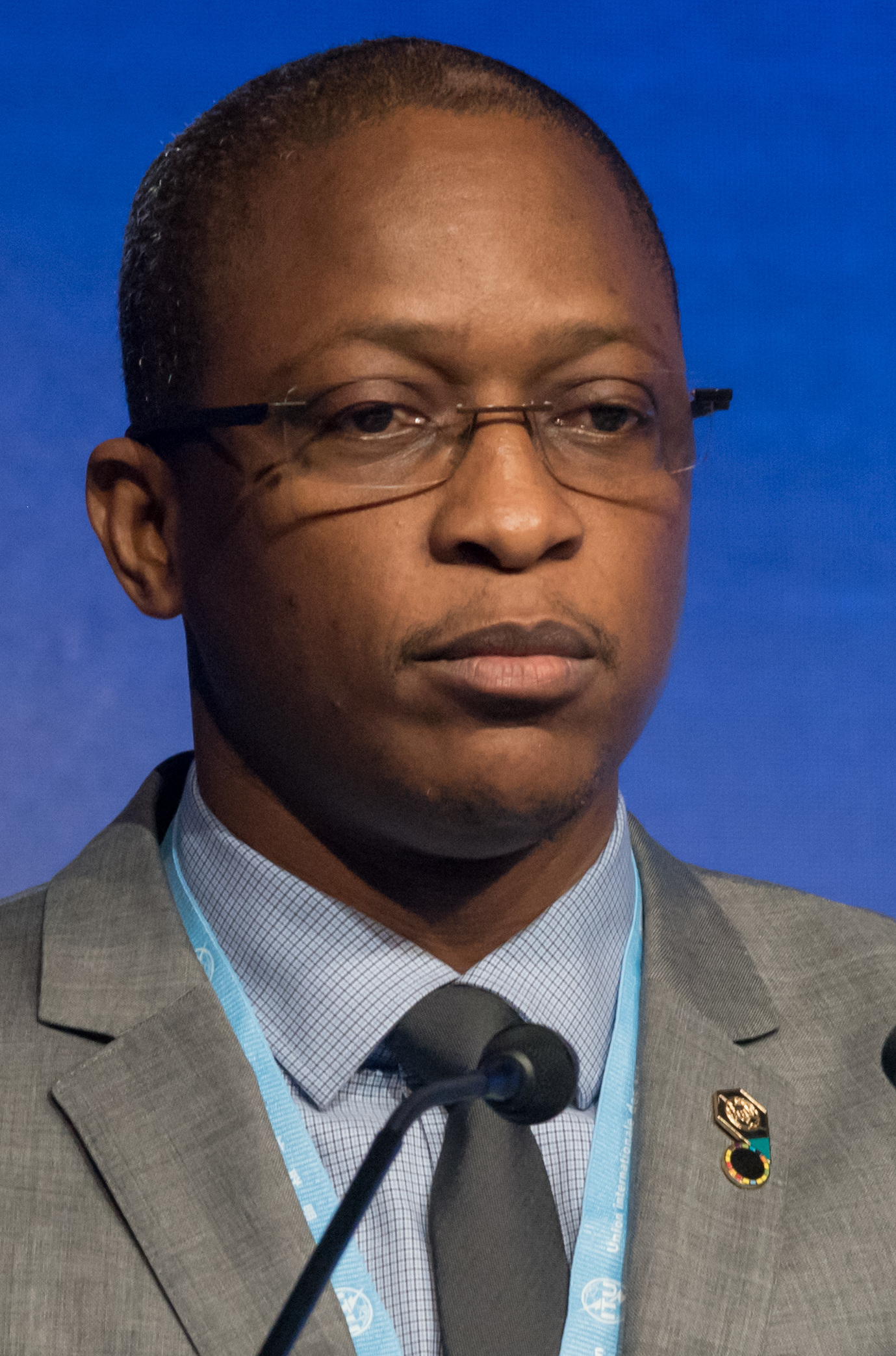
Arouna Modibo Touré

Arouna Modibo Touré is a Malian politician. He was Minister of Youth and Sports of Mali from May 2019 to July 2020, and Minister of the Digital Economy and Communications of Mali from April 2017 to May 2019.

He is suspected of setting up a large-scale corruption system when he was the head of Mali's lottery company (PMU Mali) from 2015 to 2017.

== See also ==
- Politics of Mali
