= Alpha Oumar Konaré =

Malian politician, President from 1992 to 2002

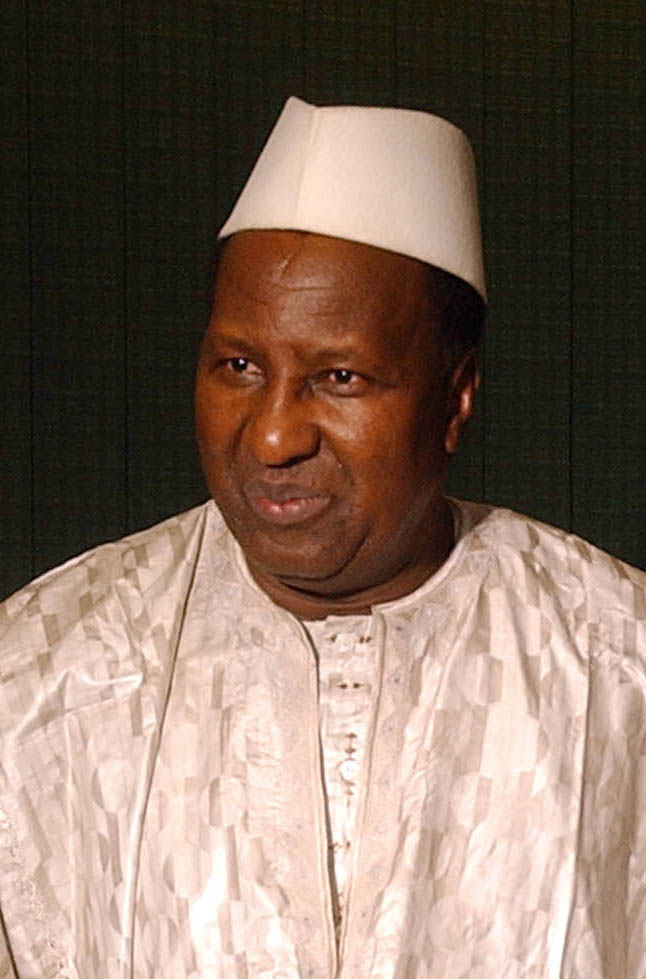
- Konaré in 2007

1st Chairperson of the African Union Commission
- In office 16 September 2003 – 1 February 2008
- Preceded by: Amara Essy (acting)
- Succeeded by: Jean Ping

3rd President of Mali
- In office 8 June 1992 – 8 June 2002
- Preceded by: Amadou Toumani Touré (acting)
- Succeeded by: Amadou Toumani Touré

Personal details
- Born: 2 February 1946 (age 80) Kayes, French Sudan
- Party: ADEMA-PASJ
- Spouse: Adame Ba Konaré
- Children: 4, including Kadiatou Konaré (daughter)
- Education: University of Warsaw, Graduate Institute of International and Development Studies
- Profession: Tutor, teacher, researcher, professor, historian and archaeologist

Alpha Oumar Konaré (born 2 February 1946) is a Malian politician, professor, historian and archaeologist, who served as President of Mali for two five-year terms from 1992 to 2002 and was Chairperson of the African Union Commission from 2003 to 2008.

== Scholarly career ==
Alpha Oumar Konaré, fourth son of a Fula homemaker, was born in Kayes, Mali, where he went to primary school. He went on to attend Bamako's Lycée Terrasson des Fougères, the Collège de Maristes of Dakar, Senegal, the Collège Moderne of Kayes and, between 1962 and 1964, the École Normale Secondaire of Katibougou. He completed his advanced studies in history at the École Normale Supérieure of Bamako (1965–1969), at the University of Warsaw between 1971 and 1975 and, later in life, as a mid-career student at the Graduate Institute of International and Development Studies in Geneva, Switzerland.

He began his professional career as a tutor in Kayes, then a lycée teacher at Markala and Bamako. In 1974, he did research at the Institut des Sciences Humaines du Mali, then, from 1975 to 1978, acted as head of historic patrimony and ethnography at the Ministry of Youth, Sports, Arts, and Culture. In 1980, he was named researcher at the Institut Supérieur de Formation en Recherche Appliquée (I.S.F.R.A), and Professor at the History/Geography department at the Ecole Normale Supérieure of Bamako. In the course of his career, he headed several professional organizations, including the Association of Historians and Geographers of Mali, the West African Association of Archaeologists, and the Union of West African Researchers. Between 1981 and 1992, Konaré served as a consultant for the United Nations Educational, Scientific and Cultural Organization (UNESCO) and the United Nations Development Programme (UNDP). Between 1989 and 1992 he was president of ICOM (International Council of Museums).

== Political activism ==
Konaré was involved in politics as early as the age of twenty, when he was elected the 1967 Secretary General of the Sudanese Union/African Democratic Rally (US-RDA, the party of President Modibo Keïta) of the École Normale Supérieure of Bamako.

Following the coup d'état of General Moussa Traoré, he became an activist for the Marxist-Leninist, clandestine Malian Party for Work (Parti malien du travail, or PMT).

In 1978, however, he accepted a post in Moussa Traoré's government as Minister of Youth, Sports, Arts, and Culture. Though he resigned in 1980, his term was marked by the formation of many Malian sports organizations. He went on to found and direct the cultural review "Jamana" in 1983, as well as the cultural cooperative of the same name. In 1989 he also founded the daily newspaper Les échos, and in 1991 began "Radio Bamakan," Mali's first free radio station.

== ADEMA and presidency ==
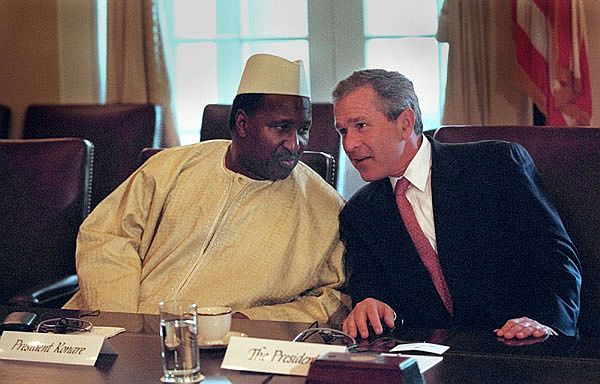
Alpha Oumar Konaré with the American President George W. Bush in 2001

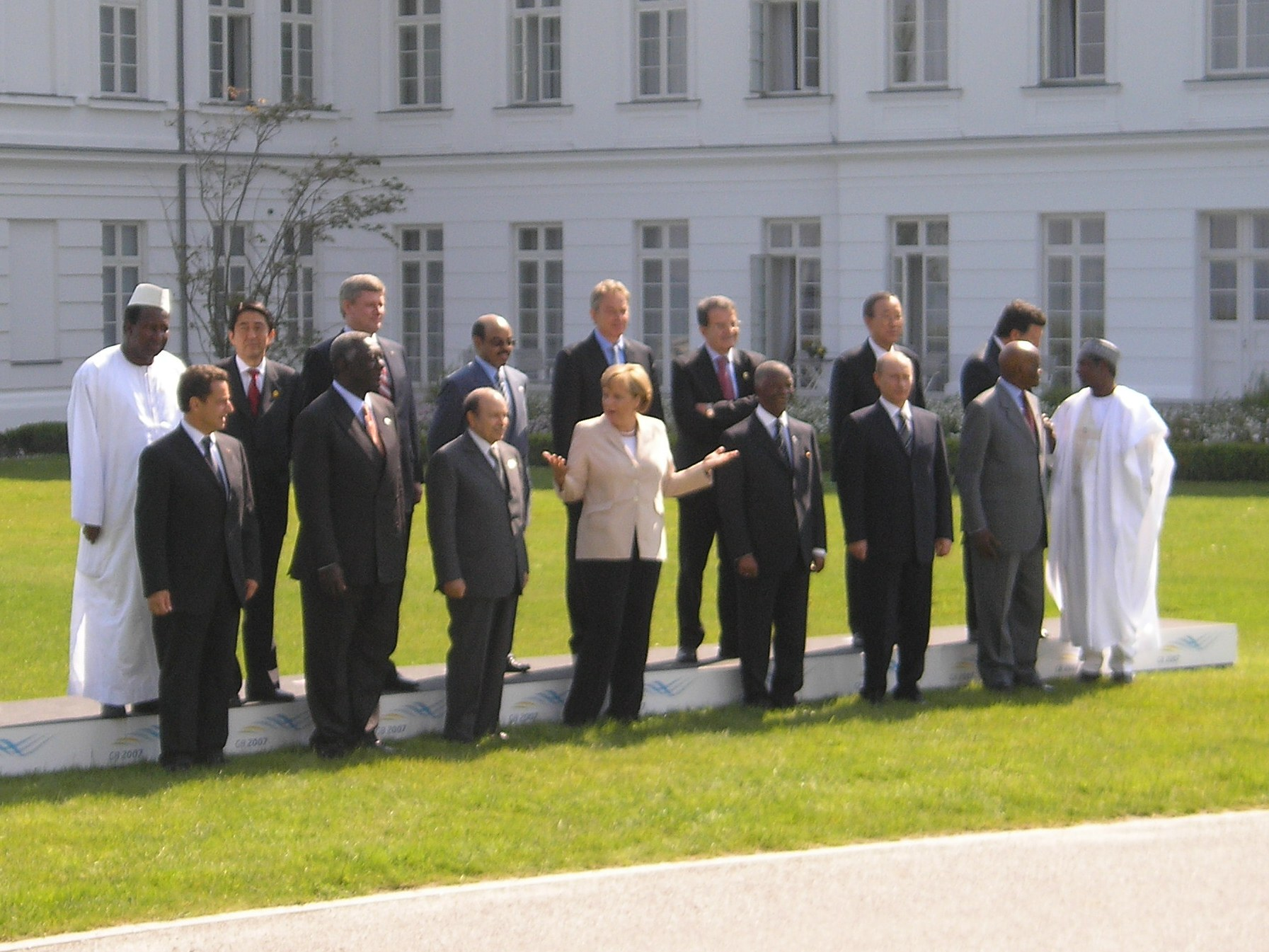
At the 33rd G8 summit in Heiligendamm in 2007 (Konaré at the very left)

In 1990, he participated in the creation of the umbrella movement Alliance for Democracy in Mali (Alliance pour la démocratie au Mali, or ADEMA), which united the PMT with a number of other anti-Traoré groups. With the 1991 fall of Moussa Traoré, Konaré helped transform ADEMA into ADEMA/PASJ, an official political party, and served as its delegate to the 1991 National Conference of Mali.

By the end of the democratic transition instituted by Amadou Toumani Touré, he was elected as Mali's first elected president in 1992, receiving 69.01% of the vote in the second round against US-RDA candidate Tiéoulé Mamadou Konaté. He was re-elected for a second term in the 1997 presidential election despite a boycott of the ballot in protest of his annulment of legislative elections, and he was sworn in on 8 June 1997.

His terms are noted for the restoration of democracy in spite of the 1997 difficulties, his management of the Tuareg Rebellion in the north, and his decentralization of the government. However, corruption remained a significant problem under Konaré's administration.

Konaré publicly rendered homage to Mali's first president, Modibo Keïta, and created a memorial to him in Bamako. Opposed to the death penalty, he commuted the death sentences of Moussa Traoré and his wife to life in prison in 2002. He is also remembered as the man who brought the continent's most prestigious football tournament, the African Cup of Nations, to Mali in 2002.

On the international stage, Konaré worked for peace and integration in the West African region. He served as president of Economic Community of West African States (ECOWAS) in 1999, and of the West African Monetary Union (UEMOA) in 2000.

Term limited to two presidential terms by the constitution, Konaré left office in 2002 and was succeeded by Amadou Toumani Touré. To date, he is the only Malian president to leave office at the end of his term. On 10 July 2003, he was elected as Chairman of the Commission of the African Union (AU) at a summit in Maputo. He was the only candidate; Amara Essy, who held the post in an interim capacity, withdrew his candidacy prior to the vote. 35 countries voted in Konaré's favor; there were six votes against him, while four countries abstained.

Konaré raised the ire of civil society in Zimbabwe when, during a visit to Harare on 14 October 2006, in his capacity as Chairperson of the AU Commission, he declined invitations to meet with representatives of non-governmental organizations to discuss the situation in Zimbabwe.

On 25 January 2007, Konaré said that he did not intend to seek another term as chairman of the AU Commission. On 1 February 2008, Jean Ping of Gabon was elected to succeed him; Ping officially succeeded Konaré as Chairperson of the commission on 28 April 2008.

== After the presidency ==
In September 2021, Alpha Oumar Konaré, was urgently hospitalized in Morocco at Cheikh Zaid Hospital in Rabat.

Political offices
Preceded by Amadou Toumani Touré	President of Mali; 1992 – 2002	Succeeded by Amadou Toumani Touré
Preceded by Gnassingbé Eyadéma	Chairman of the Economic Community of West African States; 1999 – 2001	Succeeded by Abdoulaye Wade
Positions in intergovernmental organisations
Preceded by Amara Essy (interim)	Chairperson of the African Union Commission; 2003 – 2008	Succeeded by Jean Ping
