= Economic, Social and Cultural Council =

Advisory body of the African Union

The Economic, Social and Cultural Council (ECOSOCC) is an advisory body of the African Union designed to give civil society organizations (CSOs) a voice within the AU institutions and decision-making processes. ECOSOCC is made up of civil society organizations from a wide range of sectors including labour, business and professional groups, service providers and policy think tanks, both from within Africa and the African diaspora.

The Interim President of ECOSOCC was Kenyan Nobel Prize winner Prof. Wangari Maathai. In 2008, she was replaced as president by Cameroonian lawyer Akere Muna of the Pan-African Lawyers Union (PALU).

== Legal framework ==
ECOSOCC is provided for in the African Union Constitutive Act, but does not have its own protocol, relying rather on Statutes approved by the AU Assembly. The ECOSOCC Statutes provide for four main bodies:

- A 150-member General Assembly, made up of 144 elected representatives (two from each Member State, ten operating at regional level, eight at continental level and 20 from the diaspora) and six representatives of CSOs nominated by the AU Commission, to be the highest decision-making body of the organ.
- A 15-member standing committee with representatives from the five regions of Africa to coordinate the work of the organ.
- 10 sectoral cluster committees for feeding opinion and inputs into the policies and programmes of the AU.
- A five-person credentials committee for determining the eligibility of CSO representatives to contest elections or participate in the processes of the organ.

The 10 Sectoral Cluster Committees are:

- Peace and Security Committee
- Political Affairs Committee
- Infrastructure and Energy Committee
- Social Affairs and Health Committee
- Human Resources, Sciences and Technology Committee
- Trade and Industry Committee
- Rural Economy and Agriculture Committee
- Economic Affairs Committee
- Women and Gender Committee
- Cross-Cutting Programs Committee

=== Membership criteria ===
The criteria established by the ECOSOCC Statutes for membership include that candidates should:

- Be national, regional, continental or African diaspora CSOs, without restriction to undertake regional or international activities.
- Have objectives and principles that are consistent with the principles and objectives of the Union.
- Be registered in a Member State of the African Union and/or meet the general conditions of eligibility for the granting of observer status to non governmental organizations.
- Show proof that the ownership and management of the CSO is made up of not less than 50% of Africans or African diaspora.
- Show that the resources of the organisation derive at least 50% from contributions of the members of the organization.

The requirements on funding from membership contributions mean that many African NGOs are not eligible for membership of ECOSOCC.

== Establishment ==
Interim ECOSOCC structures were established in 2005. Elections to replace these structures were finally held in 23 African states and at continental level in late 2007. Although elections had not been completed in the remaining countries, the official launch of the new ECOSOCC General Assembly took place in Dar es Salaam, Tanzania on 9 September 2008.

The Citizens and Diaspora Office (CIDO) in the AU Commission acts as secretariat for ECOSOCC.

=== Membership of interim structures ===
The council also has four vice presidents. The interim presidents were:

- Central Africa. M. Maurice Tadajeu
- North Africa. Mme. Fatima Zohra Karadja
- Southern Africa. Mr. Charles Mutasa
- West Africa. Mr. Ayo Aderinwale

The Council also maintains a Standing Committee, whose interim members are listed below:

Central Africa

- Yvette N. Rekangali
- Jean Collins Musonda Kalusambo
- Julienne Mavoungou Makaya

East Africa

- Zainab Kamel Ali
- El Hussein Abdel Galil Mohammed
- Patrick Kayemba

North Africa

- Armany Asfour
- Saida Agrebi
- Ahmed Abdel Fattah

Southern Africa

- Moses Tito Kachima
- Joyce Nondwe Kanyago
- Helder Francisco Malauene

West Africa

- Mama Koite Doumbia
- Landing Badji
- Omar Gassama
