= African Union Commission =

Part of the African Union's executive branch

Agency overview
- Formed: 2002
- Preceding agency: Organization of African Unity (OAU) Secretariat
- Jurisdiction: Africa
- Headquarters: Addis Ababa, Ethiopia
- Employees: Approximately 1,500
- Annual budget: $647.3 million (2024)
- Agency executive: Mahamoud Ali Youssouf, Chairperson
- Parent department: African Union
- Website: au.int/en/commission

The African Union Commission (AUC) acts as the executive/administrative branch or secretariat of the African Union. It is headed by a chairperson and consists of a number of Commissioners dealing with different areas of policy.

The African Union Headquarters are in Addis Ababa, Ethiopia. It should be distinguished from the African Commission on Human and Peoples' Rights, (based in Banjul, Gambia), which is a separate body that reports to the African Union.

== History ==
On September 13, 2005 an agreement was reached by the Commission and France whereby France would donate €5 million for the furtherance of African Union activities. Some of the initiatives this money will go to are an African Communication Policy and an African Common Defence Force. The signatory on behalf of the Commission was Bernard Zoba.

The African Union Commission became a part of the Forum on China–Africa Cooperation (FOCAC) in 2012. FOCAC is the main multi-lateral coordination mechanism between the African countries and China. Since joining FOCAC, the African Union Commission has increasingly played a coordinating role, although each African country in FOCAC continues to represent itself individually.

The African Union has agreed through the signing of an Memorandum of Understanding (MoU) for a Free Trade Agreement to further encompass the Caribbean Community as part of the African diaspora.

== Departments ==
The commission is divided into departments known that can be likened to ministries. A commissioner's portfolio can be supported by numerous sub departments; they prepare proposals for them and if approved by a majority of commissioners proposals go forward to the Parliament and Council for consideration.

- Department of Agriculture, Rural Development, Blue Economy, and Sustainable Environment
- Department of Economic Development, Trade, Tourism, Industry, Mining
- Department of Education, Science, Technology and Innovation
- Department of Political Affairs, Peace and Security
- Department of Infrastructure and Energy
- Department of Health, Humanitarian Affairs and Social Development

== Agencies ==
The agencies of the African Union (AU) are specialized institutions established to implement the AU's objectives of promoting unity, peace, and sustainable development across Africa.

== Key members ==
Elections were held in February 2025 for a new Chairperson, Deputy Chairperson and Commissioners for various departments of African Union Commission.

- Mahamoud Ali Youssouf was elected Chairperson of the Commission.
- Selma Haddadi was elected Deputy Chairperson.
- Bankole Adeoye was re-elected as the Commissioner for the Political Affairs, Peace and Security Department
- Moses Vilakati was elected as the Commissioner of the Agriculture, Rural Development, Blue Economy and Sustainable Environment (ARBE) Department.
- Lerato Mataboge was elected as Commissioner for the Infrastructure and Energy Department.
- Amma Twum-Amoah was elected as the Commission of the Health, Humanitarian Affairs, and Social Development Department.

Two further members of the Commission were elected in July 2025 at a Mid-Year Coordination meeting.

- Francisca Tatchouop Belobe was elected Commissioner of the Economic Development, Trade, Tourism, Industry, and Minerals (ETTIM) Department.
- Gaspard Banyankimbona was elected Commissioner of the Education, Science, Technology, and Innovation (ESTI) Department.

== Former members of the commission ==
- Directorate of Conference Management and Publications was previously headed by Nedjat Khellaf
- Directorate of Peace and Security was previously headed by Ramtane Lamamra
- Directorate of Political Affairs was previously headed by Julia Dolly Joiner
- Directorate of Infrastructure and Energy was previously headed by Elham Mahmood Ibrahim
- Directorate of Social Affairs was previously headed by Amira El Fadil
- Directorate of Human Resources, Science and Technology was previously headed by Nagia Essayed
- African Union High Representative for Infrastructure Development was Raila Odinga from October 2018. Prior to this, the Directorate of Trade and Industry was headed by Elisabeth Tankeu.
- Directorate of Rural Economy and Agriculture was previously headed by Rosebud Kurwijila
- Directorate of Economic Affairs was previously headed by Maxwell Mkwezalamba
- Office of the Legal Counsel was previously headed by Ben Kioko
- Commissioner for Agriculture, Rural Development, Blue Economy and Sustainable Environment was previously Josefa Sacko

== Finances ==
The African Union Commission (AUC) operates on a budget funded through contributions from its member states as well as international partners. The budget supports the Commission's administrative functions, peacekeeping operations, development programs, and other initiatives aligned with the African Union's strategic objectives.

=== Annual Budget ===
Below is a summary of the AUC's annual budgets over recent years:

- 2021: $623.2 million
- 2022: $637.9 million
- 2023: $641.1 million
- 2024: $647.3 million

The budget reflects incremental increases to support expanded operations, including initiatives in peace and security, socio-economic development, and institutional capacity building.

=== Member State Contributions ===
Member states contribute to the AUC's budget based on an assessed contribution formula that considers factors such as the size of their economies. Contributions are categorized into three tiers:

1. Tier 1: Major contributors, including countries such as Nigeria, South Africa, Egypt, and Algeria, contribute a significant share of the budget.
2. Tier 2: Middle-income countries contribute a moderate share.
3. Tier 3: Least Developed Countries (LDCs) contribute a smaller, more manageable share.

The African Union has also adopted a 0.2% levy on eligible imports to finance its budget independently and reduce reliance on external donors. However, compliance with the levy varies across member states, affecting the overall contribution landscape.
