= Gassama =

Gassama may refer to:

- Bakary Gassama (born 1977), Gambian football referee
- Karamba Gassama (born 2005), Gambian footballer
- Lamine Gassama (born 1989), Senegalese footballer
- Malando Gassama (1946–1999), Gambian percussionist
- Omar Gassama, Gambian politician
- Sadio Gassama (born 1954), Brigadier General of the Malian military
- Saihou Gassama (born 1993), Gambian footballer
- Yaye Kène Gassama, Senegalese plant scientist
