= Djiboutians =

People living in or from Djibouti

Djiboutians Djiboutiens جيبوتيون
- Flag of Djibouti

Total population
- c. 1,000,000

Regions with significant populations
- Djibouti: 994,974
- France: 7,515
- Ethiopia: 3,439
- Canada: 2,405
- Saudi Arabia: 1,850
- Belgium: 1,464
- Sweden: 457
- United Kingdom: 451

Languages
- Somali, Afar, Arabic (Taʽizzi-Adeni), French

Religion
- Islam (Sunni · Sufism) 94%; others (mostly Christians) 6%

Related ethnic groups
- Eritreans • Ethiopians • Somalis

The Djiboutians (French: Djiboutiens, Arabic: جيبوتيون) are the native inhabitants of Djibouti, as well as the global diaspora of Djibouti. The country is mainly composed of two ethnic groups, the Issa Somali and the Afar. It has many languages - though Somali and Afar are the most widely spoken ones, Arabic and French serve as the official languages. There is a small Djiboutian diaspora in North America, Europe, Middle East, Asia and Australia.

== Demographics ==
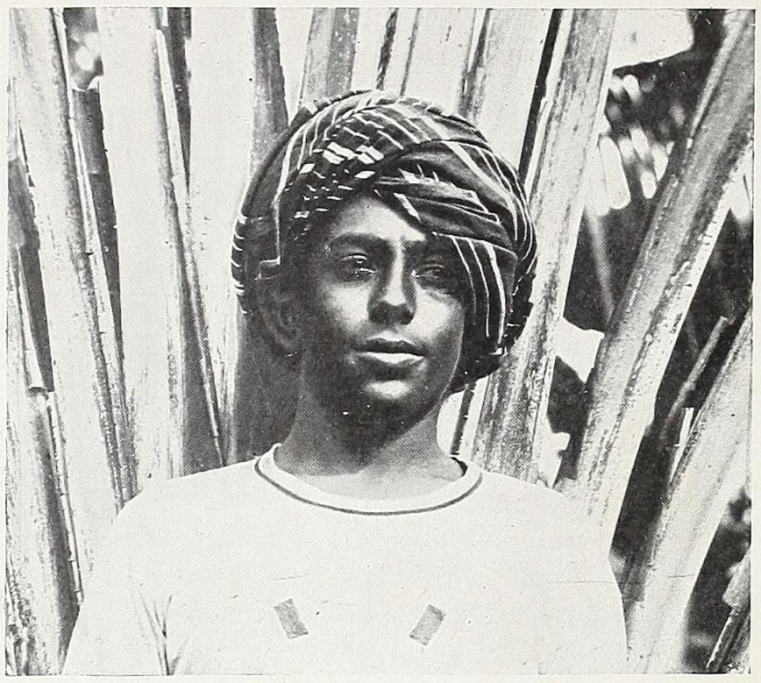
A Somali boy from Djibouti wearing a traditional turban

Djibouti has a population of about 884,017 inhabitants. It is a multiethnic country. The local population grew rapidly during the latter half of the 20th century, increasing from about 69,589 in 1955 to around 869,099 by 2015. The two largest ethnic groups are the Somalis (60%) and Afars (35%). The Somali clan component is mainly composed of the Issa, followed by the Gadabuursi and the Isaaq. The remaining 5% of Djibouti's population primarily consists of Djiboutian Arabs, Ethiopians and Europeans (French and Italians). Approximately 76% of local residents are urban dwellers; the remainder are pastoralists.

Ethnic composition of Djibouti 1927 - 2016
1927	Population	1983	Population	2016	Population
Somali	32,287	Somali	250,500	Somali	524,000
Afar	48,520	Afar	175,100	Afar	306,000
Arabs	4,135	Arabs	30,000	Arabs	59,000
(France) French Somaliland	84,942	Djibouti	455,600	Djibouti	846,687

== Culture ==
Djiboutians' culture is primarily rooted in Somali and Afar traditions. They speak different Cushitic languages, which are part of the larger Afro-Asiatic language family. Historically, they have been nomadic pastoralists. However, recently the population has become urbanized - today, more than half live in the capital, along with the nearby towns and villages of the interior. Poetry has been traditionally recited in the villages by special readers called gabaye. This was a way of recording the community's history and customs, as well as current events.

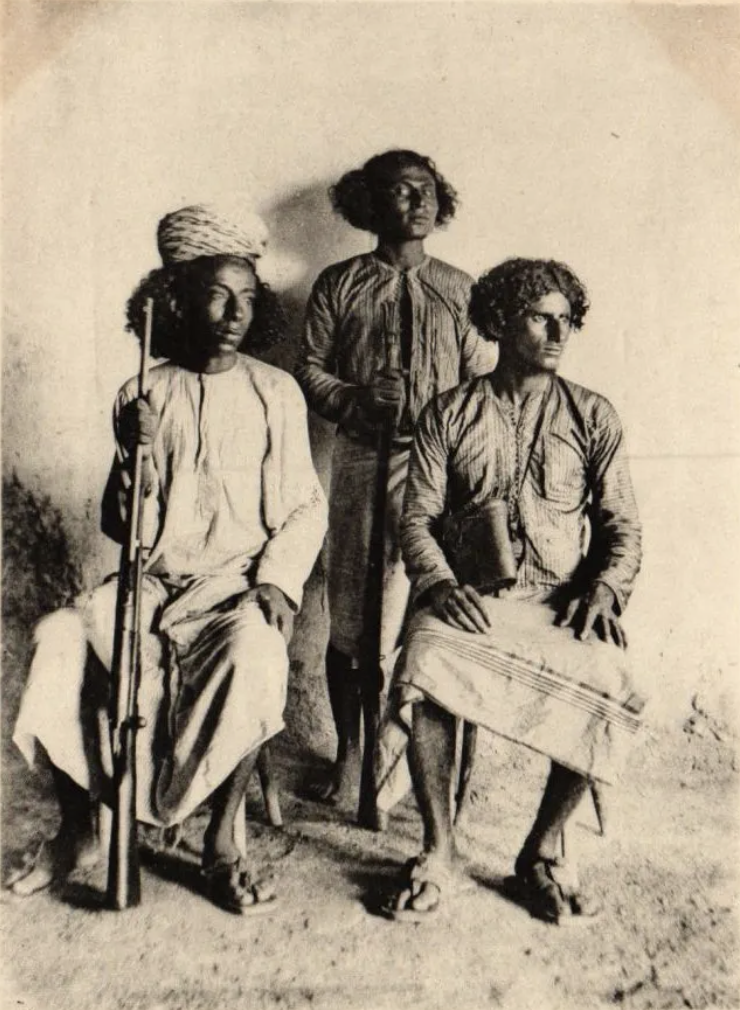
Djiboutian Arab warriors in their native attire

=== Cuisine ===
Djiboutian cuisine is a mixture of Somali, Afar, Yemeni, and French cuisine, with some additional South Asian (especially Indian) culinary influences. Local dishes are commonly prepared using Middle Eastern spices, ranging from saffron to cinnamon. Spicy dishes come in many variations, from the traditional Fah-fah or "Soupe Djiboutienne" (spicy boiled beef soup), to the yetakelt wet (spicy mixed vegetable stew). Xalwo (pronounced "halwo") or halva is a popular confection eaten during festive occasions, such as Eid celebrations or wedding receptions. Halva is made from sugar, corn starch, cardamom powder, nutmeg powder, and ghee. Peanuts are sometimes added to enhance texture and flavour. After meals, homes are traditionally perfumed using incense (cuunsi) or frankincense (lubaan), which is prepared inside an incense burner referred to as a dabqaad.

=== Music ===
Djiboutian music has Somali and Afar roots. Most Somali songs follow the pentatonic scale. That is, they only use five pitches per octave in contrast to a heptatonic (seven note) scale, often found in Western music. Somali music could be mistaken, when it is first heard, for the sounds of nearby regions such as Ethiopia, Sudan or the Arabian Peninsula, but it is ultimately recognisable by its unique tunes and styles. Traditional Afar music resembles the folk music of other parts of the Horn of Africa such as Ethiopia; it also contains elements of Arabic music. The history of Djibouti is recorded in the poetry and songs of its nomadic people, and goes back to a time when the peoples of Djibouti traded hides and skins for the perfumes and spices of ancient Egypt, India, and China. Afar Oral Literature is also quite musical. Popular Djiboutian musicians include Nima Djama, Abdo Xamar Qoodh, Mohamed Ali Fourchette, Abdallah Lee, Shay Lia, and Xabiiba Cabdilaahi.

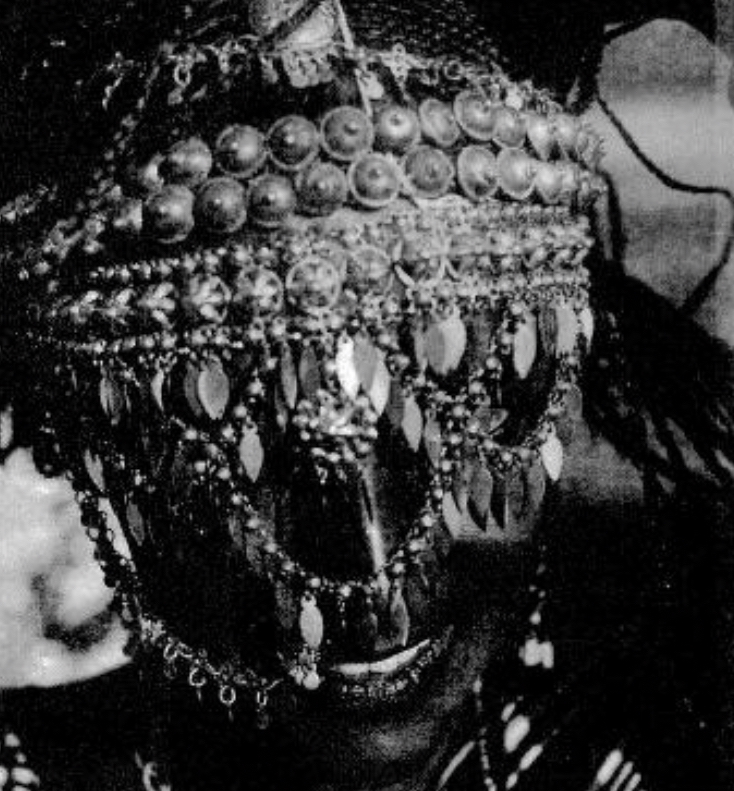
An Afar woman adorning herself with a golden headdress

=== Cinema ===
Storytelling is an ancient custom in Djiboutian culture. This tradition is continued by a love of cinema. The earliest forms of public film display in Djibouti were in French. In the 1920s, the first local movie theatres opened, during a time when Djibouti City began to grow in size. Film theatres became a place where local residents could watch movies in a relaxed atmosphere. With the development of the local film industry, additional theatres were launched. Among these establishments were the Eden in 1934, Olympia in 1939, Le Paris in 1965, and Al Hilal in 1975.

During the 1970s, the capital city had five movie theatres, with one in each district. A few local attempts at shooting films were also concurrently carried out with the participation of local actors. One of these was Burta Djinka, a film in Somali directed by G. Borg in 1972. Following independence in 1977, a growing number of government-owned production and distribution companies as well as actual projection theatres sprang up.

In the 1990s two of the biggest cinemas, Odeon and Olympia, closed their doors.

== Languages ==
The languages of Djibouti include Arabic and French (official), and Somali and Afar (primary), which are the mother tongues of the Somali and Afar ethnic groups, respectively. Both languages belong to the larger Afroasiatic family.

== Religion ==
Religion in Djibouti (2016)
1. Islam (94.0%)
2. Other (6.00%)

Islam entered the region very early on, as a result of the increase in trade with Muslim traders in the Red Sea region. In 1900, during the early part of the colonial era, there were virtually no Christians in the area, with only about 100–300 followers coming from the schools and orphanages of the few Catholic missions in French Somaliland. Islam is the driving force for unity among the various ethnic groups from different parts of the country, and has significantly shaped the values and traditions of Djibouti.

== Notable Djiboutians ==
- Hassan Gouled Aptidon, first President of Djibouti from 1977 to 1999
- Mahmoud Harbi, Vice-President of the Government Council of French Somaliland
- Ahmed Dini Ahmed, Prime Minister of Djibouti from 1977 to 1978
- Dileita Mohamed Dileita, Prime Minister of Djibouti from 2001 to 2013
- Hussein Ahmed Salah, Marathon runner
- Jamal Abdi Dirieh, Athlete
- Ayanleh Souleiman, Professional athlete
- Mouna-Hodan Ahmed, Novelist
- Lula Ali Ismaïl, Djiboutian-Canadian film director
- Roda Ali Wais, Athlete
- Zeinab Kamel Ali, Politician
- Abdourahman Waberi, Novelist
- Abdo Xamar Qoodh, Musician
- Ismail Hassan, Footballer
- Abdi Waiss Mouhyadin, Athlete
- Daher Ahmed Farah, Politician
- Youssouf Hiss Bachir, Athlete
- Ahmed Goumane-Roble, Politician
- Abdourahman Waberi, Novelist
- Nima Djama, Musician
- Hasna Mohamed Dato, Politician
- Mumin Gala, Athlete
- Omar Farah Iltireh, Politician
- Souad Kassim Mohamed, Linguist
- Yacin Elmi Bouh, Politician
- Aden Robleh Awaleh, President of the National Democratic Party
- Mohamed Ali Fourchette, Musician
- Shanice Dileita Mohamed, Musician
- Moumin Bahdon Farah, Politician
- Hassan Phills, Comedian
- Olivier Rousteing, Fashion designer
