= Trade and Industry Committee =

Trade and Industry Committee may refer to:

- Philippine House Committee on Trade and Industry, a standing committee of the Philippine House of Representatives
- Trade and Industry Committee (African Union), a committee of the African Union
- Trade and Industry Committee (House of Commons), a former committee of the British House of Commons

== See also ==
- Committee on Industry and Trade, a committee set up to study the United Kingdom's economic decline following World War I
- Industry and Trade Committee (Sweden), a standing committee of the Riksdag
