= Political Affairs Committee =

Political Affairs Committee may refer to:

- Political Affairs Committee (African Union), a committee of the African Union
- Political Affairs Committee (British Guiana), a political party in British Guiana
