= Sadio Gassama =

Malian politician (born 1954)

Minister of Defence and Veterans Affairs
- In office 2 February 2012 – April 2012
- Prime Minister: Cissé Mariam Kaïdama Sidibé
- Preceded by: Natie Pleah
- Succeeded by: Yamoussa Camara

Minister of Internal Security and Civilian Protection
- In office May 2004 – 2012
- Prime Minister: Modibo Sidibé
- Succeeded by: Tiéfing Konaté

Personal details
- Born: 1954 (age 71–72) Gory, Yélimané Cercle, French Sudan (present-day Mali)
- Awards: Officer of the National Order of Mali; Cross of Valor (Mali); Commander of the Order of Merit; National Order of Togo; National Order of the Ivory Coast

Military service
- Allegiance: Mali
- Branch/service: Malian Army
- Years of service: 1975-present
- Rank: Brigadier general
- Commands: Chief of Staff of the Army; Chief of Staff of the Guard
- Battles/wars: 2012 Malian coup d'état

Sadio Gassama (born 1954), is a brigadier general in the Malian military. Prior to the 2012 Mali coup d'état, he was the Minister of Internal Security and Civilian Protection and he was reappointed to the cabinet in December, remaining such a minister. On 21 March, he attempted to appease the mutinying soldiers at an army base near the capital of Bamako, but failed to win over the troops in his speech, an incident cited by international news sources as sparking the coup.

He was met with boos and stones were thrown at his car. He was then sequestered, at which point his guards riposted by firing warning shots in the air. The minister was released thanks to the intervention of the Kati zone commander ("commandant de zone"). The soldiers then stormed the weapons and ammunition reserves of the camp. Two soldiers were injured, but the presidency said Gassama was neither injured nor arrested. He briefly served as Defense Minister from February to April 2012.

According to Gassama's official biography, his hobbies include athletics and reading. He speaks French, Russian, Soninke, and Bambara.
