= Landing Badji =

Senegalese politician

Landing Badji is a Senegalese politician and a member of the Economic, Social and Cultural Council (ECOSOCC) of the African Union, representing West Africa.

Badji is also chairman of the Political Affairs Committee, one of the 10 Sectoral Cluster Committees of the African Union, and is a director of ANRAC (l'Agence nationale pour la relance des activités économiques et sociales en Casamance), dedicated to the development of the Senegalese region of Casamance.
