= Alternative Forces for the Renewal and Emergence of Mali =

Political party in Mali

Alternative Forces for Renewal and Emergence Forces Alternatives pour le Renouveau et l'Émergence
- Abbreviation: FARE
- Leader: Modibo Sidibé
- Founded: 2013
- Dissolved: 13 May 2025
- Split from: Alliance for Democracy and Progress
- Headquarters: Bamako, Mali

Alternative Forces for Renewal and Emergence (French: Forces Alternatives pour le Renouveau et l'Émergence), commonly known as FARE, was a political party in Mali. The party was founded in 2013 and was closely associated with former prime minister Modibo Sidibé. It took part in Mali’s post-2012 coup electoral politics and held seats in the National Assembly during the 2013-2020 parliamentary term.

FARE was dissolved in May 2025 after Mali’s transitional authorities issued a decree abolishing all political parties in the country.

== History ==
FARE was established in 2013 in the aftermath of Mali’s 2012 political crisis and military coup. The party positioned itself as part of the opposition landscape during the return to constitutional rule and supported Modibo Sidibé’s political ambitions, including his participation in national elections and opposition coalitions.

== Electoral performance ==
In the 2013 legislative elections, FARE won six seats in Mali’s 147-member National Assembly. The election marked Mali’s return to an elected legislature following the coup, with the presidency and its allies securing a majority overall.
