= Patrick Kayemba =

Ugandan politician

- Born: Patrick Kayemba; Uganda
- Occupations: Politician, Businessman, Diplomat
- Known for: Politics, Diplomat

Patrick Kayemba is a Ugandan politician and diplomat. He serves as a member of the African Union's Economic, Social and Cultural Council, representing East Africa. He is also Chairman of the Rural Economy and Agriculture Committee, one of the ten Sectoral Cluster Committees of the African Union.

His early professional work focused on social development, which later contributed to his involvement in local governance and politics.

Kayemba pursued higher education at Nkumba University between 2004 and 2006. His professional and civic activities preceded his entry into elective politics and his subsequent service in Local government.
