= Musonda =

Musonda is a surname. Notable people with the surname include:

- Charles Musonda (born 1969), Zambian footballer
- Charly Musonda (born 1996), Belgian footballer
- Christopher Musonda (born 1986), Zambian football player
- Frankie Musonda (born 1997), English footballer
- Jean Collins Musonda Kalusambo, Zambian administrator
- Joseph Musonda (born 1977), Zambian footballer
- Lamisha Musonda (born 1992), Belgian footballer
- Lydia Musonda Kasangala (born 1988), Congolese handball player
- Lubambo Musonda (born 1995), Zambian footballer
- Monica Musonda (born c. 1976), Zambian businesswoman and lawyer
- Trevor Selwyn Musonda Mwamba, Botswana Anglican bishop

It could also refer to the Musonda Falls in Zambia
