= Saida Agrebi =

Tunisian politician

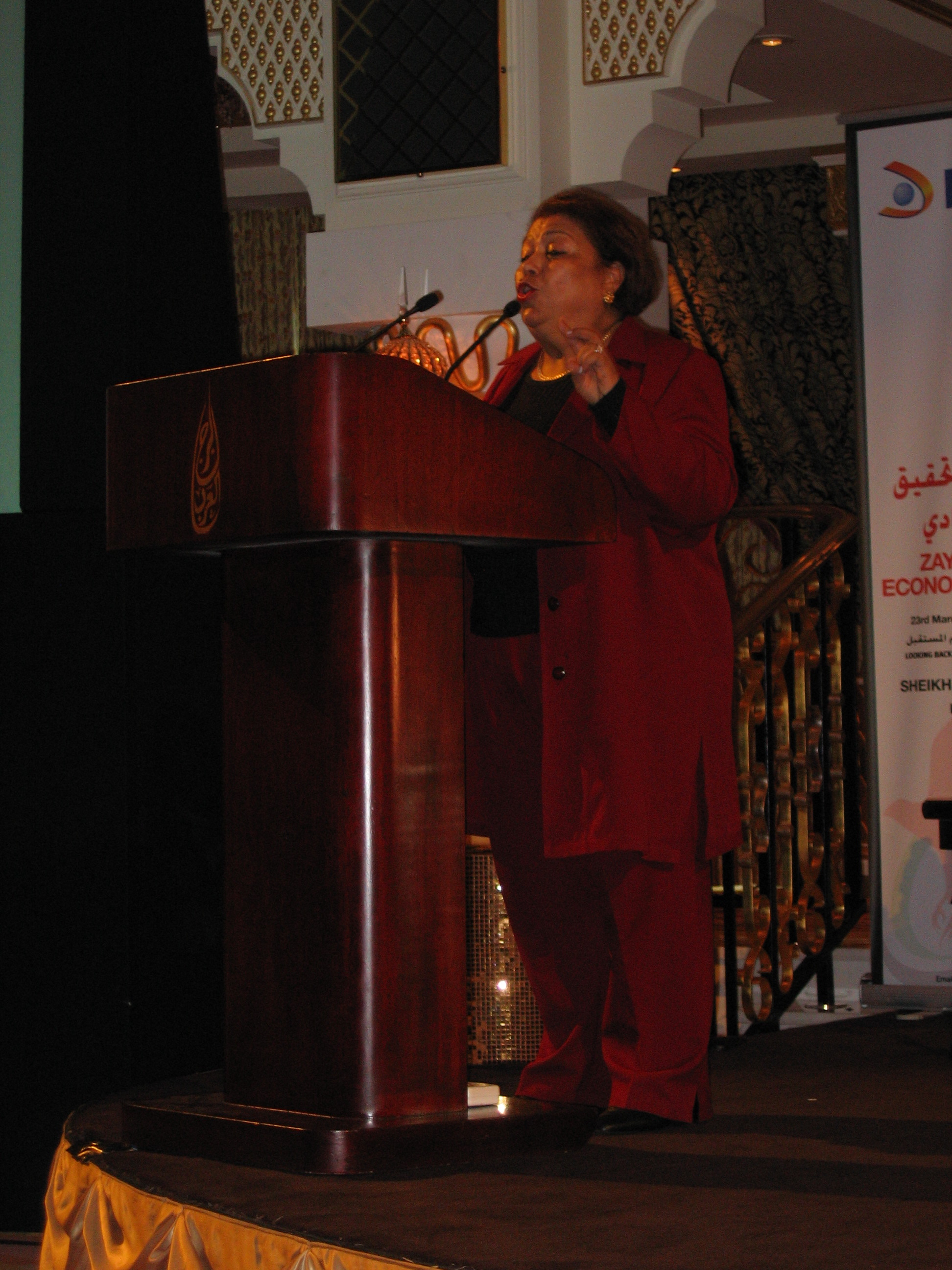

Member of the Pan-African Parliament
- Constituency: Tunisia

Member of the Economic, Social and Cultural Council of the African Union
- Constituency: North Africa

Deputy in the Chamber of Deputies of Tunisia
- Incumbent
- Assumed office 1999

Personal details
- Born: January 22, 1945 (age 81) Tunisia
- Education: University of California, Berkeley

Saida Agrebi (born January 22, 1945, in Tunisia) is a member of the Economic, Social and Cultural Council of the African Union, representing North Africa. She also sits on the Pan-African Parliament representing Tunisia. She graduated from the University of California, Berkeley with a master's degree in Public Health.

== Biography ==
As a student she served as an instructor on reproductive and family health in hospitals in California and Maryland, instructor of public health in Native-American reservations in the state of Arizona, and lecturer on reproductive health in Jamaica.

Ms Agrebi joined the Arab Labour Organisation where she served as the Director of the Bureau of the Arab Working Woman until 1987. She was appointed Director of Communication at the National Office for Family and Population, and then promoted to Deputy Director General in which capacity she served until 1995. In 1995 she acted as Deputy Director General of the Office of Tunisians Abroad, before being elected as Deputy in the Chamber of Deputies of Tunisia in 1999.

As an expert on various topics, including reproductive and public health, women’s rights, civil society and emigration, Ms Agrebi has participated in various UN events. She has also published various articles on women in the work place, Arab women, rural women, and family planning in English, French and Arabic.

In 2003, after the AWCPD’s successful lobbying to mainstream gender in the AU, Ms Agrebi was one of the five women elected to the AU Commission at the Second General Assembly in Maputo, Mozambique.

Besides being a member of the AWCPD, Ms Agrebi is a member of many other organisations, including the vice-presidency of FEMNET, the vice-presidency of the World Organisation of the Family, membership in Femmes Africa Solidarité, and founding presidency of the International Arab Women’s Forum, the Tunisian Mothers’ Association and the Organisation of Magreb Mothers.

She has garnered many accolades for her work, with President Ben Ali of Tunisia presenting the latest one.

== See also ==
- List of members of the Pan-African Parliament
