= Yvette Ngwevilo Rekangalt =

Gabonese businesswoman and lawyer

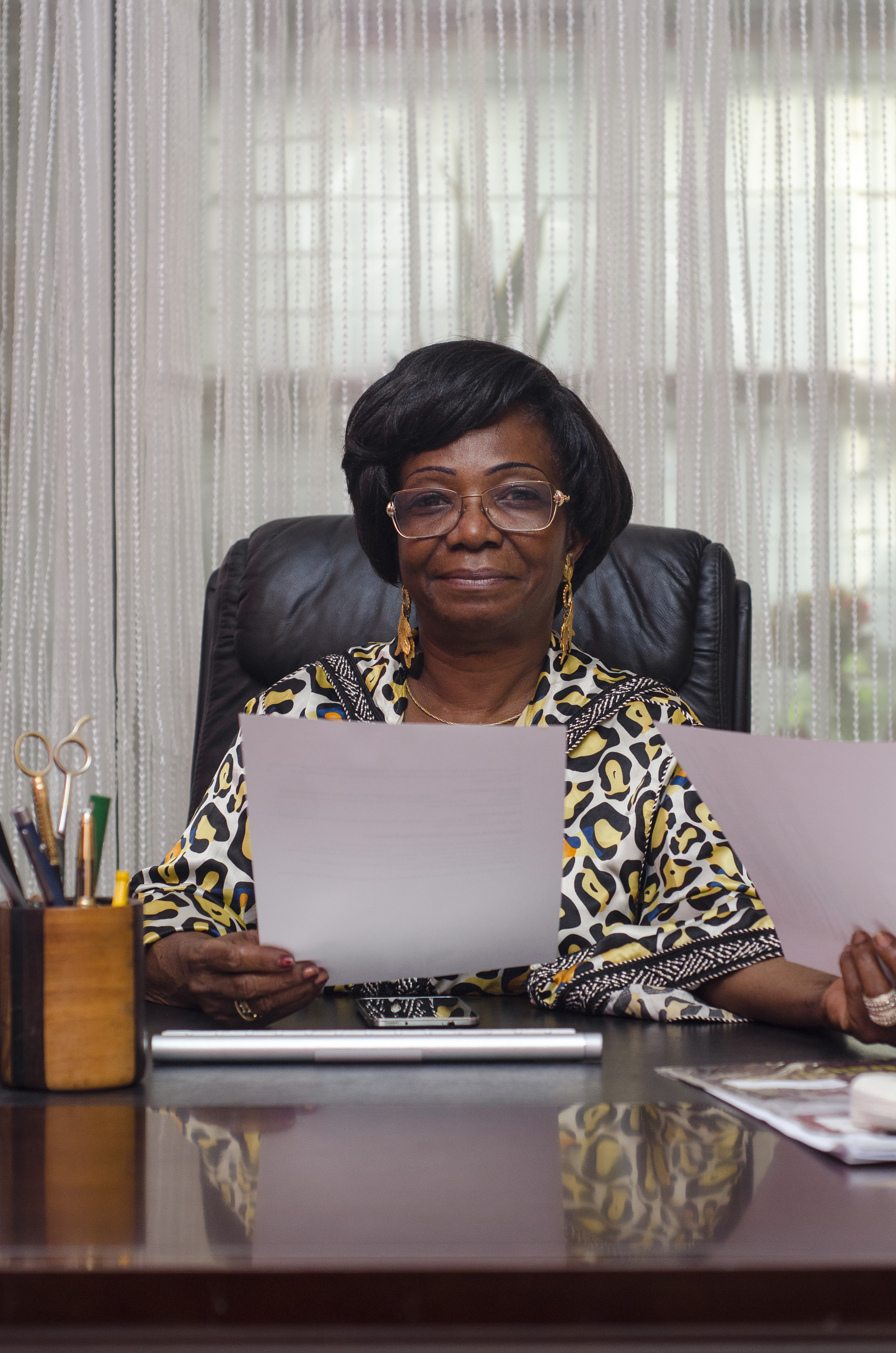
- Yvette Rekangalt in her Libreville office in 2014
- Born: Yvette Ngwevilo Rekangalt; June 26, 1956 (age 70); Enyonga, near Port-Gentil in Gabon, Central Africa
- Education: Law at Université Paris 1 - Panthéon Sorbonne
- Occupations: Bankruptcy lawyer; Human rights leader; Negotiator; Process communication expert; Politics

Yvette Ngwevilo Rekangalt is a Gabonese businesswoman, bankruptcy lawyer (law administrator) for the court of Libreville, and human rights leader. She worked for 25 years as a jurist in the oil and gas industry. She has been a member of the African Union's Economic, Social and Cultural Council representing Central Africa for three terms, as well as chairperson of the Infrastructure and Energy Committee. She ran for office during the 2009 Gabonese election before vanishing from the political scene after the results. She is still very active in business and social activities.

== Education ==
She studied law at Université Paris 1 - Panthéon Sorbonne.

== Early life ==
Yvette Ngwevilo Rekangalt comes from Enyonga, a village on the Ogooué river in Ogooué-Maritime Province. She comes from a very humble background and has lived in poverty which has made her a persistent businesswoman.

Her older brother, Martin Rekangalt, held a high ranking position in the Gabonese SENAT after his diplomatic career as ambassador in Belgium and head of the Gabonese mission to the European Commission.

== Early career ==
She started her career in oil and gas with Elf (later became Total S.A.) in its headquarters in Paris. She was then muted to Port-Gentil before settling in the country's headquarter in Libreville. She stayed 22 years at Total Gabon, where she was in charge of oil and gas contracts, internal and external relations, before starting her consulting company.

== Consultancy role ==
Yvette Ngwevilo played has been a support consultant for a number of local and international organizations such as the NEPAD, the World Bank, the World Health Organization, and the International Center for Trade and International Development.

== Current activities ==
Subsequent to starting her consulting firm, Yenore in Gabon and France, Yvette Ngwevilo Rekangalt was sworn in as bankruptcy trustee for the Law Court of Libreville on August 13th.

== Associations ==
- Member of the Interim Standing Committee (ECOSOCC) of the African Union.
- President of the National Planned Parenthood Federation
- Former President of the Economical, Cultural and Social Council
- Président of Sauvegarde de l'Enfance - SOS Mwana
- Nation and Regional Committee for Negotiations of the economical partnerships agreements member for seven years
- Steering committee member of the program Gabon 2025
- Served one term as the African Union's Economic, Social and Cultural Council member
- Served three mandates at Gabonese National Economic, Social and Cultural Council
- Member of the African Women's Development and Communication Network
- Founding member of the Gabonese National Association of Women Lawyers
