= Bernard Zoba =

Republic of the Congo diplomat

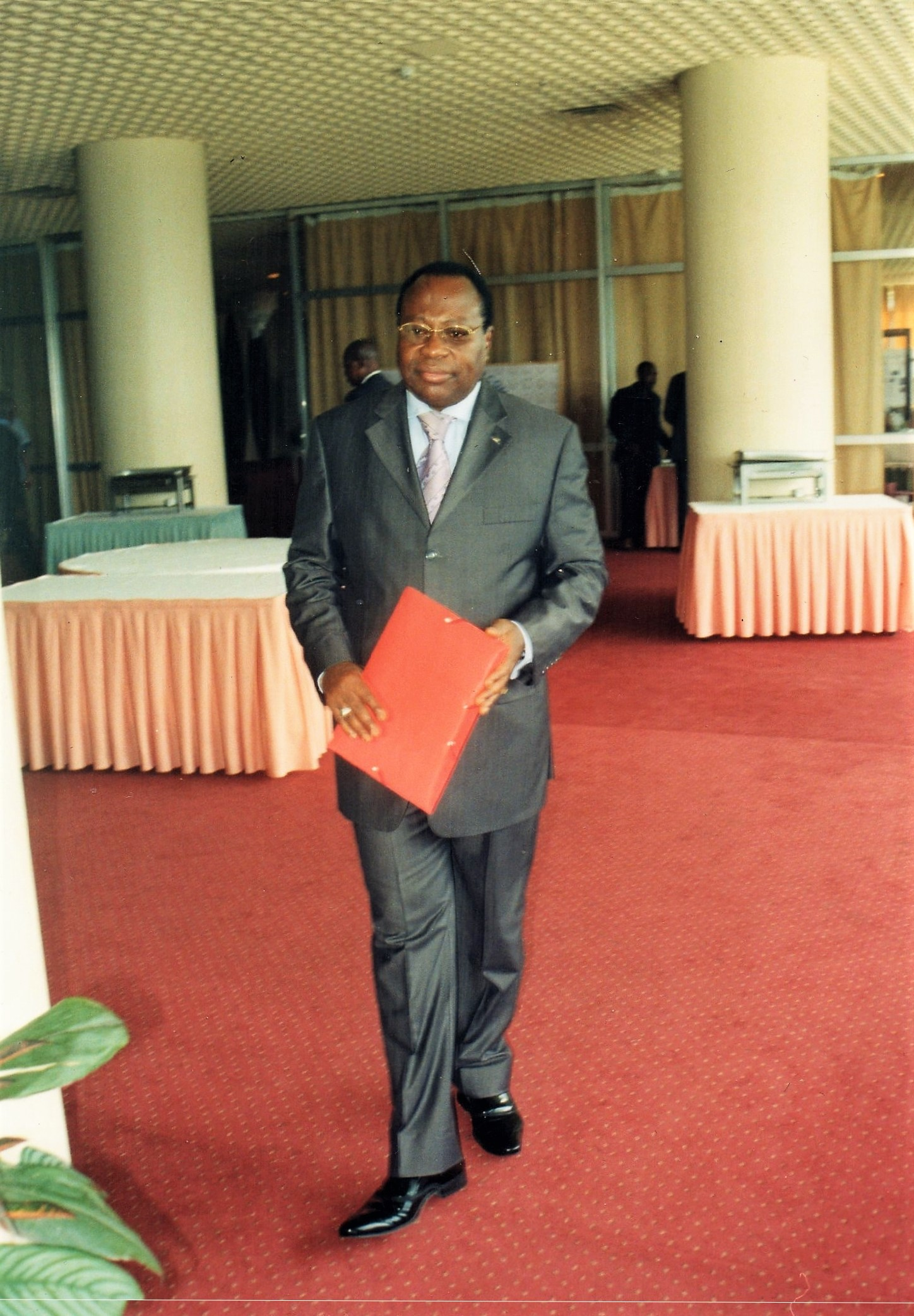

Dr Bernard Zoba, of the Republic of the Congo (Congo-Brazzaville), is Commissioner of Infrastructure and Energy for the African Union's African Commission. Zoba was a signatory on behalf of the African Commission to an agreement between the Commission and France, in which the latter donated €5 million for the advancement of African Union activities.
