= Amira El Fadil =

Sudanese government official

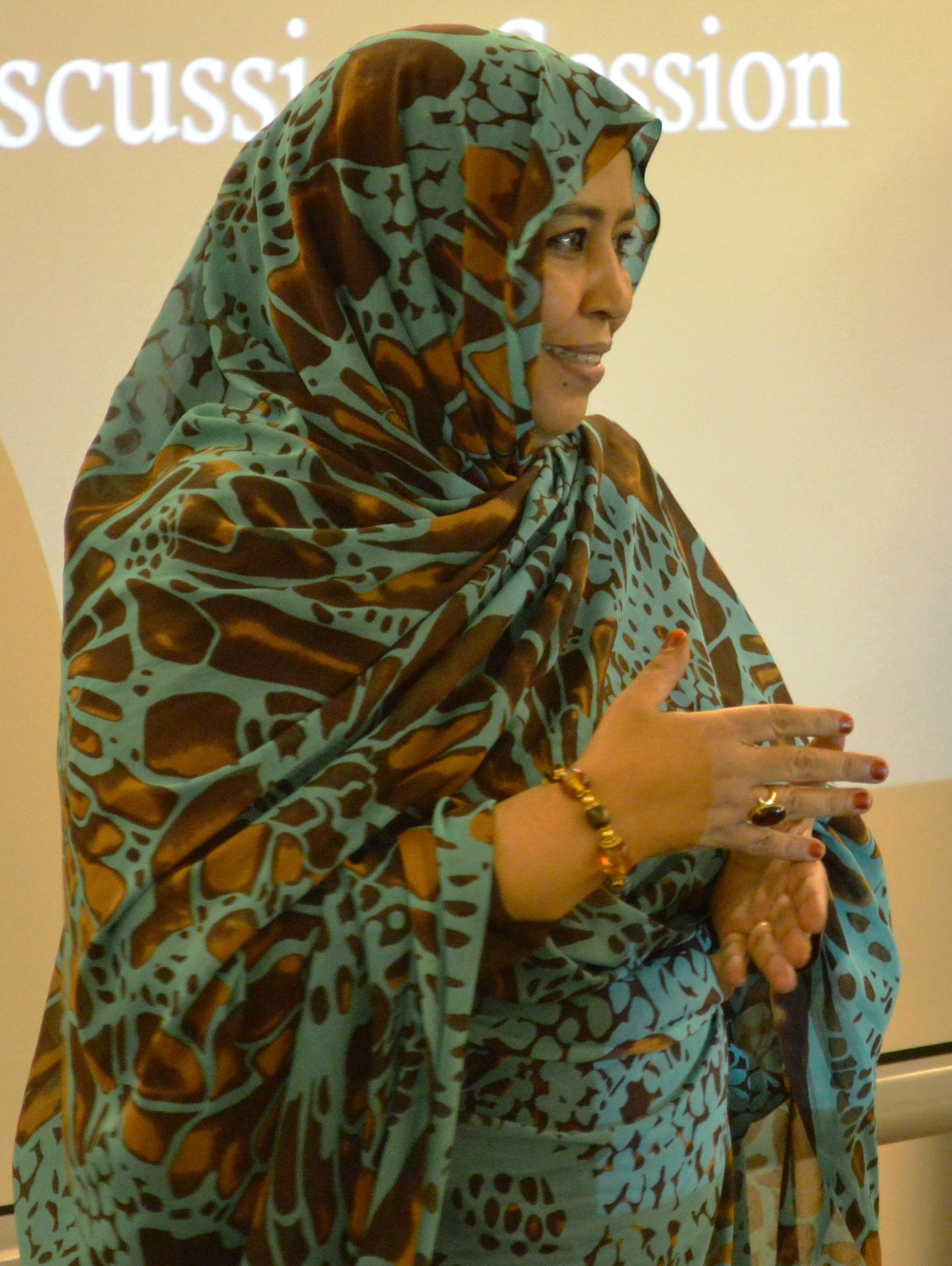

Commissioner for Social Affairs African Union Commission 2016
- Minister: Minister of Social Welfare and Social Insurance

Personal details
- Born: 15 January 1967 (age 59)
- Citizenship: Sudan

Amira El Fadil (born 15 January 1967) is a Sudanese government official.

She previously held the position of Minister of Social Welfare and Social Insurance for the Government of Sudan. In 2016, she was elected to a four-year term as Commissioner for Social Affairs of the African Union Commission. She is also a member of the executive board of the World Anti-Doping Agency.

El Fadil has worked with the Association of Women for Rural Development and Immigration, Women, Children and Family. She has participated in the Women's Rally for Peace and led workshops on peacebuilding and conflict resolution.
