= Tiéfing Konaté =

Malian politician and soldier

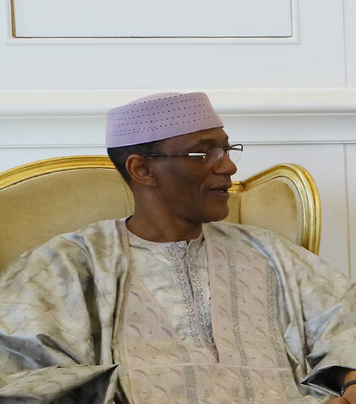

Minister of Internal Security and Civilian Protection
- In office 24 April 2012 – September 2013
- Preceded by: Sadio Gassama
- Succeeded by: Sada Samaké

Personal details
- Born: 30 September 1954 (age 71) Bamako, French Sudan (now Mali)

General Tiéfing Konaté (born 1954) is a Malian politician, diplomat and soldier. He served as the Minister of Internal Security and Civilian Protection of Mali from April 2012 until September 2013. He is a graduate of the Joint Military Academy in Kati. Between 1993 and 1994, he was in charge of the Presidency of the Republic and then Chief of Staff of the National Gendarmerie between 1994 and 2000. He then served as technical adviser to the Ministry of Internal Security and Protection Civilian between 2000 and 2008, before being appointed director of the National Gendarmerie, a position he held between 2008 and 2011.

He served as the Ambassador of Mali to Russia since in 2016, with dual accreditation to Mongolia.
