= Amadou Konare =

Malian rebel and military leader

- Born: Mali
- Military career
- Allegiance: National Committee for the Restoration of Democracy and State
- Rank: Lieutenant
- Conflicts: 2012 Malian coup d'état

Lieutenant Amadou Konare is one of the leaders and spokesperson of the National Committee for the Restoration of Democracy and State which forced out President Amadou Toumani Touré after the 2012 Malian coup d'état.
