= Amani Asfour =

Egyptian politician

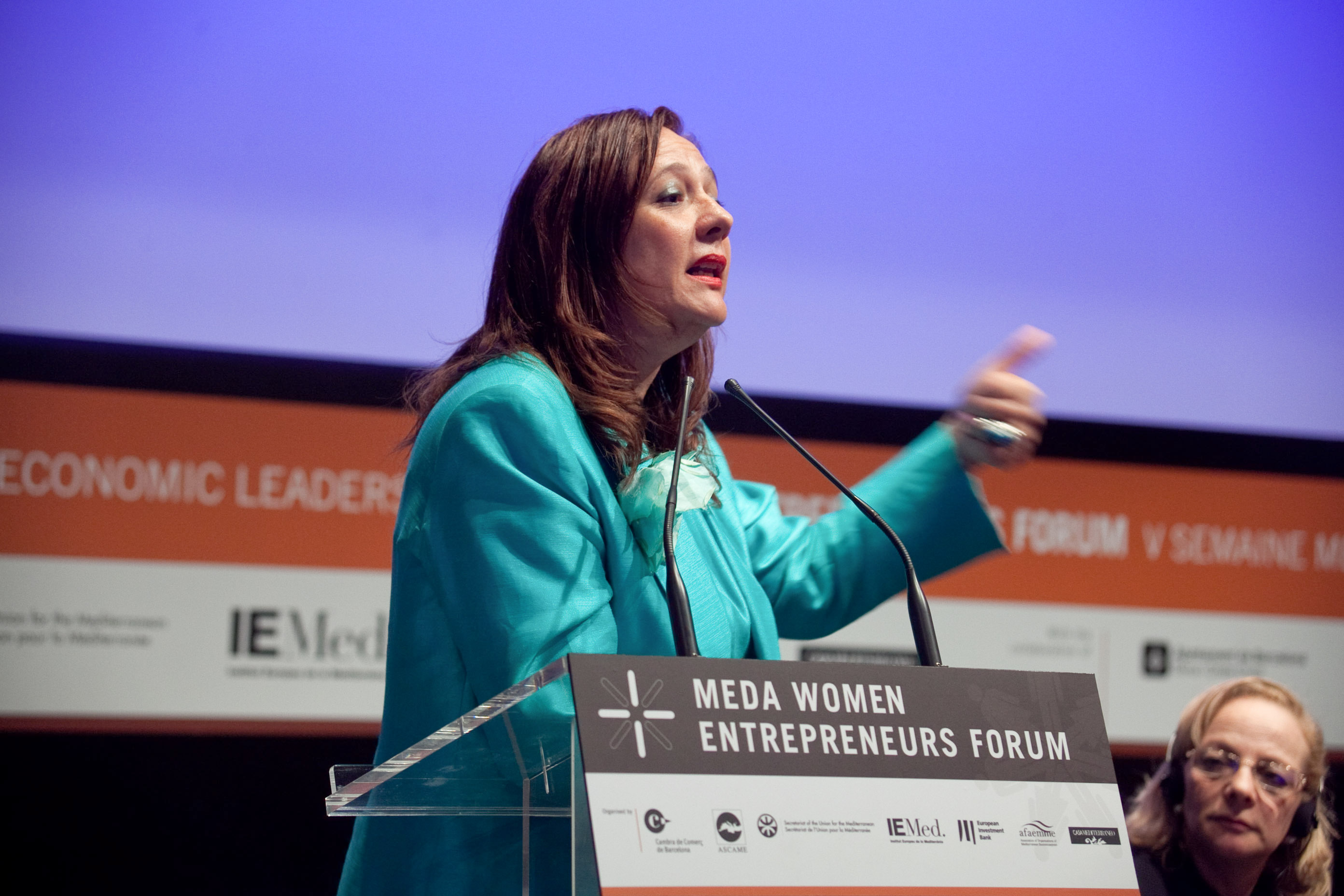
Amany Asfour in Barcelona in November 2011.

Amany Asfour is a businessperson from Egypt.

== Career ==
She holds the titles of:

- President, International Federation of Business & Professional Women
- President, Egyptian Business Women Association (EBWA)
- President, Organization of Women in Trade OWIT - Cairo Chapter
- President, African Alliance for Women Empowerment
- President, Afro-Arab Network for Women Empowerment
- Chairwoman, FEMCOM Federation of Business Women Associations of Common Market for Eastern & Southern Africa (COMESA).
- Vice Chairwoman, COMESA Business Council
- Founder, Hatshepsut Women Business Development Center and Business Incubator for Entrepreneurs
- Chairwoman, Human Resources, Science & Technology Cluster of the AU- ECOSOCC
- President, Mediterranean Congress for Business and Professional Women
- Secretary General, African Society for Scientific Research & Technology

== Early life ==
Asfour graduated from Faculty of Medicine - Cairo University and has her master's degree and M.D. in pediatrics. She is a lecturer of pediatrics at the National Research Center of Egypt. She joined the private sector when she was a student. Within a few years, she was also able to establish a company for medical equipment, selling more than 30 different brands.

== Other interests ==
Asfour's interests were not limited to establishing her private business. She realized the importance of creating an organization targeting economic empowerment for women and the promotion of entrepreneurship. She established the Egyptian Businesswomens' Association in 1995 with the objectives of promoting young generations of women entrepreneurs and giving guidance to women business owners of small and medium-size enterprises. Her organization also supports mainstream women in the global market. She directed her efforts toward economic empowerment for women, capacity building, development of human resources, and equal opportunity for girls and women in education, training, and promotion of women and youth in science and technology.

== Worldwide contributions ==
Asfour is active in the African, Arab, and Mediterranean. She founded an association for business and professional women in Egypt and then established The African Alliance for Women Empowerment. The latter focuses on the whole of Africa, targeting female empowerment and promoting economic integration among women and youth entrepreneurs in Africa. Asfour also initiated the Mediterranean Congress for Business and Professional Women as a platform for sharing experiences and good practices among women entrepreneurs in the Mediterranean region.

Asfour has received many awards from Egypt, Africa, the Arab world, and the Islamic world. She has established many partnerships with international and regional organizations, including UN Women, UNDP, ILO, UNIDO, the African Union, the European Union, the Common Market for Eastern and Southern Africa (COMESA), and different Mediterranean chambers of commerce. She was also successful in implementing 2 large projects for establishing the Hatshepsut Business Women Development Center and a regional program for the support of female entrepreneurs in Egypt, Sudan, and Ethiopia.
