= Fatima Zohra Karadja =

- Born: April 20, 1949 (age 76); Algiers, Algeria
- Occupation: Child therapist

Fatima Zohra Karadja (born 1949) is a Vice-President for the African Union's Economic, Social and Cultural Council for Northern Africa.

Ms Karadja was born on April 20, 1949, in Algiers, Algeria. She is a child therapist, holding a PhD in psychology and specialising in working with children affected by trauma. As a member of the African Women Committee for Peace and Development (AWCPD), she has actively engaged civil society organisations in Algeria.

She established a national network of local NGOs for sensitisation and the dissemination of information on sustainable development and peace building, and a coordinating body, comprising six organisations and six prominent Algerian women, to promote the different mandates of the AWCPD. She is also in constant communication with her President for his support of AWCPD objectives and activities.

Ms Karadja is the President of the Association Nationale de Soutien aux Enfants en Difficulté en Institution (ANSEDI). ANSEDI has created a psychological and social care unit which provides basic necessities and psychological treatment to victims of violence. The unit focuses on women, especially single mothers, by working to prepare them for their parental role. ANSEDI also facilitates training sessions for women from opposing factions to come together for sensitisation and dialogue on human rights. In collaboration with other organisations, ANSEDI is formulating a strategy to fight against social exclusion by involving at-risk populations in community activities.

Since 1974, Ms Karadja has directed a welcome centre for children separated from their families. The centre provides children with a home until they can be reunited with their families or, where that is not possible, until they are adopted into a family. Based on the same principle, the centre acts a mediator in family disputes and provides support to single mothers that are faced with rejection and stigmatisation from their communities.

At a regional level, Ms Karadja contributed to the creation of a network of North African organisations, representing six African countries. The main purpose of the network is to create a common platform for early-warning mechanisms and conflict resolution. In 2001, during the Paris-Dakar rally, the Government of Morocco decided to organise the rally through the Western Sahara, creating severe tension with the self-proclaimed territory. The network of North African women immediately responded, and coordinated sensitisation meetings with the women of Western Sahara to encourage them to settle the dispute in a peaceful manner. In this way, the network effectively contributed to the prevention of conflict in the region.

At an international level, Ms Karadja has participated in numerous conferences, including the 1999 AU General Assembly, the Forum for African Women in Algeria, the 2001 and 2002 Civil Society and AU conferences in Addis Ababa, and the World Conference on Peace and Solidarity in 2002. She is also an observer member of the African Commission on Human and Peoples' Rights, and a member of the Health Promoters NGO.

Besides her work in the NGO sector, Ms Karadja is heavily involved in academic and scholarly work. She is a professor of psychology and an international consultant on psychology for conflict resolution. In addition she contributes to social science research and monitors different studies on emerging problems in the psychology of conflict.
