= Cross-Cutting Programs Committee =

African Union committee

The Cross-Cutting Programs Committee is a committee of the African Union's Economic, Social and Cultural Council. Its responsibilities include HIV/AIDS, international cooperation, and coordination within the African Union.
