= Josefa Sacko =

Angolan agronomist, economist, and diplomat

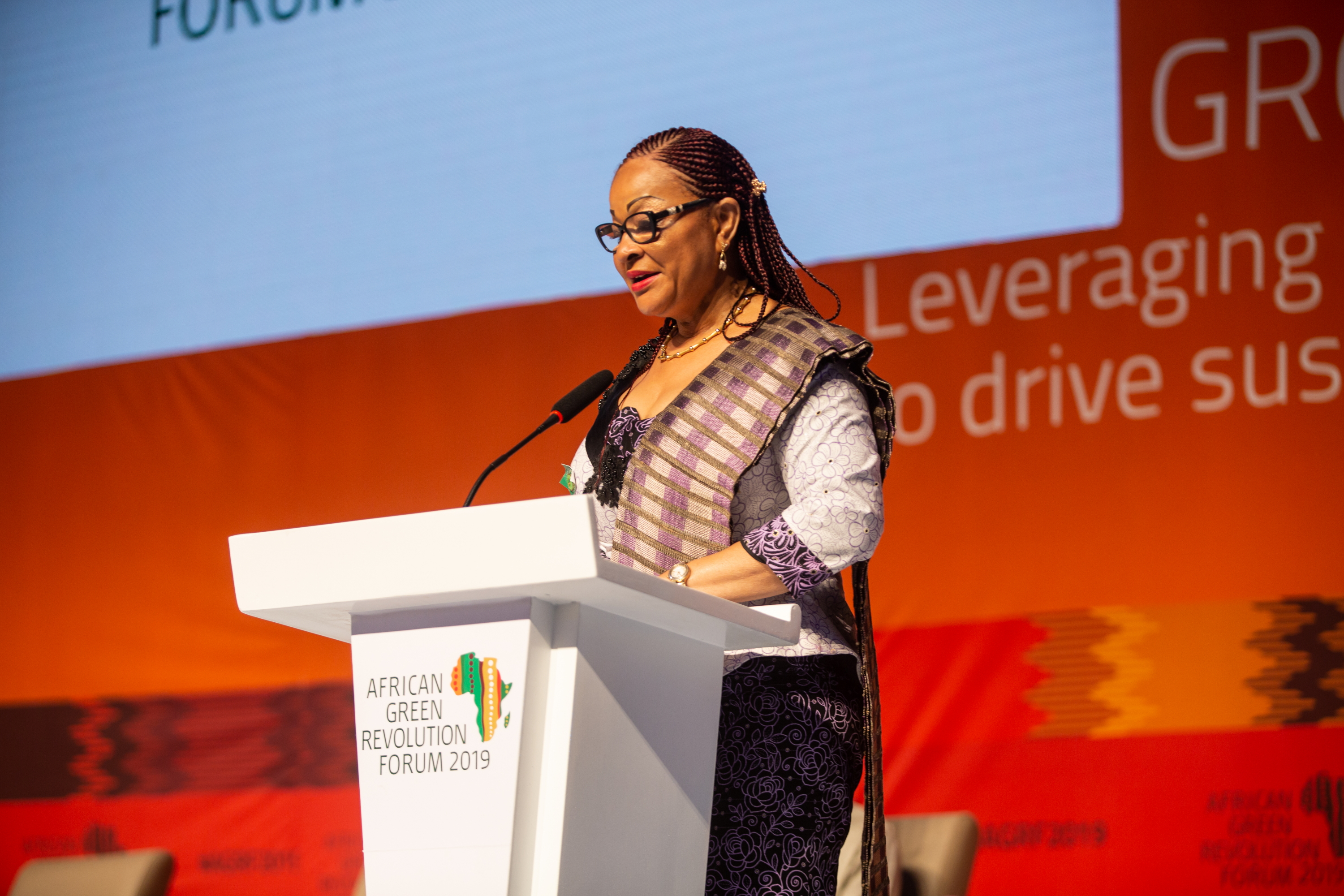
- Sacko in 2019

African Union Commissioner for Agriculture, Rural Development, Blue Economy and Sustainable Environment
- Incumbent
- Assumed office January 2017
- President: Moussa Faki
- Preceded by: Rhoda Peace Tumusiime

Secretary-General of the Inter-African Coffee Organization
- In office 2004–2017

Special Advisor to the Angolan Government
- In office 2000–2004
- President: José Eduardo dos Santos

Personal details
- Occupation: Agronomist, economist, diplomat
- Awards: Crans Montana Forum Recognition Award (2019)

Josefa Leonel Correia Sacko is an Angolan agronomist, economist and diplomat. She currently serves as the Commissioner for Agriculture, Rural Development, Blue Economy and Sustainable Environment of the African Union Commission. Prior to her current role, she was a Special Advisor to the Angolan Government, namely to the Angolan Minister of Environment and the Angolan Minister of Agriculture, focusing on international cooperation. She previously served as the Secretary-General of the Inter-African Coffee Organization (IACO) for 13 years.

== Career ==
Sacko has made significant contributions to agriculture and international diplomacy. She began her career as a special adviser to the Minister of Agriculture in Angola, overseeing food security, poverty reduction, and nutrition. She later served as the Secretary-General of the Inter-African Coffee Organization (IACO), where she managed the economic interests of 25 African coffee-producing countries. During her tenure, she established Regional Centers of Excellence to enhance the capacity of member states in genetic material conservation and coffee quality improvement across several African countries including Cote d’Ivoire, Uganda, Cameroon, and Zambia.

Sacko has received several awards and recognitions for her contributions, including being named one of the 100 most influential people in climate policy in March 2019 and receiving the Prix de la Foundation 2019 at the Crans Montana African Women’s Forum for her efforts in empowering rural women. Sacko is fluent in Portuguese, French, English, Spanish, and Lingala.

== Honors and awards ==
- Crans Montana Forum Recognition Award (2019)
