= Moses Tito Kachima =

Moses Tito Kachima is a member of the African Union's Economic, Social and Cultural Council, representing Southern Africa.
