= Helder Francisco Malauene =

Mozambican politician

Helder Francisco Malauene is a Mozambican politician. He served as a member of the Economic, Social and Cultural Council of the African Union and as Chairman of the Social Affairs and Health Committee.
