= Julienne Mavoungou Makaya =

Congolese politician

Julienne Mavoungou Makaya is a politician from the Republic of the Congo. She is a member of the African Union's Economic, Social and Cultural Council representing Central Africa.
