= African Union Department of Education, Science, Technology and Innovation =

Department of the African Union

- Abbreviation: ESTI
- Type: Department
- Headquarters: Addis Ababa, Ethiopia
- Parent organization: African Union
- Website: au.int/en/esti

The Department of Education, Science, Technology and Innovation (ESTI) is a department of the African Union responsible for coordinating AU programmes on human resource development, education, science, technology, and promoting the youth development agenda.

== Key roles ==
ESTI's core roles include:

- Promoting research and publication on science and technology;
- Promoting cooperation among member states on education and training;
- Encouraging youth participation in the integration of the continent;
- Implementing the Agenda 2063 initiatives for the African Virtual and E-University and the Africa Outer Space Strategy;
- Implementing continental educational policies and strategies, including the Continental Education Strategy for Africa (CESA), the Science, Technology and Innovation Strategy for Africa (STISA), the TVET Continental Strategy, and the AU School Feeding initiative.

== Technical offices ==
The department coordinates the activities of the following technical offices:

- Scientific, Technical and Research Commission (STRC)
- African Observatory of Science, Technology and Innovation (AOSTI)
- Pan African University (PAU)
- Pan African Institute for Education for Development (IPED)/African Observatory for Education

== Scholarships and awards ==
ESTI promotes AU initiatives in education and STI development and coordinates the AU’s education and scientific scholarships and awards, including:

- Nyerere Scholarship and Academic Mobility Programme
- Kwame Nkrumah Scientific Awards

== See also ==
- African Union
- Agenda 2063
