= Zeinab Kamel Ali =

Djiboutian politician

Mrs. Zeinab Kamel Ali is a Djiboutian politician and a member of the standing committee for the African Union's Economic, Social and Cultural Council representing Eastern Africa.
