= Modibo Sidibé =

Malian politician

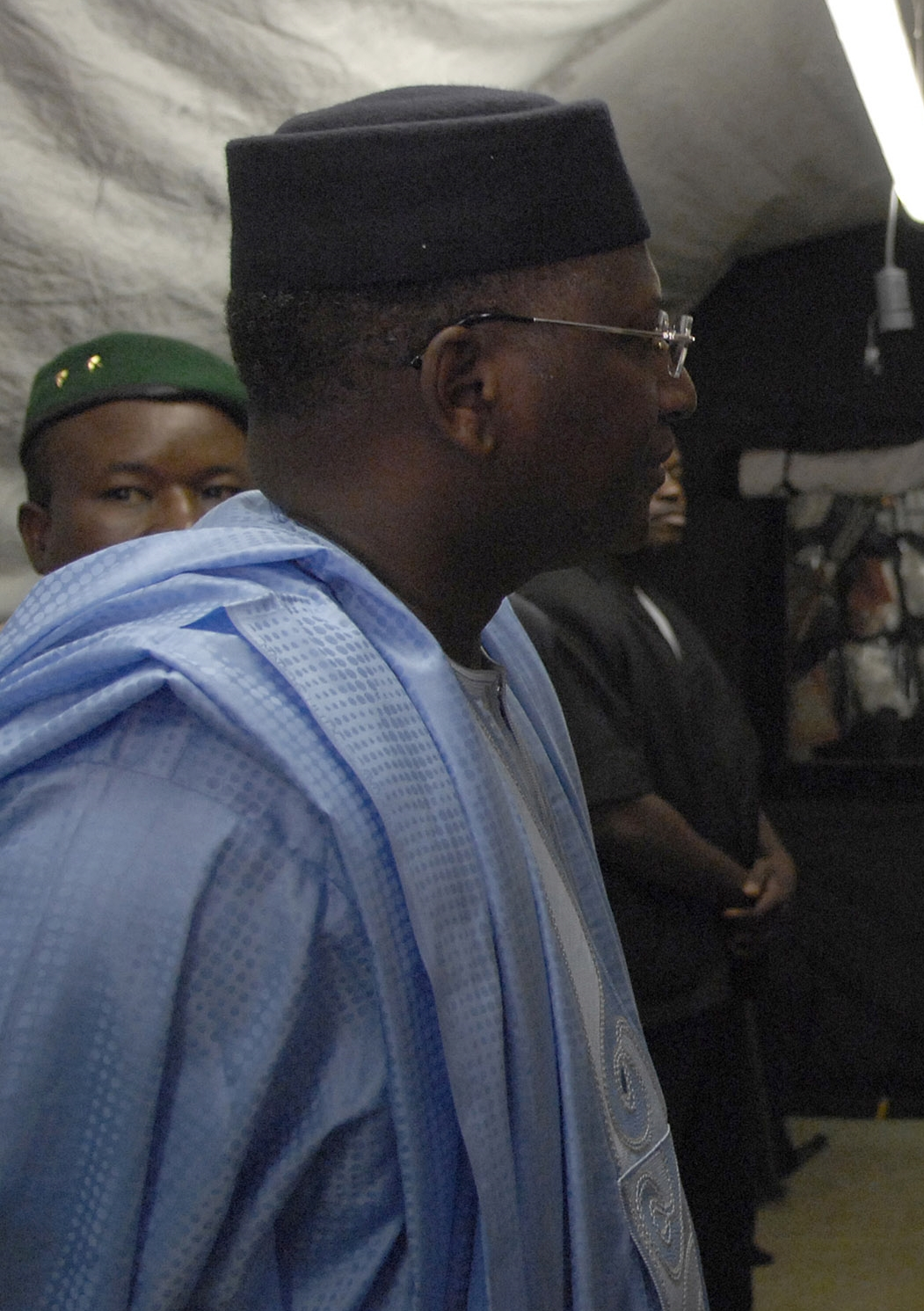

11th Prime Minister of Mali
- In office 28 September 2007 – 3 April 2011
- President: Amadou Toumani Touré
- Preceded by: Ousmane Issoufi Maïga
- Succeeded by: Cissé Mariam Kaïdama Sidibé

Minister for Foreign Affairs
- In office 16 September 1997 – 9 June 2002
- Prime Minister: Ibrahim Boubacar Keïta; Mandé Sidibé; Modibo Keita
- Preceded by: Dioncounda Traoré
- Succeeded by: Lassana Traoré

Personal details
- Born: 7 November 1952 (age 73) Bamako, French Sudan (now Mali)
- Party: FARE AN KA WULI

Modibo Sidibé (born 7 November 1952) is a Malian politician who was Prime Minister of Mali from September 2007 to April 2011.

== Career ==
Sidibé, who was born in Bamako, was a police chief before serving as a technical adviser to the Ministry delegated to National Defense from 1986 to 1989; he was then the chief of staff (chef de cabinet) of the same ministry from 1989 to 1991. He was briefly the Director of the Cabinet of the Minister Delegate for Internal Security in 1991, then Director of the Cabinet of transitional military leader Amadou Toumani Touré from 1991 to 1992; in the latter position, he held the rank of Minister.

He held the rank of Inspector-General of Police.

=== As Prime Minister ===
Under President Alpha Oumar Konaré, Sidibé was named Minister for Health, Solidarity and the Elderly in April 1993. He remained in this position until he was appointed Minister of Foreign Affairs and Cooperation on 16 September 1997. After nearly five years as foreign minister, he was named secretary-general of the presidency (with the rank of minister) by Amadou Toumani Touré on 9 June 2002, following Touré's election as president. He served as Secretary-General of the Presidency until he was appointed prime minister by Touré on 28 September 2007. His government was named on 3 October.

Sidibé resigned on 30 March 2011. His replacement was Cissé Mariam Kaïdama Sidibé, who was appointed Mali's first female prime minister late on 3 April 2011. Sidibé was expected to stand as a candidate in the April 2012 presidential election, but in the months that followed he said nothing to confirm the speculation. He met with President Touré on 6 September 2011 to tell Touré that he was resigning from his rank as Inspector-General of Police; given that it was legally necessary for him to resign that rank at least six months before the election in order to stand as a presidential candidate, the move was viewed as an indication of his plans.

== Family ==
He is the brother of economist Mandé Sidibé, who was also Prime Minister for a time.

Political offices
| Preceded by Dioncounda Traoré | Minister of Foreign Affairs; 1997–2002 | Succeeded by Lassana Traoré |
| Preceded by Ousmane Issoufi Maïga | Prime Minister of Mali; 2007–2011 | Succeeded by Cissé Mariam Kaïdama Sidibé |
