= Jean Collins Musonda Kalusambo =

Democratic Republic of the Congo politician

Jean Collins Musonda Kalusambo is a member of the African Union's Economic, Social and Cultural Council representing Central Africa.
