= Bankole Adeoye =

African diplomat from Nigeria

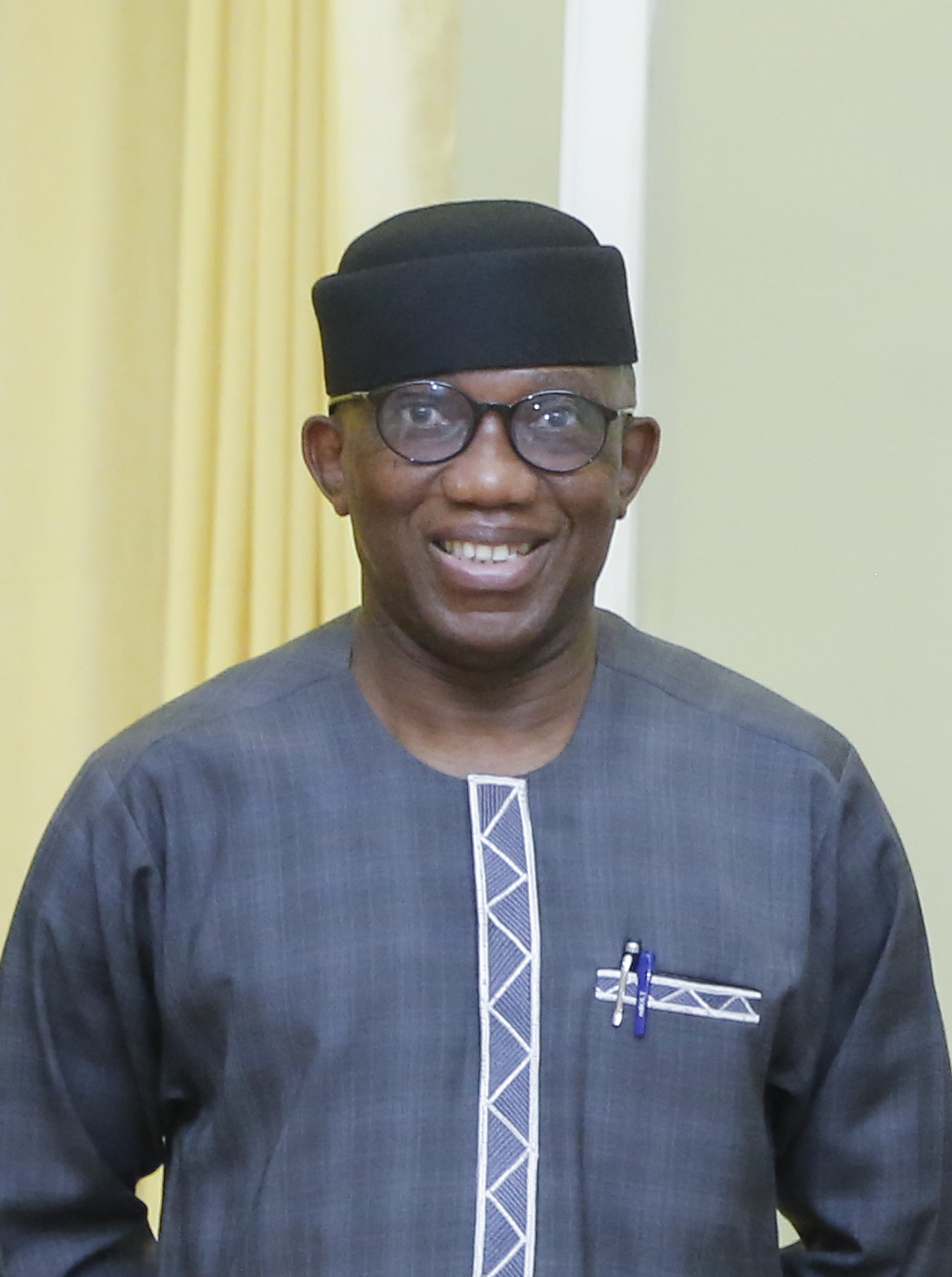

African Union Commissioner for Political Affairs, Peace, and Security
- Incumbent
- Assumed office March 2021

Personal details
- Born: September 9, 1959 (age 66)
- Education: Obafemi Awolowo University (1982); University of Lagos (1987); University of Oxford (1991)
- Occupation: Diplomat
- Awards: Commonwealth Chevening Scholar

Bankole Adeoye (born 9 September 1959) is an African diplomat from Nigeria. He currently serves as the African Union (AU) Commissioner for Political Affairs, Peace, and Security.

== Early life & education ==
Adeoye earned his B.A. in Political Science & History at Ifẹ in 1982 and a Msc in Political Science at Lagos in 1987. He also obtained a Phd at Oxford University in 1991.

== Career ==
Adeoye has served as Nigeria’s Permanent Representative to the AU and UNECA and Ambassador to Ethiopia and Djibouti, Chief of Staff for the African Union Development Agency (AUDA- NEPAD) and also the Director in the International Organizations Department of the Ministry of Foreign Affairs.
