= Cissé Mariam Kaïdama Sidibé =

Prime Minister of Mali (1948–2021)

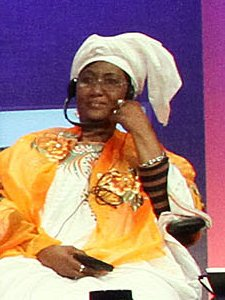

12th Prime Minister of Mali
- In office 3 April 2011 – 22 March 2012
- President: Amadou Toumani Touré
- Preceded by: Modibo Sidibé
- Succeeded by: Cheick Modibo Diarra (Acting)

Personal details
- Born: 4 January 1948 Timbuktu, French Sudan (now Mali)
- Died: 6 November 2021 (aged 73) Tunis, Tunisia
- Party: Independent
- Education: National School of Administration, Bamako

Cissé Mariam Kaïdama Sidibé (4 January 1948 – 6 November 2021) was a Malian politician and the Prime Minister of Mali at the time of the 2012 Malian coup d'état. She was the first female prime minister in the country's history. She was announced to the position by decree on 3 April 2011, replacing Modibo Sidibé. She held the position for slightly less than a year under the presidency of Amadou Toumani Touré before she was removed from office in the 22 March 2012 coup.

== Early career ==
Mariam Kaïdama Sidibé was born in Timbuktu, Mali on 4 January 1948. Her family name is Sidibé but she later took her husband's family name Cissé as well. Sidibé Cissé was educated at a Goundam primary school, and later received her baccalauréat in 1970. From there she received a degree in Civil Administration from the Malian National School for Administration (EDA) in Bamako.

From 1974 to 1989 Sidibé Cissé worked as a civil servant in the Ministry of Oversight for State Companies and Societies (Ministère de Tutelle des Sociétés et Entreprises d’Etat du Mali), becoming assistant to the Minister from 1987. During this period, Sidibé Cissé studied at universities and foundations throughout West Africa, and farther afield in France, Canada, Belgium, and Italy.

In the interim return to democratic rule in 1991, Sidibé Cissé was named special adviser to the president (the interim presidency then held by coup leader Amadou Toumani Touré) and was named Minister of Planning and International Cooperation of the transitional government (August 1991-June 1992). From May 1992 to June 1992, she also was Minister of Agriculture. Sidibé Cissé served from August 1993 to November 2000 as executive secretary of the intergovernmental Interstate Committee on the Fight Against Desertification in the Sahel ( Cilss -- Comité Inter-Etats de lutte contre la sécheresse au Sahel) based in Ouagadougou. In August 2001 Sidibé Cissé was again named special counselor to the president, this time following Amadou Toumani Touré election to that office. From March to June 2002, Sidibé Cissé was again appointed to ministerial posting, becoming Minister of Rural Development. In 2003, Sidibé Cissé was named the president of the administrative council of Mali's government Tobacco corporation, SONTAM (Société nationale des tabacs et allumettes du Mali).

== Prime minister ==
On 30 March 2011 Amadou Toumani Touré announced that his prime minister, Modibo Sidibé, was stepping down and dissolving the government. Sidibé Cissé's appointment as PM was read out as "Decree No. 2011-173 PRM" on state television during the morning of 3 April. She was the first female prime minister of Mali, and the second prime minister of President Amadou Toumani Touré's second and final term.

Sidibé Cissé and the current president were said by his press office to be "old friends", though her direct involvement in politics over the last decade has been minimal.

Malian press reactions to her appointment centered on her role as the first female PM, but also on the political calculus behind the move. One paper described her as "unknown to most of the public". Others pointed to the promise made that the government would not contain any leaders wishing to run in the 2012 Presidential or legislative elections. President Amadou Toumani Touré, who is not a member of any political party, has ruled over a multiparty coalition of ADEMA-PASJ, which had recently come under internal stress due to rumors that the former PM was preparing for a 2012 presidential bid. The new PM is seen as having been close to the previous president (and ADEMA leader) Alpha Oumar Konare, and perhaps a "clean pair of hands" to carry out government reforms which President Amadou Toumani Touré has promised.

The editor of the powerful Bamako daily, Le Républicain, speculated that Amadou Toumani Touré's choice of woman prime minister was in part a symbol, reaching out to female voters in the year leading to the June 2012 Malian elections, and allowing the previous PM opportunity to run for the presidency. He praised the president for his appointment in a "still very conservative country remains divided on the issue of gender and the vicissitudes of the family code", a reference to the Family Law bill proposed in 2009, that would have promoted women's rights, and was withdrawn after large conservative protests.

== Removal from office ==
On 22 March 2012, mutinying soldiers unhappy with Touré's management of the 2012 Tuareg rebellion seized power in a coup d'état. Amnesty International reported that Sidibé Cissé and other ministers had been detained by junta forces and were being held at a military camp in Kati.

== International and diplomatic roles ==
On 26 May 2011, Cissé Mariam Kaïdama Sidibé was one of the keynote speakers at the launch of UNESCO's Global Partnership for Girls' and Women's Education. As prime minister, she received state visits, including the visit from HSH Prince Albert II of Monaco in February 2012. On 5 November 2015 she was named ambassador of the Niger Basin Authority (NBA) to the COP21 held in Paris.

== Personal life ==
Sidibé Cissé was married and the mother of four children. She died on 6 November 2021, aged 73.

Political offices
Preceded by Modibo Sidibé	Prime Minister of Mali; 2011–2012	Succeeded by Cheick Modibo Diarra; Acting
