= 2012 Malian coup d'état =

Coup d'état against the Tuareg rebellion of 2012

- Part of the Mali War of the Sahel War
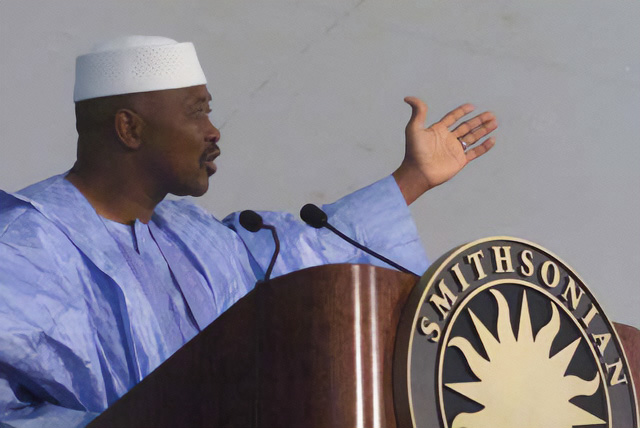
- Malian President Amadou Toumani Touré was ousted during the March 2012 coup d'état
| Date | 21 March 2012 – 8 April 2012 |
| Location | Mali 12°39′N 8°0′W |
| Result | Coup d'état successful: Renegade soldiers seize presidential palace, state media and other buildings, forcing President Touré into hiding; Renegade soldiers claim successful coup, declare nationwide curfew and suspend the constitution; Tuareg insurgency takes control of Northern Mali and declares independent nation of Azawad; December 2012 ouster of Prime Minister Cheick Modibo Diarra and his government |

Belligerents
| Government of Mali: 33rd Parachute Regiment; Presidential Guard | (Mali) National Committee for the Restoration of Democracy and State (CNRDR) |

Commanders and leaders
| Amadou Toumani Touré (President of Mali) Sadio Gassama (Brigadier General and Defense minister of Mali) | (Mali) Amadou Sanogo (Captain and the leader of the CNRDR) (Mali) Amadou Konare (Lieutenant and a spokesman for the CNRDR) |

Strength
| Unknown | Unknown |

Casualties and losses
| 34 killed 28 wounded | 1 killed 2 wounded |
- 40 unspecified people wounded

The 2012 Malian coup d'état began on 21 March that year, when mutinying Malian soldiers, displeased with the management of the Tuareg rebellion, attacked several locations in the capital Bamako, including the presidential palace, state television, and military barracks. The soldiers, who said they had formed the National Committee for the Restoration of Democracy and State, declared the following day that they had overthrown the government of Amadou Toumani Touré, forcing him into hiding. The coup was followed by "unanimous" international condemnation, harsh sanctions by Mali's neighbors, and the swift loss of northern Mali to Tuareg forces, leading Reuters to describe the coup as "a spectacular own-goal". On 6 April, the junta agreed with Economic Community of West African States (ECOWAS) negotiators that they would step down from power in return for the end of sanctions, giving power to a transitional government led by parliament speaker Dioncounda Traoré. In the following days, both Touré and coup leader Amadou Sanogo formally resigned; however, as of 16 May, the junta was still "widely thought to have maintained overall control". On 3 December 2013, a mass grave was discovered in Diago holding the remains of 21 soldiers that had gone missing the year before, loyal to the ousted president.

== Background ==
Tuareg rebels launched a major offensive against Mali's security forces and military in a bid to seize the northern town of Kidal on 6 February 2012. Some loyalist Tuareg fled to the city of Bamako, fearing reprisals after violent demonstrations in the first week of February. The Tuareg rebels had been bolstered by an influx of battle-hardened, well-armed fighters returning from the Libyan Civil War, to which they had traveled to fight for Muammar Gaddafi, the Libyan leader who was deposed and killed. On 8 February, the National Movement for the Liberation of Azawad (MNLA) seized the Mali-Algeria border town of Tinzaouaten as Malian soldiers crossed into Algeria. Islamist militant group Ansar Dine demanded the imposition of Islamic law in northern Mali, while the secular Tuareg nationalist Azawad National Liberation Movement (MNLA) have stated they want an autonomous, if not completely independent, homeland.

The coup attempt followed weeks of protests of the government's handling of a nomad-led rebellion in the country's north, which had dropped Touré's popularity to "a new low". Soldiers demanded more weapons and resources for their campaign against the rebels, and were dissatisfied with a lack of government support for the army, some soldiers having been sent to the front without sufficient food. Touré was to leave office when his term expired after the presidential election in April.

Factors that led to the coup:

- Bamako always had difficulty controlling the north of the country, a territory that had been disputed by the MNLA and its precursor groups since the 1960s.
- Mali was going through a security crisis as AQIM members flooded in from Algeria and other neighboring countries.
- Mali was going through a harsh food crisis that led to displaced populations, refugee camps, and starving women and children.

== Timeline ==
=== Early events ===
==== 21 March ====
On 21 March, defence minister Brigadier General Sadio Gassama went to the Kati military camp, 15 kilometres (9.3 mi) north of Bamako, to defuse a protest planned for the next day by soldiers of the camp against perceived bad management of the conflict with the Tuareg rebellion in the north of Mali. He was met with boos and stones were thrown at his car. He was sequestered, and his guards fired warning shots in the air. The minister was released thanks to the intervention of the Kati zone commander ("commandant de zone"). The soldiers then stormed the weapons and ammunition reserves of the camp. Two soldiers were injured, but the presidency said Gassama was neither injured nor arrested.

Later that day, armored vehicles sealed off the presidential palace, and reporters heard 10 minutes of automatic gunfire near the headquarters of the Malian state broadcaster, whose programmes went off the air. Soldiers blocked the path to the buildings. The Associated Press spoke with a soldier who said that when soldiers entered the palace, Touré's bodyguards did not defend the building. The mutinying soldiers searched the area for Touré, but he was not caught.

In the evening, after several hours, Mali's state broadcaster ORTM came back on the air with a brief message displayed against a backdrop of traditional Malian music and dance. "In a moment, there will be a statement by the military", the message read. A riot broke out at a military garrison near the northern town of Gao, and a military student reportedly said recruits had shot into the air and took several of their senior commanding officers hostage.

==== 22 March ====
Angry soldiers took over the capital city, Bamako. In the morning, Amadou Konare went on state television which identified him as the spokesperson of the National Committee for the Restoration of Democracy and State (CNRDR), formed by the renegade soldiers. Konare declared that the soldiers had seized power from 'the incompetent regime of Amadou Toumani Touré' and said it would look to hand over power to a new, democratically elected government.

Later, Captain Amadou Sanogo, identified as CNRDR's president, also went on state television to declare a dusk-to-dawn curfew "until further notice". He urged calm and condemned any pillaging. Soldiers were unable to find Touré. In the morning, Kenya's foreign minister, who was visiting Mali at the time, reported that Bamako airport had been closed and that he could hear gunfire. Sanogo also declared the land and air borders of Mali closed until further notice.

A military official loyal to the President said the President was in good health, and that the Interior and the Defense Ministers were also safe – contrary to earlier reports that the defense minister had been arrested. Foreign Minister Soumeylou Boubeye Maiga was among several ministers arrested after rebels seized the Presidential palace and other parts of the capital. Amnesty International reported that Prime Minister Cissé Mariam Kaïdama Sidibé had been arrested, and that the detained ministers were being held at the military camp in Kati.

Later in the day it was revealed the president had sought refuge at an undisclosed army base with loyal soldiers. The BBC reported that the Malian Army's elite force, the Red Berets, was still loyal to Touré. Loyalists confirmed that Touré was "safe and in command" at a military camp somewhere in Bamako, under protection from his "Red Berets", a parachute regiment which he formerly served in.

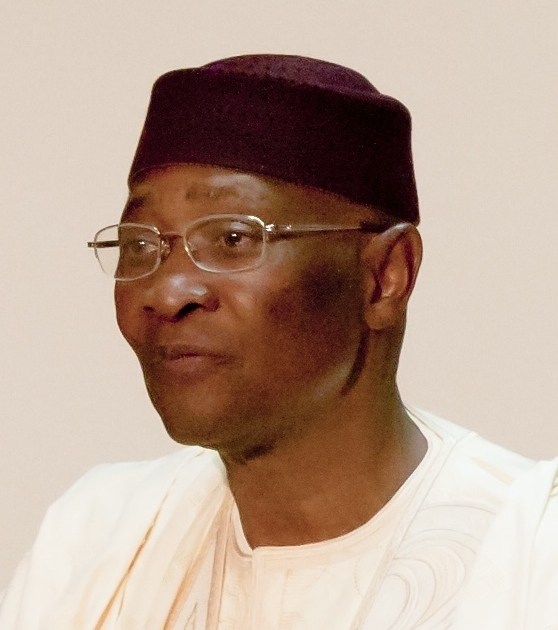
Amadou Toumani Touré

Rebel soldiers said during the evening they intended to launch an assault on the loyalist army camp in the capital.

As the day progressed, the rebel soldiers looted the Presidential Palace, taking TVs and other goods, while their leader urged them to stop the celebratory gunfire, which had been responsible for at least 20 injuries in the capital.

===== Tuareg advance =====
Inspired in part by the diversion caused by the military coup, Tuareg rebels in the country's north launched incursions deeper into Mali, seizing towns and bases formerly held by government forces fighting the conflict that caused the coup. As military forces were engaged in consolidating their hold on the capital, the rebels were able to push southward with little opposition. According to the MNLA, Malian army forces retreated to Gao.

==== 23 March ====
The African Union suspended Mali, until "effective restoration of constitutional order is achieved without delay".

Several African leaders said they had been in touch with the ousted Malian president and that he was still safe and under the protection of forces that remained loyal to him at an undisclosed location outside Bamako.

During the day, there were fears by the rebels that the Red Berets were preparing a counterattack against the TV station, and rebel forces set up defensive positions to repel the expected assault. The TV network went off the air several times as gunfire erupted around the station.

According to the BBC's West Africa correspondent, a large number of low-ranking soldiers, possibly the majority, supported the coup, while the majority of the army's officers had not come out publicly to support the coup. Captain Sonogo said in an interview with the BBC that "We are not here to confiscate any power but we are here to have an army and security forces available to assume the national security.... So once this has been fixed, I'll be able to say 'Ok, go for election' in a short period of time. I promise." A joint African Union and Economic Community of West African States (ECOWAS) diplomatic mission met representatives of the junta, according to Mali's state television service.

A group of prominent Malian political figures made an announcement condemning the coup as "a step backwards", including presidential candidate Ibrahim Boubacar Keïta. Political parties that condemned the coup included the Alliance for Democracy in Mali, the Union for the Republic and Democracy, the Patriotic Movement for Renewal, the Union for Democracy and Development, the Union of Democratic Forces for Progress, the Solidarity and Progress Party, the Democracy and Justice Party, and the Party for Democracy and Progress.

A total of 14 government officials and ministers were held hostage in the Kati military barracks outside Bamako.

The Tuareg rebels and the Islamist rebel group Ansar Dine said they had surrounded Kidal. An official statement from the group read: "Thanks to Allah the Almighty and his blessings, we will soon take our land in Kidal."

==== 24 March ====
Sanogo stated that no soldiers of the Malian army remained loyal to Touré, describing himself as "in total control". However, an anonymous source from Sanogo's staff stated that Touré continued to be protected by members of the parachute battalion that had formed his presidential guard. Meanwhile, The New York Times reported an observer describing the situation as "very fluid", and that rumours of a counter-coup continued throughout the day, exacerbated by the hour-long disappearance of the Malian television signal the previous night. A US State Department official also noted that Mali faced a "near-total cutoff of foreign assistance", on which the nation is heavily dependent.

Following reports that men in police and military uniforms were looting shops and stealing cars in Bamako, Sanogo appeared on national television to denounce the "vandalism and pillaging" and state that the perpetrators were opposition forces impersonating soldiers in order to turn public opinion against the coup. Sanogo also announced his intention to seek peace talks with the Tuareg insurgents. According to Mali's state television service, Sanogo also met French ambassador Christian Rouyer along with several other foreign dignitaries.

==== 25 March ====
The Agence France-Presse reported the streets of Bamako were calm but largely deserted due to fears of looting and a petrol (gasoline) shortage. Many businesses remained closed, with Sanogo calling for them to reopen on Tuesday, 27 March.

It was announced that ECOWAS heads of state were planning to hold an emergency meeting in Abidjan on the 27th, the day on which the junta had called for striking civil servants to return to work. A joint delegation from ECOWAS and the AU also began negotiations with the rebel soldiers to restore power to the elected government. Meanwhile, Soumeylou Boubeye Maiga, the detained foreign minister, and 13 other imprisoned officials announced their intention to begin a hunger strike.

The stranded Kenyan and Zimbabwean foreign ministers were evacuated from Mali to Nigeria.

==== 26 March ====
The Barack Obama administration in the U.S. formally suspended aid to Mali, stating that it would only resume when democracy was restored. A thousand-person protest also gathered in Bamako to urge a return to democracy, chanting "Down with Sanogo" and "Liberate the ORTM" (Office de Radiodiffusion-Télévision du Mali).

The Bamako-Sénou International Airport was "partially" reopened for civilian transport.

==== 27 March ====
Ivorian President Alassane Ouattara called on an ECOWAS meeting in Abidjan to send a "strong signal" to the mutinous soldiers that democracy must be restored; he later described Mali's return to democracy as "non-negotiable". Kadre Desire Ouedraogo, the head of the ECOWAS commission, described the coup as "a threat to the entire region". Hundreds of Malian protesters demonstrated at the meeting, calling for a return to civilian rule. Following the meeting, ECOWAS placed peacekeeping troops on standby, hinting at possible military intervention.

Businesses and schools reopened following a call by the CNRDR for them to do so.

A spokesperson for the French embassy confirmed that Ambassador Christian Rouyer had spoken with Touré by telephone, and that Touré had stated that he was safe.

The Tuareg rebellion dismissed calls by Sanogo for a cease-fire and continued its latest offensive.

==== 28 March ====
Amadou Toumani Touré said in an interview with French radio station RFI : "I am free and in my country.... The most important thing for me is not my own position. What is important is democracy, institutions and Mali."

Several thousand Malians took to the streets in the capital to show their support for the junta and reject "foreign interference" as the Economic Community of West African States said it was putting regional troops on standby for any necessary intervention. A violent clash took place at the Labour Exchange, which was serving as an opposition headquarters; a number of coup opponents were reportedly injured by thrown rocks and then arrested by police. Amnesty International called on the government to investigate the assaults and arrest the perpetrators.

The CNRDR announced a new constitution. In one provision, the group pledged that it would not seek office in future elections, and that members of CNRDR would be barred from standing in elections.

==== 29 March ====
The five ECOWAS leaders abandoned their plans to visit Bamako mid-flight after several dozen junta supporters "stormed the airport runway". Their scheduled talks instead took place in Abidjan. ECOWAS announced later in the day that the junta had 72 hours to return power to constitutional authorities, or Mali would face the closure of its land borders and the freezing of its assets in ECOWAS member nations.

Anti-Western sentiment was reported to rise in Bamako due to a perception that the U.S. and France were behind the proposed sanctions. A Radio France correspondent was detained by junta officers, handcuffed, and threatened with extrajudicial execution; he was released the following day.

==== 30 March ====
The MNLA announced its capture of the regional capital of Kidal, including a major military base. Sanogo called on Mali's neighbors to provide military aid to "save the civilian population and Mali's territorial integrity". Sanogo responded that he "understands" the ECOWAS position and reiterated his promise to hold elections, but refused to give a timetable.

The New York Times reported that civil servants had been unable to resume work due to widespread looting by coup soldiers, including the theft of most government computers and the cash from safes.

==== 31 March ====
Gao, a northern regional capital, was taken by the MNLA and Ansar Dine. BBC News described the loss as "a serious blow to the coup leaders".

Representatives of the CNRDR continued negotiations with ECOWAS under the mediation of President Blaise Compaoré of Burkina Faso.

==== 1 April ====
Rebel forces were reported to have encircled Timbuktu, the last major Malian-controlled city of the Azawad. The city was captured later in the day.

Meeting one of ECOWAS's demands, Sanogo announced that the CNRDR would reinstate Mali's previous constitution, and begin "to organise free, open and democratic elections in which we will not participate".

==== 2 April ====
After the junta failed to meet the ECOWAS deadline for relinquishing power, "severe" sanctions against Mali began. The nation's account in the Central Bank of West African States was frozen, and Mali's land borders were closed. As Mali imports most of its petroleum from Côte d'Ivoire, this was expected to cause parts of the country to run out of fuel "within days" as well as shutting down the country's gasoline-dependent electric grid.

==== 3 April ====
The UN Security Council began work on a resolution backing the ECOWAS sanctions against the junta. The U.S. and the African Union joined ECOWAS in announcing a travel ban on the coup's leadership.

The junta announced that it was considering charging Touré with financial misconduct and treason. Sanogo also stated that a "national meeting" would be held on 5 April to decide "what will be best for the country in a consensual, democratic fashion".

Insurgents in Northern Mali looted 2,354 tons of food from World Food Programme warehouses in Gao, Timbuktu, and Kidal causing the organization to suspend food aid to northern Mali. Looting of hospitals, hotels, government offices, and aid offices was reported across the region. Two hundred thousand people had reportedly fled the fighting.

==== 4 April ====
The UN Security Council stated "strong condemnation of the forcible seizure of power from the democratically-elected government" and again called for "the immediate restoration of constitutional rule... and for the preservation of the electoral process."

The coalition of Malian parties opposed to the junta refused to participate in Sanogo's proposed "national meeting".

==== 5 April ====
The fifteen nations of West Africa planned a military intervention against the junta and the Tuareg rebels. French Foreign Minister Alain Juppe said that France would help "on a logistical level".

An MNLA spokesman announced the end of the group's military operations after the capture of Douentza, which the group considered "the frontier of Azawad".

==== 6 April ====
The MNLA declared "irrevocably" the independence of Azawad from Mali. The African Union and the European Union condemned the declaration, the former declaring it "null and of no value whatsoever".

Amnesty International described Mali as "on the brink of a major humanitarian disaster" following the coup and rebellion due to aid agency pull-outs, widespread looting, and widespread reports of violence against girls and women in the north.

Later in the day, ECOWAS and the coup leaders reached an agreement on a transition of power and lifting of sanctions, under which National Assembly of Mali Speaker Dioncounda Traoré would become interim president and oversee new elections. Under the terms of the agreement, the mutinying soldiers would be given amnesty for their participation in the coup.

== Aftermath ==
=== Touré's resignation and later events ===
==== 8 April ====
Amadou Toumani Touré submitted his formal resignation from the presidency to ECOWAS mediators on 8 April 2012, stating, "More than anything, I do it out of the love I have for my country". Amadou Sanogo resigned shortly after.

==== 9 April ====
Mali's constitutional court met to determine the interim president, announcing that Dioncounda Traoré can assume the presidency for up to 40 days in order to organize elections.

==== 12 April ====
Coup leaders formally handed power to Traoré, and the imprisoned ministers and aides from Touré's administration were released. Following Traoré's inauguration, he pledged to "wage a total and relentless war" on the Tuareg rebels unless they released their control of northern Malian cities.

==== 17 April ====
Mali state television announced that Cheick Modibo Diarra has been appointed interim prime minister to help restore civilian rule.

==== 25 April ====
The new civilian government comprising 24 ministers was announced; three ministers (defence, interior and internal security) were from the military and considered to be close to the coup leaders. Sanogo stated that the junta would continue to play a "supervisory" role in the transition.

==== 29 April ====
ECOWAS announced a deadline of a 12-month transition until presidential and legislative elections, and that soldiers would be deployed to Mali to ensure a peaceful transition. Sanogo stated that his government would reject both decisions.

==== 30 April ====
Following reports that the leaders of the "Red Berets" (presidential guard) would be arrested by the junta, Red Berets assaulted OTRM offices and other locations in Mali in an apparent attempt at a countercoup, exchanging fire with pro-junta soldiers. The fighting lasted through the night and resulted in at least 14 deaths and 40 injuries.

The junta seized control of the primary base of anti-junta forces, ending the countercoup. The New York Times described the victory over the countercoup as "a further step in the consolidation of [the junta's] control".

==== 2 May ====
The junta announced that at least 140 Red Berets had been captured following the counter-coup attempt, although later reports put the number at 300, of which 20 died under torture.

==== 15 May ====
ECOWAS released a statement accusing the junta of blocking the return to civilian rule and threatening to re-impose sanctions.

==== 21 May ====
Soldiers allowed a group of pro-coup demonstrators into Traoré's office in Bamako. The demonstrators, who had been carrying a mock coffin with Traoré's name written on it, attacked him, knocking him unconscious. He was brought to Point G Hospital but was not conscious when he was brought in, apparently suffering from a head injury. Three protesters were killed and others wounded when Traoré's security fired on the attackers.

=== Unity government ===
==== 20 August - unity government ====
In an effort to restore stability to Mali following the military coup, a new government of national unity was formed on 20 August and approved by interim President Dioncounda Traoré. Cheick Modibo Diarra, who led the interim government, remained as Prime Minister. The new cabinet consisted of 31 ministers, and five of those were viewed as close to the coup leader, Captain Sanogo. Those who were selected to five posts in the new government were chosen by the military leadership, while at least four members of the previous transitional government, including the interior minister who was responsible for organizing elections, were not changed. None of the selected ministers had close links to the ousted, democratically elected president.

==== 10 December - Diarra arrest and resignation ====
Following weeks in which he lost popular support and the backing of the High Islamic Council, Prime Minister Cheick Modibo Diarra was arrested by soldiers on 10 December and taken to a military base in Kati. BBC News reported that the arrest had been ordered by Capt. Sanogo. According to an eyewitness, soldiers "smashed in the door of the prime minister's residence and took him away a bit violently".

Hours later, the Prime Minister announced his resignation and the resignation of his government on national television. A military spokesman, Oumar Mariko, stated that Diarra had been seeking to "stay in power indefinitely", blocking the transition to democracy, and that he would be detained until a new prime minister was appointed by the president. The New York Times wrote that the resignation "appeared to be the country’s second coup". Mariko opposed the use of the term, telling reporters, "This is not a new coup d'etat".

== International reaction ==
In the days following the March coup d'état, it was "unanimously condemned" by the international community.

=== Intergovernmental organisations ===
- United Nations: In New York, a UN spokesperson said U.N. Secretary-General Ban Ki-moon is following the event with 'deep concern' and called for calm and for grievances to be resolved peacefully and within the democratic process. Ban also reaffirmed the UN's support for the constitutional order in the country. The UN Security Council also called for "the release of all detained Malian officials" and the "immediate restoration of constitutional rule and the democratically elected government".
- African Union: Jean Ping, Chairperson of the African Union Commission, issued a statement that the AU "strongly condemns this act of rebellion, which seriously undermines constitutional legality and constitutes a significant setback for Mali and for the on-going democratic processes on the continent".
- European Union: The European Union condemns the coup and asks for the restoration of the constitutional power as soon as possible. Development operations have also been suspended.
- Inter-Parliamentary Union: Mali was suspended from the IPU until "democracy is restored".

=== National representatives ===
- Algeria: An Algerian government spokesman stated, "we condemn the use of force and firmly reject any unconstitutional changes... We believe that all internal issues in Mali need to be resolved through the country's legitimate institutions."
- Angola: The Foreign Minister of Angola said about the coup: "We are against this kind of power seizure by the force of arms, we think it necessary that they go through the constitution and negotiation path and find a solution that satisfies all parties."
- Argentina: The Foreign Minister of Argentina said: "The Argentine government expresses its profound solidarity with the people of Mali" and request "the strict respect for human rights, the immediate restoration of constitutional order and the legitimate continuation of the ongoing electoral process."
- Brazil: The Ministry of External Relations stated that it is following the situation in Mali with "deep concern", called for the "immediate restoration of constitutional order and democracy" and urged the parties to exert "moderation, to peaceful dialogue and the rejection of the use of force".
- Canada: Minister of Foreign Affairs John Baird stated that "differences must be resolved by dialogue and democratic process, not by force" and called for a return to stability before next month's elections. Canada suspended all aid programs involving direct payments to the government of Mali, while stating that Canadian International Development Agency programs in the country will remain active.
- France: French Foreign Minister Alain Juppé announced France is suspending diplomatic cooperation with Mali.
- Ghana: Ghana "condemned the unwarranted military seizure of power in Mali".
- India: India "expresses its deep concern over the recent developments in Mali and calls for respect of the constitutional order and democratic process in that country".
- Kenya: Kenyan Foreign Affairs minister Moses Wetangula, who was in Bamako at the time of the coup, said after his escape from the country: "This should be the last time such a coup takes place anywhere in the continent. It is not fair for young excited soldiers to drive democratically elected leaders out of office."
- Niger: Niger stated its "total disapproval" of the coup and "condemned all unconstitutional changes".
- Nigeria: The Nigerian government said it refused to recognize the "unconstitutional government" in Mali, and strongly condemned the coup.
- Norway: Foreign Minister Jonas Gahr Støre condemned the coup against Mali's legally elected government and president and urged the military to return power back to the legal authorities as soon as possible.
- People's Republic of China: China "condemned the coup".
- Russia: Russia condemned the coup and "demanded that the junta leaders should restore the constitutional order and ensure the return of the democratically elected president to power".
- Senegal: Senegal expressed its support of the ECOWAS and AU action against the coup, and called on West African nations to "restore, as quickly as possible, the rule of law in Mali".
- South Africa: South Africa condemned the coup and closed its embassy in Bamako.
- Uganda: President Yoweri Museveni condemned the coup, calling on Mali's military to return to its barracks and "let the people decide their future".
- United Kingdom: Minister for Africa Henry Bellingham said the British government is 'deeply concerned' about reports of a coup attempt and condemns any action to undermine democratic rule and the Malian Constitution.
- United States: U.S. State Department spokeswoman Victoria Nuland said the United States condemns the military seizure of power and stands with the legitimately elected government of Touré. All U.S. aid to Mali was suspended on 26 March. However, on 20 April three U.S. military personnel that had been in the country assisting Mali's military before the coup were killed in a car accident in Bamako. Conflicting reasons were offered for why the men had remained in the country, and three women identified by anonymous sources as Moroccan prostitutes were also killed in the vehicle. One of the men was from INSCOM, while the other two were assigned to SOCOM, a special operations unit that is active in counter-terrorism missions.
- Venezuela: Hugo Chávez's government stated "their unconditional solidarity with the people of Mali, while expressing his most resounding rejection of the coup".

=== Other reactions ===
The coup occurred as the head of United Nations Office for West Africa, Said Djinnit, was in the capital for the AU summit and to help mediate the crisis. In response, the World Bank and the African Development Bank suspended development aid funds in support of the AU and ECOWAS reactions to the coup.

Amnesty International noted its concern that the coup foreshadowed a "period of uncertainty on human rights", and called on Sanogo's forces to release their political prisoners from detention. Human Rights Watch called on the CNRDR to "restore basic human rights protections" as well as set a firm timeline to return power to a democratically elected government.

The multinational corporation Randgold Resources' shares fell 13% following the coup, as it owns three gold mines in Mali. However, it asserted that its mining operations in Loulo and Gounkoto and its joint venture in Morila have no disruptions. Gold Fields suspended operations in the country.

== See also ==
- 1968 Malian coup d'état
- 1991 Malian coup d'état
- 2020 Malian coup d'état
- 2021 Malian coup d'état
- List of coups d'état and coup attempts since 2010
