= Yaye Kène Gassama =

Senegalese plant scientist

Yaye Kène Gassama Dia is a Senegalese plant scientist. She is a professor in the department of plant sciences of Cheikh Anta Diop University in Dakar, Senegal. She was the first woman to be appointed to a professorial chair in the sciences in Senegal.

She was Senegal's Minister of Scientific Research in 2005, and in that capacity served as chair of the African Ministerial Council in Science and Technology (AMCOST II). She has also been chair of the African Union High level Panel on Emerging Technologies (APET).

Her research has included work on the use of the neem tree in the treatment and prevention of Malaria.

She has promoted the education of women and girls, through membership of the Advisory Board of the Forum for African Women Educationalists (FAWE) and Female Education in Mathematics and Science in Africa (FEMSA).

She was elected a Member of the Senegal Academy of Science and Technology (Académie nationale des sciences et techniques du Sénégal, ANSTS) in 2004.
