= Nagia Essayed =

Libyan politician

Nagia Mohammed Essayed
- Born: Nagia; Tripoli
- Other name: Mohammed
- Education: University of Tripoli (B.S.); University of Liverpool (M.S., Ph.D.)

Nagia Essayed is a Libyan politician. Essayed was Commissioner for Human Resources, Science, and Technology for the African Union from March 2004 to February 2008.

== Education ==
Essayed obtained a Bachelor of Science degree in engineering from the University of Tripoli. She graduated from the University of Liverpool in England with a Master's degree in civic design in 1970 and with a doctorate in housing and urban design at the University of Liverpool in 1981.

== Lecturer and African Union Commissioner ==
Essayed started her academic career in 1972 at the University of Tripoli as a Lecturer in the Faculty of Engineering. She left her position and served as Assistant Professor and Head of the Urban Planning Department at the University of Garyounis in Benghazi before returning to the University of Tripoli (at the time renamed al-Fateh University) in 1998 as a professor of Housing. Concurrently, from 1972 to 1996.

From March 2004 to February 2028, Essayed was Commissioner for Human Resources, Science, and Technology for the African Union.
