= Omar Gassama =

Gambian politician

Omar Gassama is a Gambian politician. He is a member of the African Union's Economic, Social and Cultural Council, representing West Africa.
