= African Union Department of Agriculture =

Department of the African Union

Department of Agriculture, Rural Development, Blue Economy, and Sustainable Environment
Department overview
- Preceding department: Department of Rural Economy and Agriculture
- Jurisdiction: Africa
- Headquarters: Addis Ababa, Ethiopia
- Department executive: Josefa Sacko, Commissioner
- Parent department: African Union Commission
- Website: au.int/en/arbe

The Department of Agriculture, Rural Development, Blue Economy, and Sustainable Environment (ARBE) is a department of the African Union (AU) dedicated to promoting sustainable agricultural development, rural economy growth, the blue economy, and environmental sustainability across Africa.

== Mandate ==
The department's mandate includes:

- Promoting the implementation of Agenda 2063 Continental Frameworks such as the Comprehensive Africa Agriculture Development Programme (CAADP).
- Supporting agricultural and rural development.
- Developing policies and strategies to ensure food security and nutrition.
- Assisting member states in achieving sustainable growth through sound environmental and natural resources management.
- Promoting rural community initiatives and technology transfer.
- Coordinating efforts to eradicate poverty.
- Combating desertification and drought, including initiatives like the Great Green Wall for the Sahara and Sahel Initiative (GGWSSI).
- Supporting Multilateral Environment Agreements (MEAs), Land Policy Initiative (LPI), Global Framework for Climate Services (GFCS), and Disaster Risk Reduction (DRR).
- Implementing projects like the Partnership for Aflatoxin Control in Africa (PACA), African Fertilizer Financing Mechanism (AFFM), and the African Seed and Biotechnology Program (ASBP).
- Promoting disaster mitigation policies and strategies.
- Harmonizing policies among the Regional Economic Communities (RECs).
- Conducting research on climate change, water and sanitation, and land management.

== Structure ==
=== Commissioner ===
Josefa Leonel Correia Sacko, (elected January 2017).

=== Director ===
Godfrey Bahiigwa (Uganda)

=== Divisions ===
- Agriculture and Food Security Division
- Rural Development Division
- Sustainable Environment Division
- Blue Economy Division

=== Technical Offices ===
- AU Inter-African Phytosanitary Council (IAPSC)
- AU–Inter-African Bureau for Animal Resources (AU–IBAR)
- Pan African Veterinary Vaccine Centre (PANVAC)
- Pan African Tsetse and Trypanosomiasis Eradication Campaign (PATTEC)
- Semi-Arid Food Grain Research and Development (SAFGRAD)

== See also ==
- African Union
- Agenda 2063
