= African Union Department of Economic Development, Trade, Tourism, Industry, Mining =

Department of the African Union

- Abbreviation: ETTIM
- Type: Department
- Headquarters: Addis Ababa, Ethiopia
- Parent organization: African Union
- Website: au.int/en/ettim

The Department of Economic Development, Trade, Tourism, Industry, Mining (ETTIM) is a department of the African Union responsible for promoting economic development, job creation, and industrialization across the African continent. The department's main objective is to develop policies, strategies, and programmes that promote intra-African trade and investment, as well as attract foreign direct investment.

== Key responsibilities ==
ETTIM focuses on the following key areas:

- Economic development and job creation
- Promoting intra-African trade and investment Developing strategies for industrialization
- Facilitating tourism development
- Enhancing trade policies and agreements
- Attracting foreign direct investment

=== Divisions ===
- Economic Development
- Trade
- Tourism
- Industry
- Mining

== See also ==
- African Union
- Agenda 2063
- African Continental Free Trade Area (AfCFTA)
