= African Union Department of Political Affairs, Peace and Security =

Department of the African Union

Department of Political Affairs, Peace and Security
Department overview
- Formed: November 2018
- Preceding agencies: Department of Political Affairs; Department of Peace and Security
- Jurisdiction: Africa
- Headquarters: Addis Ababa, Ethiopia
- Department executive: Bankole Adeoye, Commissioner
- Parent department: African Union Commission
- Website: www.peaceau.org

The Department of Political Affairs, Peace and Security (PAPS) is a department of the African Union (AU) responsible for promoting peace, security, governance, democracy, and human rights across Africa. PAPS was established in November 2018 following the merger of the AU's former Department of Political Affairs and the Department of Peace and Security.

== History ==
PAPS was created during the Eleventh Extraordinary Session of the AU Assembly held in Addis Ababa, Ethiopia, on 17–18 November 2018. The merger aimed to streamline the AU's institutional structure and enhance its capacity to address political, peace, and security challenges on the continent. Bankole Adeoye assumed office as the AU Commissioner for Political Affairs, Peace and Security in March 2021, following his election at the 34th AU Summit in February 2021.

== Mandate ==
The department's mandate aligns with the broader Pan-African vision outlined in Agenda 2063, particularly Aspirations 3 and 4, which envision "an Africa of good governance, respect for human rights, justice and the rule of law" and "a peaceful and secure Africa." PAPS contributes to the efforts of AU Member States, Regional Economic Communities (RECs), and Regional Mechanisms (RMs) in conflict prevention, resolution, and crisis management.

=== Core Functions ===
PAPS performs a range of functions, including:

- Continuous monitoring of Africa’s political, peace, and security trends.
- Timely assessment, analysis, and reporting on these trends through early warning systems.
- Supporting conflict prevention through legal and policy frameworks.
- Providing capacity building and training on governance, political, peace, and security issues. Coordinating the development of Common African Positions (CAP) on relevant issues.
- Promoting synergy in implementing the African Governance Architecture (AGA) and the African Peace and Security Architecture (APSA).
- Supporting peace-support operations, mediation, and dialogue interventions.
- Assisting in post-conflict reconstruction and development.

== See also ==
- African Union
- African Peace and Security Architecture
- Agenda 2063
