= Carthage Film Festival =

Annual film festival held in Tunis, Tunisia

Coordinates: 36°48′23″N 10°10′54″E

Carthage Film Festival أيام قرطاج السينمائية Journées cinématographiques de Carthage
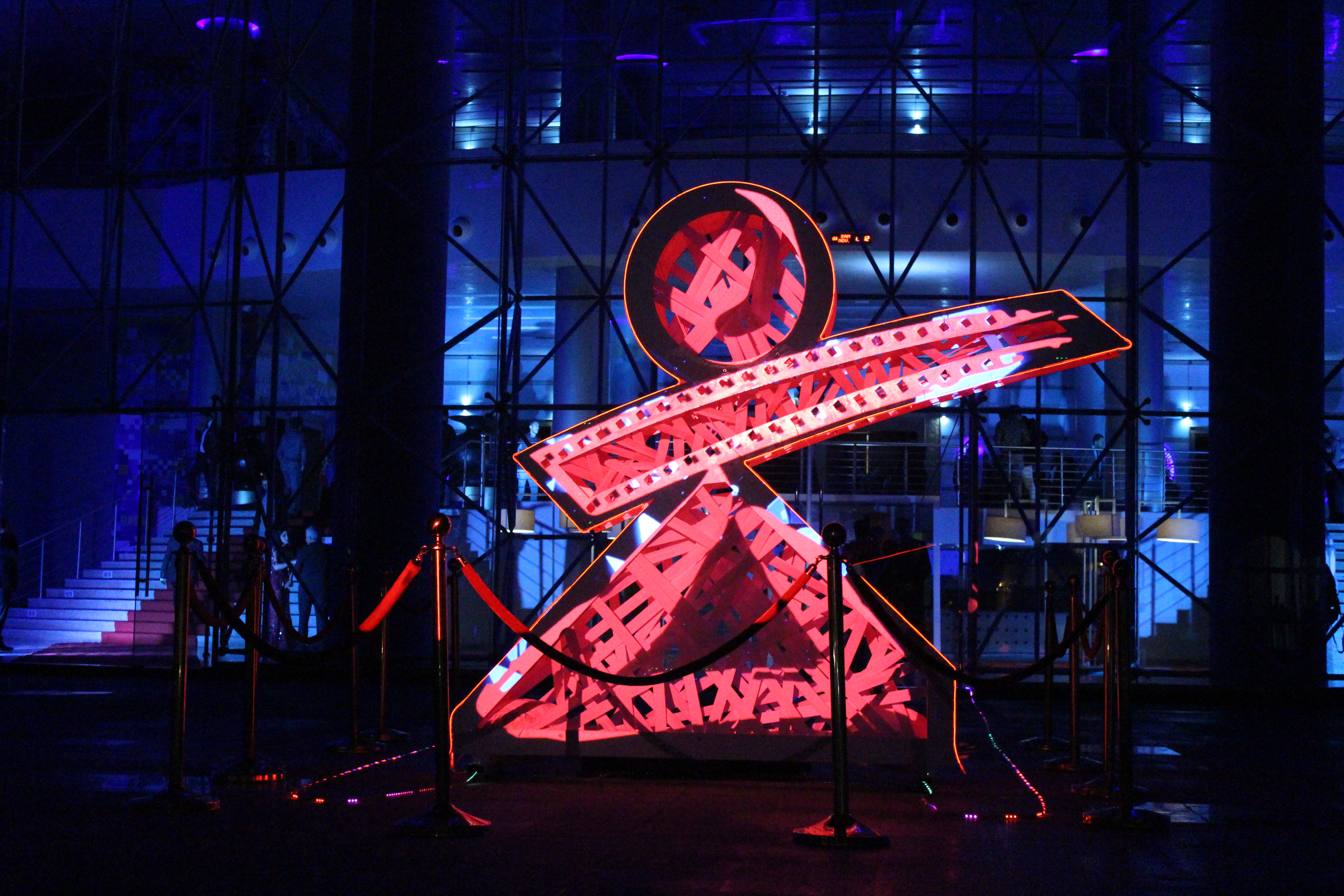
- Location: Tunis, Tunisia
- Founded: 1966; 60 years ago
- Awards: Tanit d'or
- Language: French; Arabic; English
- Website: http://www.jcctunisie.org/

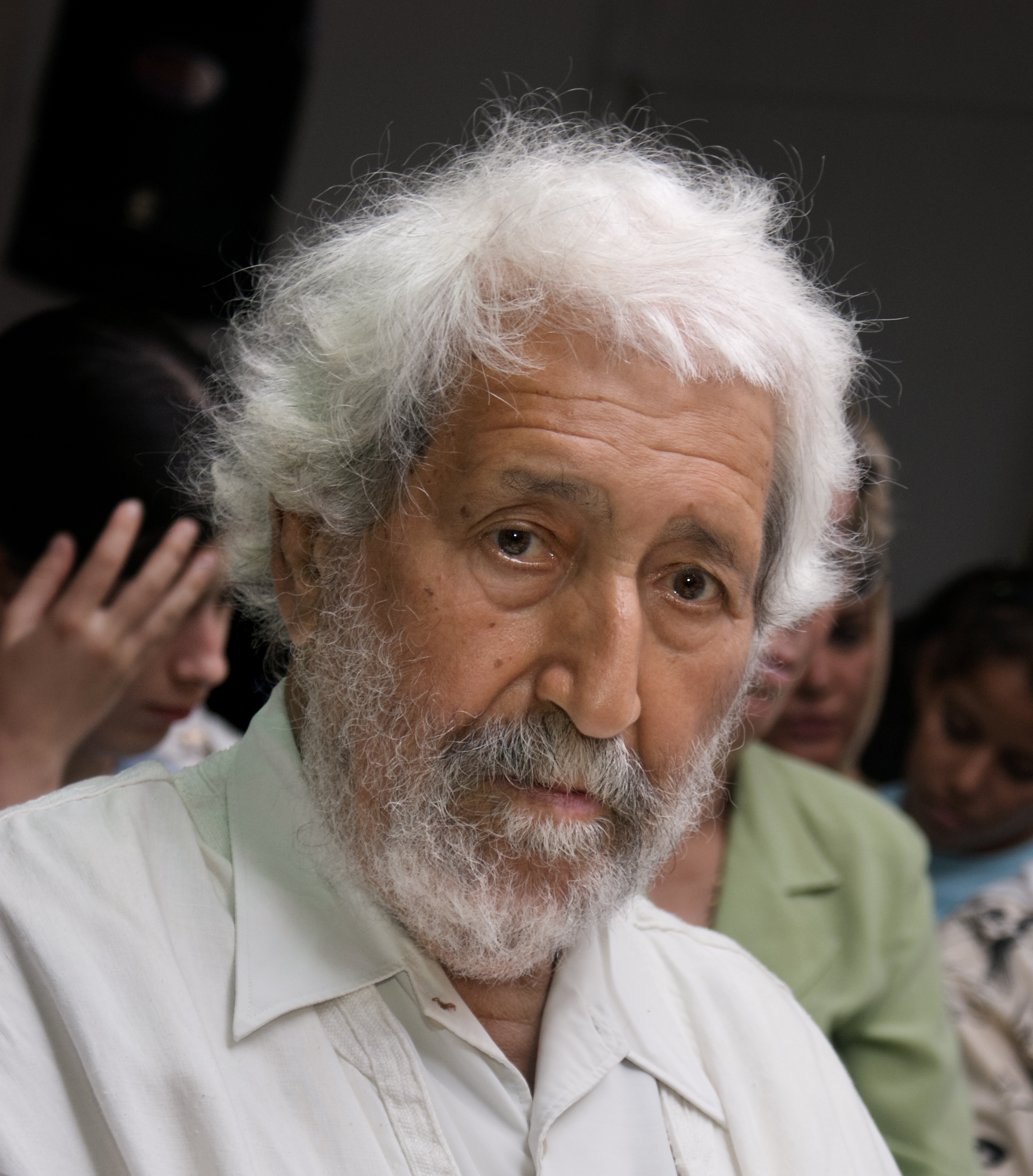
Tahar Cheriaa, creator of the Carthage Film Festival

Carthage Film Festival (Journées cinématographiques de Carthage, or JCC) is an annual film festival that takes place in Tunis, founded in 1966. It is also known by its Arabic title, أيام قرطاج السينمائية ("Cinema Days of Carthage"). Initially biennial, alternating with the Carthage Theatre Festival, the festival became an annual event in 2014.

A directing committee chaired by the Tunisian Ministry of Culture, joined with professionals of the cinema industry, is in charge of the organization. The Carthage Film Festival has been designed as a film festival engaged in the cause of African and Arab countries and enhancing Global South cinema in general. The main prize awarded is the Tanit d'or ("Golden Tanit"), named after the Carthaginian goddess Tanit. Opening and closing ceremonies are held in the Théâtre municipal de Tunis (Municipal Theater of Tunis).

The festival's 36th edition took place from 12 to 20 December 2025. The executive director for the 2025 edition was Tarek Ben Chaâbane.

== History ==
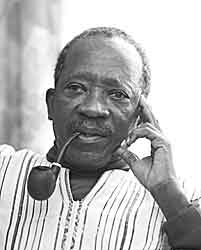
Ousmane Sembène, who won the first Tanit d'or in 1966 (photo taken 1987)

Conceived by filmmaker Tahar Cheriaa and officially launched in 1966 by the Tunisian Minister of Culture, Chedli Klibi, this event, the first of its kind in the Arab world, was primarily conceived to highlight sub-Saharan African and Arab cinema, creating bridges of dialogue between North and South and offering a meeting between regional filmmakers and moviegoers.It was named Journées cinématographiques de Carthage (JCC) and is also known by its Arabic title, أيام قرطاج السينمائية ("Cinema Days of Carthage"), and is called Carthage Film Festival in English.

Senegalese filmmaker Ousmane Sembène, who won the Golden Tanit with his feature film La Noire de... in 1966, afterwards worked with the politician Alimata Salembéré to create another major festival on the African continent, FESPACO (Festival Panafricain du Cinéma et de la Télévision de Ouagadougou), inaugurated in Burkina Faso in 1969. The Pan African Federation of Filmmakers (French: Fédération Panafricaine des Cinéastes; FEPACI) was officially established in 1970 at the Carthage Film Festival, developing a foundation for South-South film cooperation.

Over the years the Carthage Film Festival has introduced workshops, master classes, and the Producer's Network to better support filmmakers. Prominent figures from the arts have served as jurors in various official competitions.

Numerous prominent African and Arab filmmakers have first been recognized at Carthage before going on to receive broader recognition, including the Senegalese Sembene Ousmane (Grand Prize 1966), Egyptian Youssef Chahine (Grand Prize 1970), Malian Souleymane Cissé (Grand Prize 1982), the Palestinian Michel Khleifi (Grand Prize 1988), Tunisians Taïeb Louhichi (1st Tunisian Golden Tanit for short film 1972) Nouri Bouzid, Ferid Boughedir, and Moufida Tlatli (Grand Prize 1986, 1990, 1994), and the Syrian Mohammad Malas (Grand Prize 1992) and Algerian Merzak Allouache (Grand Prize 1996).

The festival's social dimension is reflected in several Golden Tanit award-winning films, such as the Making Of (2006) by Nouri Bouzid, featuring Bahta, a 25-year-old unemployed amateur break dancer recruited by extremists to commit a suicide attack.

On 19 October 2023, the festival's management announced that, following a decision by the Tunisian Ministry of Culture, the 34th edition of the festival had been canceled “in light of the unacceptable tragedy currently being endured by the Palestinian people, and in solidarity with the Palestinian people, as expressed at the highest level in Tunisia.” This decision sparked incomprehension, disappointment among the festival team, and a joint statement from the artistic community calling for “an immediate reversal of this hasty decision”.

== Program and awards ==
The official program includes several sections: the "Official Competition" and the "Panorama section" which are open to Arab and African films; the "International section" which is open to recent movies of high artistic quality; a "Tribute section" and "Workshop Projects" designed to encourage the development of Arab and African film projects by granting "help funds for scenario" and a competitive video section.

The official selection: The various sections of the Official Competition of the Carthage Film Festival each present 12 films.

The official competition for feature films: This selection with three Tanit (Gold, Silver, and Bronze) is the most visible part of the Carthage Film Festival and is the heart of the official selection. Twelve Arab and African films reflect the renewal of cinematographic expression and present original works singular in their aesthetic and their statements.

The official short film competition: As well as the competition dedicated to feature films, this selection allows the dedication of three Arab and African fiction short format films (less than 30 minutes).

The documentary competition: A Golden Tanit awards the best documentary among twelve Arab and African films. The Prize Tahar Cheriaa for a first work: The Golden Tanit "Tahar Cheriaa" awards the first work of a filmmaker presented in the official selection: official Competition, competition of the first Arab and African film.

Carthage Ciné-Foundation: This international selection of twelve school films embodies the diversity of young artists and announces the trends of the future of world cinema. A film will be awarded by an international jury.

Parallel sections

New Territories

This program aims to be a window on recent suggested films, the most innovative and subversive, the most radical and marginal, in a word, on new aesthetic and political experiences, far from any commercial format, media, or festival. It seeks to submit the continually renewed ability of cinema to house within it both the issues of its time and the questions of those who make it and their contemporaries, as well as the shifting of its artistic, formal, and technological expression.

Tribute: Each edition pays tribute to a Tunisian filmmaker and several international filmmakers, offering the public a retrospective of their films or debate meetings inspired by their careers.

Carthage Professional Takmil The Takmil workshop, namely "finish" in Arabic, which is in its second edition, aims to allow African and Arab films in the post-production phase to be evaluated by an international jury of cinema professionals. For three days, working copies are viewed by the jury in the presence of the filmmakers whose films have been selected. Screenings will be followed by a discussion allowing each participant to defend his film and benefit from expertise. The workshop Takmil also aims to be a platform offering visibility to young African and Arab filmmaking. The visibility will result in particular from the screening of the winning films, an African and Arab premiere during the Carthage Film Festival session following their finishing.

Producers Network: The Producers Network hosts Arab and African producers present at the Carthage Film Festival and allows international film professionals to benefit from a series of meetings and specific events designed to encourage international co-production and optimize networking. With a 48-hour program, the Producers Network offers real opportunities to meet with potential partners with financing, co-production, and distribution needs.

The Carthage Film Festival in regions

Since the 2014 session, the Carthage Film Festival has moved between different Tunisian cities. In 2015 ten cities hosted the festival: Jendouba, Sfax, Mahdia, Tataouine, Nabeul, Béja, Kef, Kairouan, Gafsa and Monastir. The films are divided into three main sections:

- The films of the official selection: these films are screened in the evening during the festival period in each host city.
- European films: In partnership with the Journées du Cinéma Européen, a selection of European films is screened daily in different cities.
- In partnership with UNICEF two children's movies are screened in each city.

== Editions ==
Edition	Dates	Tanit d'or	Tanit d'argent	Tanit de bronze
1st	4-11 December 1966	La Noire de... Ousmane Sembène (Senegal)	The Cry by Jaromil Jireš (Czechoslovakia)	Not awarded
2nd	13-20 October 1968	Not awarded	The Night Watchman by Khalil Chawki (Iraq)	Mokhtar by Sadok Ben Aïcha (Tunisia)
3rd	11-18 October 1970	The body of work of Youssef Chahine (Egypt) Le Choix	Des hommes au soleil by Nabil Maleh, Marouane El Mouadhen et Mohamed Chahine (Syria)	Wechma de Hamid Bénani (Marocco) Une si simple histoire by Abdellatif Ben Ammar (Tunisia) Khlifa the Ringworm by Hamouda Ben Halima (Tunisia)
4th	30 September- 8 October 1972	Les Dupes by Tawfiq Saleh (Syria) Sambizanga by Sarah Maldoror (Zaire) My Village, a Village among Others by Taïeb Louhichi (Tunisia)	The Charcoal Maker by Mohamed Bouamari (Algeria)	And Tomorrow? Brahim Babaï (Tunisia) Lambaaye de Mahama Johnson Traoré (Senegal) The Cruel Sea by Khaled Al Siddiq
5th	26 October -2 November 1974	Arabs and Niggers, Your Neighboursby Med Hondo (Mauritania) Kafr kasem by Borhane Alaouié (Libya / Syria)	Sejnane by Abdellatif Ben Ammar (Tunisia)	Not awarded
6th	14-23 October 1976	The Ambassadors de Naceur Ktari (Tunisie / Libya / France)	Muna Moto by Jean-Pierre Dikongué Pipa (Cameroon)	Nationality: Immigration by Sidney Sokhona (Mauritania)
7th	16-26 October 1978	The Adventures of a Hero by Merzak Allouache (Algeria)	Baara by Souleymane Cissé (Mali)	Chafika et Metwalli by Ali Badrakhan (Egypt)
8th	15-23 November 1980	Aziza d'Abdellatif Ben Ammar (Tunisia)	Ali au pays des mirages d'Ahmed Rachedi (Algeria)	Fad'jal by Safi Faye (Senegal)
9th	22-30 October 1982	The Wind (Binye) by Souleymane Cissé (Mali)	God's Gift (Wend Kuni) by Gaston Kaboré (Burkina Faso)	Not awarded
10th	12-21 October 1984	Dreams of the City Mohamed Malas (Syria)	Porté disparu de Mohamed Khan (Egypt)	Les Cooperants by Arthur Si-Bita (Cameroon)
11th	14-25 October 1986	L'Homme de cendres de Nouri Bouzid (Tunisia)	Mr. Fabre's Windmill (Tahûna al amm Fabre) by Ahmed Rachedi (Algeria)	Nyamanton by Cheick Oumar Sissoko (Mali)
12th	21-29 October 1988	Wedding in Galilee by Michel Khleifi (Palestine)	Zan Boko by Gaston Kaboré (Burkina Faso)	Arab by Fadhel Jaïbi and Fadhel Jaziri (Tunisia)
13th	26 October-3 November 1990	Halfaouine Child of the Terraces by Férid Boughedir (Tunisia)	Rose of the Desert by Rachid Benhadj (Algeria)	Mortu Nega by Flora Gomes (Guinea-Bissau)
14th	2-10 October 1992	The Night by Mohamed Malas (Syria)	Samba Traoré by Idrissa Ouedraogo(Burkina Faso)	Les Yeux bleus de Yonta by Flora Gomes (Guinea-Bissau)
15th	12-19 November 1994	The Silences of the Palace by Moufida Tlatli (Tunisia)	Bab El-Oued City de Merzak Allouache (Algeria)	The Golden Ball by Cheik Doukouré (Guinea)
16th	11- 20 October 1996	Hi Cousin! by Merzak Allouache (Algeria)	Po di sangui de Flora Gomes (Guinea-Bissau)	Haïfa de Rashid Masharawi(Palestine)
17th	23-31 October 1998	Living in Paradise by Bourlem Guerdjou (Algeria)	عرق البلح (فيلم) by Redwan al-Kashif (Egypt)	Faraw! Mother of Dunes d'Abdoulaye Ascofaré (Mali)
18th	20-28 October 2000	Dôlè de Imunga Ivanga (Gabon)	Closed Doors Atef Hetata (Egypt)	Be My Friend by Naceur Ktari (Tunisia)
19th	18-26 October 2002	The Price of Forgiveness by Mansour Sora Wade (Senegal)	Clay Dolls by Nouri Bouzid (Tunisia)	Hijack Stories by Oliver Schmitz (South Africa)
20th	2-9 October 2004	In Casablanca, Angels Don't Fly by Mohamed Asli (Morocco)	Zulu Love Letter by Ramadan Suleman (South Africa)	Dreamy Visions by Waha Al Raheb (Syria)
21st	11-18 November 2006	Making of by Nouri Bouzid (Tunisia)	Daratt de Mahamat Saleh Haroun (Chad)	Waiting by Rashid Masharawi (Palestine)
22nd	25 October - 1 November 2008	Teza by Hailé Gerima (Ethiopia)	Laila's Birthday by Rashid Masharawi (Palestine)	Khamsa de Karim Dridi (Tunisia)
23d	23-31 October 2010	Microphone by Ahmad Abdalla (Egypt)	The Trip to Algiers by Abdelkrim Bahloul (Algeria)	The Mosque by Daoud Aoulad-Syad (Marocco)
24th	16-24 November 2012	La Pirogue by Moussa Touré (Senegal)	Death for Sale by Faouzi Bensaïdi (Morocco)	Coming Forth by Day by Hala Lotfy (Egypt)
25th	29 November-6 December 2014	Omar by Hany Abu-Assad (Palestine)	They are the Dogs by Hicham Lasri (Morocco)	Before Snowfall de Hisham Zaman (Iraq)
26th	21-28 November 2015	The Blind Orchestra by Mohamed Mouftakir (Morocco)	The Endless River Oliver Hermanus (South Africa)	As I Open My Eyes by Leyla Bouzid (Tunisia / France / Belgium)
27th	28 October-5 November 2016	Zaineb Hates the Snow bu Kaouther Ben Hania (Tunisia)	Clash by Mohamed Diab (Egypt)	3000 Nights by Mai Masri (Palestine)
28th	4-11 November 2017	The Train of Salt and Sugar by Licínio Azevedo (Mozambique)	The Wound by John Trengove (South Africa)	Volubilis by Faouzi Bensaïdi (Morocco)
29th	3-10 November 2018	Fatwa de Mahmoud Ben Mahmoud (Tunisia)	Yomeddine by Abu Bakr Shawky (Egypt)	War Travelers by Joud Saïd (Syria)
30th	26 October-2 November 2019	Noura's Dream by Hinde Boujemaa (Tunisia)	Atlantique by Mati Diop (Senegal)	Scales by Shahad Ameen (Saudi Arabia)
31st	7-12 November 2020	Not awarded	Not awarded	Not awarded
32nd	30 October-6 November 2021	Feathers by Omar El Zohairy (Egypt)	This Is Not a Burial, It's a Resurrection by Lemohang Jeremiah Mosese (Lesotho)	Insurrection by Jilani Saadi (Tunisia)
33rd	29 October-5 November 2022	Tug of War by Amil Shivji (Tanzania)	Under the Fig Trees by Erige Sehiri (Tunisia)	Sharaf by Samir Nasr (Egypt)
34th	28 October-4 November 2023	Not awarded	Not awarded	Not awarded
35th	14 October-21 December 2024	Red Path by Lotfi Achour (Tunisia)	To a Land Unknown by Mahdi Fleifel (Palestine)	Demba by Mamadou Dia (Senegal)
36th	12 December-20 December 2025	The Stories by Abu Bakr Shawky (Egypt)	My Father's Shadow by Akinola Davies Jr. (Nigeria)	Sink de Zain Duraie (Jordan)
