= Tanit d'or =

Highest prize awarded at the Carthage Film Festival

The Tanit d'or is the grand prize of the Carthage Film Festival, hosted annually in Tunisia. The award is named after Tanit, the lunar goddess of ancient Carthage and takes the shape of her symbol, a triangle surmounted by a horizontal line and a circle.

== Winners ==
Previous winners of the Tanit d'or include:

- 1976: Les Ambassadeurs by Naceur Ktari
- 1988: Wedding in Galilee, by Michel Khleifi, Palestine
- 1992: The Night (Arabic: الليل) (Mohamed Malas, Syria)
- 1994: Les silences du palais (Arabic: صمت القصور) (Moufida Tlatli, Tunisia)
- 1996: Salut cousin (Merzak Allouache, Algeria)
- 1998: Vivre au paradis (Bourlem Guerdjou, Algeria)
- 2000: Dolé (Imunga Ivanga, Gabon)
- 2002: Le prix du pardon (Mansour Sora Wade, Senegal)
- 2004: A Casablanca, les anges ne volent pas (Mohamed Asli, Morocco)
- 2006: Making-Off (Arabic: آخر فيلم) (Nouri Bouzid, Tunisia)
- 2010: Microphone (Arabic:ميكروفون) (Ahmad Abdalla, Egypt)
- 2018: Fatwa (Arabic: فتوى) (Mahmoud Ben Mahmoud, Tunisia)
- 2022: Tug of War (Swahili: Vuta N'Kuvute) (Amil Shivji, Tanzania)
- 2024: Red Path (French: Les Enfants rouges) (Lotfi Achour, Tunisia)
- 2025: The Stories (Arabic: القصص) (Abu Bakr Shawky, Egypt)
