= Sayada, Tunisia =

City in Monastir Governorate, Tunisia

Sayada صـيادة
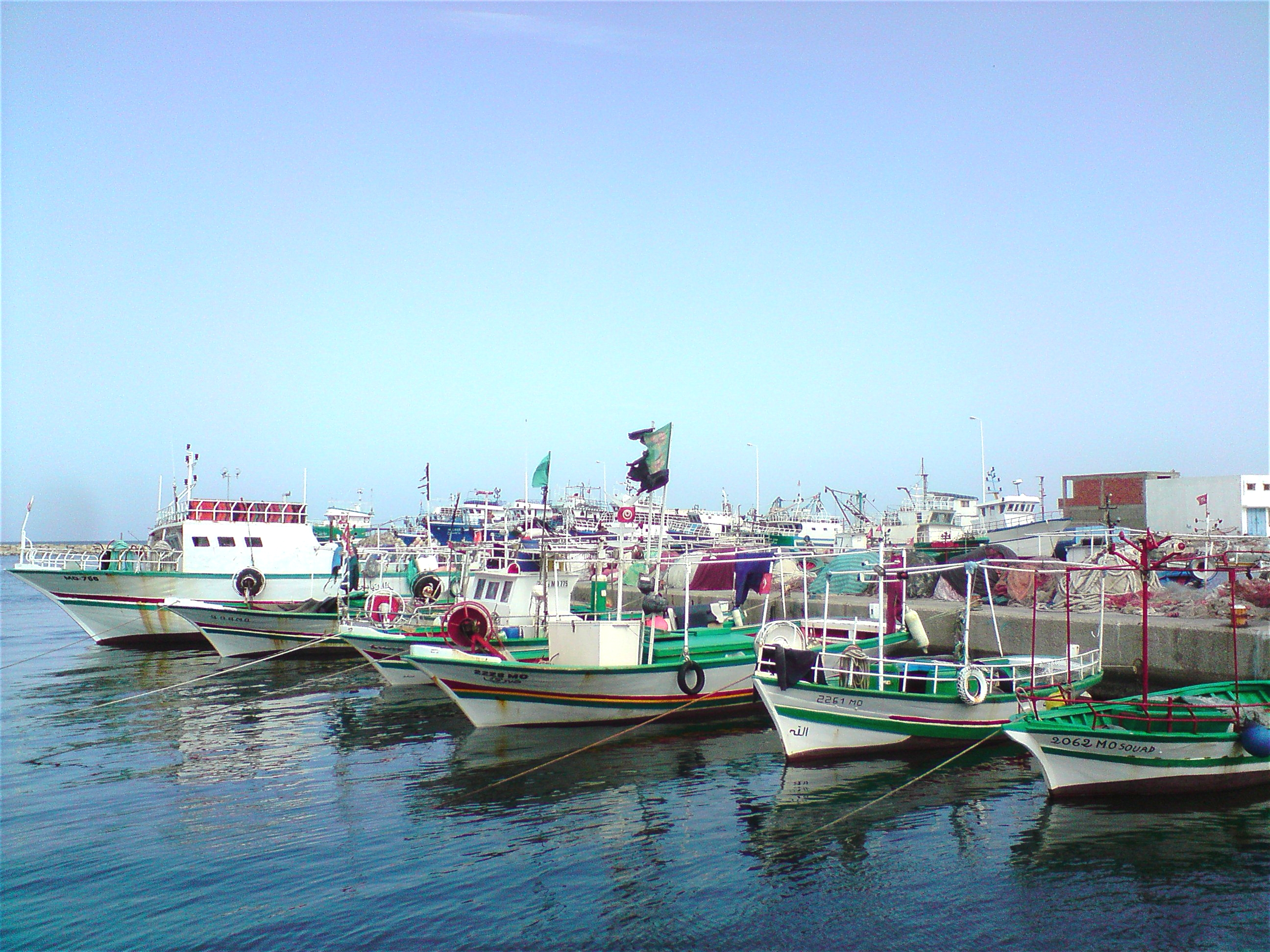
- Port

- Seal

- Location in Tunisia
- Coordinates: 35°40′N 10°54′E
- Country: Tunisia
- Governorate: Monastir Governorate

Area
  - Total: 4.50 km^{2} (1.74 sq mi)

Population (2022)
  - Total: 13,711
  - Density: 2,824/km^{2} (7,310/sq mi)
- Time zone: UTC+1 (CET)
- Postal code: 5035

Sayada (Tunisian Arabic: صيادة) is a city in the Sahel region of Tunisia. It is located about fifteen kilometers south of Monastir. It is part of the administrative governorate of Monastir, and is the county seat of the Sayada-Lamta-Bou Hajar Delegation which has a population of 22,944.

== Description ==
The town is based around a small hill that overlooks the Gulf of Monastir and the two small islands that make up the Kuriat archipelago. The built up area extends for over a mile in every direction from the hill but especially towards the flat tidal area.

Sayada is joined in a "delegation" with the smaller communities of Bouhjar and Lemta (which historically was known as Leptiminus and is still the site of international archaeology). Sayada itself is within the Monastir Governorate which administers the larger area from the city Monastir which is 12 miles inland.

== Born here ==
- Rachid Ammar, Chief of Staff of the Tunisian Armed Forces
- Tahar Cheriaa, film critic and creator of the Carthage Film Festival
- Naceur Ktari, award-winning film director
