= Fares Al-Helou =

Syrian actor (born 1961)

Fares Al-Helou فارس الحلو
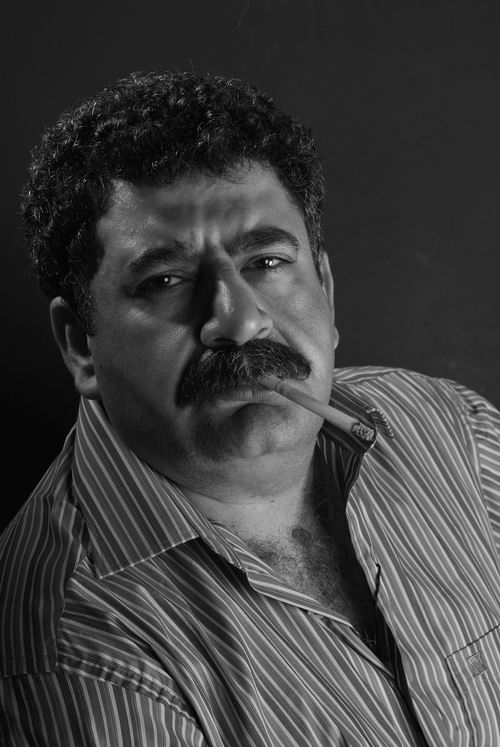
- Al-Helou in 2015
- Born: 15 August 1961 (age 65); Mashta al-Helu, Syria
- Occupations: Actor, Comedian, Activist
- Spouse: Soulafa Oueschek

Fares Al-Helou (Arabic: فارس الحلو; born 15 August 1961), also spelled Fares Helou, is a Syrian actor. Since his graduation from the Syrian Higher Institute for Dramatic Arts in 1984, he has appeared in numerous plays, TV and cinema productions, both in Syria and in France.

== Biography ==
Al-Helou was born into a Christian family in Mashta al-Helu, Syria. He graduated from the Higher Institute of Dramatic Arts in Damascus in 1984, and soon after, he played a role in Mohammad Malas’s second feature film, The Night (1992).

Along with the cast of the film, he participated in the 2002 Cannes Film Festival to present the film Sacrifices, directed by Ossama Mohammed. It was presented in the festival's section "Un certain regard".

In 2007, he won the best actor award at the "Valencia Film Festival" for his role in the movie "Public relations". Al-Helou is considered to be the first Syrian actor to win a Best Actor award on an international level.

== Filmography ==
"Days and Nights of the Heart Tree" (2015–2016): In Paris, Fares Al-Helou plays the role of the storyteller in the ballet opera "Days and Nights of the Heart Tree" by Franco-Algerian writer/composer Tarik Benouarka. The 80-minute operatic work has been written in Arabic language and combines Western classical music, opera singing, poetry and dance. This work was dedicated by the artist to an orchestra that is unique in the world – the Orchestra El Nour Wal Amal – a classical music ensemble of Egyptian blind women musicians.

=== Television ===
- The Bureau (Le Bureau des légendes) (French TV series, 2015, 2016)
- Wjouh wa amaken (Faces and places) (2015)
- Alhasan wa alhusien (2011)
- Dalela wa elzaabak (2011)
- Kashf el akneaa (Revealing Masks) (2011)
- Laanet Alteen (2010)
- Taght sharqy (Arabic: تخت شرقي) (Eastern bed) (2010)
- Al zelzal (Earthquake) (2010)
- Spotlight season 7 (2010)
- Agher Ayam Alhob (2009)
- Alhosrom al-shami season 1,2 and 3 (2007-2009)
- Jeeran (2008)
- Alwarda Al-aghera (2006)
- Haseeba (2006)
- Barood ..Ahrbo (2006)
- Madrast Al-aastaz bahjt (2006)
- Arabiat (2003)
- Zaman elwsol (2002)
- Had Al-hawya (2002)
- Sham shereef (2001)
- Ahlam la tamot (2001)
- Seert Al-Eljalaly (2000)
- Agher ayam eltot (1999)
- Albahar (1998)
- Al-thorya (1998)
- Alfaray (1997)
- Ahalam abu alhana (1997)
- Sawt alfadaa alranan (1996)
- Nihayat Rajol Shojaa (1994)
- E'elet Khams Njom (1993)
- Eskan alreh (1992)

=== Theater ===
- Les Jours et les Nuits de l’Arbre Coeur (2015)
- Non si paga (1992)
- La Baruffe chiozzotte (1989)
- The cave dwellers (1988)
- The adventure of the head of Mamlouk Jabir (1984)
- Chronicle of a Death Foretold (1984)
- Skan el kahef (Arabic: سكان الكهف)
- The story of a spoken death (Arabic: قصة موت معلن) - Supermarket - A scandal at the port

=== Cinema ===
- The Translator (2021)
- A Comedian in a Syrian Tragedy (2019)
- The Night (1999)
- Public relations (2005)
- Swndok al-dounia (2002)
- The Last Appearance of the Damascene Guilan (2008)
- Demashq ma hobi (Damascus with love) (2010)
