= Henry Schwarcz =

Henry P. Schwarcz is a Canadian geochemist, having been a University Distinguished Professor at McMaster University. Using methods like stable isotope analysis and x-ray scattering, his research spans from paleoclimatology to paleoanthropology, including work on stalagmites from Vancouver Island and skeletal remains from the Roman settlement of Leptiminus.
