= Pia Colombo =

French singer and actress (1934–1986)

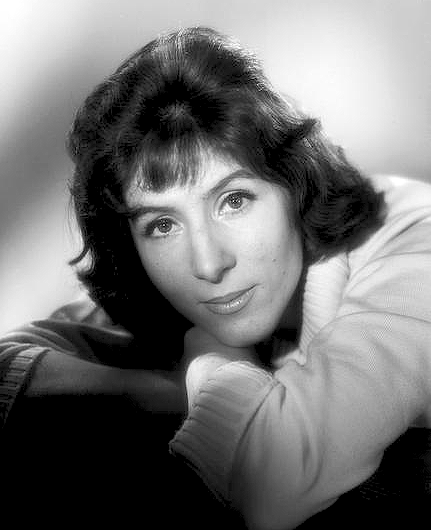
Pia Colombo

Pia Colombo (6 July 1934, in Homblières, Aisne, France – 16 April 1986) was a French singer of Franco-Italian origin, born Eliane Marie Amélie Pia Colombo who acted in radio, cinema and television between 1956 and 1981.

Her father was from Milan and her mother came from the Nord.

She was compared to Édith Piaf and was believed to be her successor when Piaf died in 1963 but Colombo was too intellectual for the taste of the general public.

== Path ==
Politically committed, Colombo was a big interpreter of the work of her husband, the composer Maurice Fanon, and of Serge Gainsbourg, Jacques Brel, Georges Brassens, Kurt Weill, Hanns Eisler and others.

In the 1960s, she acted in Roger Planchon's productions of Bertolt Brecht's works.

She acted in the Popular National Theatre, Théâtre des Champs-Élysées, Théâtre du Châtelet Olympia of Paris, Bobino, Festival d'Avignon and popularised the songs of Léo Ferré.

Colombo died of cancer when 51 years old and her body was buried in the Père Lachaise Cemetery in Paris.

== Integral recordings ==
- Pia Colombo – À Casa d'Irène (1964–1965)
- Pia Colombo – Florilège (1959–1971)
- Pia Colombo – Le bal de quartier (1959–1962)
- Pia Colombo – Le Mauvais Larron (1957–1964)
- Pia Colombo – Tique Taque (1959–1960)
- Pia Colombo – Le métèque (1967–1969)
- Pia Colombo – Adagio Nocturne (1971)
- Pia Colombo – Chante Bertolt Brecht & Kurt Weill (1969)

== Prizes ==
- Coq d'Or of the chanson française 1959: Them flonflons du bal.
- Prix of l'Académie Charles-Cros of the Chanson (1969)

== Cinema ==
- 1969: Oh! What a Lovely War – Film by Richard Attenborough. - Estaminet Singer
- 1969: Une si simple histoire – Film by Abdellatif Ben Ammar
- 1974: Parade – Film by Jacques Tati - Circus performer (Last appearance)

== Publications ==
- Revue Lectures D'Aujourd'hui N°411 1960: Pia Colombo.
- L'Humanité: "To l'Olympia, l'embarras du choix avec GB, Pia Colombo" –
- Him Nouvel Observateur: Chanson: Piaf et Colombe
- L'Aurore: "Pia Colombo s'oppose à Brigitte Bardot" – 1979
- The genèse et l'enregistrement du titre "The Rue des Rosiers" 1967
- "Him Nightclub rive gauche" – Livre écrit pair Gilles Schlesser (Éditions l'Archipel) 682 pages – Cahier photo 16 pages.
- L'Humanité: "Pour maurice Fanon" 1991
- "Mémoires d'A Nightclub: L'Écluse" of Marc Chevalier – Éditions La Découverte (1987)
