= Manam =

Manam may refer to:

- Manam (film), a 2014 Indian Telugu-language fantasy drama film written and directed by Vikram Kumar
- Manam language, a Kairiru–Manam language spoken mainly on the volcanic Manam Island, northeast of New Guinea
- Manam Motu, an island located in the Bismarck Sea
- Al-Manam, or The Dream (1987 film) in English, a 1987 Syrian documentary film by the director Mohammad Malas
