= Khlat =

Khlat may refer to:

- Yiddish for Khalat historically worn by Ashkenazi Jewish men in Eastern Europe
- Armenian spelling of Ahlat, Turkey
- Yasmine Khlat, Lebanese actress and writer
- Hector Khlat (1888-1977), Lebanese poet
