= Abdellatif Ben Ammar =

Tunisian film director and screenwriter (1943–2023)

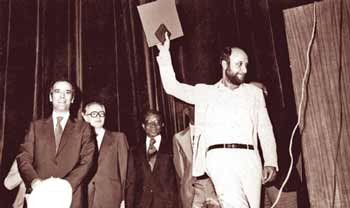
- Ben Ammar (right) in 1980
- Born: 25 April 1943; Tunis, French protectorate of Tunisia
- Died: 6 February 2023 (aged 79); Tunis, Tunisia
- Education: Lycée Alaoui; Institut des hautes études cinématographiques
- Occupations: Film director Screenwriter

Abdellatif Ben Ammar (Arabic: عبد اللطيف بن عمار; 25 April 1943 – 6 February 2023) was a Tunisian film director and screenwriter.

== Biography ==
Born in Tunis on 25 April 1943, Ben Ammar studied mathematics at the Lycée Alaoui. He then turned to cinema and earned a diploma in filmmaking from the Institut des hautes études cinématographiques in Paris in 1965.

Upon his return to Tunisia, Ben Ammar was hired by the Tunisian Company for Cinematic Production and Expansion and began shooting short films and assisting Tunisian and foreign directors. In 1970, he released his first feature film, A Simple Story, then founded the film studio Latif Productions alongside Abdellatif Layouni. He also founded a post-production company, Ben Duran.

Ben Ammar died in Tunis on 6 February 2023, at the age of 79.

== Filmography ==
- 2 + 2 = 5 (1966)
- Le Cerveau (1967)
- Opération yeux (1967)
- L'Espérance (1968)
- A Simple Story (1970)
- Sur les traces de Baal (1971)
- Mosquées de Kairouan (1972)
- Sejnane (1973)
- Sadiki (1975)
- Kairouan, la Grande Mosquée (1979)
- Aziza (1980)
- Le Chant de la noria (2002)
- Farhat Hached (2002)
- Khota Fawka Assahab (2003)
- Les Palmiers blessés (2010)

== Distinctions ==
- Tanit de bronze at the Carthage Film Festival for A Simple Story (1970)
- Tanit de bronze at the Carthage Film Festival for Sejnane (1974)
- Special jury prize of the Panafrican Film and Television Festival of Ouagadougou for Sejnane (1976)
- Tanit d'or at the Carthage Film Festival for Aziza (1980)
- Selection for the Directors' Fortnight at the Cannes Film Festival for Aziza (1980)
