= Naceur Ktari =

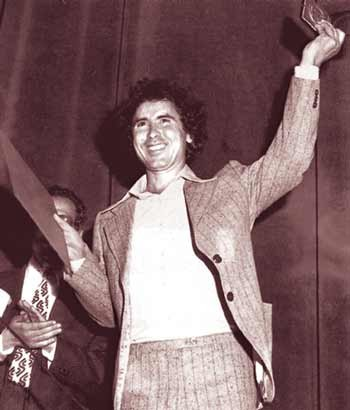
- Naceur Ktari in 1976
- Born: 17 May 1943 (age 82); Sayada, Tunisia
- Education: Paris

Naceur Ktari (born 1943) is a filmmaker from Tunisia.

== Early life and education ==
Ktari was born in Sayada in Tunisia on 17 May 1943. Ktari studied film in Paris and later in Rome. He worked as an assistant on Raiders of the Lost Ark when Steven Spielberg was filming in Tunisia in 1981.

== Career ==
His first film which was partly funded in Libya was called The Ambassadors (Les Ambassadeurs}. This film won the Tanit d'or award in 1976 at the Carthage Film Festival.

Ktari's second feature film was not made until 2000. The film was titled Sweet and Bitter when distributed in English but was originally titled Be My Friend in French. The film gained the Tanit d'or bronze award.
