= Ribat of Lamta =

Fort in Tunisia

Coordinates: 35.676111°N 10.881944°E

Ribat of Lamta رباط لمطة
- Lamta, Tunisia
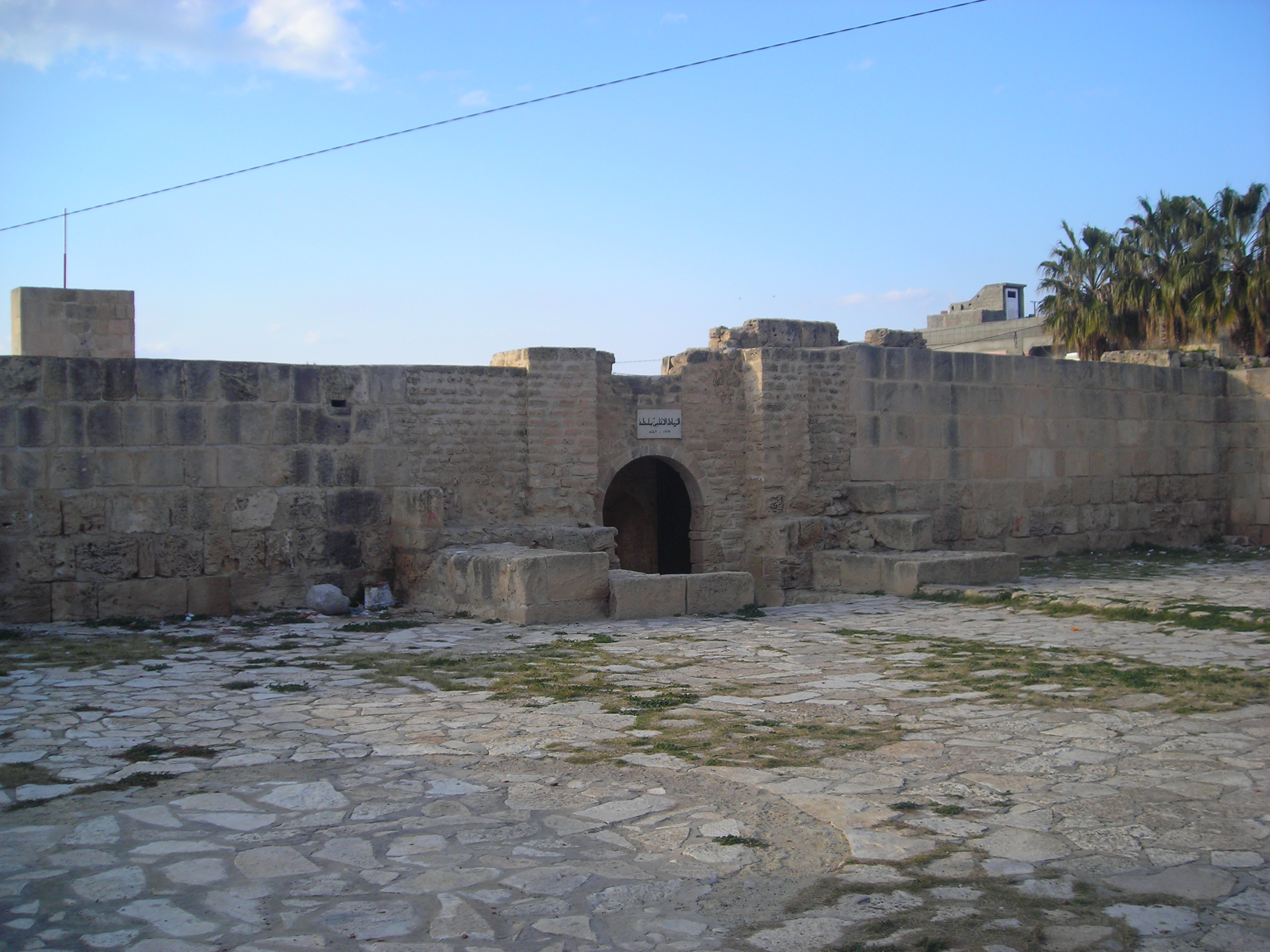
- View from outside

Site information
- Type: Aghlabid Ribat

Site history
- Built: 9th century
- Built by: Abu Ibrahim Ahmad ibn Muhammad
- Materials: stone

Ribat of Lamta رباط لمطة is a small Aghlabid ribat in the coastal town of Lamta, Tunisia. The building was constructed in 859 (corresponding to 245 AH) by the Aghlabid prince Abu Ibrahim Ahmad ibn Muhammad.

== Description and history ==
It consists of a square, single-storey building with rounded towers at the corners. The entrance to the ribat is via a single main entrance that opens onto a straight corridor leading to a central courtyard, where travelers could seek refuge to rest. The central courtyard, which features an underground water reservoir, is surrounded by several small rooms.

Many soldier-monks stayed in the ribat, including:

- Abu al-Sari Wassel al-Jami (Arabic: أبو السري واصل الجمي);
- Abu Bakr al-Qurashi al-Saqili (Arabic: أبو بكر القرشي الصقلي), one of Yahya Ibn Omar's companions;
- Abu Haroun al-Andalusi (Arabic: أبو هارون الأندلسي), died in 903 (291 A.H.) in Lamta.

== Protection and classification ==
On 21 January 2021, an order from the Ministry of Culture made it a protected monument identified by ID 52–8.

== Gallery ==
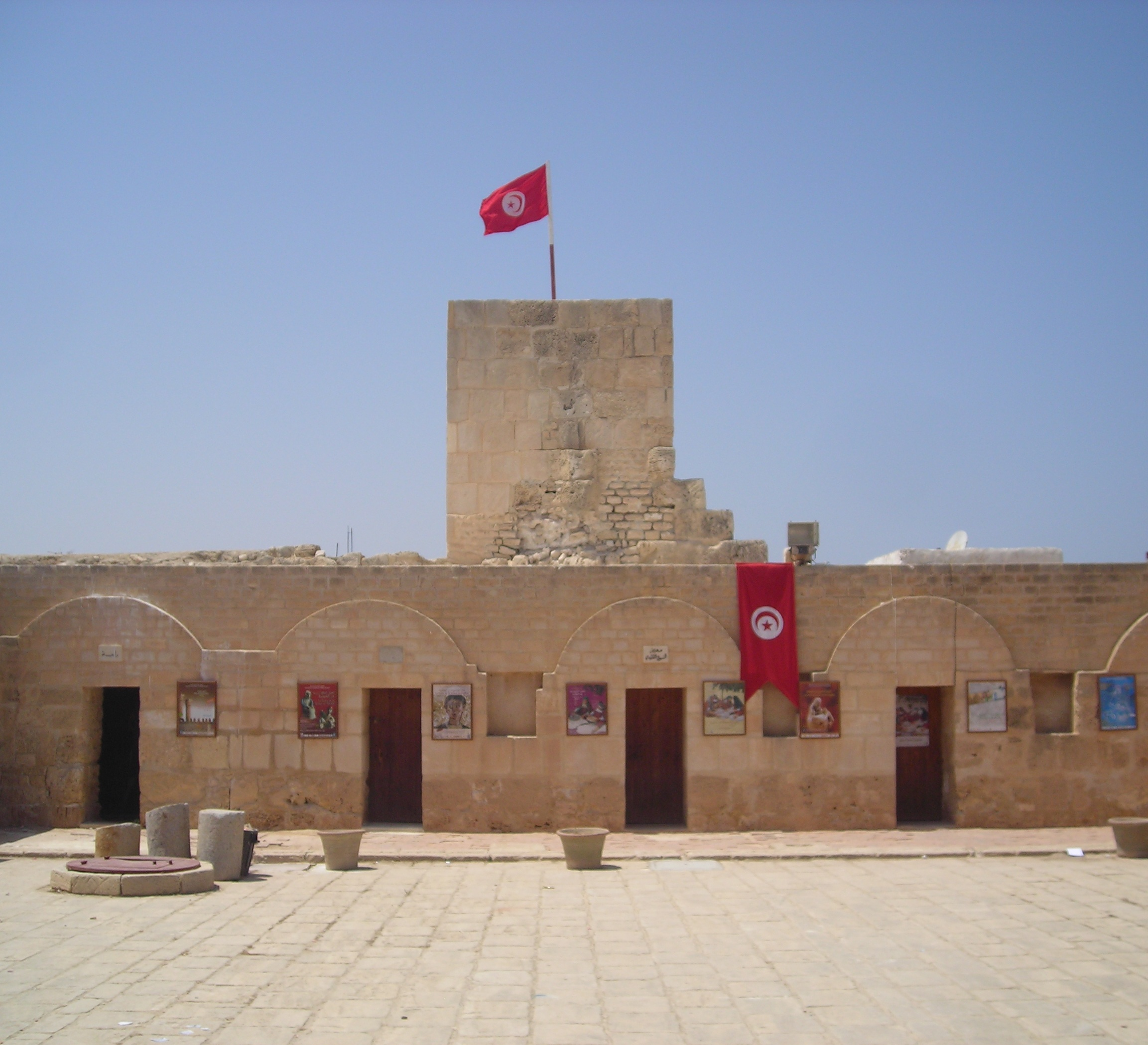
Interior of the ribat

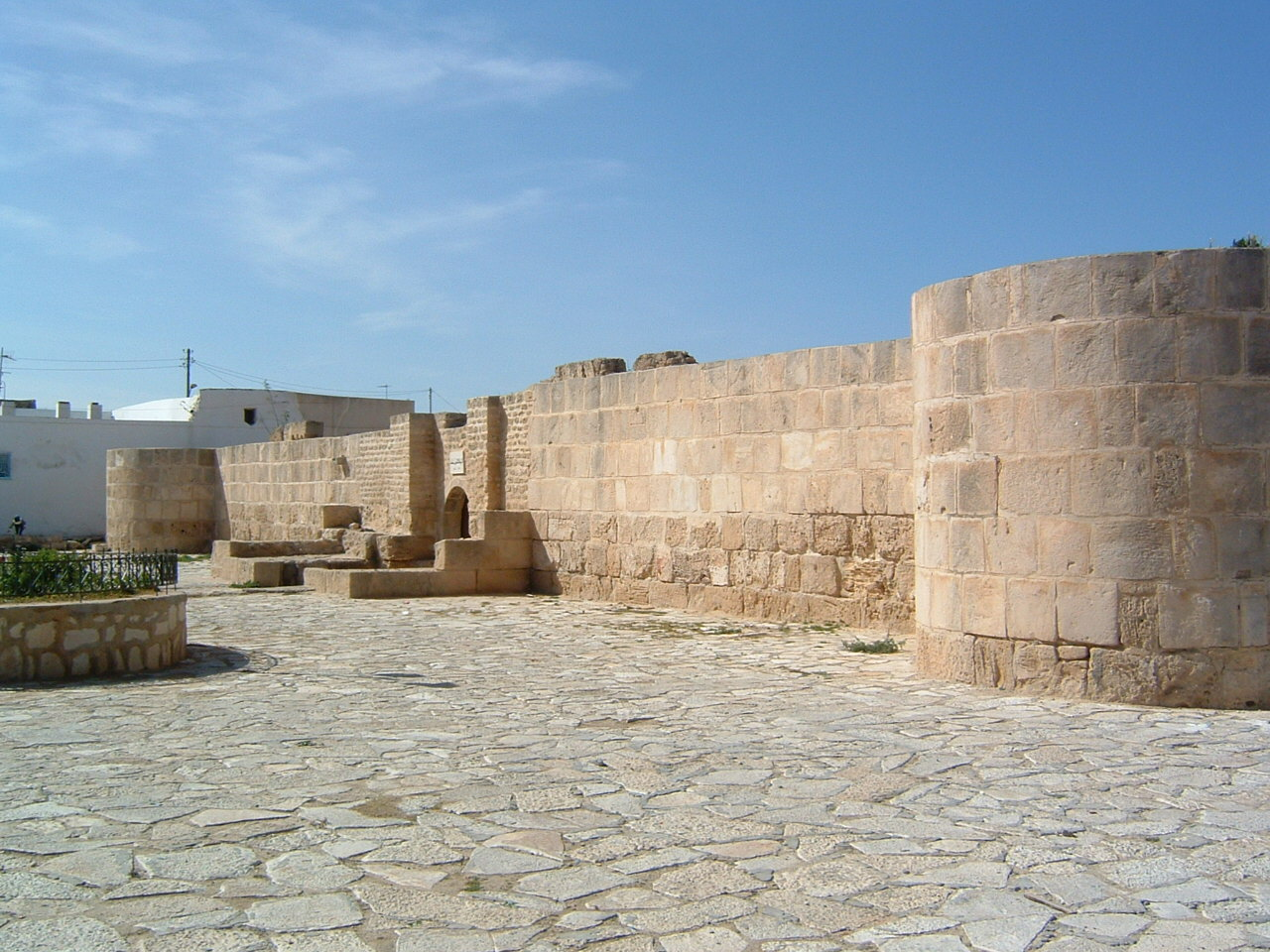
Exterior of the ribat

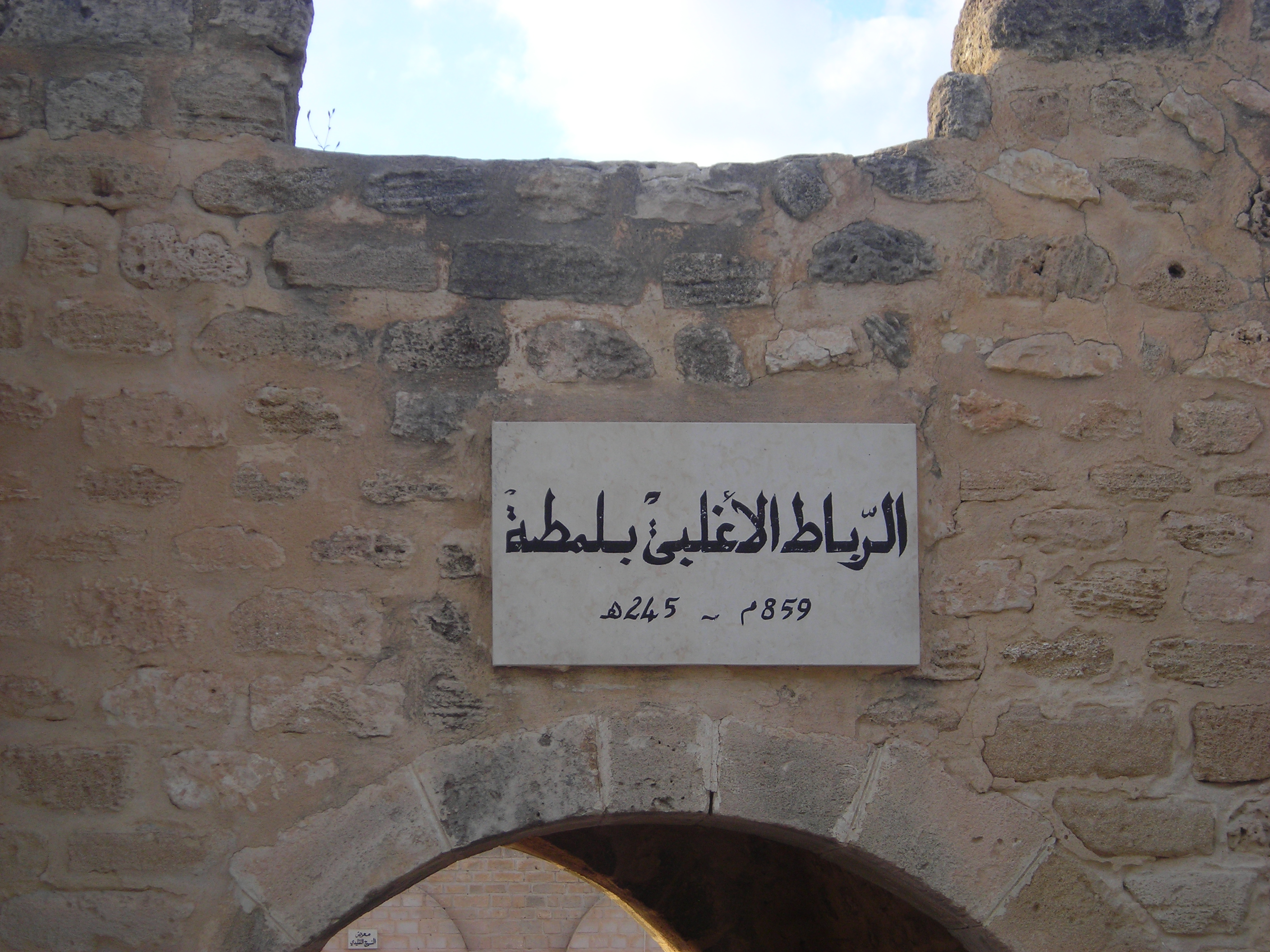
Plaque at the entrance

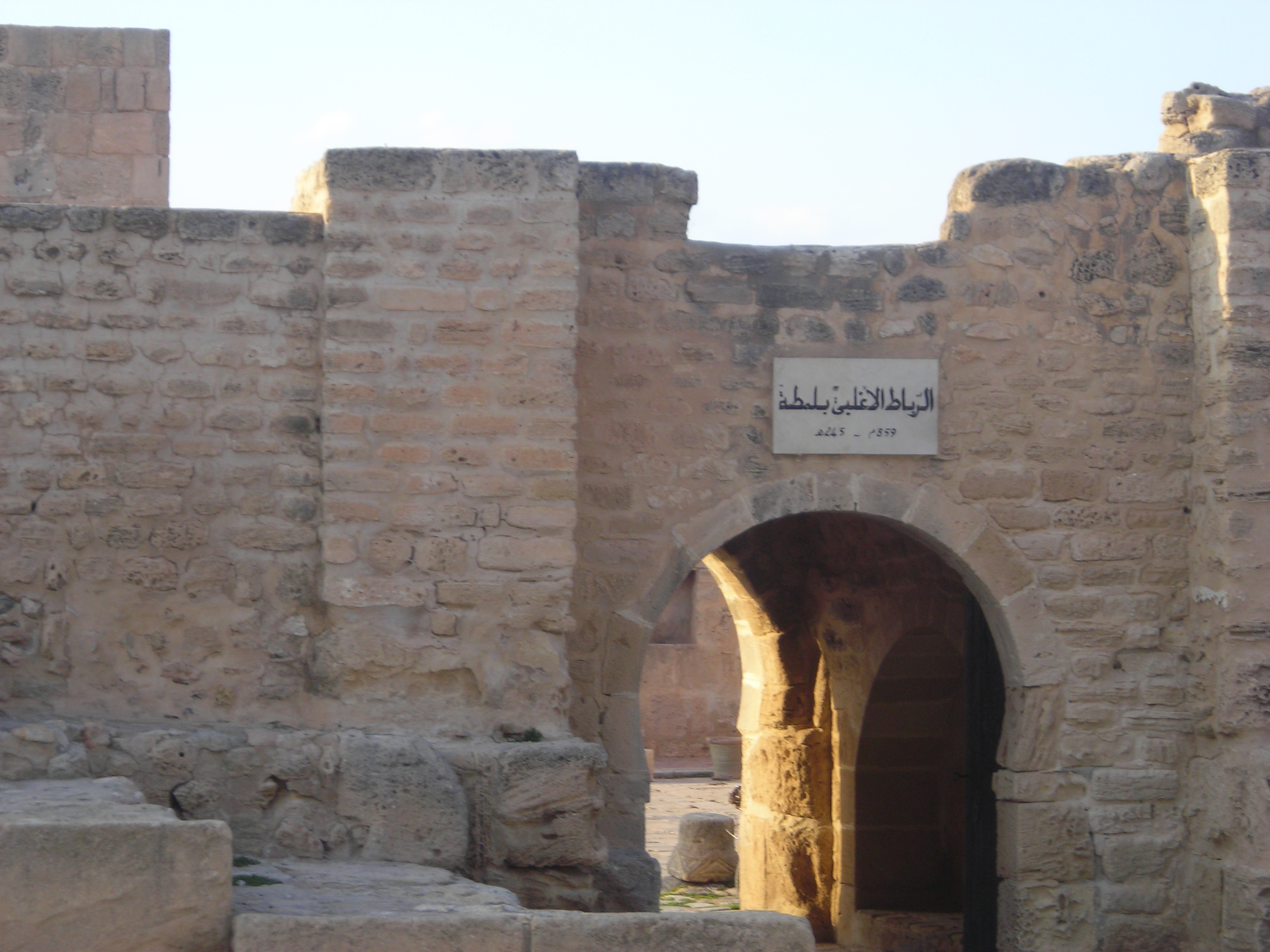
Main Entrance of the ribat

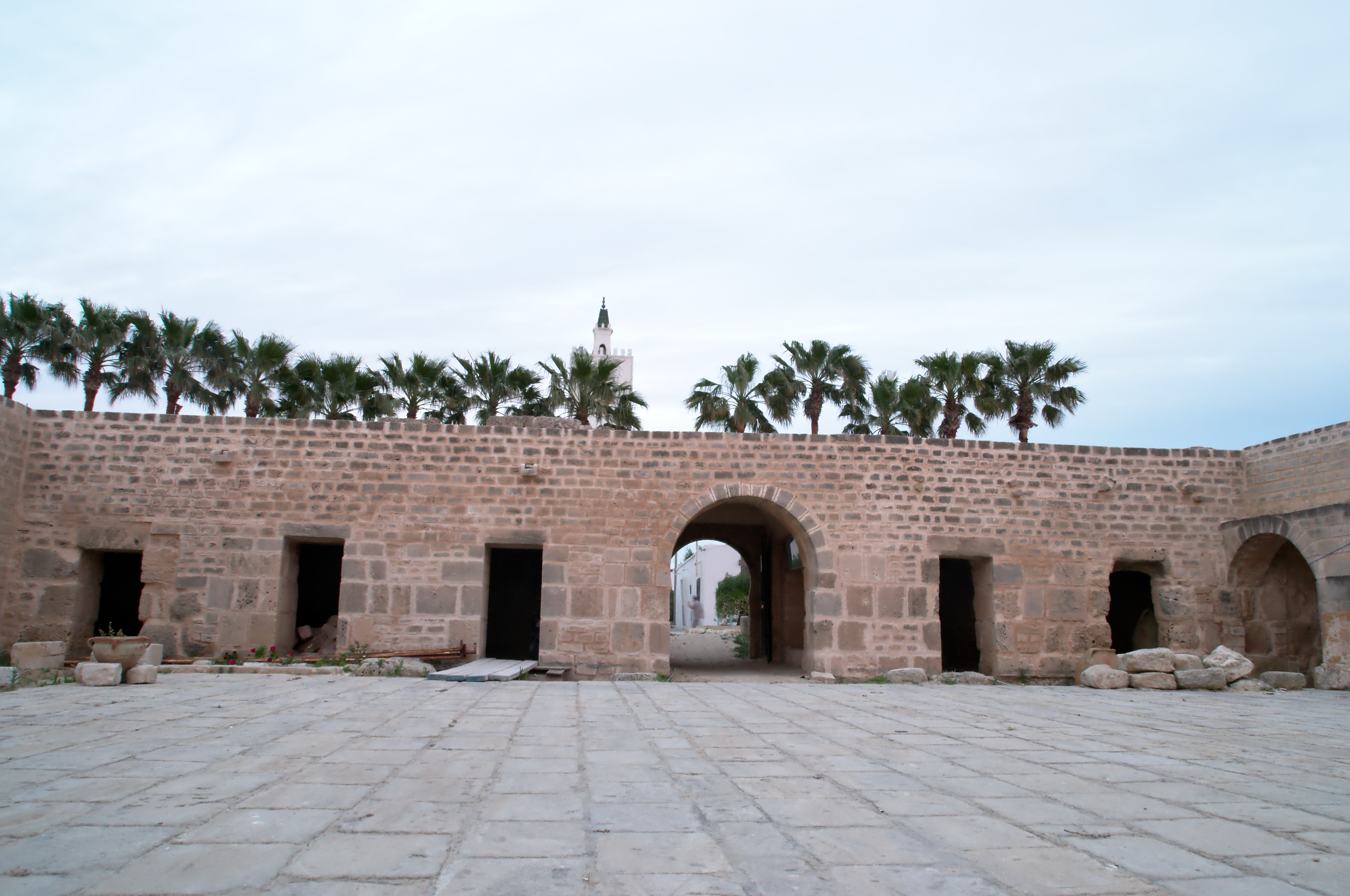
Ribat's courtyard
