= Wedding in Galilee =

1987 film by Michel Khleifi

- Directed by: Michel Khleifi
- Written by: Michel Khleifi
- Produced by: Michel Khleifi, Bernard Lorain, Jacqueline Louis
- Cinematography: Walther Vanden Ende
- Edited by: Marie Castro-Vasquez
- Music by: Jean-Marie Sénia
- Release date: 1987
- Running time: 100 minutes (Israel); 113 minutes (U.S.)
- Countries: France, Belgium
- Languages: Arabic, Hebrew, Turkish

Wedding in Galilee (Arabic: عرس الجليل, romanized: Urs al-Jalil) is a 1987 film directed by Michel Khleifi. It marks the first feature film made in Palestine by a Palestinian director and was awarded the International Critics Prize at Cannes in 1987. Produced during an era when there were scarce cinematic depictions of Palestinian existence, Wedding in Galilee revolves around the marriage ceremony of a young couple in a Palestinian village situated in Galilee, northern Israel.

== Plot ==
The film takes place in a Galilean Palestinian village following the 1948 Arab-Israeli War. The village muktar, Abu Adel, wants to celebrate his son Adel's wedding with a traditional and elaborate ceremony. However, this is inhibited by a curfew imposed on the town by the Israeli military authorities. Abu Adel must ask the Israeli military governor for permission to celebrate his son Adel's marriage past night fall. The governor grants the muktar's request on the condition that he and his staff attend the ceremonies.

The muktar's family is divided on the Israeli governor's attendance, and some members plot to sabotage the party. The film spans two days of mounting tension, which culminates in the groom's failure to consummate his marriage. Blaming his father for the indignity of the wedding, Adel attempts to stab the muktar, but is prevented by his newlywed bride. Ultimately, the bride Samia takes her own virginity so that the stained wedding sheets can be displayed, bringing the ceremony to an end.

== Cast ==
- Mohamad Ali El Akili as Mukhtar
- Bushra Karaman as Mother
- Makram Khoury as The Governor
- Yussuf Abu-Warda as Bacem (credited as Youssef Abou Warda)
- Anna Condo (born Achdian) as Bride
- Nazih Akleh as Groom
- Sonia Amar as Soumaya
- Eyad Anis as Hassan
- Waël Barghouti as Ziad
- Juliano Mer as Officer
- Ian Chemi as Officer 2
- Tali Dorat as Soldier

== Commentary ==
Writing for the Middle East Research and Information Project, Ella Shohat stated that Khleifi's film "largely transcends traditional mass-media discourse which would reduce the Israeli–Palestinian conflict to 'peace-loving Israelis' versus 'violence-prone Arabs'". Shohat added that "Unlike Kafr Qasim, the 1973 film by the Lebanese director Borhane Alawiyye, Wedding in Galilee does not reduce the oppression of the Palestinian people to a Manichaean schema of good Palestinians versus evil Israelis. As in Gillo Pontecorvo’s Battle of Algiers (1966), Khleifi portrays the individual members of the military as normal, even sympathetic, preferring to emphasize the oppressive policies themselves rather than the moral malignancy of the executioners." Shohat similarly contrasts the Zionist narrative of "making the desert bloom" with Khleifi's association of "earth, crops, trees, vegetation and abundance of food with the Palestinians" but Israel's "dispossession of land by violence" and the use of landmines in Palestinian fields.

Shohat also contrasts Khleifi's vision of a Palestinian liberatory feminism with Israeli feminist discourse, "which views women soldiers as liberated women but fails to see the irony of a liberation linked to military oppression", suggesting that Israelis "have to denude themselves of their soldierly masculinity in order to live in harmony with the Arabs", quoting the groom's sister who tells a soldier "you will have to take off your uniform if you want to dance"; Karen Orton writing for Another Magazine likewise describes how characters outside of typical masculine society "play a vital role binding the community together as well as reminding a new generation of their past and possibilities for the future in these long fought over hills".

Shohat also describes how Khleifi "confounds accuracy of time and place in order to sustain the idea of a Palestinian nation", by blurring Muslim and Christian customs in the wedding (noting that Khleifi was a member of the Palestinian Christian minority, "perceived in a 'better light'" by Israelis); by depicting anachronistic martial law within the Israeli Green Line to convey "a national oppression that is inseparable from that of the Palestinians on the West Bank and in Gaza"; and filming in 3 villages near Nazareth in Galilee (within the Green Line) and 2 villages in the West Bank (territories occupied since 1967), all of which contribute to an "emphasis on a single national [Palestinian] identity" but "elides significant differences in the representation of the Palestinian struggle" while the narrative structure emphasises the perspective that Israelis are an occupying power, "one more foreign power coming in the wake of the Turks and British".

In an interview at the 2015 Shubbak Festival, where Khleifi had been asked to curate a film programme looking at European representation of Palestinians and of feminist struggle, he described the film as being a work "with many voices [bringing] the archaic, traditional world and the modern world into confrontation ... confrontation between generations, confrontation between men and women's spaces, and confrontation between the individual and the collective. All of this takes place in a colonial situation, under Israeli domination."

== Awards ==
- International Critics Prize, Cannes 1987
- Golden Shell at San Sebastián International Film Festival, 1987
- André Cavens Award by the Belgian Film Critics Association, 1987
- Tanit d'or at Carthage Film Festival, 1988
- Humanum Prize by the Belgian Film Critics Association
- Joseph Plateau Awards 1988
  - Best Belgian Film at Film Fest Gent
  - Best Benelux Film at Film Fest Gent
