= Les Ambassadeurs (film) =

1977 Tunisian film directed by Naceur Ktari

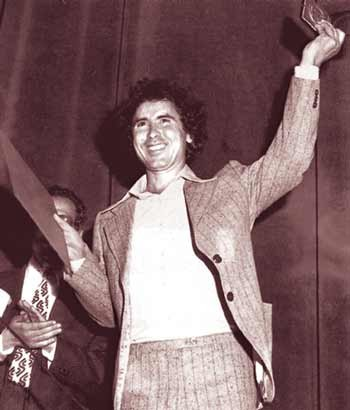
- Naceur Ktari
- Directed by: Naceur Ktari
- Written by: Naceur Ktari; Lise Bouzidi; Christine Jancovici; Ahmed Kassem; Gérard Mauger
- Produced by: Alain Dahan, Unité Trois (France); Hassen Daldoul, SATPEC (Tunisia); OGEK (Libya)
- Starring: Sidi Ali Kouiret; Jacques Rispal; Tahar Kebaïli; Amal Ayouch; Marcel Cuvelier
- Cinematography: Jean-Jacques Rochut
- Edited by: François Ceppi; Larbi Ben Ali
- Music by: Hamadi Ben Othman
- Release dates: 27 April 1977 (France); 15 September 1977 (Canada)
- Running time: 102 minutes
- Countries: Tunisia; France; Libya
- Language: French

Les Ambassadeurs (Tunisian Arabic: السفراء, English: The Ambassadors) is a Tunisian film produced in 1975 by Naceur Ktari. It won the Tanit d'or for best film at Carthage Film Festival in 1976 and the special jury prize at Locarno International Film Festival the same year. It was selected for the 1978 Cannes Film Festival in the category "Un Certain Regard".

== Synopsis ==
In the Goutte d'Or neighborhood of Paris, North African immigrants share a tiny apartment amongst their French neighbors. The two communities get along uneasily, their relationship rife with misunderstandings and mutual offense. Salah (Sidi Ali Kouiret), from the southern Maghreb, is a witness to this immigrant life in Paris and to the day to day incidents which make up the life of his compatriots. They, excepting those willing to pursue a life of petty crime, live a life of tedium and depression. French racists in the area escalate tensions with a series of attacks that end in a double murder. Salah, with the help of his friends, decides to organise protests against the injustice they face.

== Acting credits ==
- Sidi Ali Kouiret as Salah
- Jacques Rispal as Albert
- Tahar Kebaïli as Mehdi
- Marcel Cuvelier as Pierre
- Mohamed Hamam as Ahmed
- Dominique Lacarriere as Zohra
- Faouzi Kasri as Ali
- Pierre Forget as Cecelle
- Dynn Yaad as Kamel
- Françoise Thuries as Teacher
- Med Hondo as Med
- Catherine Rivet as Catherine
- Didane Oumer as Hedi
- François Dyrek as Paul
- Raoul Curet as Teacher
- Gilberte Géniat as Baker
- Guy Mairesse as Le guetteur
- Khémaïs Khayati as Aziz
- Paul Pavel as Journalist
- Denise Peron as Denise
- Alice Reichen as Instructor
- Yves Wecker as Nicolas
- Jenny Clève as Simone
- Annie Noel as Josette
- Omar Chouiref
- Berabah Rabah
- Abdellatif Hamrouni
- Samir Ayedi

== Production credits ==
- Script : Lise Bouzidi, Christine Jancovici, Ahmed Kassem, Naceur Ktari et Gérard Mauger
- Director : Naceur Ktari
- Editing : François Ceppi et Larbi Ben Ali
- Music : Hamadi Ben Othman
- Photography : Jean-Jacques Rochut
- Scenery : Denis Martin Sisteron
- Sound : Antoine Bonfanti, Auguste Galli et Hechmi Joulak
- Format : colour (35 mm)

== Producers ==
- Unité Trois : Alain Dahan (France)
- SATPEC : Hassen Daldoul (Tunisia)
- OGEK (Libya)

== Recognition ==
- Tanit d'or for best film Journées cinématographiques de Carthage (1976)
- Prix spécial du jury du Festival international du film de Locarno (1976)
- Sélectionné au Festival de Cannes pour "Un certain Regard" (1978)
