= Passion (2005 film) =

- Directed by: Mohamed Malas
- Written by: Ahmed Attia; Mohamed Malas
- Produced by: Ahmed Attia; Fabienne Servan-Schreiber
- Starring: Salwa Jamil; Naceur Ouerdiani; Oussama Sayed Youssef; Mahmoud Hamed; Houda Rokbi
- Cinematography: Tarek Ben Abdallah
- Edited by: Kahéna Attia
- Music by: Marcel Khalife
- Distributed by: General Organization for Cinema
- Release date: August 10, 2005 (France)
- Running time: 98 minutes
- Country: Syria
- Language: Arabic

Passion or Bab al-Makam (Arabic: باب المقام) is a Syrian feature drama film by director Mohamed Malas.

== Awards ==
- Marrakech International Film Festival - Special Jury Award, 2005.
