= Rachid Ammar =

Tunisian general

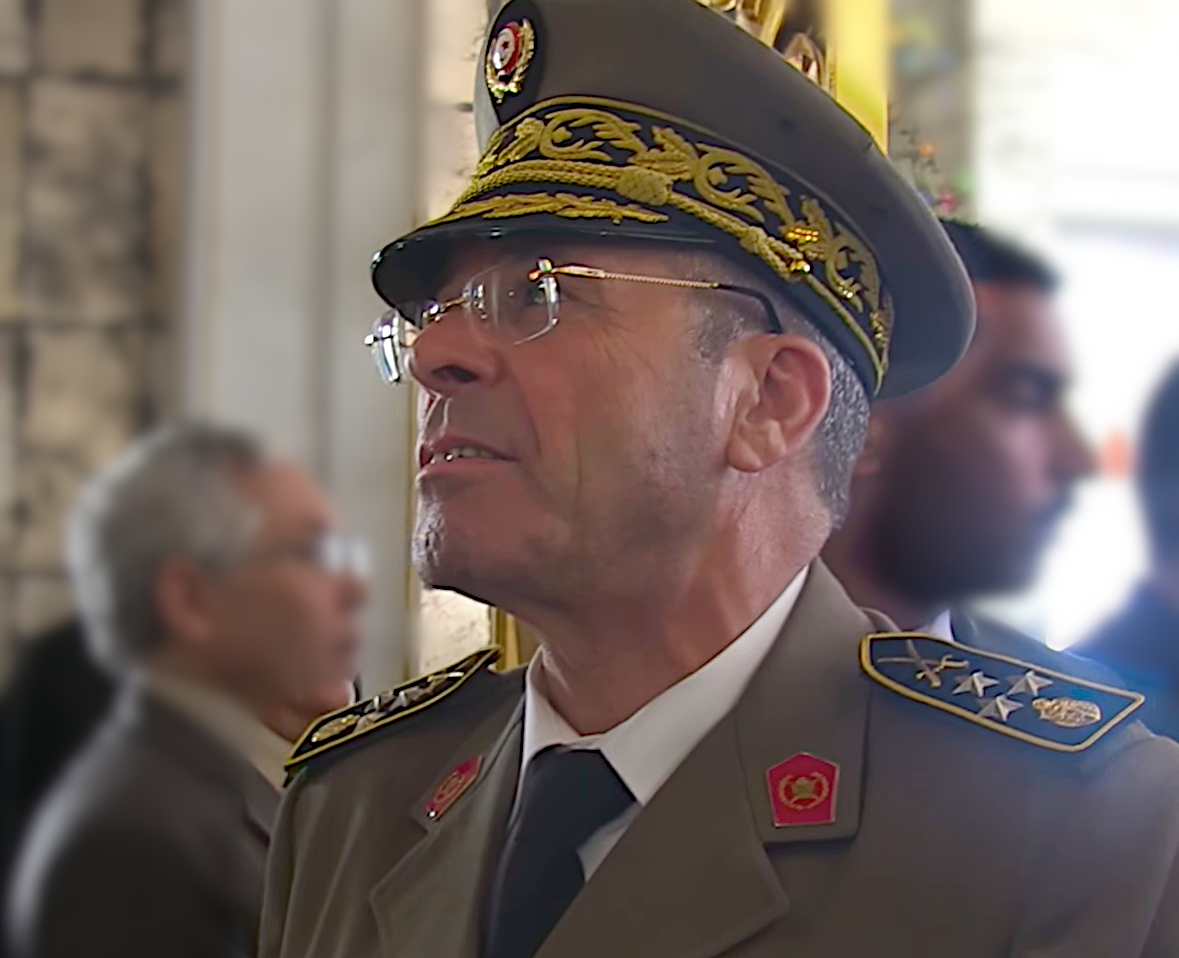
- in 2013
- Born: 1947 or 1948; Sayada, Tunisia

Rachid Ammar, or Rchid Ammar (Arabic: رشيد عمار) (born 1947 or 1948) was the chief of staff of the Tunisian Armed Forces.

He is perhaps best known for his refusal to fire on protestors during the 2011 Tunisian Revolution. He has been described as "the first post-2011 icon in Tunisia."

== Biography ==
Born in either 1947 or 1948, Ammar is from Sayada, a small town on the coast of Tunisia.

Ammar was promoted to chief of staff from the rank of colonel when the previous chief of staff, Abdelaziz Skik, was killed in a 2002 helicopter crash, considered mysterious by several soldiers and journalists who have also held Ben Ali's government responsible. The same helicopter crash also killed five colonels, four majors, and two lieutenants, and one casualty was the Military Security Service leader colonel El Arbi Ghazali.

Ammar was a member of the joint chiefs of staff and was received along with other members of the council by Ali at a ceremony during the summer of 2010. There, Ammar was promoted by Ben Ali from the rank of divisional general to that of corps general.

On 25 June 2013, Ammar announced his retirement due to harsh criticisms.

== Tunisian revolution ==
On 13 January 2011, Ammar refused to follow the orders of Zine El Abidine Ben Ali, then president of Tunisia, to shoot protesters participating in the 2010–2011 Tunisian protests. He responded to the Presidential order with, "Agree to deploy soldiers to calm the situation, but the army does not shoot the people." His popularity increased thereafter, and he has been described as having "real political clout" as a result in the post-revolution era.

Ben Ali then sacked Ammar for not obeying his order and put him under house arrest. On 14 January, Ben Ali fled Tunisia and Ammar was reinstated by Mohamed Ghannouchi. On 15 January, The Economist reported that the Tunisian military was being led by Ammar. The New York Times reported there was speculation that Ammar would take over the country and become president. The Egyptian newspaper Almasry Alyoum reported that the embassy of the United States had told Ammar to take control of Tunisia if the country became politically unstable.
