= Lamta Archaeological Museum =

Coordinates: 35°40′37″N 10°52′38″E

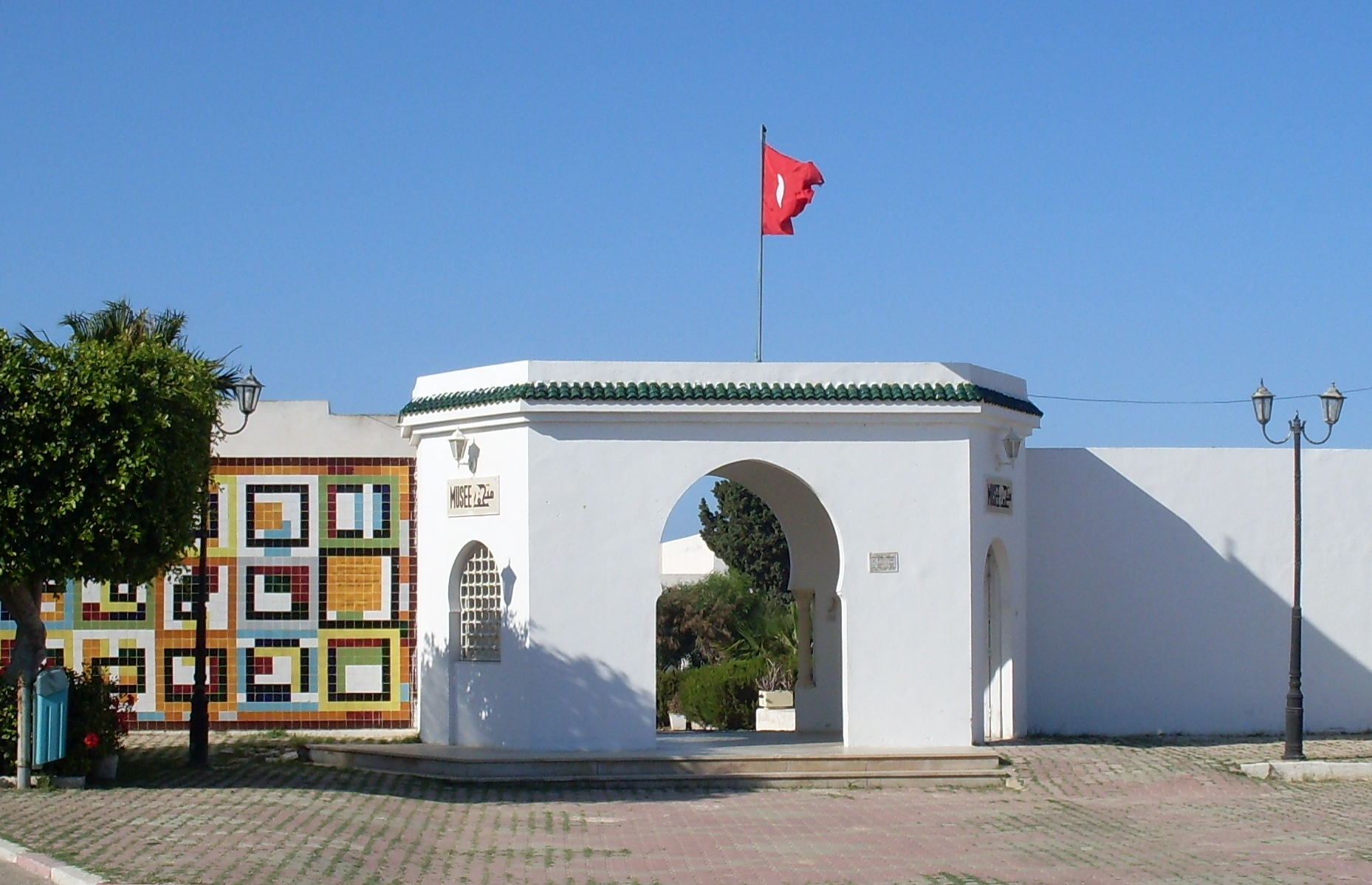
- Exterior of museum in 2010
- Location: Lamta, Tunisia
- Type: Archaeological museum

The Lamta Archaeological Museum is an archaeological museum located in Lamta, Tunisia.

== Description ==
The purpose of the museum, inaugurated in 1992, is to host the abundant antiquity collections found in the region and explain the history of the area, starting from the arrival of Phoenician sailors in the settlement to the Roman period and early Christian era.

The museum is located on the seashore, on the north-eastern corner of the antique town of Leptiminus (also named Leptis Parva), which repeatedly played a key role, both during the Punic era (for example during the Mercenary War, or in the Third Punic War, as the location where Hannibal returned to Africa), and in the Roman period (when it sided with Julius Caesar during his stand-off against Pompey entrentched in Hadrumetum - Sousse).

The garden around the museum shows in-situ portions of a Roman thermal complex (whose remains extend beyond the museum boundaries), with floors covered with mosaics and the hot room (caldarium) central heating system below the floor (hypocaust) clearly visible and various sculptures.

The museu's modern building is built like some antique villas, with a rectangular building with a vaulted entranceway leading to three rooms opening onto an interior courtyard hosting a garden surrounded by a columned portico.

One room is dedicated to the Punic period, with poteries and a representative collection of the various finds in the necropolis surroundering the museum. In addition to a reconstitution of the most common urn burial set-up with a tube allowing the living to celebrate on the tomb memorial ceremonies and allowing them to pour libations into the tomb, the museum hosts a rare wooden sarcophagus from the Punic period (3rd century BCE).

A second room is dedicated to the Roman and early Christian period. A statue of the emperor Trajan (who promoted the town to the coveted statute of Roman colony between 98 and 117 CE) and some mosaics from the nearby archeological site of Uzita (a mosaic of the seasons, a mosaic of Venus "anadyomene", i.e. rising from the sea, surrounded by cupids) stand out among the various sculptures and honorary plaques of funerary inscriptions. The piece which particularly stands out is an exceptional sculpted Christian marble sarcophagus, where the deceased, portrayed in his rich landowning context - with a hunting party, his horse, his dog, servants and friends as well as his wife waiting for him at home - comes to the time of death, in front of Christ seated on the throne, surrounded by the apostles Peter and Paul, and transitions to the afterlife where his friends (with local names of non-Roman origin) have preceded him.

A third room was opened in 1994, in cooperation with Michigan University. Various types of amphorae discovered on site are displayed, and the exhibit explains how their study can provide data on trade flux in antiquity. Hydraulic systems and building techniques of the Roman period are also presented. The most precious pieces of the collection are several colorful Christian mosaics found in a nearby underground church (a basilica in a catacomb complex).

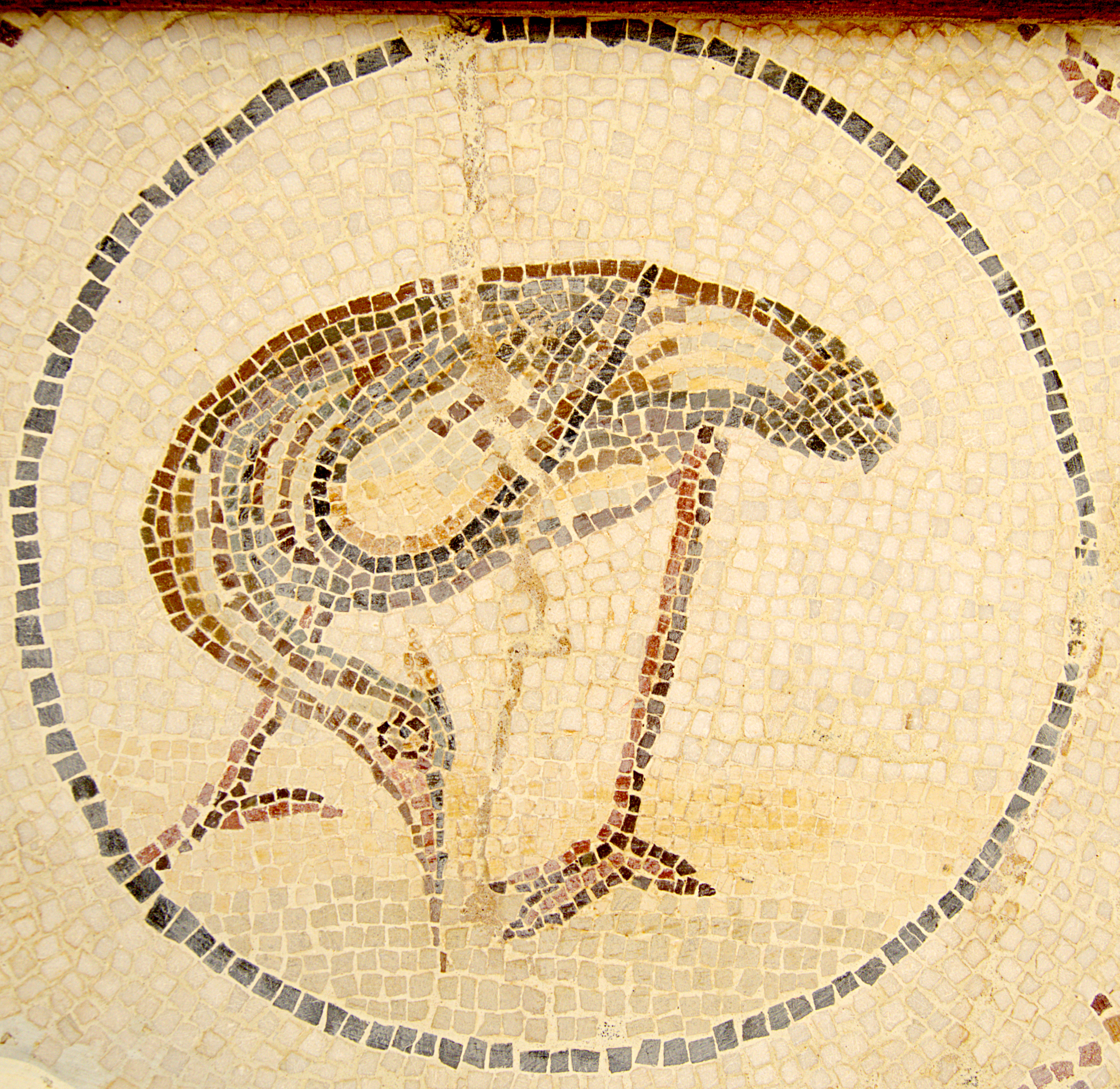
Roman mosaic, Lamta Museum

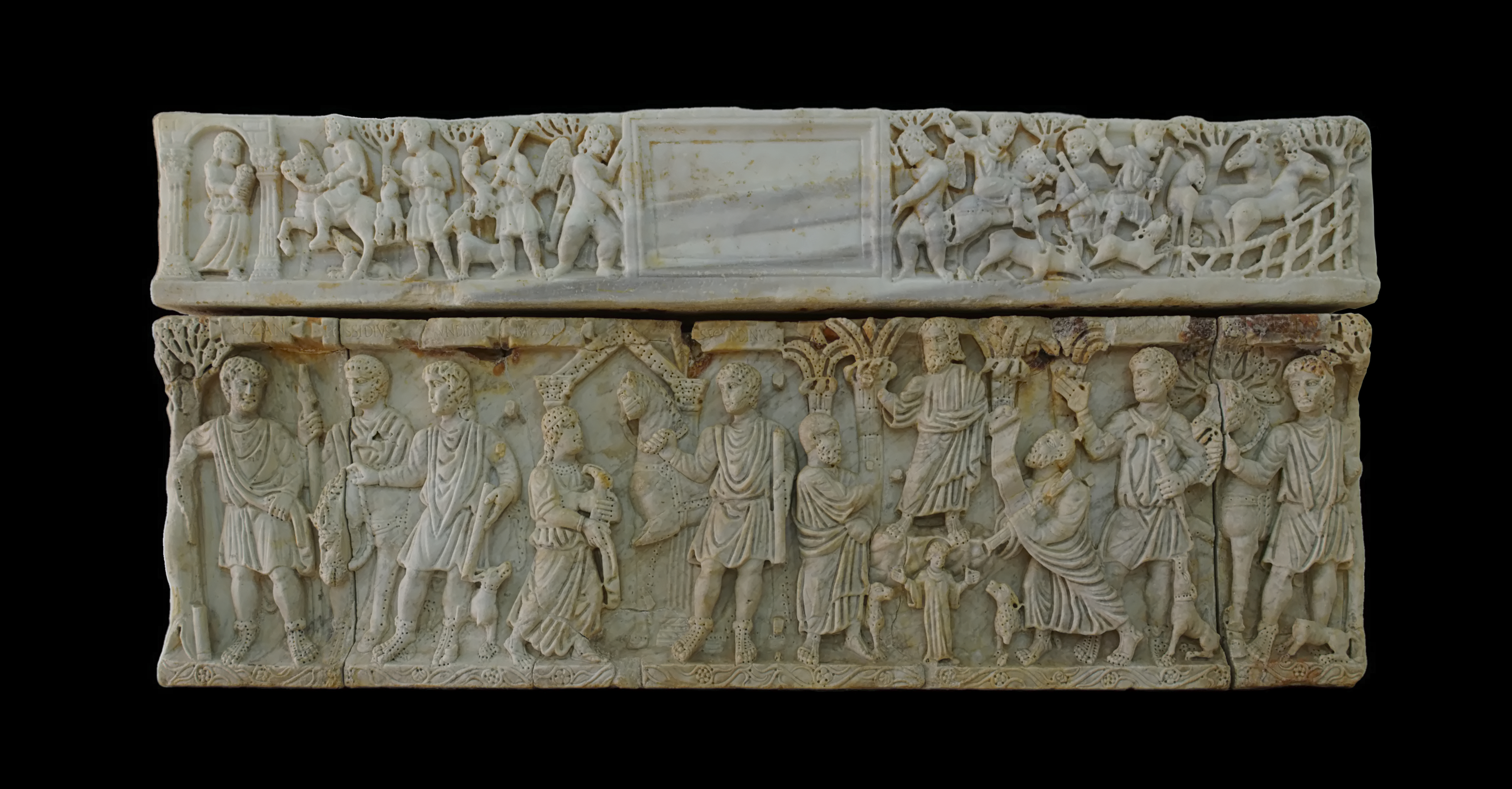
Christian sarcophagus discovered in Sayada, Lamta Archeological Museum

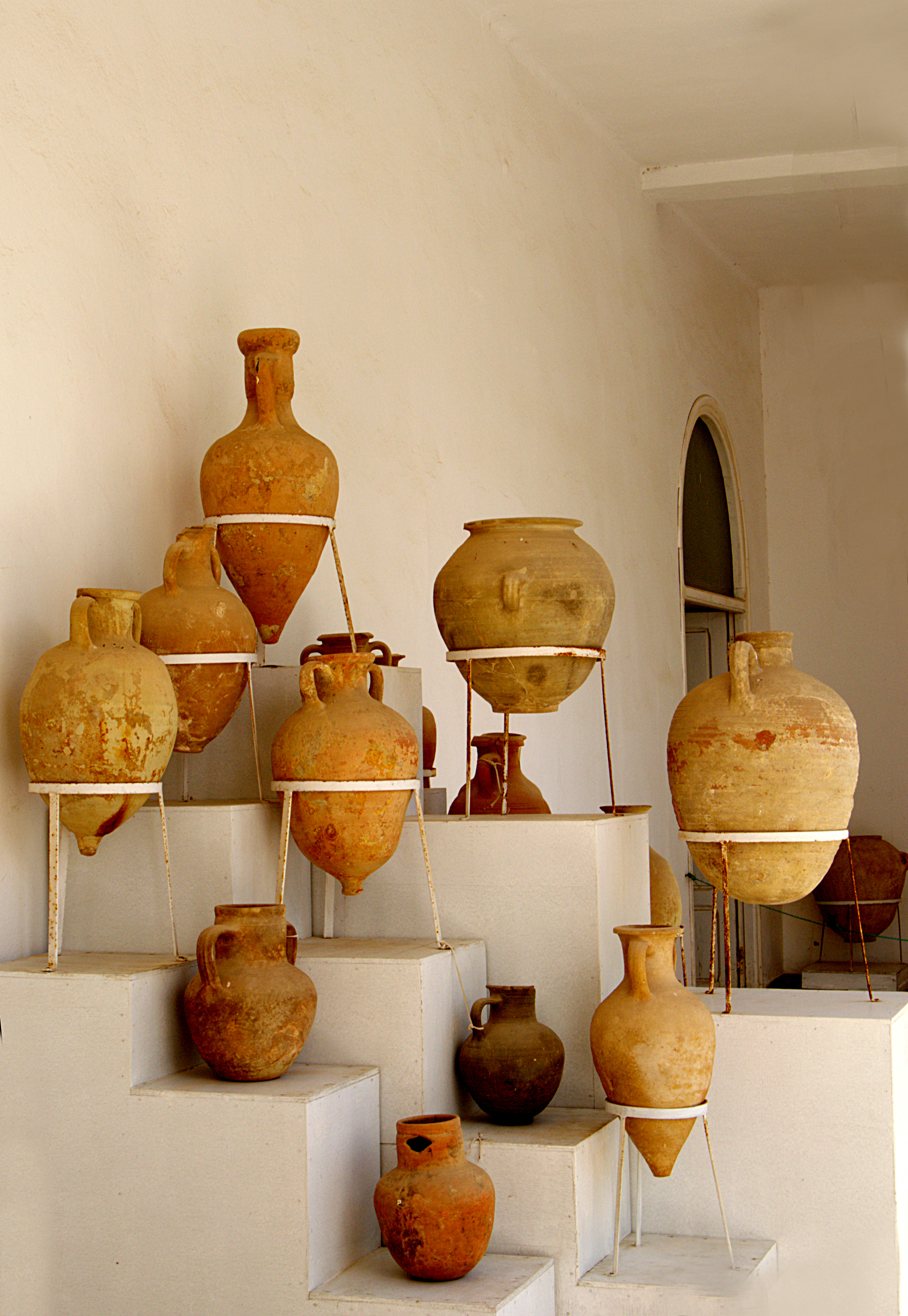
Amphorae in Lamta Museum (July 2013)

== See also ==
- African archaeology
- Carthage
- Culture of Tunisia
- List of museums in Tunisia
