= Tahar Cheriaa =

Tunisian film director and screenwriter

Tahar Cheriaa الطاهر شريعة
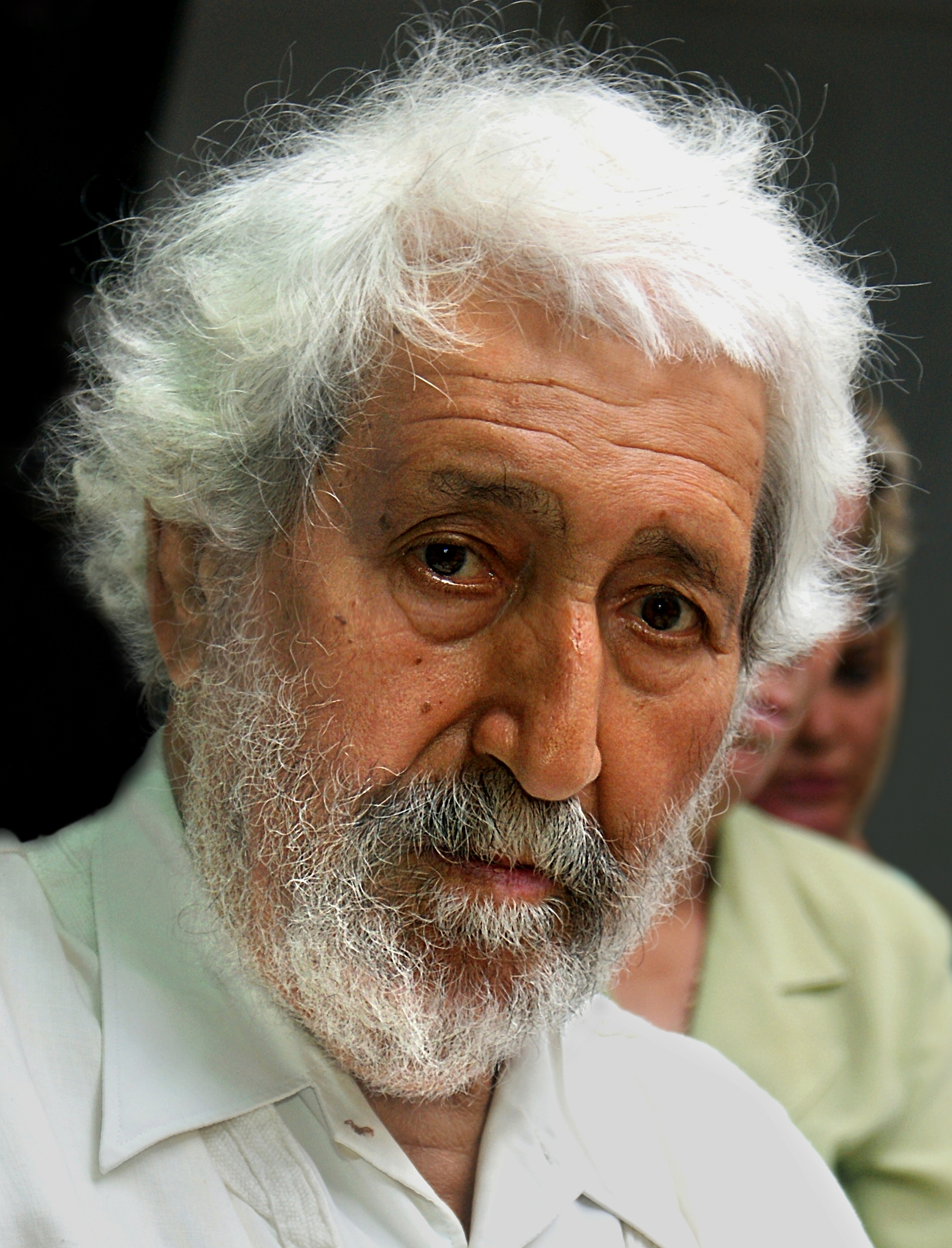
- Taher Cheriaa in 2008
- Born: January 5, 1927; Sayada, Tunisia
- Died: November 4, 2010 (aged 83); Ezzahra, Tunisia
- Citizenship: Tunisian
- Occupations: Film critic, Writer, translator
- Awards: Grand Cordon of National Merit

Tahar Cheriaa (Tunisian Arabic: الطاهر شريعة; January 5, 1927 – November 4, 2010) was a Tunisian film critic and the founder of the Carthage Film Festival in 1966, the first Panafrican and Panarab film festival.

== Biography ==
Cheriaa was born in Sayada in Tunisia. He was the founder of the Carthage Film Festival in 1966 and he led the first five events which were held every other year.

Cheria was involved in the translation of Arabic poetry and he was a writer and spokesperson for Arab-African film culture. He was awarded the Grand Cordon of National Merit.

Cheriaa died in Ezzahra in 2010. He is buried in his hometown of Sayada.
