= Amil Shivji =

Tanzanian filmmaker

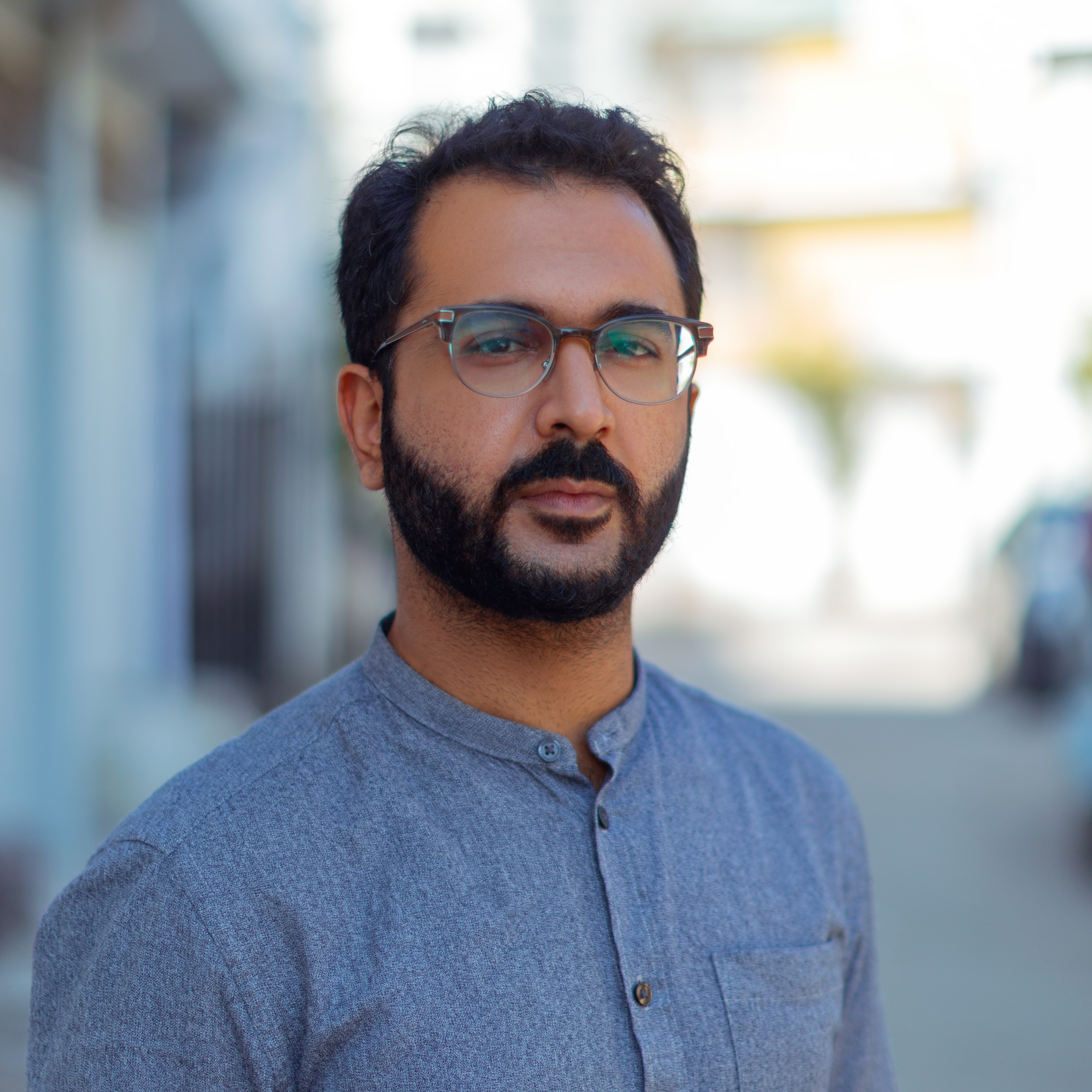
- Born: 1990 (age 35–36); Dar Es Salaam, Tanzania
- Citizenship: Tanzania
- Education: Master of Fine Arts (MFA), York University, Canada
- Occupation: Filmmaker
- Notable work: Tug of War (Vuta N'Kuvute) (2021); T-Junction (2017)
- Father: Issa Shivji
- Awards: Tanit d'or, Carthage Film Festival, 2022
- Website: www.kijiweniproductions.com

Amil Shivji (born 1990) is a Tanzanian filmmaker. His films generally tackle misrepresentations of Africa and its history, as well as the theme of neocolonialism.

== Biography and career ==
Born in Dar es Salaam, Shivji's roots can be traced back to Zanzibar. Often visiting as a child, he frequently draws inspiration from the island. Before launching his film career, Shivji worked as a journalist and radio host. He is the founder of Kijiweni Productions, a production company, and Kijiweni Cinema.

Shivji launched his career with two short fiction films, Shoeshine (2013) and Samaki Mchangani (2014). Both films participated in a number of international film festivals including the Rotterdam International Film Festival and the Panafrican Film and Television Festival of Ouagadougou (FESPACO) in Burkina Faso.

In 2015, he produced feature film Aisha, also screened internationally. The filmmaker's prize-winning feature directorial debut T-Junction (2017) opened the prestigious Zanzibar International Film Festival. In 2021, he released Vuta N’Kuvute (Tug of War), which premiered at the Toronto International Film Festival.

== Filmography ==
=== Short films ===
- 2012: Who Killed Me
- 2013: Shoeshine
- 2014: Samaki Mchangani

=== Feature films ===
- 2015: Aisha (as producer)
- 2017: T-Junction
- 2021: Vuta N’Kuvute (Tug of War)
