= Tug of War (2021 film) =

2021 Tanzanian film

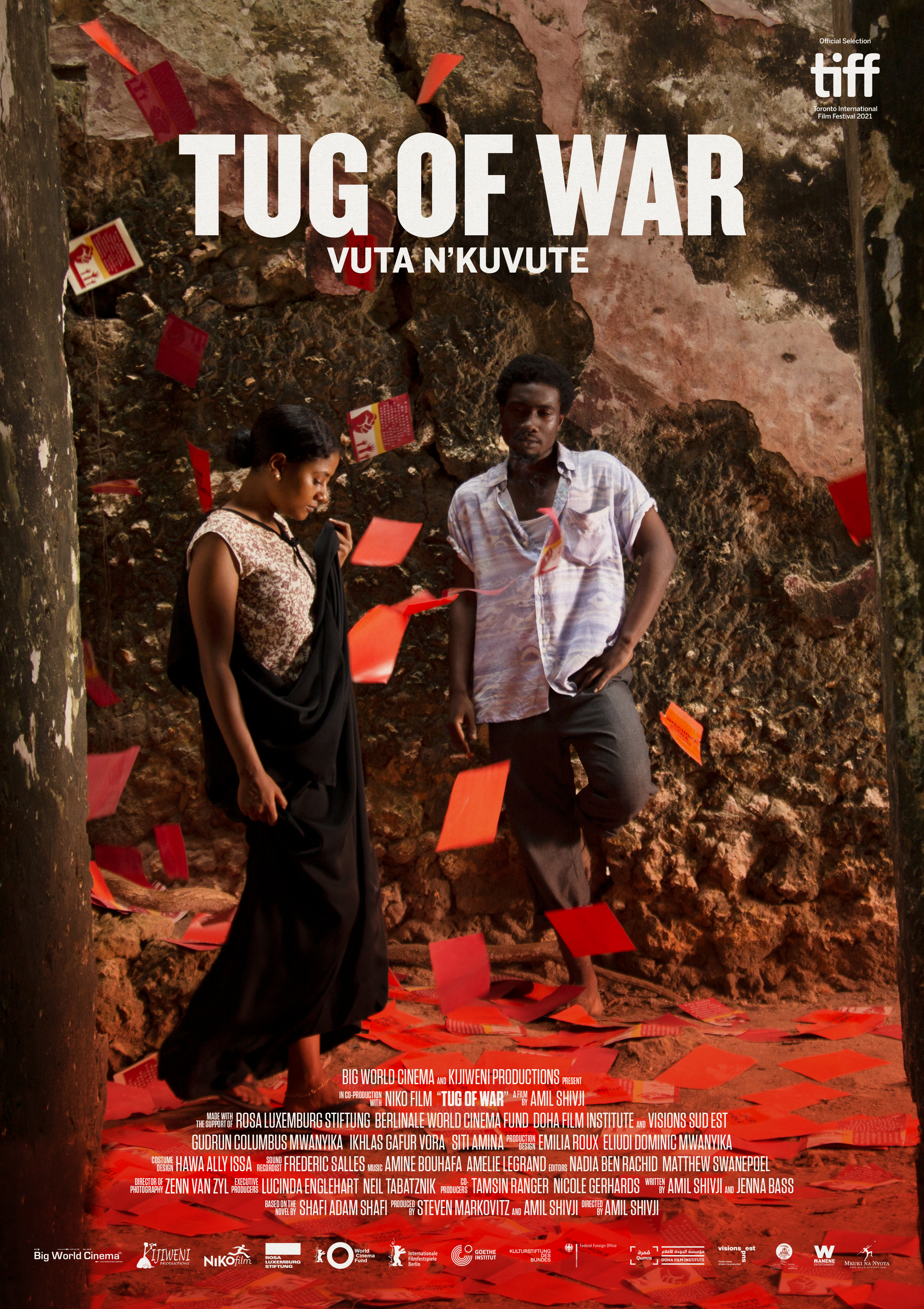
- Promotional release poster
- Vuta N'Kuvute
- Directed by: Amil Shivji
- Screenplay by: Amil Shivji; Jenna Cato Bass
- Based on: Vuta N'Kuvute by Shafi Adam Shafi
- Produced by: Steven Markovitz; Amil Shivji
- Starring: Gudrun Columbus Mwanyika; Siti Amina; Ikhlas Gafur Vora
- Cinematography: Zenn van Zyl
- Edited by: Nadia Ben Rachid; Matthew Swanepoel
- Music by: Amin Bouhafa; Amélie Legrand
- Production companies: Big World Cinema; Kijiweni Productions; NiKo Film
- Release date: 12 September 2021 (TIFF)
- Running time: 1hr 32m
- Country: Tanzania
- Language: Swahili

Tug of War (original title: Vuta N'Kuvute) is a 2021 Tanzanian coming-of-age political drama about love and resistance set in the final years of British colonial Zanzibar. The film was directed by Amil Shivji based on the award-winning novel of the same name by Adam Shafi. Tug of War is Tanzania's second entry ever, and its first in 21 years, for the Academy Award Best International Feature category. In November 2022, it was awarded the Tanit d'Or, the top prize at Tunisia's Carthage Film Festival.

== Plot ==
Taking place in 1950s Zanzibar, Tug of War is set during the movement to win independence for Zanzibar, then a British Protectorate. Denge, a young freedom fighter trained in the Soviet Union, distributes “Free Zanzibar” pamphlets and recruits people to the cause. One of his recruits is Yasmin, a run-away bride from a privileged, upper class Indian-Zanzibari family. She falls in love with Denge and becomes committed to the independence movement.

== Cast ==
Gudrun Columbus Mwayinka as Denge

Ikhlas Gafur Vora as Yasmin

Siti Amina as Mwajuma

Nick Reding as Inspector Wright

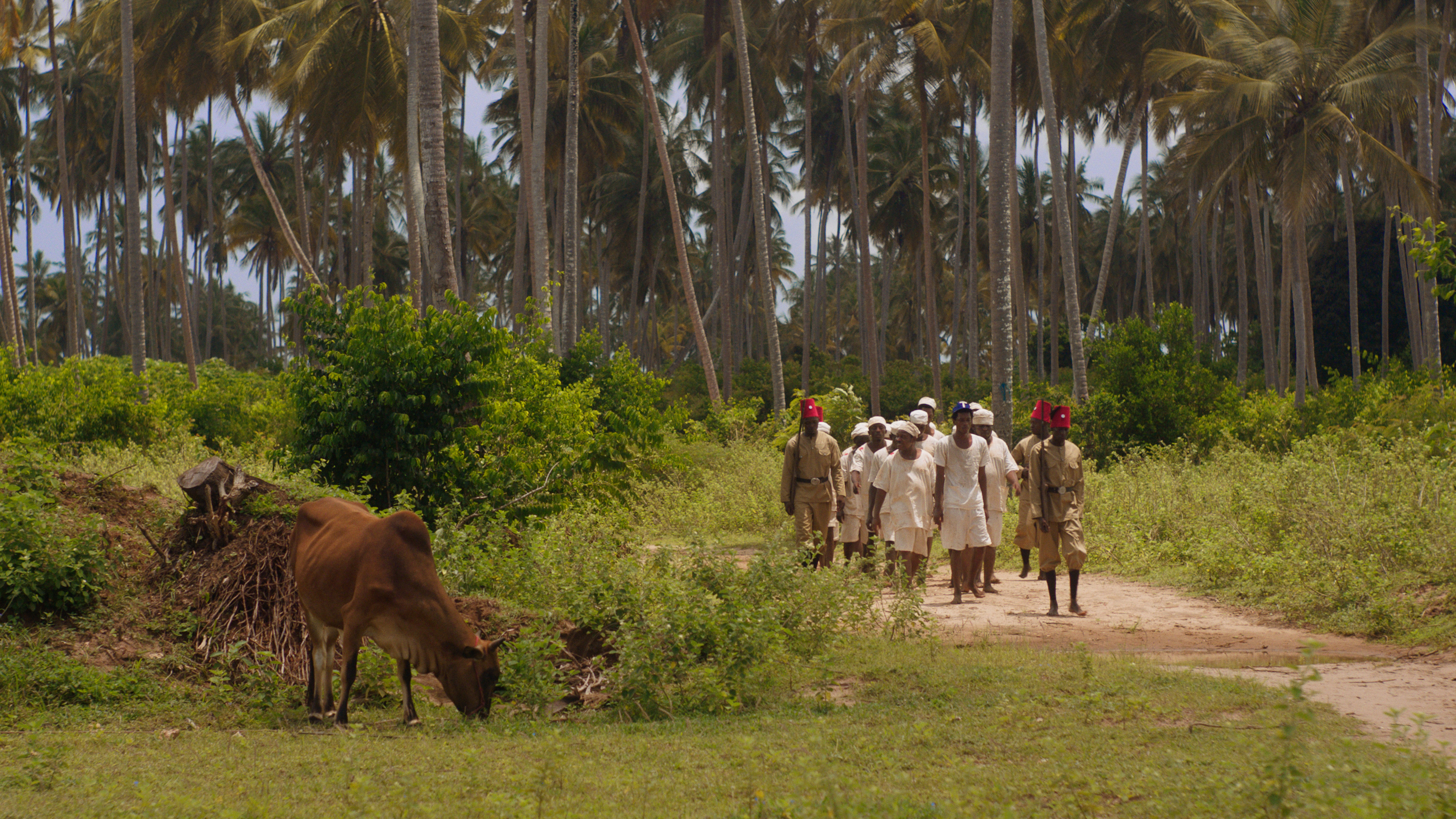
A still from Tug of War (Vuta N'Kuvute)

== Festival showings ==
- Toronto International Film Festival (2021) where it was the first Tanzanian film to be screened at TIFF
- African Film Festival (2022)
- Seattle International Film Festival (2022)
- Black Star Film Festival (2022)
- Afrika Film Festival Cologne (2022)
- Afrykamera (2022)
- Qisah International Film Festival (2022)
- Carthage Film Festival (2022)
- International Film Festival of Kerala (2022)

== Accolades ==
- Best Feature Film Zanzibar International Film Festival 2022 (Tanzania)
- Best East African Feature Film Zanzibar International Film Festival 2022 (Tanzania)
- Best Actor Zanzibar International Film Festival 2022 (Tanzania)
- Special Jury Prize Seattle International Film Festival 2022 (USA)
- Best Long Fiction Mashariki African Film Festival 2021 (Rwanda)
- Oumarou Ganda Prize for Best Fiction FESPACO 2021 (Burkina Faso)
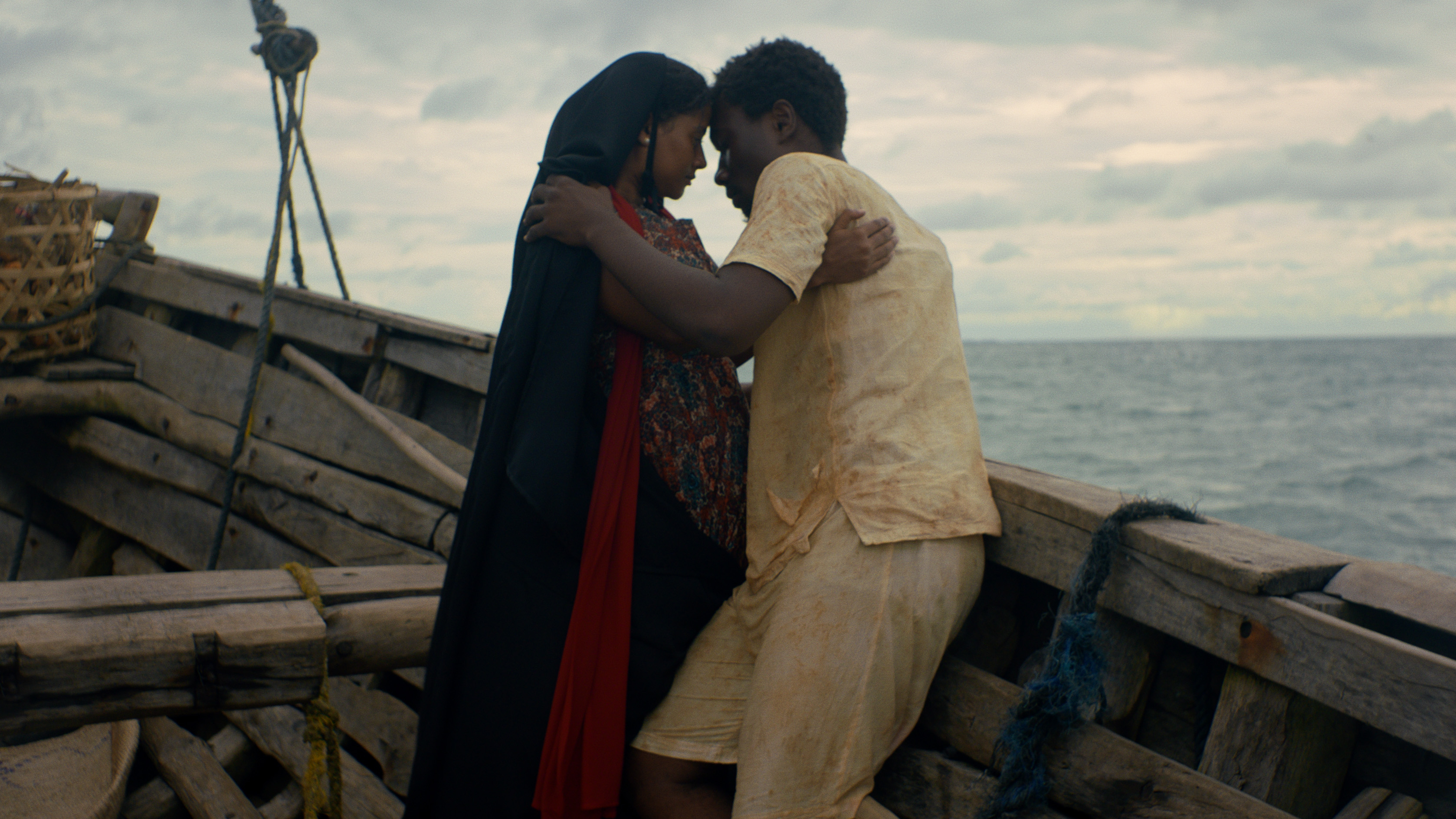
  A still from Tug of War (Vuta N'Kuvute)
- Doha Film Institute Post Production Fund Spring 2020 (Qatar)
- Visions Sud Est Post Production Fund 2020 (Switzerland)
- World Cinema Production Fund 2019 (Germany)
