= Ladder to Damascus =

2013 film by Syrian filmmaker Mohammad Malas

Ladder to Damascus سلم إلى دمشق
- Film poster
- Directed by: Mohammad Malas
- Written by: Samer Mohamad Ismail; Mohammad Malas
- Produced by: Georges Schoucair
- Starring: Najla El Wa'za
- Cinematography: Joude Gorani
- Release date: 8 September 2013 (TIFF)
- Running time: 95 minutes
- Country: Syria
- Language: Arabic

Ladder to Damascus (Arabic: سلم إلى دمشق) is a 2013 Syrian drama film directed by Mohammad Malas. It was screened in the Contemporary World Cinema section at the 2013 Toronto International Film Festival.

== Cast ==
- Najla el Wa'za
- Lara Saade
- Bilal Martini
- Gianna Aanid
- Mohamad Zarzour
