= The Dream (1987 film) =

The Dream (Al-Manam) المنام
- Directed by: Mohammad Malas
- Produced by: Maram Cinema
- Cinematography: Hazem Baya‘a
- Release date: 1987
- Running time: 45 minutes
- Country: Syria
- Language: Arabic

The Dream or Al-Manam (Arabic: المنام) is a 1987 Syrian documentary film by the director Mohammad Malas. The film is composed of a collection of interviews with Palestinian refugees in Lebanon during the civil war. The refugees were interviewed by Malas about what dreams they saw when they went to sleep. The film was shot between 1980–81 before the infamous massacre in Sabra and Shatila, where part of the film was set. It was only released in 1987.

== Synopsis ==
The film was composed of several interviews with different Palestinian refugees including children, women, old people, and militants from the refugee camps in Lebanon. In the interviews Malas questions his subjects about their dreams at night. Through their answers, the film attempts to reveal the underlying subconsciousness of the Palestinian refugee. The dreams always converge on Palestine; a woman recounts her dreams about winning the war; a fedai of bombardment and martyrdom; and one man tells of a dream where he meets and is ignored by Gulf emirs. According to Rebecca Porteous, the film constructs "the psychology of dispossession; the daily reality behind those slogans of nationhood, freedom, land and resistance, for people who have lost all of these things, except their recourse to the last."

== Production ==
Filming began in 1980, and the first stage was completed in September 1981. The film was shot between the Sabra, Shatila, Bourj el-Barajneh, Ain al-Hilweh and Rashidieh refugee camps. During filming Malas lived in the camps and conducted interviews with more than 400 people. In 1982, the Sabra and Shatila massacre caused Malas to stop working on the project. "I was paralyzed with grief and anxiety for the friends I had made. I had to do something else and so I turned my attention to City Dreams," Malas reportedly said of the event, where several interviewees were killed. The critical success of his feature film, Ahlam al-Madina ("Dreams of a City"), allowed him to return to the project after five years. In 1986 he edited the many hours of footage he had into a final cut of 45 minutes.

== Release and reception ==
The film was eventually released in 1987 to "great acclaim" both in the Arab world and Europe where it was shown on television in France and England. Before its official screening, the film was smuggled to the refugee camps under siege and shown there first. The Dream won first prize at the 1987 Cannes International Audio Visual Festival (FIPA) but was not widely distributed thereafter.

In 1988, Malas published a subsequent book about the interviews and the film under the title, The Dream: Diary of a Film (Arabic: المنام: مفكرة فلم).

== See also ==
- Cinema of Syria
