= Yasmine Khlat =

Lebanese actress and film director (born 1959)

Yasmine Khtat (born February 13, 1959) is a Lebanese actress, film director, translator and novelist.

She was born in Ismailia, Egypt, grew up in Lebanon and studied film theory in the University of Paris 3.

== Work ==
=== As an actress ===
- 1984:Dreams of the City
- 1980: Aziza
- 1979: Nahla, as Nahla

=== Documentaries ===
- 2ooo: Abed Azrie: Musicien du Monde
- 1987: Leylouna/Notre nuit; about the everyday life of women during the Lebanese Civil War

=== Books ===
- 2023: La Tendresse de Sainte Anne
- 2022:La Dame d'Alexandrie
  - From book cover: "A convent lost in the Lebanese mountains, on the edge of a blue valley. The misty beauty of autumn. The rain, the cold, the barking of a dog in the distance. The quiet passage of nuns in the corridors. And this closed session between two women: the enigmatic Hortense Zemina, charming sociologist of a “certain age”, and Claire, her young and fiery assistant recruited through classified ads. Together, they try to elucidate the mystery of repeated suicides within the same family."
- 2020: Cet amour
  - From the back cover: "A small apartment in Paris. A woman can no longer stand her ocds - her obsessive-compulsive tics. She stares at her living room window, drawn towards the void. Then she reacts, goes to her phone and dials a number: Hello, Doctor Rossi? A discussion begins in the night with this psychiatrist whose voice she only heard on the radio. He grasps her distress, keeps her head above water. But she is Lebanese, and he turns out to be Israeli. However, his country prohibits any contact with an Israeli citizen. Can they even talk to each other? Can wars, virtual and real walls separate two beings who meet?"
- 2019: Égypte 51 (shortlisted at the 2019 Grand prix du roman métis)
- 2010: Vous me direz au crépuscule
- 2006: Le diamantaire
- 2004: Partition libre pour Isabelle
- 2001: Le désespoir est un péché (Despair is a Sin)
- Naïve

== Awards ==
- 2001: Prix des cinq continents de la francophonie for her novel Le désespoir est un péché
- 1979: 11th Moscow International Film Festival, Best Actress award for Nahla.
