= Dreams of the City =

Dreams of the City (Ahlam al-Madina) أحلام المدينة
- Directed by: Mohamed Malas
- Written by: Mohamed Malas; Samir Zikra
- Produced by: General Organization for Cinema
- Starring: Rafiq Sbei'i; Hicham Khchefati; Yasmine Khlat; Bassel Abyad; Ayman Zeidan
- Cinematography: Ordijan Anjin
- Edited by: Haitham Kuwwatli
- Distributed by: General Organization for Cinema
- Release date: 1984
- Running time: 120 minutes
- Country: Syria
- Language: Arabic

Dreams of the City or Ahlam al-Madina (Arabic: أحلام المدينة, lit. 'Dreams of the City') is a Syrian feature drama film by director Mohamed Malas. It is a coming-of-age story of a boy forced to flee his native Quneitra to Damascus in the turbulent 1950s.

== Plot ==
The story is an autobiography of Dib, the main character in the film. Dib was brought up by a brutal father-in-law and a mother who was forced into a new marriage. This is partly an autobiography of Malas himself. It is set against the backdrop of the major political events of the 1950s in Syria and Egypt: the end of the dictatorship in Syria, Gamal Abdel Nasser's ascent to power and the nationalisation of the Suez Canal, and the short-lived The United Arab Republic between Syria and Egypt in 1958.

== Awards ==
- Carthage Film Festival- Tanit d'Or, 1985.
- Berlin International Film Festival - Interfilm Award - Honorable Mention, 1985.
- Valencia Festival of Mediterranean Cinema - Golden Palm, 1985.
