= Aziza (1980 film) =

- Directed by: Abdellatif Ben Ammar
- Written by: Abdellatif Ben Ammar; Taoufik Jebali
- Produced by: Hassen Daldoul
- Starring: Yasmine Khlat; Raouf Ben Amor; Dalila Rames; Mohamed Zinet; Taoufik Jebali; Mouna Noureddine
- Cinematography: Youcef Sahraoui
- Edited by: Moufida Tlatli
- Release date: 1980
- Countries: Tunisia; Algeria
- Language: Arabic

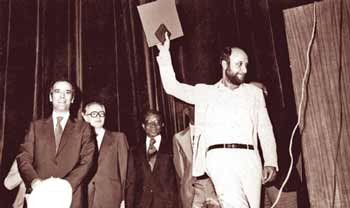
Tunisian director Abdellatif Ben Ammar receiving the Tanit d'Or for his film Aziza at the 1980 Carthage Film Festival.

Aziza is a 1980 Tunisian and Algerian drama film directed by Abdellatif Ben Ammar and produced by Hassen Daldoul. The film stars Yasmine Khlat, Raouf Ben Amor, Dalila Rames and Mohamed Zinet in the lead roles.

The film was screened at the Directors' Fortnight section of the 1980 Cannes Film Festival.

== Cast ==
- Yasmine Khlat
- Raouf Ben Amor
- Dalila Rames
- Mohamed Zinet
- Taoufik Jebali
- Mouna Noureddine
