= A Simple Story (1970 film) =

1970 film

- Film poster
- Directed by: Abdellatif Ben Ammar
- Written by: Abdellatif Ben Ammar
- Starring: Labiba Ben Ammar
- Cinematography: Lotfi Layouni
- Release date: 1970
- Country: Tunisia
- Language: French

A Simple Story (French: Une si simple histoire) is a 1970 Tunisian drama film directed by Abdellatif Ben Ammar. It was entered into the 1970 Cannes Film Festival.

== Cast ==
- Labiba Ben Ammar
- Juliet Berto
- Pia Colombo
- Amor Khalfa
- Jamila Ourabi
- Fouad Zaouch
