= Mansour Sora Wade =

Senegalese film director

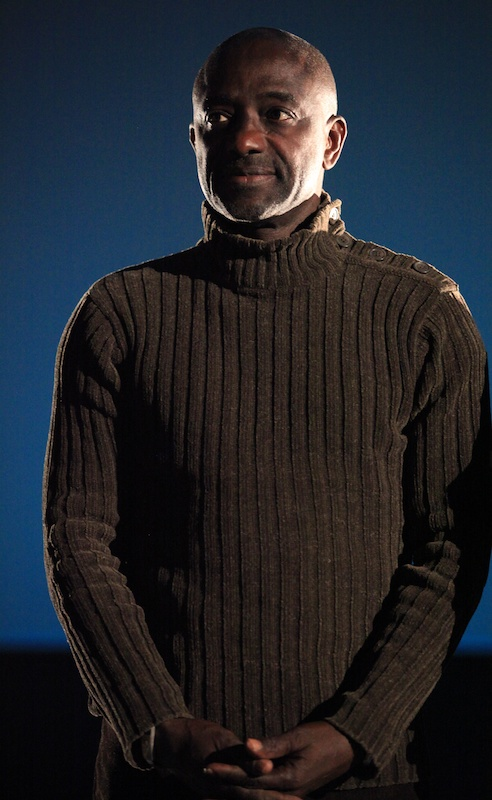
- Born: 1952 (age 73–74); Dakar
- Education: Paris 8 University
- Occupation: Film director
- Years active: 1983-till present
- Awards: Tanit d'or

Mansour Sora Wade (born 1952, in Dakar) is a Senegalese film director of Lebou people ancestry.

== Education and Career ==
He studied at Paris 8 University and went on to direct the audiovisual archives for the Senegalese Ministry of Culture, a job he held from 1977 to 1985. He began making short films in 1983. In 2002 he won the Tanit d'or.

== Partial filmography ==
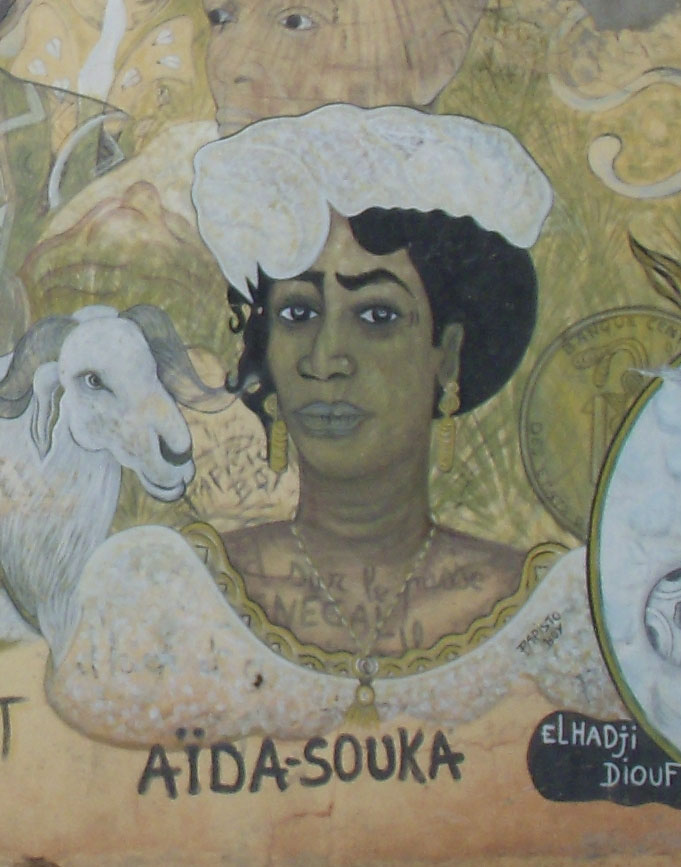
Aïda Souka

- 1983 : Contrastes (CM)
- 1989 : Fary l'ânesse (CM)
- 1990 : Taal Pexx
- 1992 : Picc Mi (CM)
- 1993 : Aida Souka
- 2002 : Ndeysaan ou Le Prix du pardon (LM)
- 2009 : Les feux de Mansaré
