= The Night (1992 film) =

The Night (al-Lail) الليل
- Al-lail
- Directed by: Mohamed Malas
- Written by: Mohamed Malas; Ussama Muhammed
- Produced by: Omar Amiralay
- Starring: Sabah Jazairi; Omar Malas; Riadh Chahrour; Maher Salibi; Fares Helou
- Cinematography: Youssef Ben Youssef
- Edited by: Kais Al Zubaidi
- Distributed by: General Organization for Cinema
- Release date: 1992
- Running time: 116 minutes
- Country: Syria
- Language: Arabic

The Night or Al-lail (Arabic: الليل, lit. 'The Night') is a Syrian feature drama film by director Mohamed Malas. The film is set in Quneitra and is about the Arab-Israeli conflict. In 1993 it became the first Syrian feature to be played at the New York Film Festival.

== Plot ==
Set in the town of Quneitra, Syria, the film follows a young man's attempt to reconstruct the fractured history of his late father, a veteran of the 1948 Palestinian War. Through a series of non-linear, poetic flashbacks, the narrative explores the father’s idealistic departure to join the resistance, his subsequent return following the Arab defeat, and the atmosphere of disillusionment that pervaded the region during the transition from the French Mandate to Syrian independence. As the son interrogates his mother’s memories and the town's collective past, the story culminates in the eventual destruction of Quneitra during the 1967 Six-Day War, serving as a meditation on how the political failures of the father’s generation shaped the identity and trauma of the son’s.

== Awards ==
- Carthage Film Festival - Tanit d'Or, 1992.
