= The Price of Forgiveness =

2001 film by Mansour Sora Wade

Ndeyssaan
- Directed by: Mansour Sora Wade
- Screenplay by: Mansour Sora Wade Nar Sene
- Produced by: Les Films du Safran Kaany Productions
- Starring: Hubert Koundé; Rokhaya Niang
- Cinematography: Pierre-Olivier Larrieu
- Edited by: Christian Billette
- Music by: Wasis Diop Loy Ehrlich Youssou Ndour
- Release date: 2001
- Running time: 90 minutes
- Countries: France; Senegal
- Language: Wolof

Ndeyssaan (English title: The Price of Forgiveness) is a 2001 French / Senegalese film.

== The name of film ==
The word "Ndeyssaan" is an exclamation expressing love and surprise in Wolof language.

== Synopsis ==
For too long, a strange mist has covered a fishing village. In this atmosphere, favorable to enhancing fear and superstitions, Yatma and Mbanick, two childhood friends, compete to seduce Maxoye. Mbanick, the son of a marabout, challenges the spirits and manages to make the mist disappear. The entire village honors him; the inhabitants revive under the sun's warm rays. The fishermen return to the sea, the market recovers its colors. Maxoye and Mbanick make their relationship public. However, Yatma does not accept Mbanick's newfound popularity. A deadly fight ensues between them.

== Cast ==
- Hubert Koundé - Yatma
- Rokhaya Niang - Maxoye
- Gora Seck - Mbanik
- Alioune Ndiaye - Amul Yaakaar
- Nar Sene - Peer
- Thierno Ndiaye Doss - Adu Seck

== Awards ==
- Cartago 2002
- Fribourg 2002

== Bibliography ==
- Ndeysaan - The Price of Forgiveness, California Newsreel, Access date: 16 May 2022
- Ndeysaan (The Price of Forgiveness), Educational Media Reviews Online, Access date: 16 May 2022
