= Imunga Ivanga =

Gabonese filmmaker (born 1967)

- Born: 1967 (age 57–58); Libreville
- Citizenship: Gabon
- Occupation(s): Film director, Screenwriter, Film producer, Film critic

Imunga Ivanga (born 1967 in Libreville, Gabon) is a Gabonese filmmaker.

== Biography ==
He was born in 1967 in Libreville, Gabon. He studied at University of Libreville and has a masters in literature. Also, he speaks several languages like Mpongwe, French, English, Spanish and Italian. After a year studying film at the FEMIS in Paris, he specialised in script-writing and in 1996 obtained his degree. Also, he is a prolific writer and he has written several scripts for short films, clips and documentaries.
