= Lemta =

Lemta لمطة
- Town
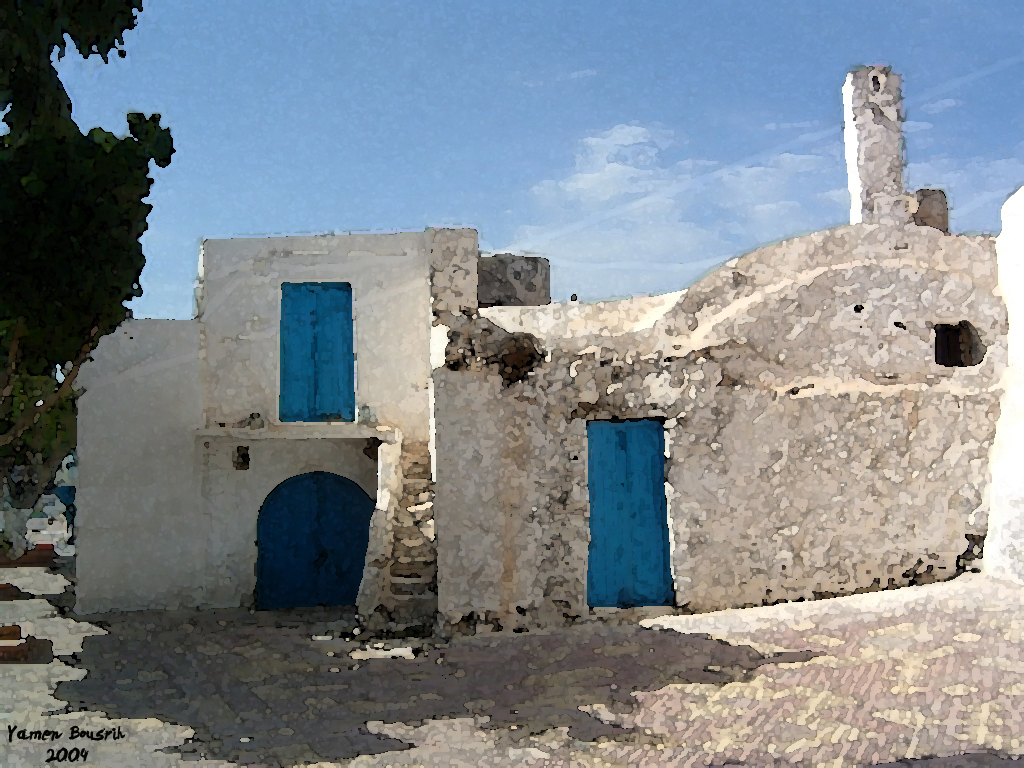
- Old building in the city of Lemta.

- Location in Tunisia
- Coordinates: 35°40′31″N 10°52′50″E
- Country: Tunisia
- Governorate: Monastir Governorate

Population (2014)
  - Total: 6,125

Lemta, historically Leptiminus, is a town in Tunisia with a history going back over 3,000 years.

== History ==
The history of the town starts in the 13th century b.c.e. with the founding attributed to Phoenician sailors.

Leptiminus, as it was called, became an ancient port city in Tunisia that flourished under Roman rule in the time of the empire. Hannibal, following the second Punic War, disembarked here on his return from Italy.

== Today ==
The growing town, now a textile production center, hosts several excavation sites currently under Tunisian, American, and Canadian direction.

== See also ==
- Ribat of Lamta
- Lamta Archaeological Museum
