= Michel Khleifi =

Palestinian filmmaker

Michel Khleifi (Arabic: ميشيل خليفي), born in 1950 in Nazareth, is a Palestinian (48-Palestinian) film writer, director and producer, presently based in Belgium.

Khleifi emigrated to Belgium in 1970, where he studied television and theatre directing at the Institut National Supérieur des Arts du Spectacle (INSAS). After graduating from INSAS, he worked in Belgium television before turning to making his own films. He has directed and produced several documentary and feature films. He has received several awards, including the International Critics’ Prize at the Cannes Film Festival, the Golden Shell at San Sebastián International Film Festival and the André Cavens Award in 1987 for his film Wedding in Galilee. Khleifi currently teaches at INSAS.

Haaretz referred to Khleifi as "a trailblazer in bringing the Palestinian perspective to world screens".

== Filmography ==
- Fertile Memory (1980)
- Ma'loul Celebrates its Destruction (1985)
- Wedding in Galilee (also known as Arabic عرس الجليل transliteration Urs al-Jalil (1987)
- Canticle of the Stones (1990)
- L'Ordre du Jour (1993)
- Tale of the Three Jewels (1995)
- Route 181: Fragments of a Journey in Palestine-Israel (2003), in collaboration with Eyal Sivan
- Zindeeq (2009)

== Awards ==
- International Critics Prize, Cannes and the André Cavens Award for Wedding in Galilee (1987)
- Special Jury Prize at Yamagata International Documentary Film Festival for Canticle of the Stones (1991)
- Mayor's Prize, at the Yamagata International Documentary Film Festival for Route 181: Fragments of a Journey in Palestine-Israel (with Eyal Sivan) (2005)
- Muhr award for "Best Arab Feature Film" at the Dubai International Film Festival (DIFF) (2009)
