= Mohammad Malas =

Syrian filmmaker

- محمد ملص
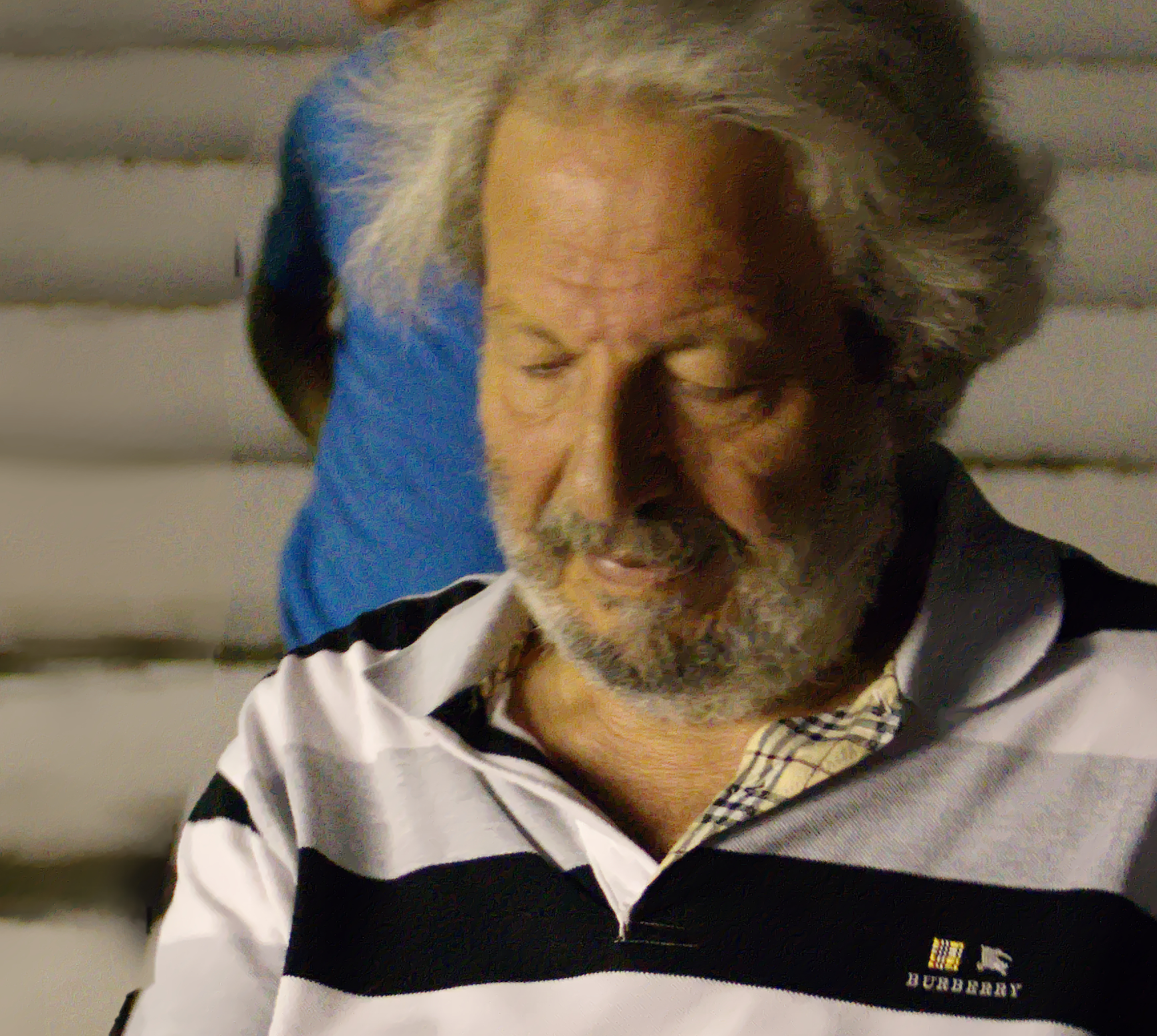
- Born: 1945 (age 80–81); Quneitra, Syria
- Years active: 1970–
- Awards: Carthage Film Festival – Tanit d'Or; 1984 Ahlam al-Madina; Berlin International Film Festival – Interfilm Award – Honorable Mention; 1985 Ahlam al-Madina; Carthage Film Festival – Tanit d'Or; 1992 al-Lail; Fribourg International Film Festival – Distribution Help Award; 1993 al-Lail; Marrakech International Film Festival – Special Jury Award; 2005 Bab al-Makam

Mohammad Malas (Arabic: محمد ملص; born 1945) is a prominent Syrian filmmaker. Malas directed several documentary and feature films that garnered international recognition. He is among the first auteur filmmakers in Syrian cinema.

== Early life ==
Malas was born in Quneitra on the Golan Heights. He worked as a school teacher between 1965 and 1968 before moving to Moscow to study filmmaking at the Gerasimov Institute of Cinematography (VGIK). During his time at VGIK Malas directed several short films. After his return to Syria he started working at the Syrian Television. There he produced several short films including Quneitra 74, in 1974 and al-Zhakira ("The Memory") in 1977. Along with Omar Amiralay he co-founded the Damascus Cinema Club.

== Filmmaking career ==
Between 1980–81 Malas shot a documentary film, al-Manam (Arabic: المنام, lit. 'The Dream'), about the Palestinians living in the refugee camps in Lebanon during the civil war. He interviewed refugees on their dreams, living alongside them in camps. He stopped working on the film after the Sabra and Shatila massacre, where multiple interviewees were killed. He edited and released the film in 1987. Al-Manam won first prize at the 1987 Cannes International Audio Visual Festival (FIPA) but was not widely distributed.

Malas directed his first feature film, Ahlam al-Madina (Arabic: أحلام المدينة, lit. 'Dreams of the City'), in 1983. The autobiographical coming-of-age film set in Damascus in the 1950s was co-written with Samir Zikra and received first prize at the Valencia and Carthage film festivals. In 1990 Malas shot Nur wa Zilal ("Chiaroscuro"), a documentary film about Nazih Shahbandar whom he described as "Syria's first filmmaker." The film was banned by Syrian authorities and was only allowed to be screened once in 1993 at the American Cultural Center in Damascus.

Malas's second feature film, al-Lail (Arabic: الليل, lit. 'The Night'), was realized in 1992. The autobiographical film was set in Quneitra in the years between 1936 and the Arab–Israeli War of 1948. It forms, along with Ahlam al-Madina, the first and second parts of an unfinished trilogy project of Malas's. Al-Lail received international recognition and won first prize at the 1992 Carthage Film Festival. However, the film was banned in Syria and was only screened for the first time in 1996. Malas also collaborated with Omar Amiralay on the 1996 documentary film, Moudaress, about the Syrian pioneer painter Fateh Moudarres. Bab al-Makam (Arabic: باب المقام, lit. 'Passion'), released in 2005, was Malas's third feature film.

== Filmography ==
- A Dream of a Small City (1970)
- Quneitra 74 (1974)
- The Memory (1977)
- Dreams of the City (1983)
- The Dream (1987)
- Chiaroscuro (1990)
- The Night (1992)
- Moudaress (1996)
- Passion (2005)
- Ladder to Damascus (2013)

== See also ==
- Cinema of Syria
