= Cinema of Tunisia =

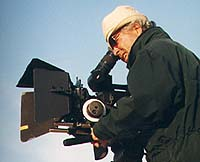
- Naceur Ktari (2000)
- No. of screens: 48 (As of July 2022)
  - Per capita: 0.2 per 100,000 (2009)

Produced feature films (2005–2009)
- Total: 4 (average)

Number of admissions (2008)
- Total: 600,000

The cinema of Tunisia began in 1896, when the Lumière brothers began showing animated films in the streets of Tunis.

== History ==
The first feature-length movie produced in North Africa, Les Cinq gentlemen maudits (The Five Accursed Gentlemen), was filmed in Tunisia by French director Luitz-Morat. In 1922, Tunisian Albert Samama Chikly directed Zohra followed by Ain Al-Ghazal (The Girl from Carthage) in 1924, making him one of the first native North African filmmakers. In 1964, Tunisia's first film festival was held: the Festival International du Film Amateur de Kélibia.

In 1966, the first Tunisian feature film (95 minutes) Al-Fajr (The Dawn) about the fight against French colonizers, was directed and produced by Omar Khlifi and shot on a 35 mm film. Tunisia also hosts the Carthage Film Festival established in 1966. The festival gives priority to films from Arab-speaking and African countries and is the oldest film festival on the African continent.

In 1927, Tunis-Film, the first Tunisian film distribution company was established. After the country's independence, movies were exclusively produced by Société Anonyme Tunisienne de Production et d'Expansion Cinématographique (SATPEC). Founded in 1964 by the President Habib Bourguiba, SATPEC controlled cinema and filming productions in the country at the time. During the 1980s, private production companies and studios emerged with the aim to make Tunisia the Mediterranean Hollywood. Tunisian producer Tarak Ben Ammar, a nephew of president Bourguiba, created the first film studio in Tunisia and succeeded in attracting notable production companies to shoot at his studios in Monastir. These included Roman Polanski's Pirates and Franco Zeffirelli's Jesus of Nazareth. After visiting Tunisia George Lucas, inspired by the natural beauty and old architecture of some Southern Tunisian towns, decided to film important scenes of Star Wars, as well as Indiana Jones in the country. Anthony Minghella also filmed the Academy Awards winning The English Patient in a south-west oasis of the country.

Domestic productions were rare: the few movies which were produced since 1967 tried to reflect the new social dynamics, development, identity research, and modernity shock. Some of them achieved relative success outside Tunisia, such as La Goulette (Halq El-Wadi 1996) directed by Ferid Boughedir which showed a flashback of typical community life in the small suburb of La Goulette in a period where Muslims, Jews and Christians lived together in tolerance and peace. Halfaouine: Child of the Terraces (Asfour Stah 1990), also by Boughedir, is possibly the biggest success in the history of Tunisian cinema. The movie showed the life of a child from the Halfaouine suburb of Tunis in the 60s, on a quest to understand relationships, the world of women, and how to be a man. In another earlier movie entitled Man of Ashes (Rih Essedd 1986) Boughedir again depicted Tunisian society without fear or favour, covering prostitution, paedophilia, and inter-faith relations between Tunisian Muslims and Tunisian Jews. In the 1991 film Bezness, he talked about the emerging sexual tourism inside the country. The Ambassadors (As-Soufraa 1975) directed by Naceur Ktari portrayed the life of immigrant Maghrebins in France and their struggle against racism. The film won the Golden Tanit for the best picture during the Carthage Film Festival in 1976, the special jury award from the Locarno International Film Festival in the same year and it has been classified in the Un Certain Regard category during the 1978 Cannes Film Festival.

The first Tunisian actress was Haydée Chikly, who starred in the short film, Zohra in 1922. The first feature film to be directed by a woman was Fatma 75 (1975) by Selma Baccar. Subsequent female directors films such as Néjia Ben Mabrouk's Sama (1988) and Moufida Tlatli's The Silences of Palace (1994).

In 2007, several films were produced and grabbed public attention, such as Making Of, directed by Nouri Bouzid and Nejib Belkadi's VHS Kahloucha.

In 2013, Abdellatif Kechiche was the first-ever Tunisian director to win the Palme D'Or award. For his film Blue Is the Warmest Colour he split the award with his two lead actresses.

On March 21, 2018, the country opened its first City of Culture, a project one of its kind in Africa and the Arab world, located in downtown Tunis. The complex contains several theaters, cinemas, screens, art and history galleries, exhibition halls, a contemporary and modern art museum, a national book centre and a cultural investment centre.

The first ever Cineplex in Tunisia opened in Tunis City mall in Tunis in December 2018, it consists of 8 screens and is operated by Les Cinémas Gaumont Pathé. Two other multiplexes are set to open by Les Cinémas Gaumont Pathé in the coming years, one containing 8 screens at new Azur city mall in Banlieu Sud of Tunis and one of 6 screens in Sousse. Hotel chain La cigale announced in 2017, that it is building a hotel along with a mall and a multiplex of 10 screens in Gammarth, Banlieue Nord of Tunis and is set to open in 2020.

Around 2015, there were less than 30 screens under commercial use all across Tunisia, a number that is widely considered low in international standards for a country with a population of 11 millions. In November 2019, the number was estimated at 41 screens all across Tunisia. The country has seen a significant increase in theaters in recent years thanks to a renewed interest in movie-going as well as the development of multiplexes, a newly introduced concept in the country. As of July 2022, there are 48 screens all across Tunisia.

=== Academy Award nominations ===
Tunisia has submitted films for the Academy Award for Best Foreign Language Film on an irregular basis since 1995. The award is handed out annually by the United States Academy of Motion Picture Arts and Sciences to a feature-length motion picture produced outside the United States that contains primarily non-English dialogue. As of 2023, ten Tunisian films have been submitted for the Academy Award for Best International Feature Film. The Man Who Sold His Skin was nominated for the Academy Award for Best International Feature Film at 93rd Academy Awards. It became the first Tunisian film to be nominated for an Academy Award. The documentary film Four Daughters was nominated for Best Documentary Feature at 96th Academy Awards. Both films were directed by Kaouther Ben Hania and with the nomination of Four Daughters, Hania became the first Arab Woman to earn two Academy Award nominations. The Voice of Hind Rajab, a dramatization of the attempted rescue of a young girl in Gaza, was nominated in 2025.

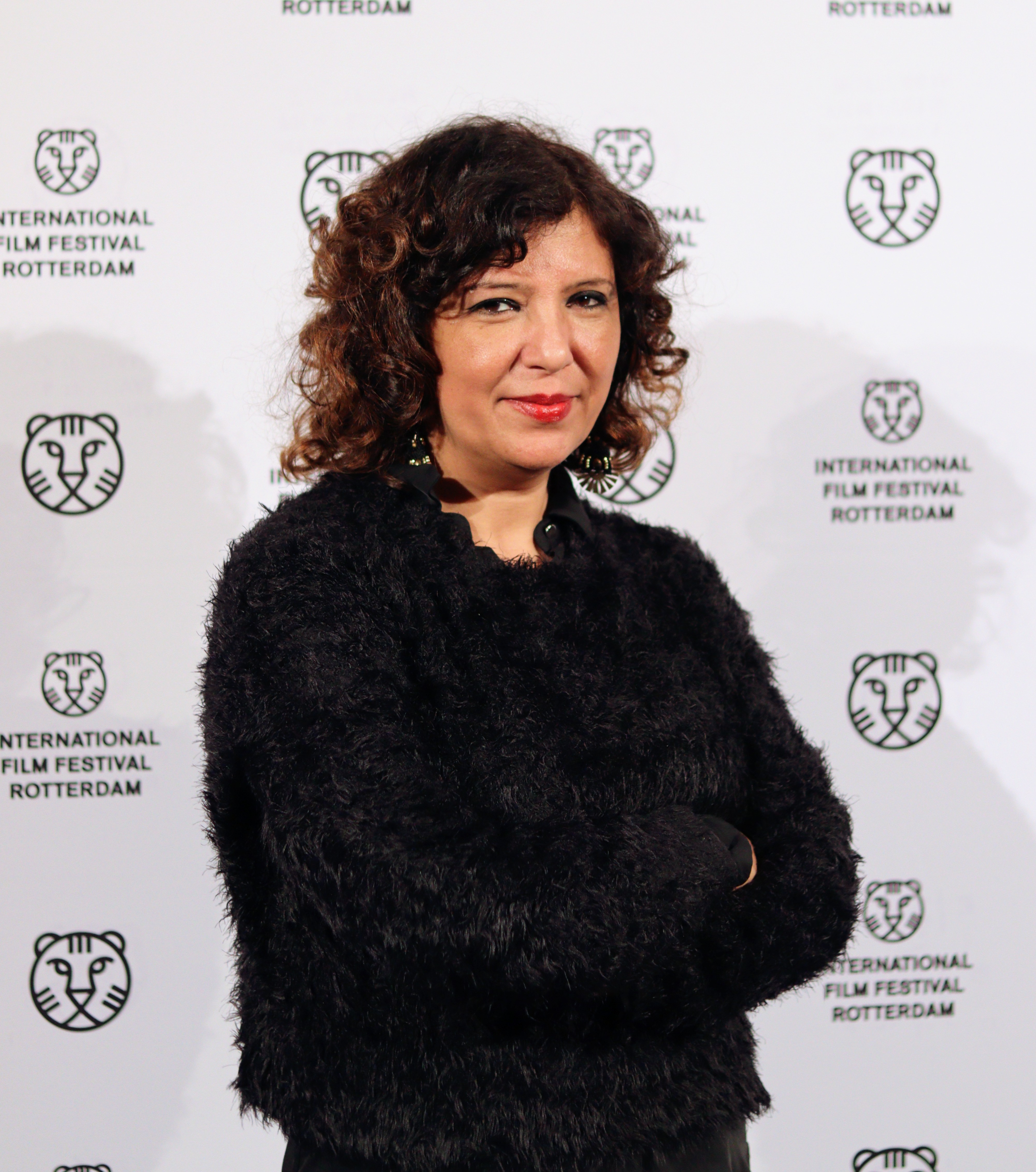
Kaouther Ben Hania

== See also ==
- Tunisia
- Arab cinema
- Egyptian cinema
- Cinema of the world
