= Presidio =

Fort type

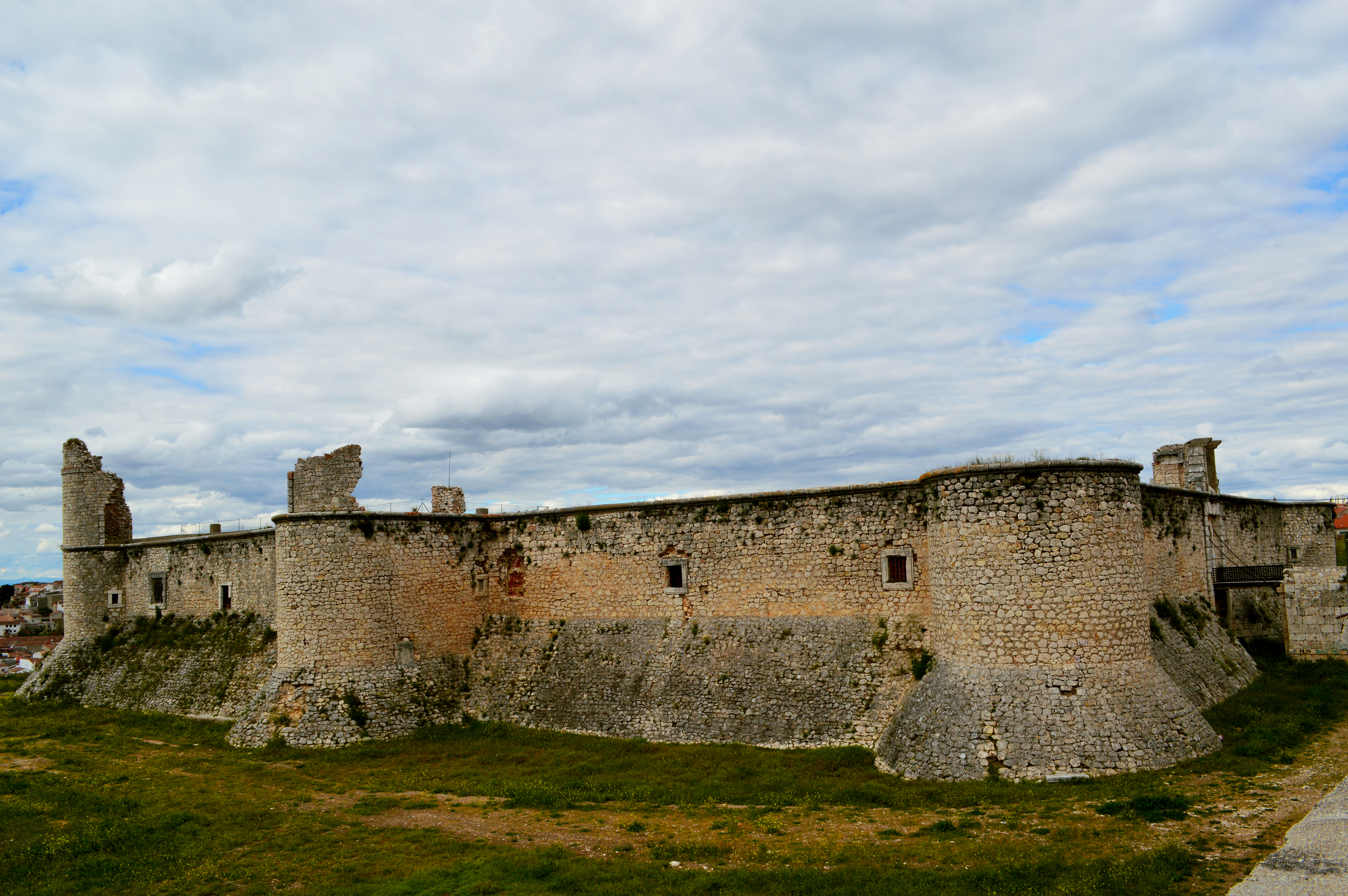
Ruins of Castle of Chinchón resembling Spanish colonial presidios

A presidio (jail, fortification) was a fortified base established by the Spanish Empire mainly between the 16th and 18th centuries in areas under their control or influence. The term is derived from the Latin word praesidium meaning protection or defense.

In the Mediterranean and the Philippines, the presidios were outposts of defense against raids by Muslims. In the Americas, the fortresses were built to protect against raids by pirates, rival colonial powers, and Native Americans.

Later in western North America, with independence, the Mexicans garrisoned the Spanish presidios on the northern frontier and followed the same pattern in unsettled frontier regions such as the Sonoma Barracks in what is now California and the Presidio de Calabasas in what is now Arizona.

In western North America, a rancho del rey or king's ranch would be established a short distance outside a presidio. This was a tract of land assigned to the presidio to furnish pasturage to the horses and other beasts of burden of the garrison. Mexico called this facility a rancho nacional. Presidios were only accessible to Spanish military and soldiers.

== Canada ==
- Fort San Miguel

== Italy ==
Several fortresses formerly held by the Republic of Siena were acquired by Spain following the latter's demise, by treaty between Philip II of Spain and Cosimo I de' Medici, Grand Duke of Tuscany on 3 July 1557, to form what became known as the Estado de los Presidios. They were held by Spain until the War of the Spanish Succession, when they came under Austrian ownership, and were administered from Naples.

- Porto Ercole
- Porto Santo Stefano
- Orbetello
- Talamone
- Ansedonia
- Giannutri
- Porto Azzurro
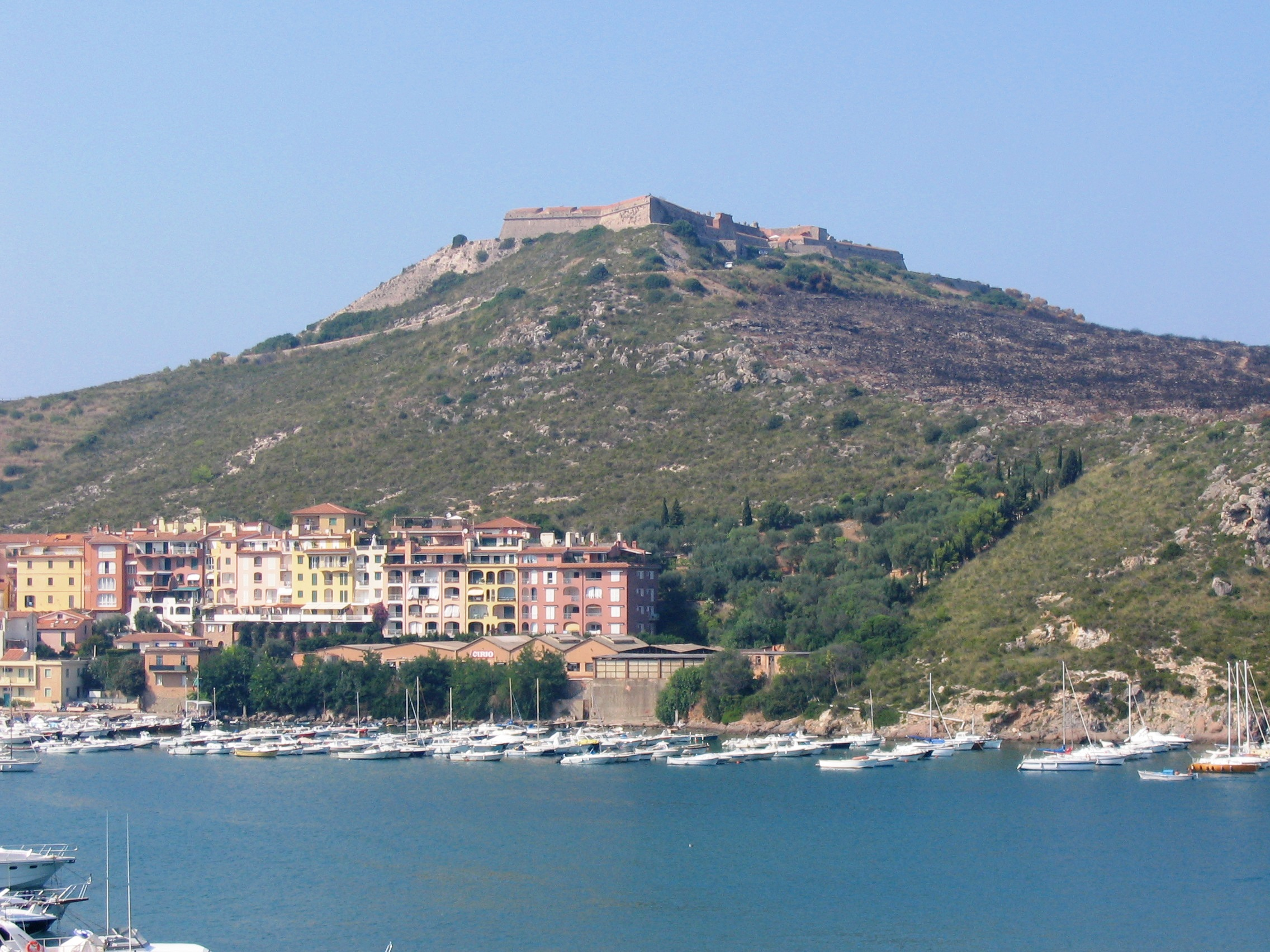
Forte Filippo (Philip II Fortress), Porto Ercole

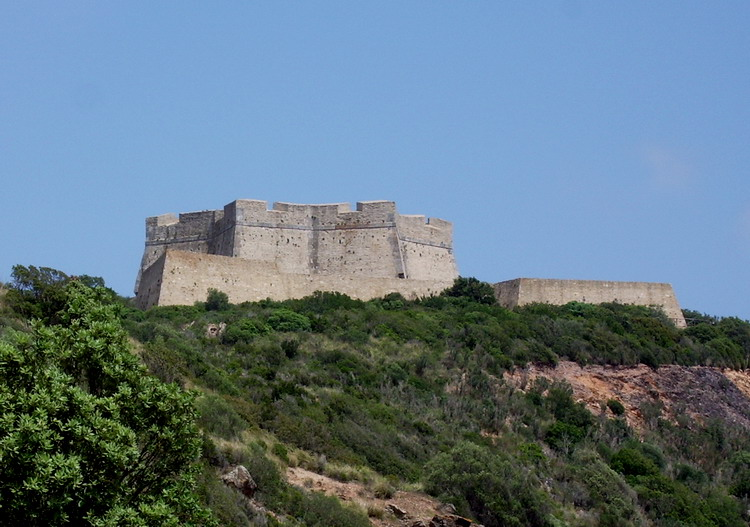
Forte Stella, Porto Ercole

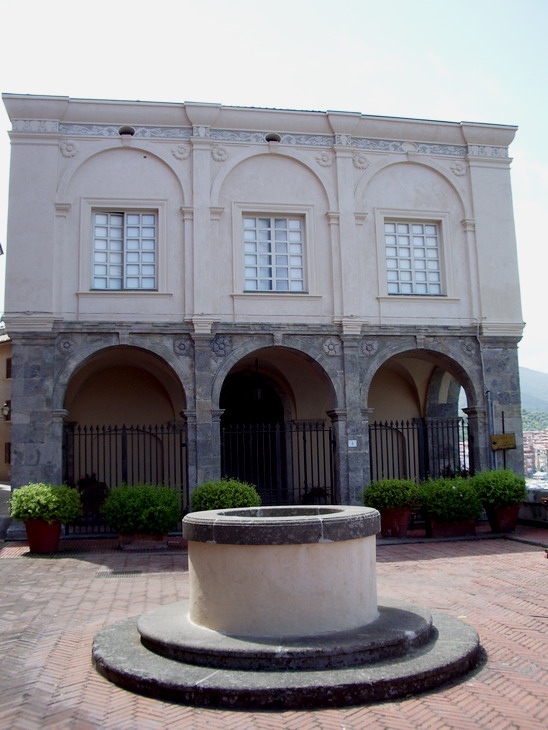
Governors Palace, Porto Ercole

== Mexico ==
Few presidios were established in the present-day desert frontier regions in northern Mexico to control and confine the existing rebellious indigenous tribes. Captured indigenous warriors were confined and enslaved at the presidio. Presidios was used to protect the colonial silver ship from rebellious raids from Indians in Camino Real de Tierra Adentro, mainly in Zacatecas and Guanajuato, starting new settlements.

=== Aguascalientes ===
- The Presidio de las Bocas and later Presidio de las Bocas de Gallardo, founded in 1570 in Asientos. Today reconverted into the hacienda de Santa María de Gallardo.
- The Presidio de Ciénega Grande, founded in 1570 in Asientos. Today reconverted into the hacienda Ciénega Grande.

=== Baja California Sur ===
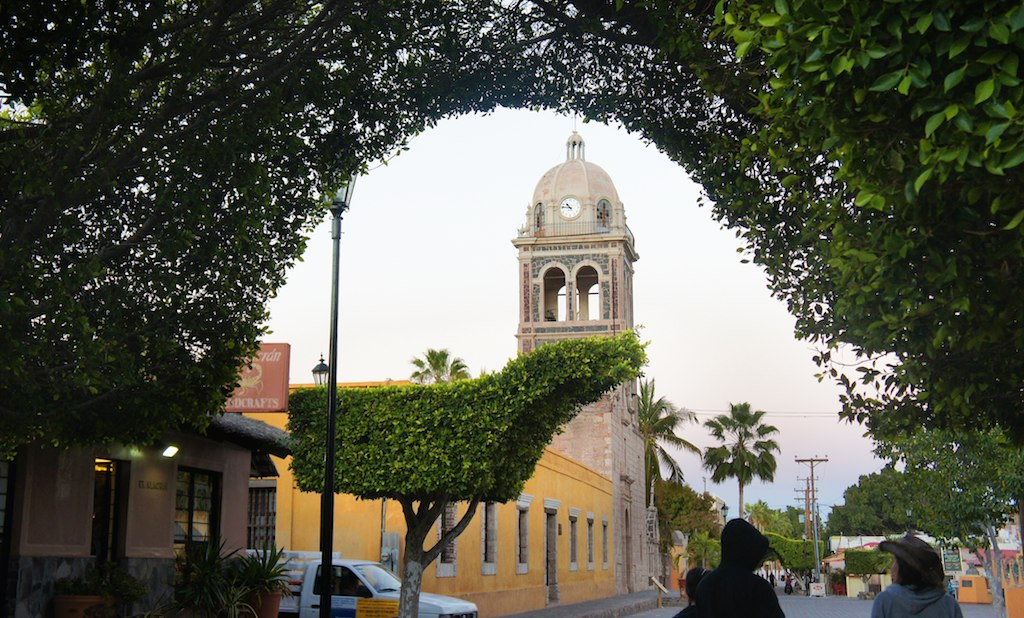
Presidio, Misión de Nuestra Señora de Loreto Conchó

- The Real Presidio de Loreto, founded in 1697 in Loreto, Baja California Sur.

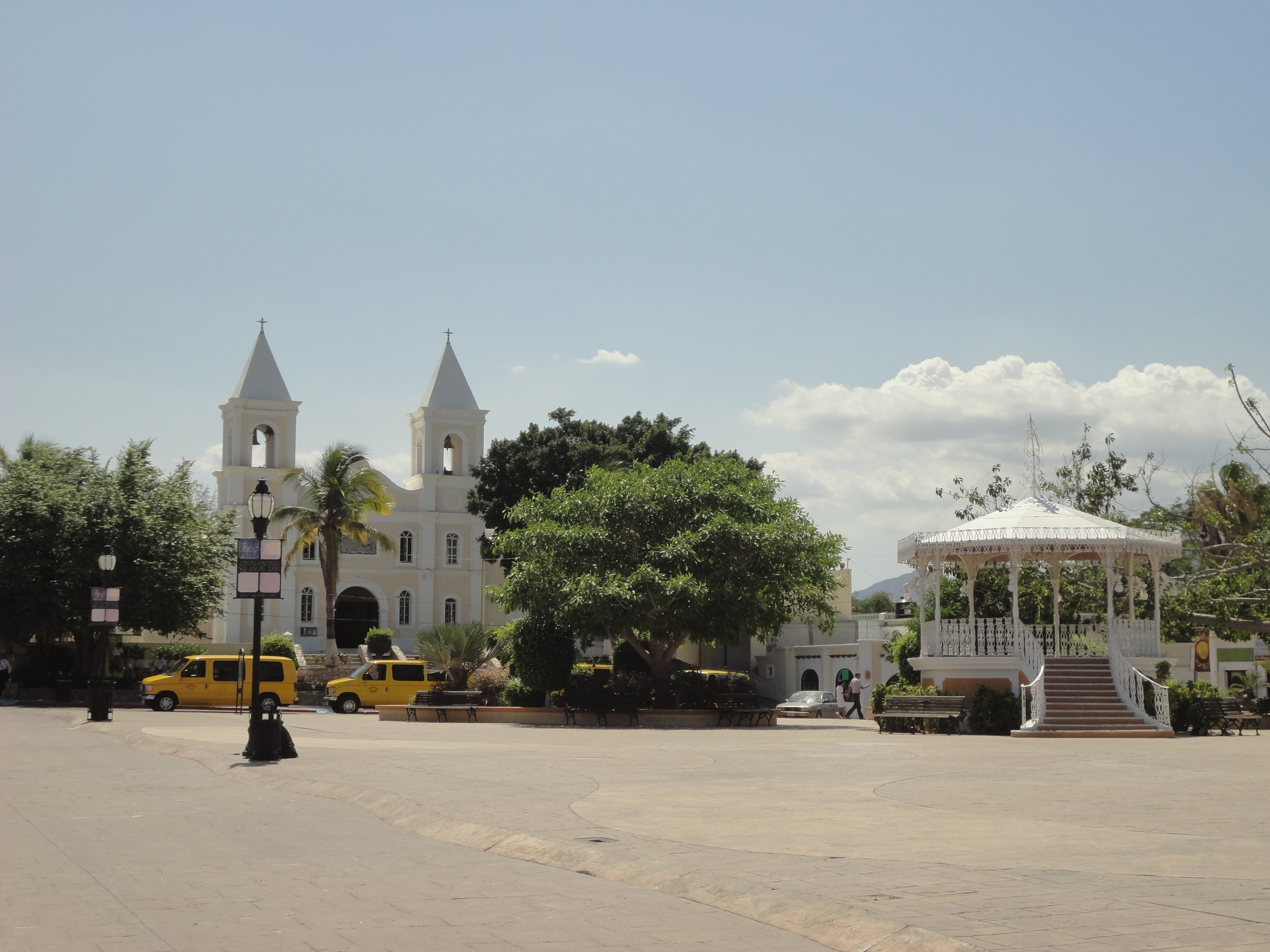
Presidio San José del Cabo

- The Presidio San José del Cabo, founded in 1735 in San José del Cabo

=== Chihuahua ===
- The Presidio de El Paso del Río Grande del Norte (1683–1773), at Ciudad Juárez, across the river from El Paso, Texas. Later relocated south in 1773 to Carrizal.
- The Presidio de San Felipe y Santiago de Janos (1691–?), in Janos.
- The Presidio de Casas Grandes (1686), was relocated to Janos in 1691.
- The Presidio de San Francisco de Conchos, founded in 1685 in San Francisco de Conchos.
- The Presidio de San Bartolomé (?–1710), located 20 km east of Parral. Replaced by flying squadron operating from the Post of Valle de San Bartolomé (1710–?).
- The Presidio de San Carlos de Cerro Gordo, founded in 1772 in Manuel Benavides.
- The Presidio de Nuestra Señora de las Caldas de Guajoquilla, founded in 1752 in Jiménez
- The Presidio de San Fernando de Carrizal (1758–?)

=== Coahuila ===
- The Presidio del Santísimo Sacramento del Valle de Santa Rosa, founded in 1780 in Santa Rosa de Múzquiz
- The Presidio San Juan Bautista del Río Grande, founded around 1703 in San Juan Bautista, now the present-day Guerrero, Coahuila
- The Presidio San Antonio Bucareli de la Babia, founded in 1774 in Cuatro Ciénegas

=== Durango ===
- The Presidio de Santa Catalina de Tepehuanes (1620–1690s?), in Santa Catarina de Tepehuanes.
- The Presidio Concepción del Pasaje de Cuencamé (1685), on Rio Nazas northwest of Cuencamé.
- The Presidio de San Pedro del Gallo (1683s), in San Pedro del Gallo.
- The Presidio de Santiago de Mapimí (1715), in Mapimí.
- The Presidio de San Miguel de Cerrogordo (1648–1767) in Villa Hidalgo.

=== Guanajuato ===
- The Presidio de San Miguel el Grande, founded in 1542 in San Miguel de Allende.
- The Presidio de León, founded in 1576 in León.
- The Presidio de Santa Fe de Guanaxuato, founded in 1576 in Guanajuato.
- The Presidio de la Purisíma Concepción de Zalaya, founded in 1570 in Celaya.
- The Presidio de León, founded in 1576 in León.
- The Hacienda San Cristóbal, founded in 1614 in San Cristóbal by the Viceroy Diego Fernández de Córdoba, now the present-day León, Guanajuato.

=== Hidalgo ===
- The Presidio de San Francisco, founded in 1522 in Zimapán

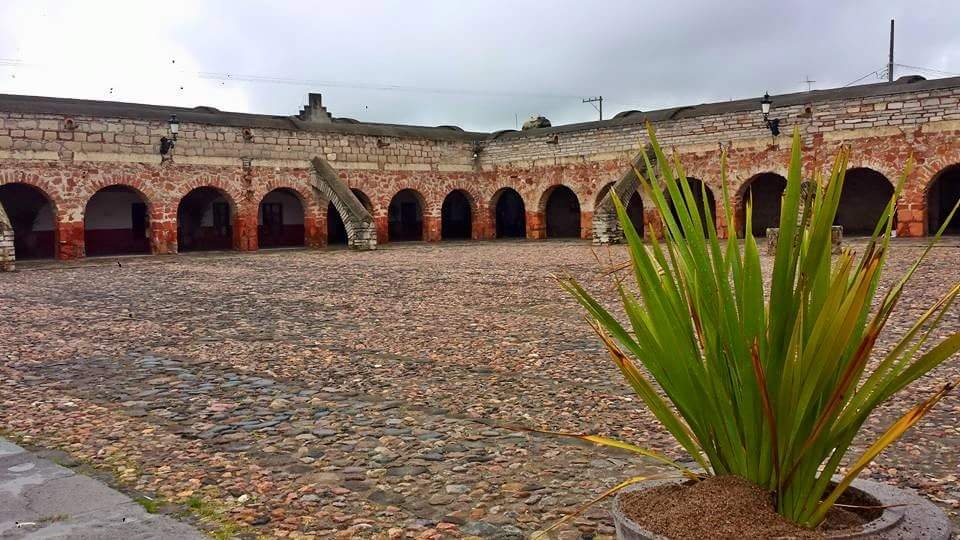
Presidio Ojuelos

=== Jalisco ===
- The Presidio Jamay, founded in 1529.
- The Presidio Ojuelos, founded in 1570, which developed into the city of Ojuelos.
- The Presidio de Santa María de los Lagos, founded in 1563 in Lagos de Moreno.
- El Fuerte de la Isla, founded in 1817 in Mezcala Island.

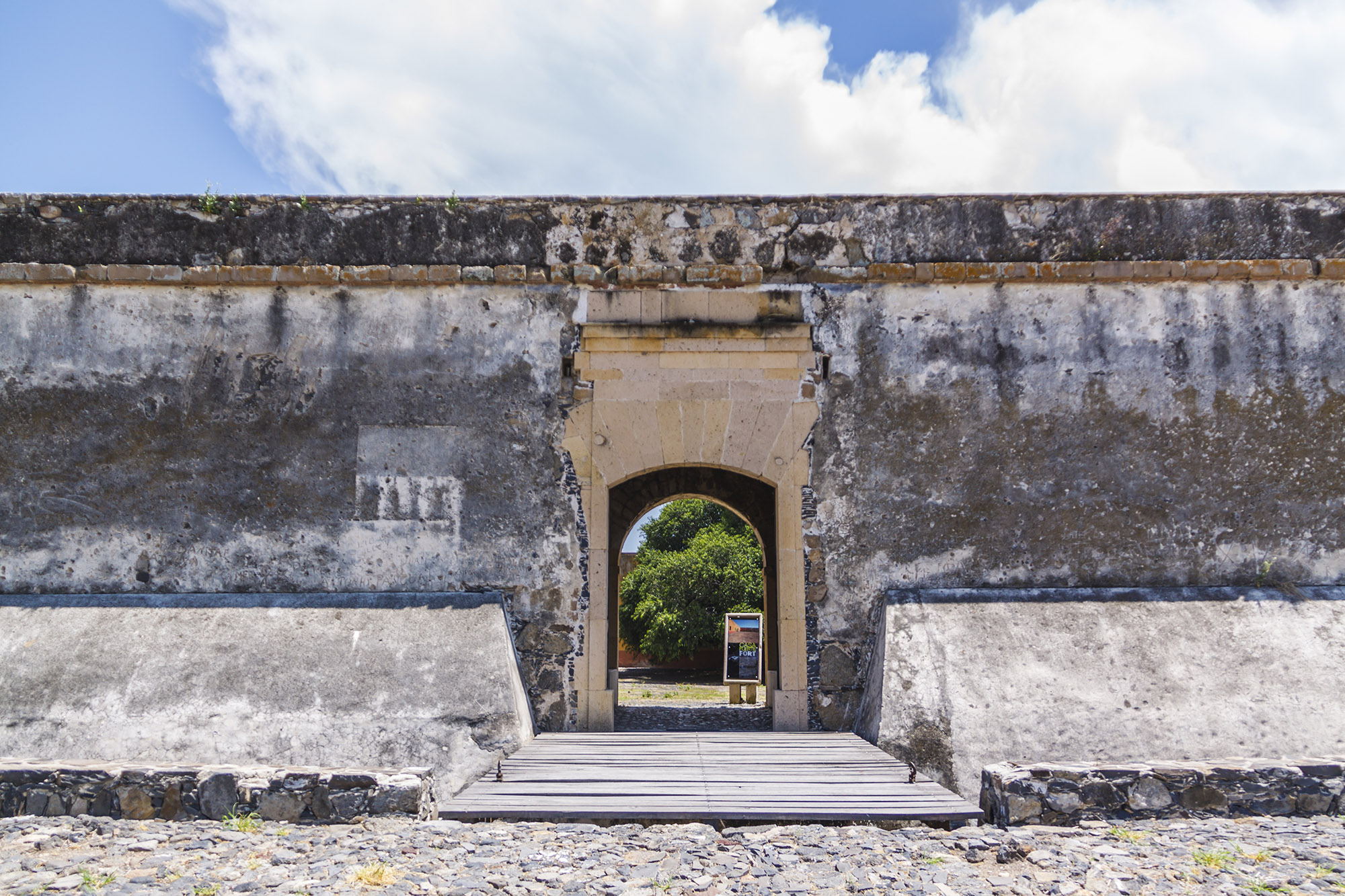
Presidio, Mezcala Island

=== Nuevo León ===
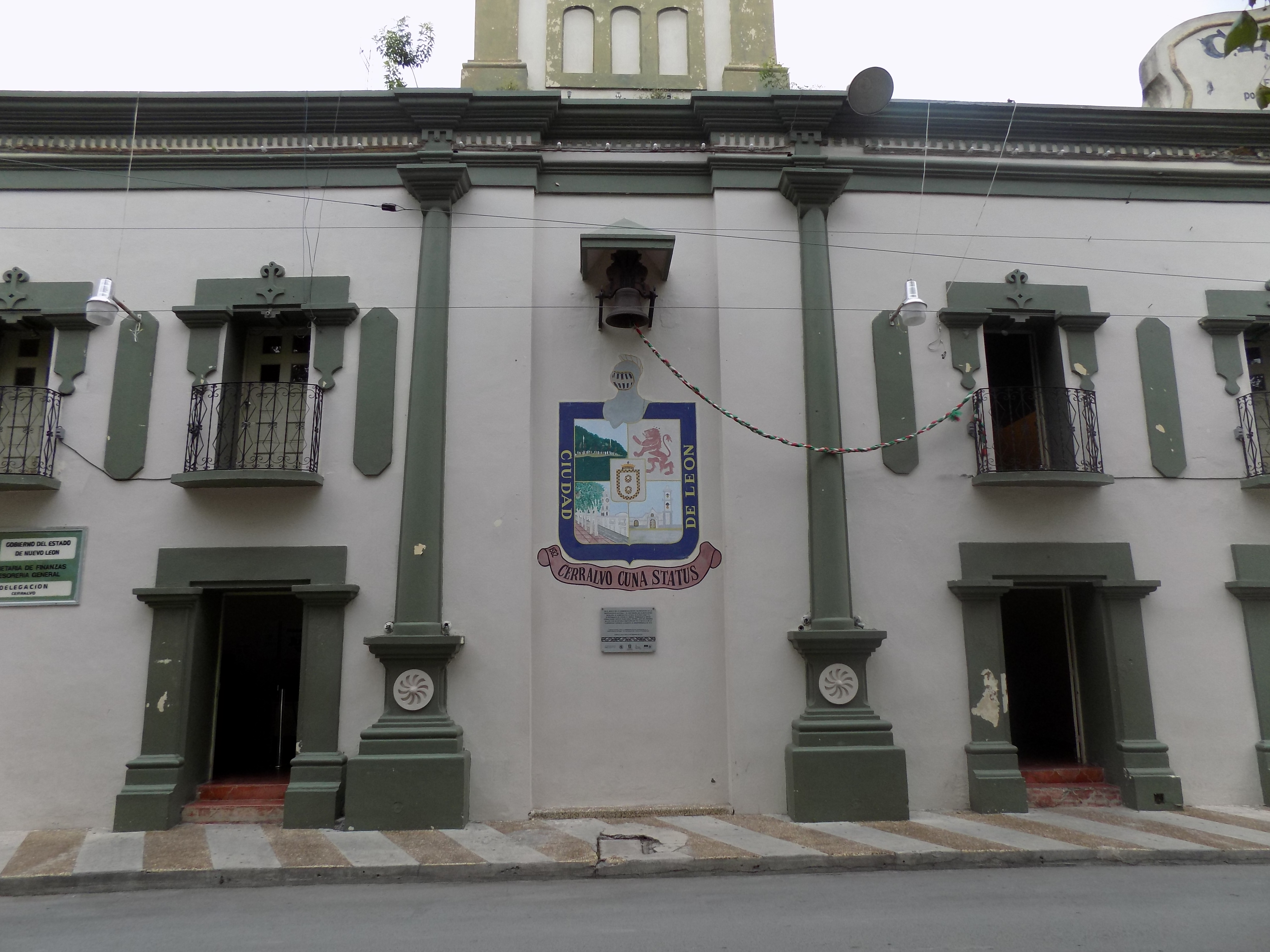
Former Presidio San Gregorio de Cerralvo reconverted into the town hall

- The Presidio San Gregorio de Cerralvo, founded in 1626 in Cerralvo.

=== Querétaro ===
- The Presidio de San Juan Bautista del Río, founded in 1531 in San Juan del Río
- The Presidio Maxcala, founded in 1566 by the Otomi with Spanish Royal Writ to protect the Ruta de la Plata in Pedro Escobedo
- The Presidio Jalpan, founded in 1751 in Jalpan de Serra

=== San Luis Potosí ===
- The Presidio de Santiago de Los Valles de Oxitipa, founded in 1533 in Ciudad Valles

=== Sonora ===
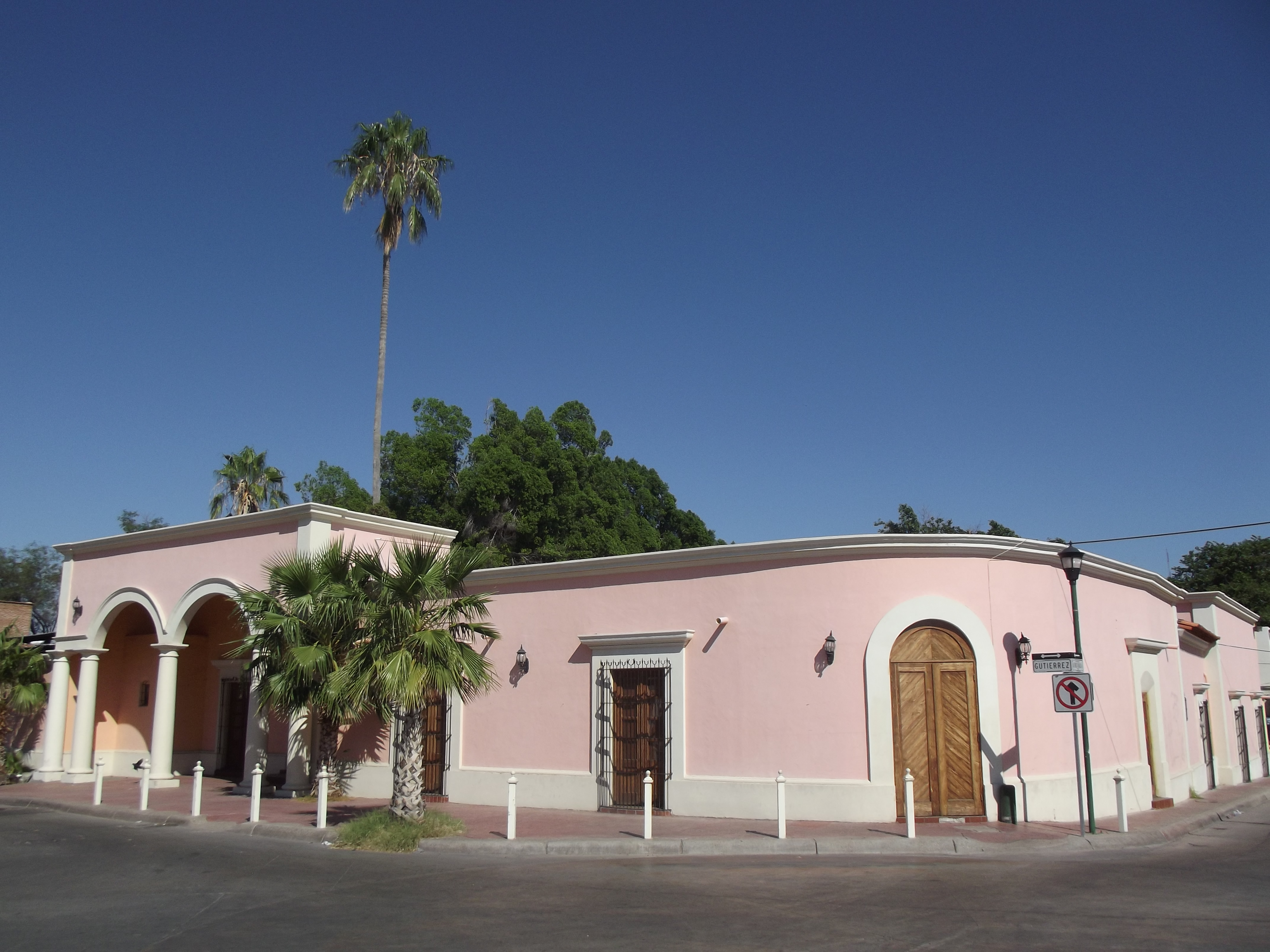
Former Hermosillo, Sonora town hall, that was the Presidio de San Pedro de la Conquista

- The Presidio de San Pedro de la Conquista, founded in 1726 in Hermosillo. Today the former Hermosillo Townhall museum.
- The Presidio Santa Gertrudis del Altar, founded in 1755 in Altar, Sonora
- The Presidio de Santa Rosa de Corodéguachi, founded in 1692, near the Sonora/Arizona border and later moved to Fronteras, Sonora
- The Presidio San Miguel de Horcasitas, founded in 1749

=== Zacatecas ===
- The Presidio Tlaltenango, founded in 1530 in Tlaltenango.
- The Presidio Xuchipilan, founded in 1530 in Juchipila.
- The Presidio de Espíritu Santo de Guadalajara (1532–1533) near the present-day Nochistlán, destroyed by the Tlaltenango Caxcan in 1533.

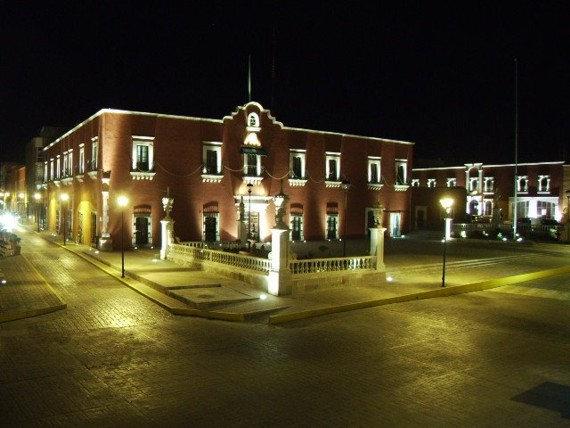
Former Presidio de Fresnillo reconverted into the city hall

- The Presidio de Fresnillo, founded in 1554 in Fresnillo.
- The Presidio de Jerez de la Frontera, founded in 1570 in Jerez de García Salinas.
- The Presidio Palmillas (1570–?), near the present-day Ojocaliente.
- The Presidio Malpaso, founded reconverting an estancia in 1580 in Villanueva. Today the former hacienda de Malpaso.
- The Presidio de San Pedro de Chalchihuites, founded in 1591 in Chalchihuites.
- The Presidio de Sacramento y Real de Minas de Ojocaliente de Bastidas, founded in 1620 in Ojocaliente.

== North Africa ==
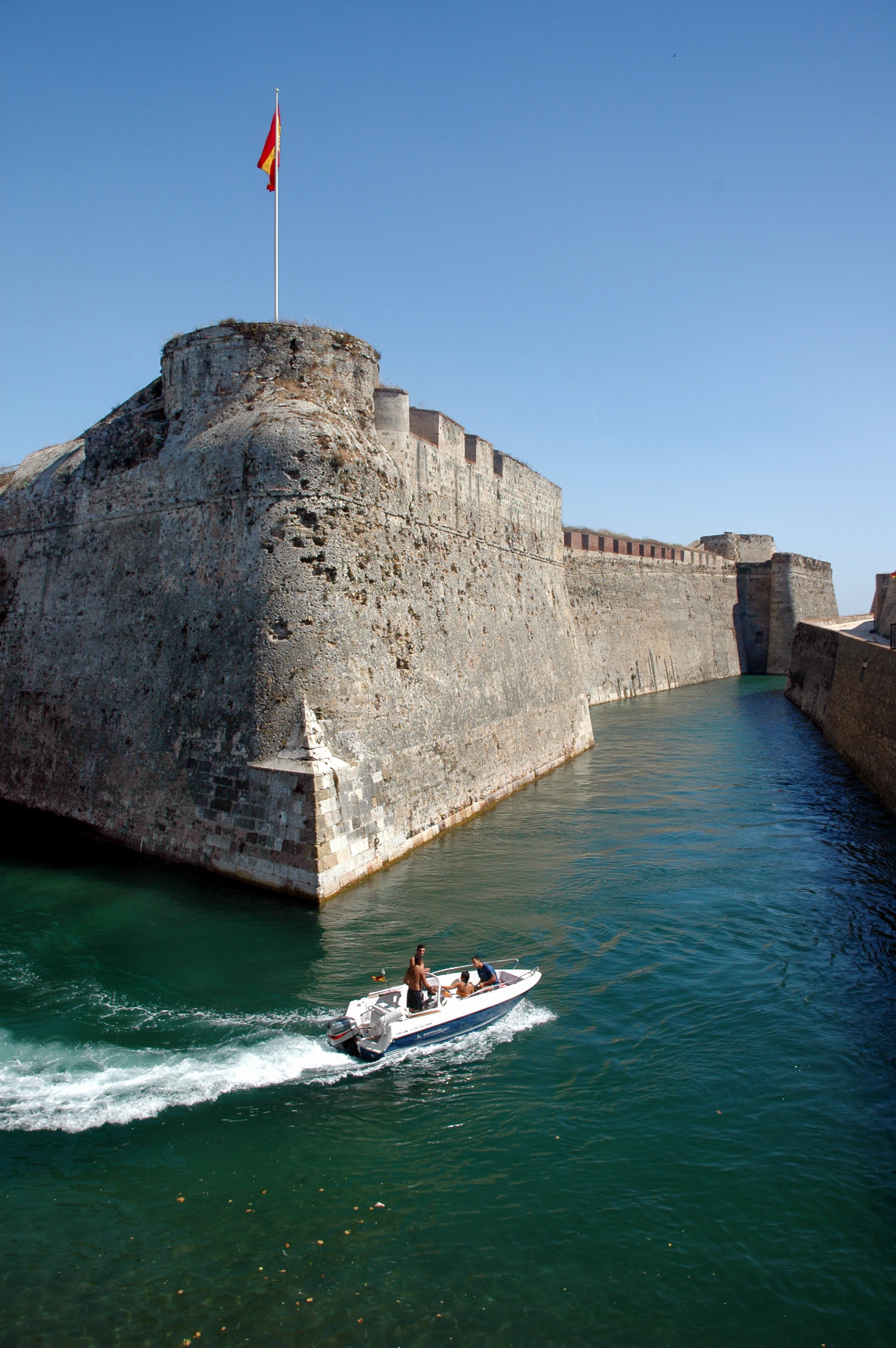
Royal Walls of Ceuta

After the Granada War and the completion of the Spanish Reconquista, the Catholic Monarchs took their fight across the Strait of Gibraltar, as the Portuguese had done several generations earlier with the conquest of Ceuta in 1415. The establishment of Spanish military outposts on the North African coast echoed earlier endeavors by the Kingdom of Sicily in the 12th century (and again in Djerba under Frederick III of Sicily) and the Kingdom of France in the 13th century (Eighth Crusade of 1270). During the period of Iberian Union between 1580 and 1640, the Spanish Crown gained Ceuta and the Portuguese outposts on the Atlantic Coast, such as Tangier, Mazagão/El Jadida and Casablanca; but of these, it only retained Ceuta by the Treaty of Lisbon (1668).

The Spanish North African presidios are listed here in geographical sequence, from West to East, and including neither Spain's Atlantic settlements in the Moroccan far South (e.g. Santa Cruz de la Mar Pequeña) nor outposts gained after 1830 (e.g. the Chafarinas Islands).

- Mehdya, Morocco (La Mamora or San Miguel de Ultramar), 1614–1681
- Larache, 1610–1689
- Ceuta, acquired from Portugal in 1668
- Peñón de Vélez de la Gomera, 1508–1522 and since 1564
- Alhucemas Islands, since 1559
- Cazaza, 1505–1533
- Melilla, since 1497
- Honaine, briefly in 1534
- Mers El Kébir (Mazalquivir), 1505–1708 and 1732–1792
- Oran, 1509–1708 and 1732–1792
- Algiers (Argel), 1510–1516; Peñón islet until 1529
- Béjaïa (Bugia), 1510–1555
- Annaba (Bona), 1535–1540
- Bizerte (Bizerta), 1535–1574
- La Goulette (La Goleta), 1535–1574
- Tunis (Túnez), 1573–1574 (protectorate from 1535 to 1569)
- Sousse (Susa), 1537–1574
- Monastir, 1550–1554
- Mahdia (Mahdía), 1550–1553
- Djerba (Yerba), 1521–1523 and 1551–1560
- Tripoli (Trípoli), 1510–1530 then granted to the Knights Hospitaller who held it until 1551
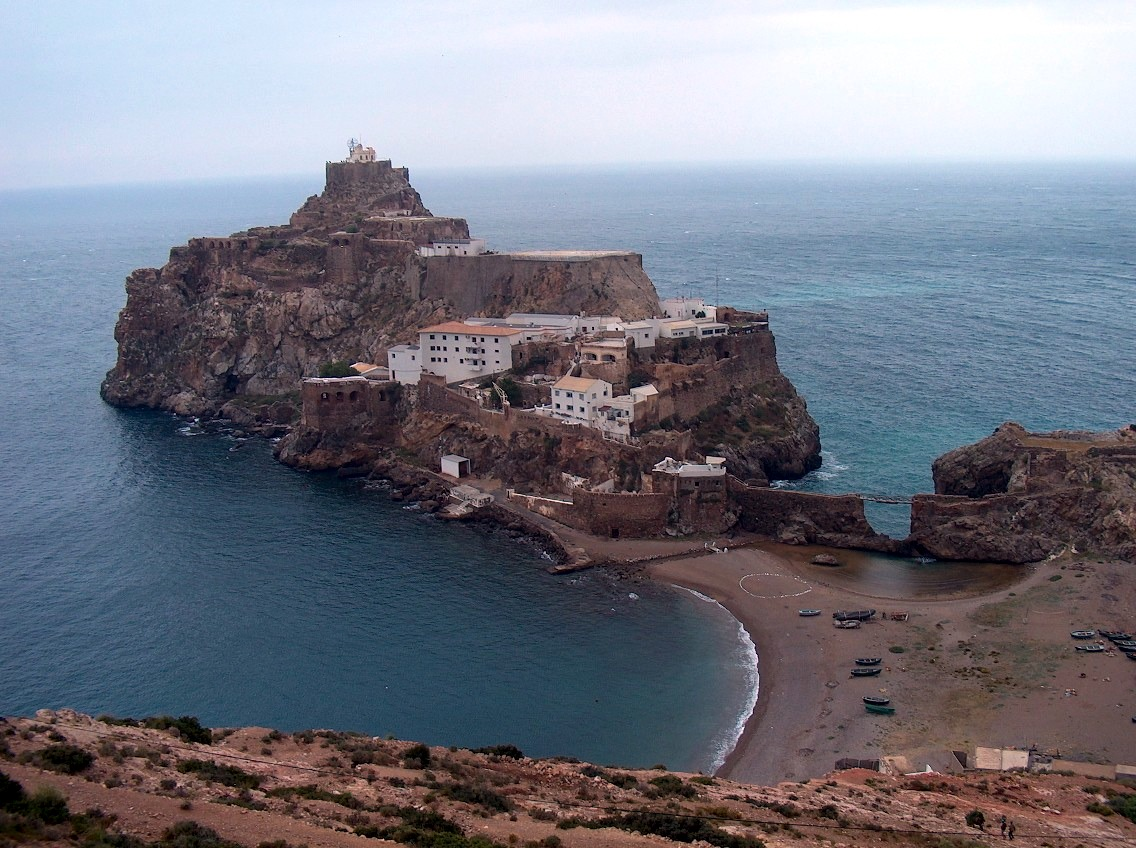
Vélez de la Gomera

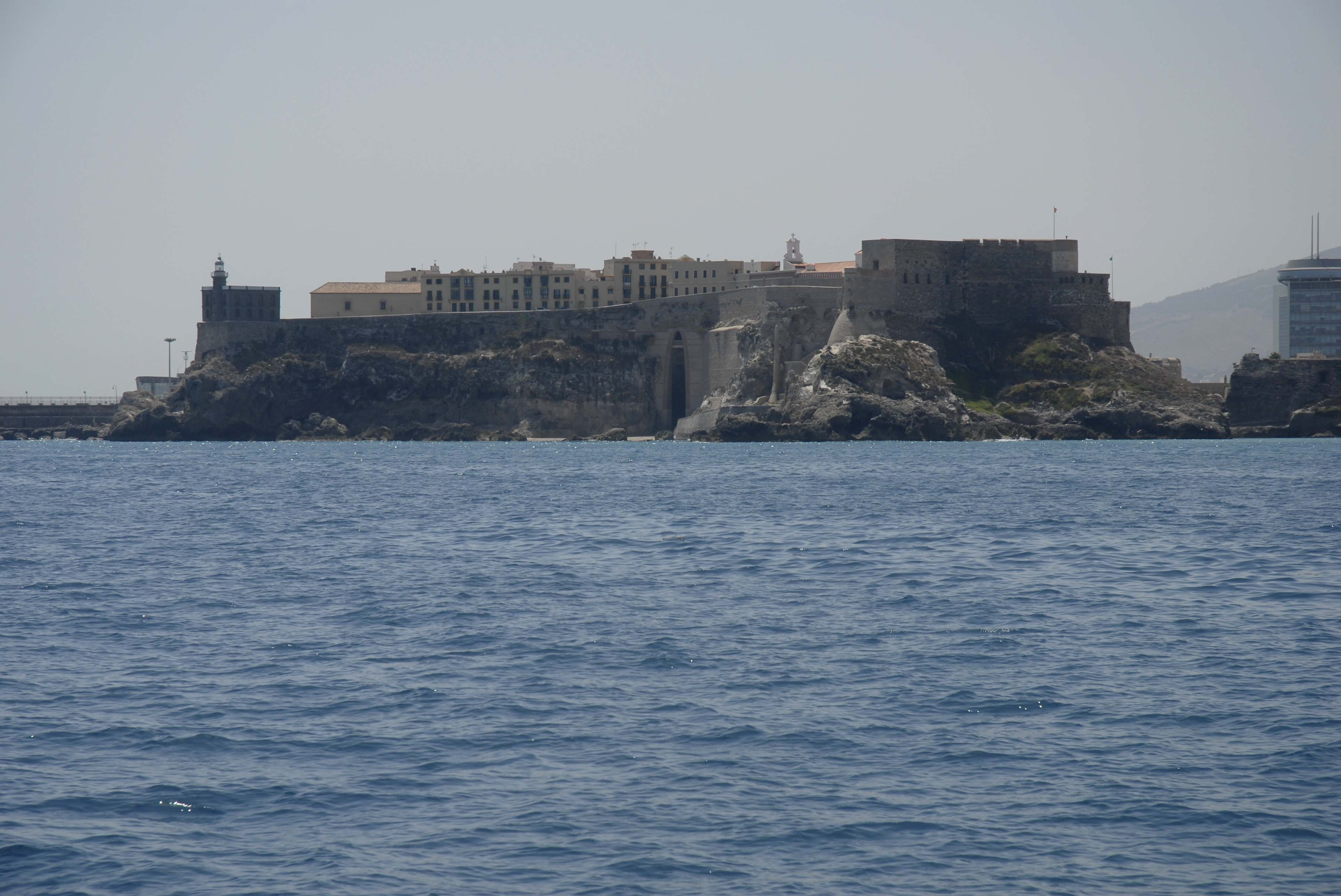
Melilla

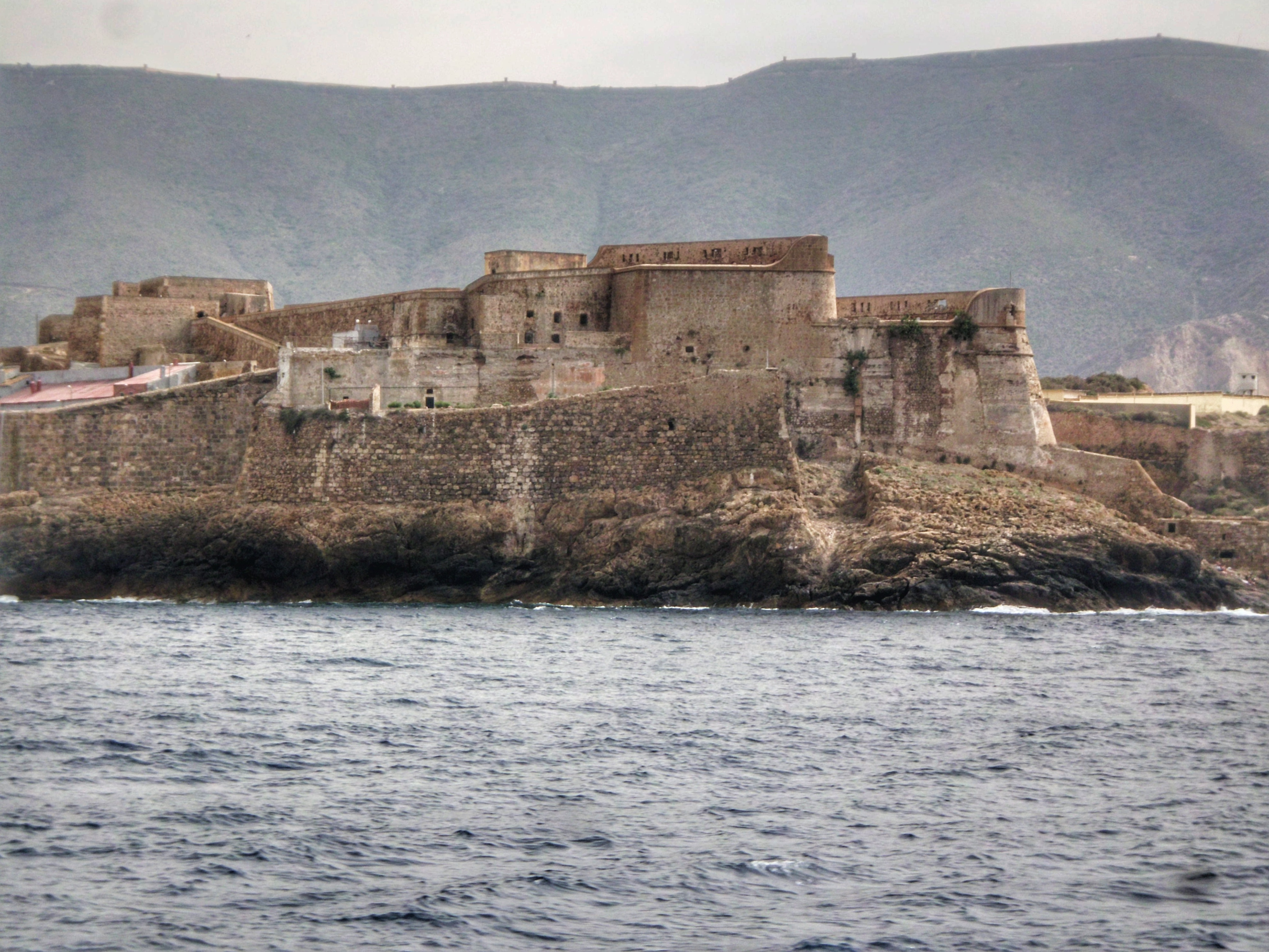
Mers El Kébir

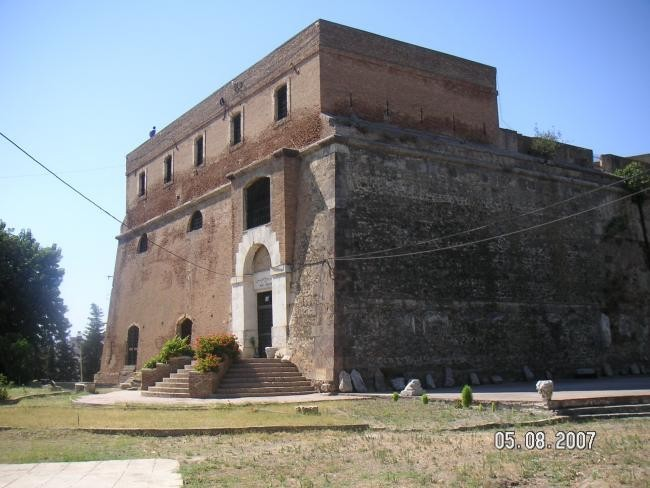
Spanish fort (Bordj Moussa) in Béjaïa

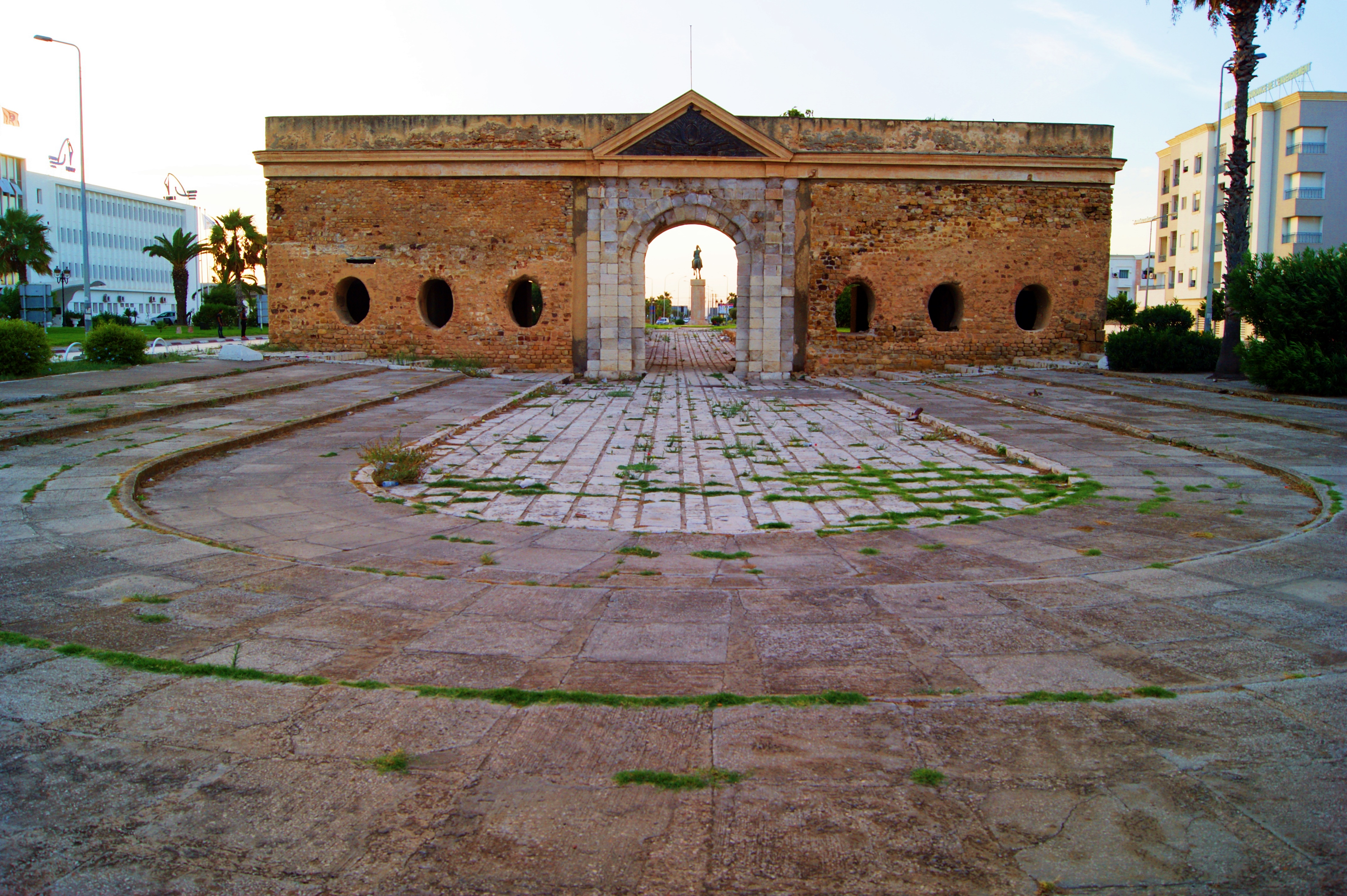
La Goulette

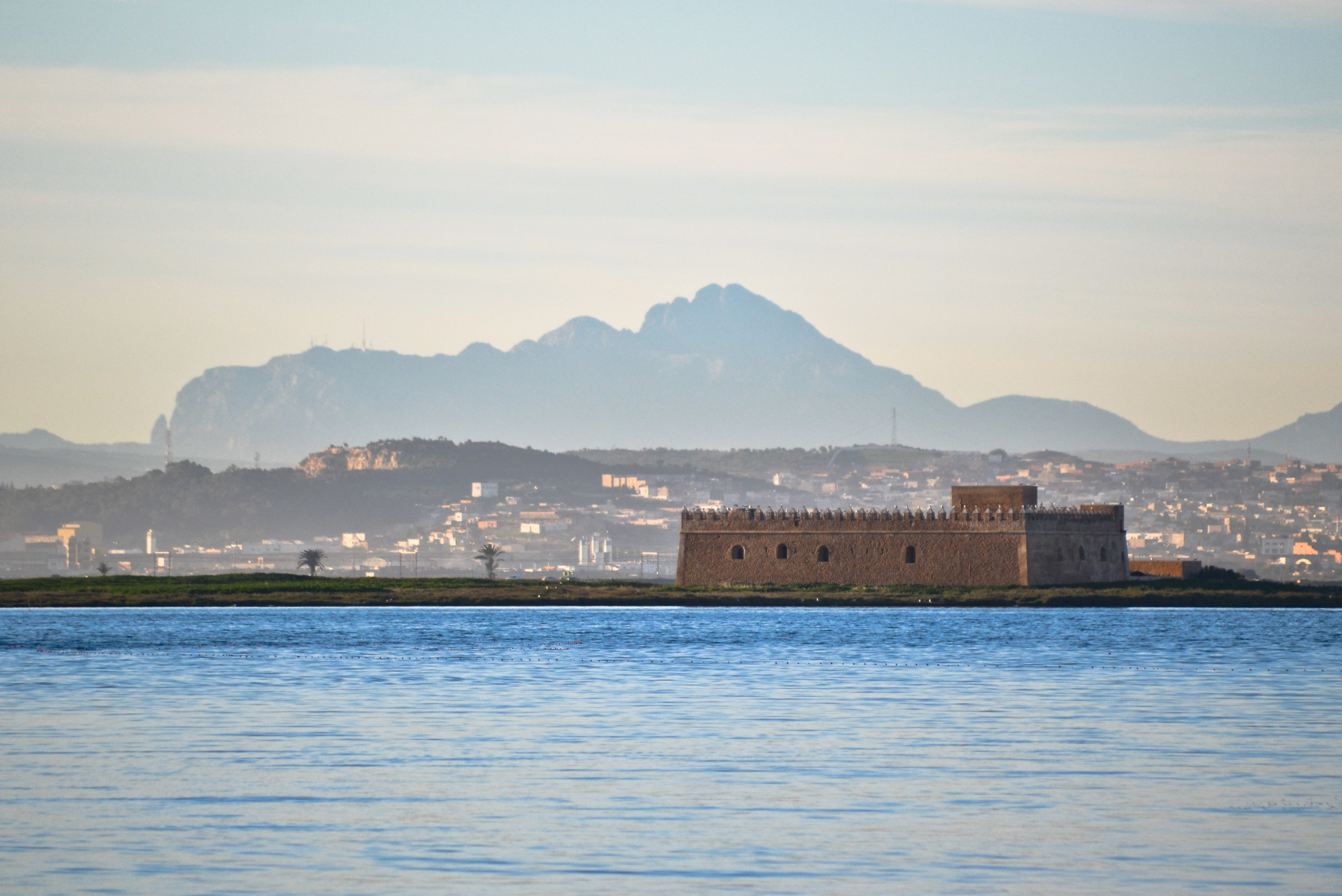
Spanish fort of Chikly Island on the Lake of Tunis

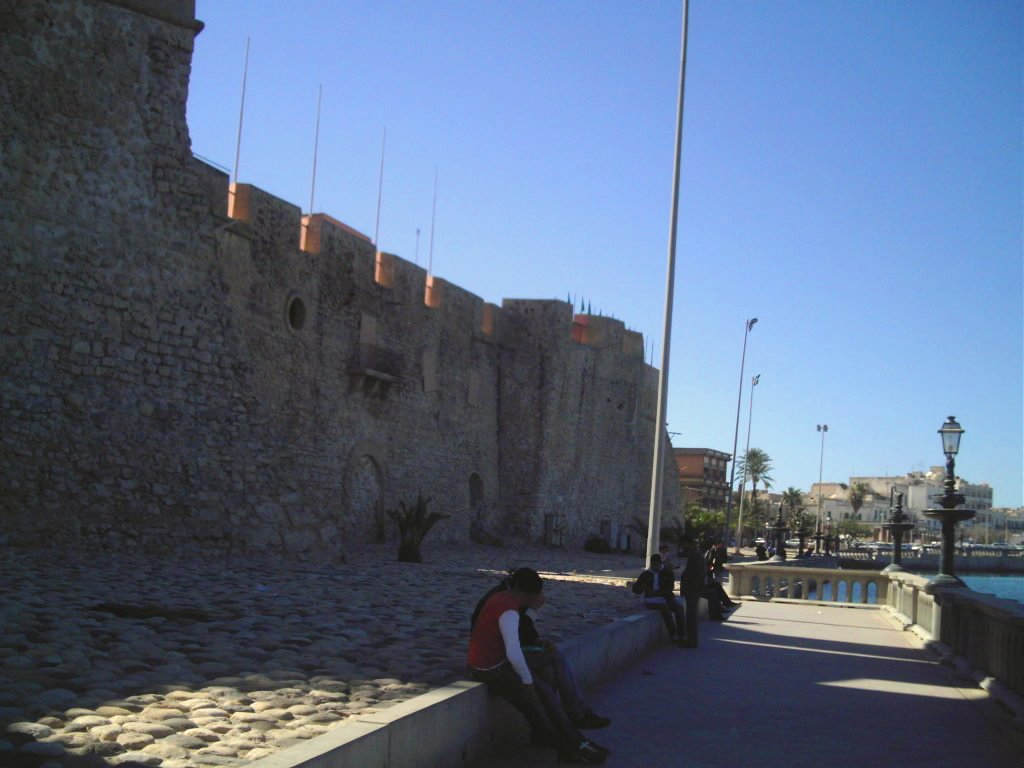
Red Castle of Tripoli

== Philippines ==
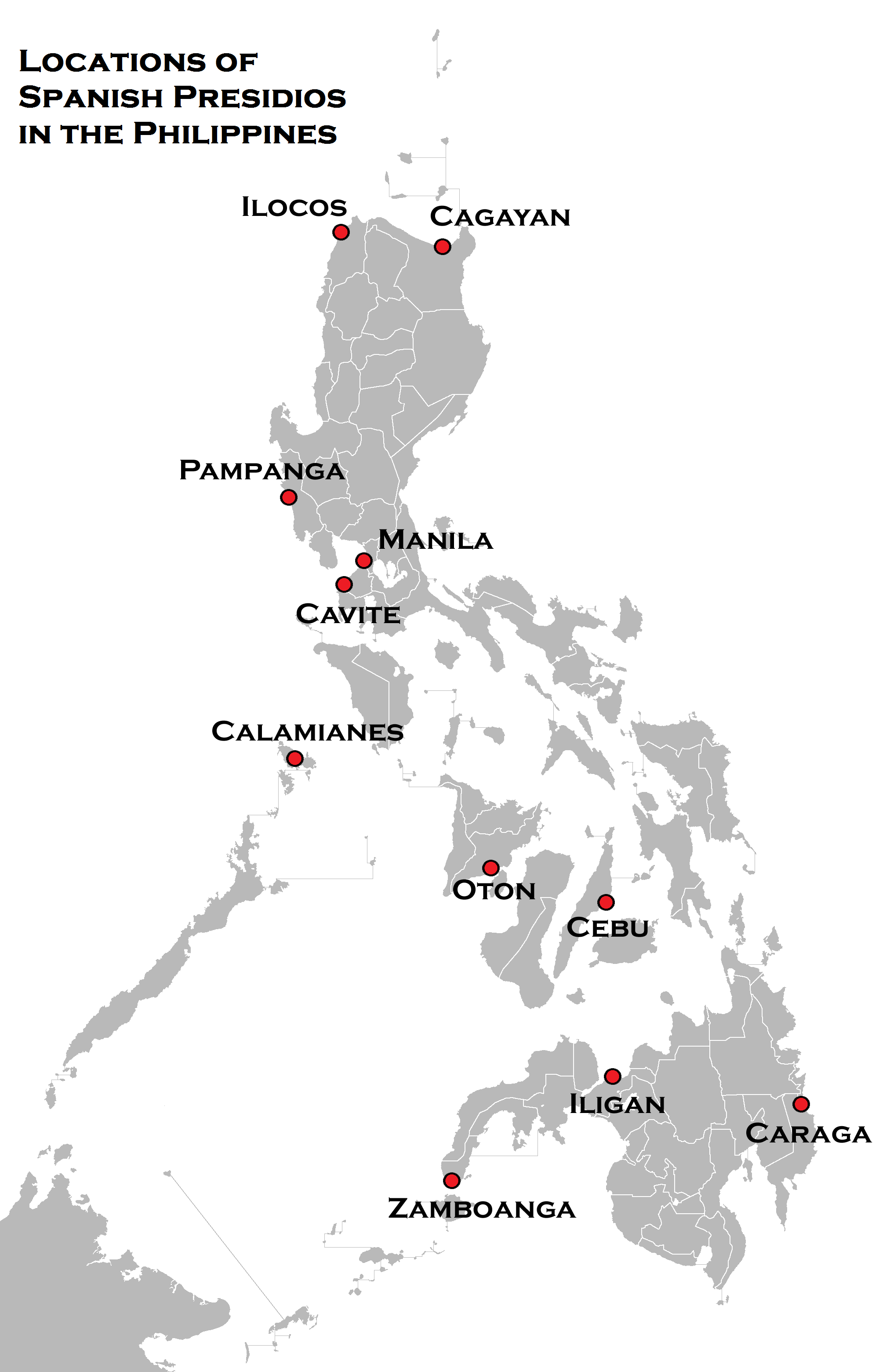
Map of the Presidios built in the Philippines during the 1600s, in Fortress of Empire by Rene Javellana, S. J. (1997)

=== Luzon ===
- The Presidio de Santiago, founded in 1593 in Intramuros, Manila
- The Presidio de San Felipe (Cavite), founded in 1609 in San Roque, Cavite

=== Mindanao ===
- The Presidio de Nuestra Señora del Pilar de Zaragoza, founded in 1635 in Zamboanga

=== Visayas ===
- The Presidio de Lawis in Madridejos, Cebu, the current structure is the oldest in the country laid down around 1628–1630
- The Presidio (Fort) de San Pedro (Iloilo), founded in 1616 in Iloilo City
- The Presidio de San Pedro (Cebu), founded in 1630 in Cebu

== United States ==
=== Arizona ===
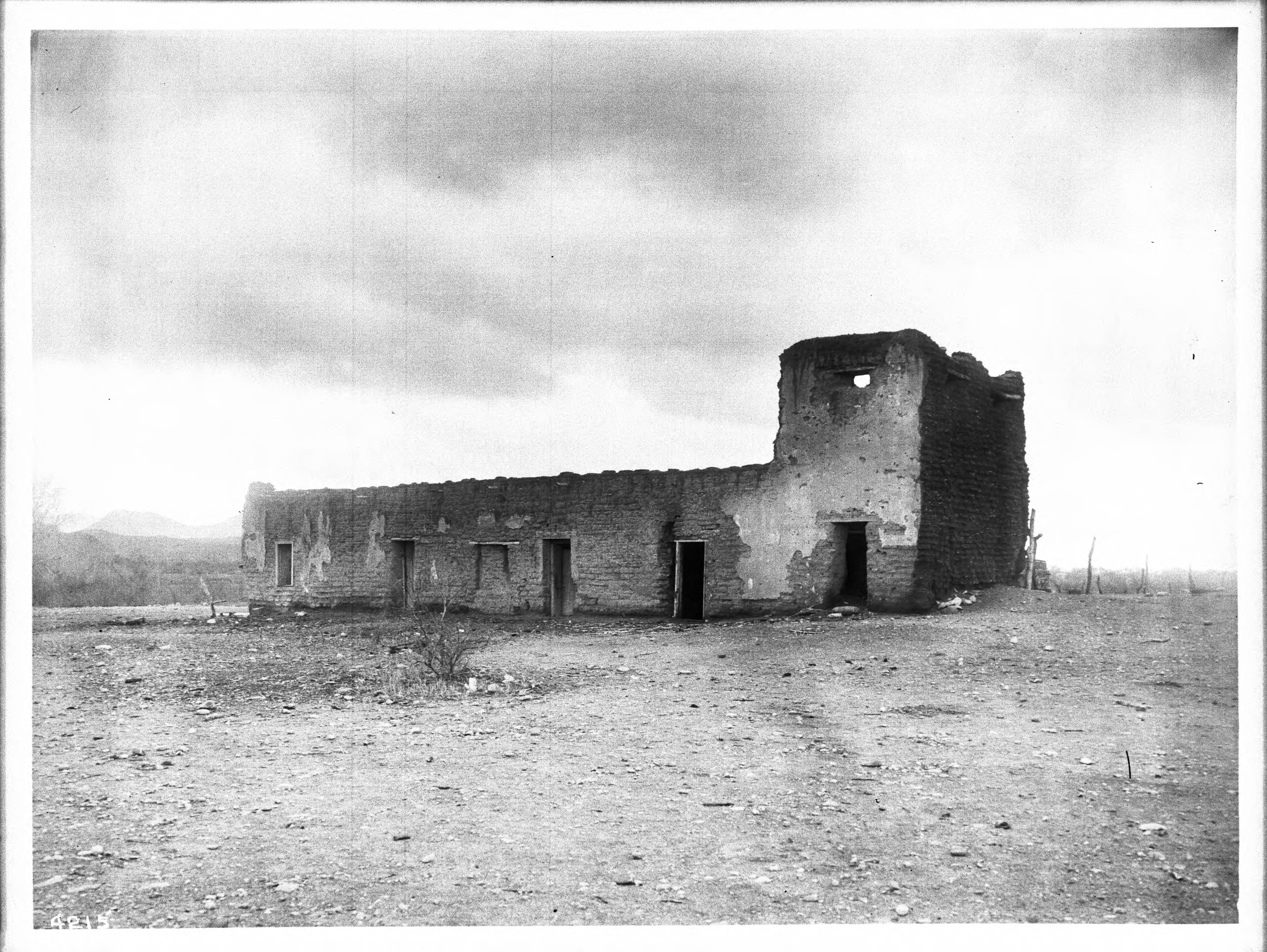
Presidio San Ignacio de Tubac, Arizona

- The Presidio San Ignacio de Tubac, founded in 1752 in Tubac
- The Presidio San Augustin del Tucson, founded in 1775 in Tucson
- The Presidio Santa Cruz de Terrenate, founded in 1775 near the present-day Tombstone
- The Presidio de Calabasas, founded in 1837 near the present-day Tumacacori
- The Presidio de San Bernardino, founded in 1776 near the present-day Douglas (Gerald 1968)
- The Presidio San Felipe de Gracia Real de Terrenate

=== California ===
- The Presidio Real de San Carlos de Monterey, founded in 1770. Its rancho del rey was what became Rancho Nacional. It is currently housing the Defense Language Institute, in Monterey
- The Presidio Real de San Diego, founded in 1769 in San Diego, its rancho del rey was what became Rancho de la Nación.
- The Presidio Real de San Francisco, founded in 1776 and now part of the Golden Gate National Recreation Area in San Francisco. Its rancho del rey was what became Rancho Buri Buri.
- The Presidio Real de Santa Bárbara, founded in 1782 in Santa Barbara. Its rancho del rey was what became Rancho San Julian.
- The Presidio de Sonoma, founded by Mexico in 1836 in Sonoma. Its rancho nacional was what became Rancho Suscol.
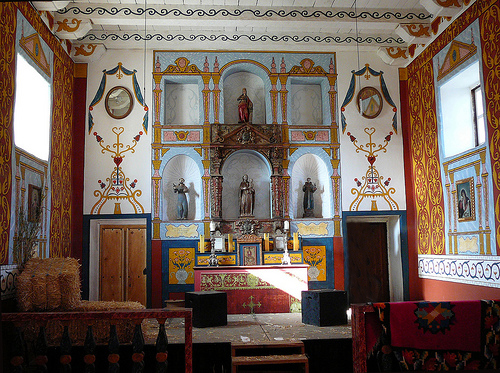
Interior of the reconstructed chapel of the Santa Barbara Presidio

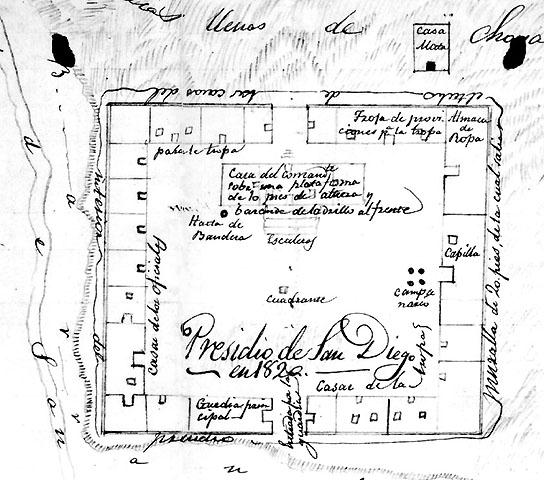
Presidio of San Diego, California

=== Florida ===
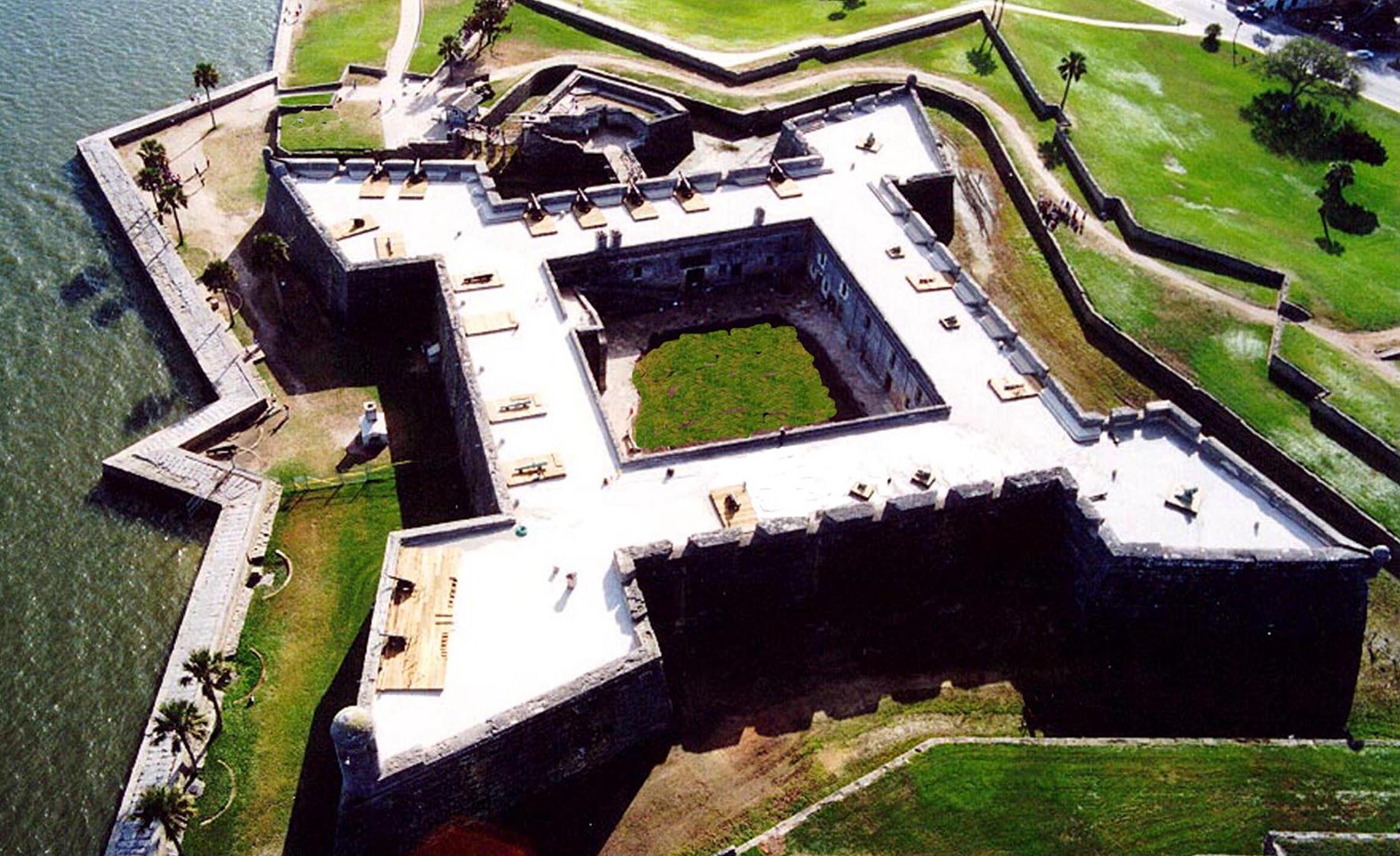
Castillo de San Marcos, completed 1695, last of several forts at Presidio San Augustin

- The Presidio San Augustin, founded in 1565, which developed into the city of St. Augustine, ceded to Great Britain in 1763, regained 20 years later, and transferred to the United States in 1821
- The Presidio San Mateo, founded in 1565 on the ruins of Fort Caroline near today's Jacksonville, recaptured and destroyed by the French in 1568
- The Presidio Ais, founded in 1565 on the Indian River Lagoon, abandoned after one month
- The Presidio Santa Lucia, founded in 1565 near Cape Canaveral, abandoned four months later
- The Presidio San Antonio de Padua, founded in 1566 at Calos, capital of the Calusa, abandoned in 1569
- The Presidio Tocobaga, founded in 1567 on Tampa Bay, destroyed by the Tocobagas within ten months
- The Presidio Tequesta, founded in 1567 on the site of what is now Miami, abandoned in 1568

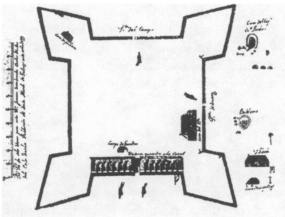
1699 plan of wooden Fort San Carlos de Austria at Presidio Santa Maria de Galve

- The Presidio Santa Maria de Galve, founded in 1696, near Fort Barrancas at present-day Naval Air Station Pensacola; captured by French in 1719, Spanish relocated to Presidio Bahía San José de Nueva Asturias (see below)
- The Presidio Bahía San José de Valladares, founded in 1701 on St. Joseph Bay, captured by French in 1718
- The Presidio San Marcos de Apalachee, founded in 1718 at the existing port of San Marcos, which developed into the town of St. Marks, ceded to Great Britain in 1763, regained 20 years later, and transferred to the United States in 1821
- The Presidio Bahía San José de Nueva Asturias, founded in 1719 on St. Joseph Point, abandoned when Spanish regained Pensacola Bay area from French in 1722, Spanish relocated to Presidio Isla Santa Rosa Punta de Siguenza (see below)
- The Presidio Isla Santa Rosa Punta de Siguenza, founded in 1722 on Santa Rosa Island, destroyed by a hurricane in 1755, Spanish relocated to Presidio San Miguel de Panzacola (see below)
- The Presidio San Miguel de Panzacola, founded in 1755, which developed into the city of Pensacola, ceded to Great Britain in 1763, regained 20 years later, and transferred to the United States in 1821

=== Georgia ===
- The Presidio Guale, founded in 1566, abandoned three months later
- The Presidio San Pedro de Tacatacuru, founded in 1569 on Cumberland Island, abandoned in 1573

=== Louisiana ===
- The Presidio Nuestra Señora del Pilar de los Adaes, founded in 1721 near the present-day Robeline

=== New Mexico ===
Presidio Santa Cruz de la Cañada, New Mexico

- The Presidio Santa Cruz de la Cañada, in Santa Cruz

=== South Carolina ===
- The Presidio Santa Elena, founded in 1566 on Parris Island, destroyed by Native Americans in 1576, re-established in 1577, abandoned in 1587

=== Texas ===
- The Presidio Fuerte de Santa Cruz del Cibolo, founded in 1734 and re-established in 1771 near Cestohowa, Texas in Karnes County, Texas, (between San Antonio and Goliad).
- The Presidio San Antonio de Béxar, founded in 1718 in San Antonio
- The Presidio Nuestra Señora de Loreto, founded in 1721, near Lavaca Bay, now in Goliad
- The Presidio San Luis de las Amarillas San Saba, founded in April 1757 near the present-day Menard
- The Presidio de la Junta de los Ríos Norte y Conchos, founded in 1760 just southwest of present-day Presidio

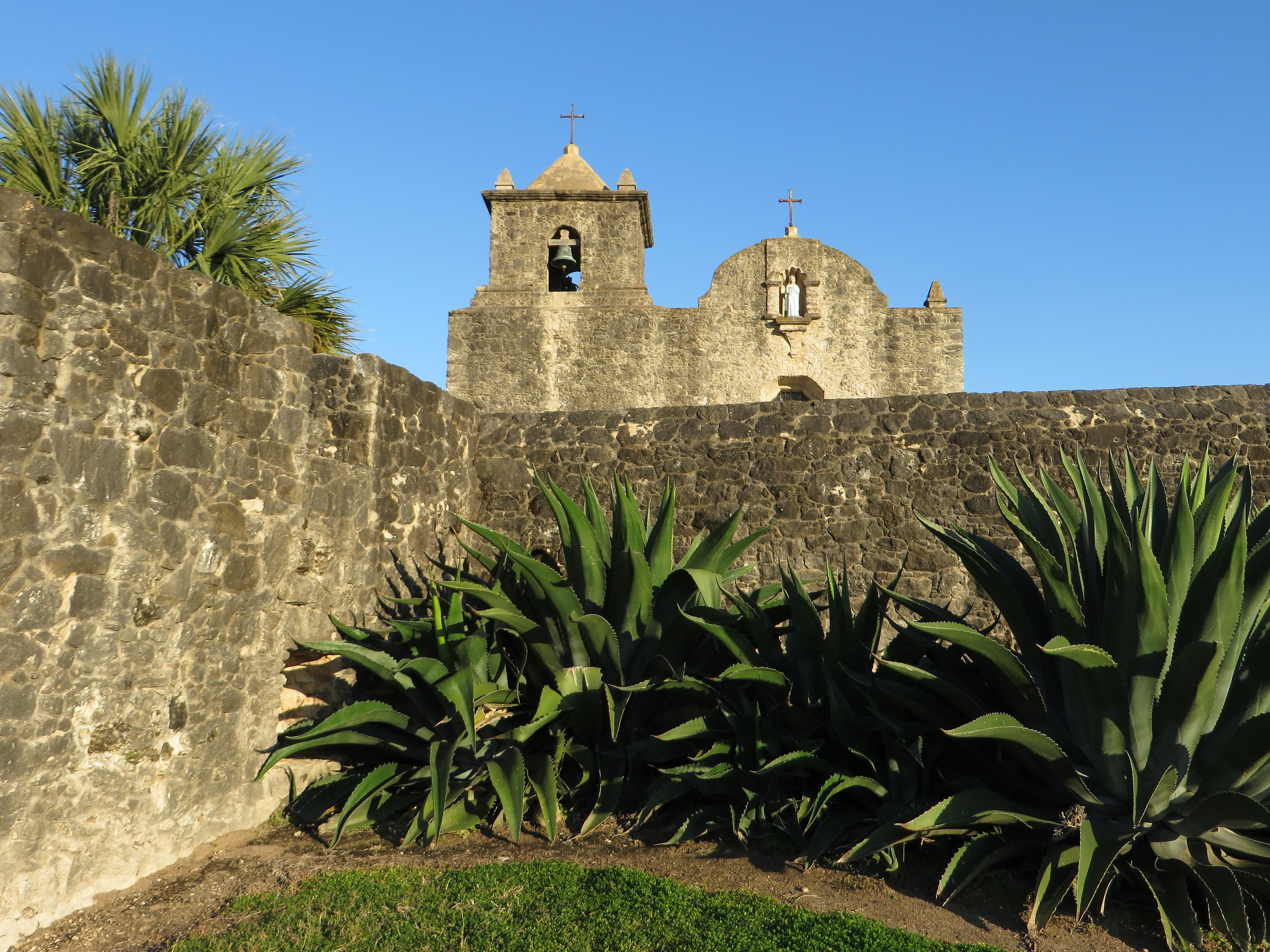
Presidio La Bahía in Goliad

== See also ==
- Lists of Spanish colonial missions of the Roman Catholic Church in the Americas
- Marqués de Rubí
- Spanish colonial pueblos and villas in North America

== References and further reading ==
- Gerald, Rex E. (1968). Spanish Presidios of the Late Eighteenth Century in Northern New Spain. Santa Fe, NM: Museum of New Mexico Press.
- Javellana, Rene, S. J. Fortress of Empire. Ateneo de Manila University Press, 1997.
- Moorhead, Max L. The Presidio: Bastion of the Spanish Borderlands. Norman: University of Oklahoma Press, 1975.
- Williams, J. S. "Appendix: Presidios of Northern New Spain". Historical Archaeology 38, 2004.
