= The Girl from Carthage =

1924 film

- Restored version of the film
- Directed by: Albert Samama Chikly
- Starring: Hayde Chikly; Ahmed Dziri; Abdelgassen Ben Taleb; Hadj Hadi Dehali
- Release date: 1924
- Country: Tunisia
- Language: Arabic

The Girl from Carthage (also known as La fille de Carthage) is a 1924 Tunisian film written by Haydée Tamzali and directed by Albert Samama Chikly. This film has music composed by Mark Smythe. The film stars Hayde Chikly, Ahmed Dziri, Abdelgassen Ben Taleb and Hadj Hadi Dehali in the lead roles.

== Cast ==
- Hayde Chikly
- Ahmed Dziri
- Abdelgassen Ben Taleb
- Hadj Hadi Dehali
