= Albert Samama Chikly =

Tunisian filmmaker and photographer

- ألبير شمامة شيكلي
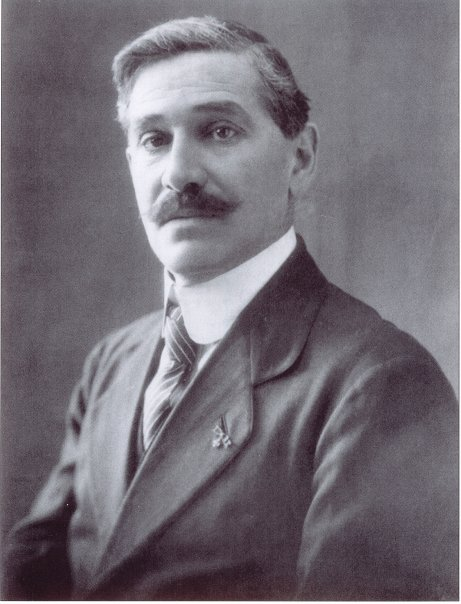
- Born: Albert Samama; 24 January 1872; Tunis, Tunisia
- Died: 28 December 1934 (aged 62); Tunis, Tunisia
- Resting place: Borgel cemetery
- Occupations: Director, photographer, technophile, adventurer, cyclist
- Years active: 1897–1934
- Spouse: Bianca Ferrero
- Children: Haydée Tamzali
- Father: David Samama

Albert Samama Chikly (24 January 1872 – 28 December 1934), was a Tunisian filmmaker and photographer. Considered one of the earliest pillars in World Cinema, Albert was a photographer, filmmaker, technophile, adventurer, and cyclist.

== Personal life and Death ==
He was born on 24 January 1872 in Tunis, Tunisia to a wealthy Tunisian Jewish family. His father David Samama, was a banker of the Bey who established a banking institution that later become the Bank of Tunisia. His mother was a housewife. Albert continued his studies with Charles Lavigerie and then with the Jesuits in Marseille. He was a traveler that traveled to Cape Horn, China and Australia frequently even at young age. He received his nickname 'Chikli' from the brotherhood of firefighters of the island of Chikly, a small island on Lake Tunis.

He was married to Bianca Ferrero, an Italian-born woman from Savoy, who was a musician. The couple had one daughter Haydée Tamzali. He later acquired French nationality.

Albert died in 1934 in Tunis at the age of 62 and buried in the Jewish cemetery called the Borgel.

== Career ==
In 1896, Albert returned to Tunisia and took the first cinematographic images with the help of photographer Soler. Accompanying the exhibition of Auguste and Louis Lumière, he broadcasts the films The Exit from the Lumière factory in Lyon and The Arrival of a train at La Ciotat station. He continued to study the science and techniques of photography and cinematography and became the first person to introduce the bicycle and wireless telegraph in Tunisia. Later he introduced first X-ray machine in a Tunisian hospital. In 1908, Albert filmed aerial views using a balloon between Hammam-Lif and Grombalia. He later filmed the 1908 earthquake in Messina and took probably the first underwater shot in 1909. In 1910, he filmed Tuna fishing in Tunisia under the patronage of Albert I, Prince of Monaco.

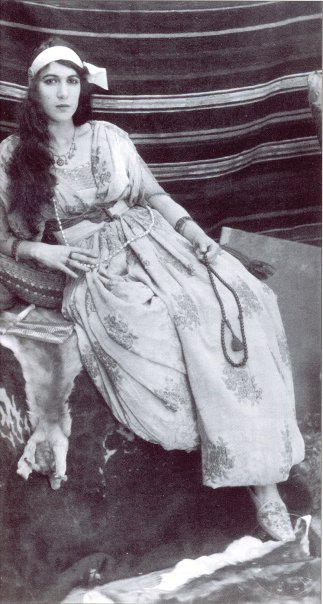
Haydée Tamzali, daughter

He developed a passion for documentaries and reporting where he began to cover events throughout Tunisia for the newspapers 'Le Matin' and 'L'Illustration'. In 1911, he was commissioned to cover the Italo-Turkish War took place in Tripolitania. Then he produced documentary images, such as 'La Pêche aux éponges' or 'Trafic d'Armes off Douara'. During the First World War, he joined the photographic and cinematographic section of the French armies and became one of the twelve reporters directed by Abel Gance who filmed the trenches of the Battle of Verdun.

In the 1920s he worked as the photographer and documentarian for travel magazines and tourist guides. In 1922 he was the cameraman in the film Tales of a Thousand and One Nights directed by Russian Victor Tourjanski. After spending many weeks among rural populations, Albert created the Encyclopedia in images of Tunisian life.

In 1922, Albert made his first short fiction film Zohra which is also the first Tunisian fiction film. The film received great success and was presented at the Omnia Pathé cinema in Tunisia on 21 December 1922. In the film, his daughter, Haydée Tamzali played the main role. Later she became ALbert's first female interpreter and screenwriter. Meanwhile, she becomes the first actress of the Arabian cinema.

In 1923, he directed the film Ain el-Ghezal ou la fille de Carthage, the first feature film directed by a Tunisian in Tunisian cinema history. It was produced with the support of Habib Bey.

== Legacy ==
In 1996, the biographical short film Albert Samama Chikli, this wonderful madman filming with his funny machines was directed by Mahmoud Ben Mahmoud in honor of Albert Samama.

== Filmography ==
Year	Film	Role	Genre	Ref.
1909	Brugge en Brussel	Director	Documentary	
1909	Antwerpen en Oostende	Director	Documentary	
1922	Zohra	Director, editor	Short film	
1924	Ain el-Ghezal ou la fille de Carthage	Director	Feature film	

== Gallery ==
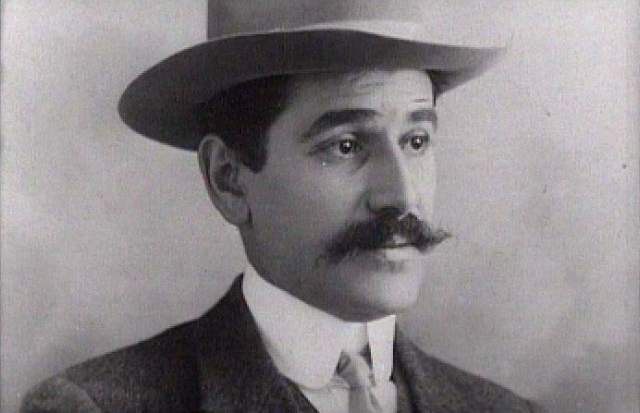
In his young age

Zohra film

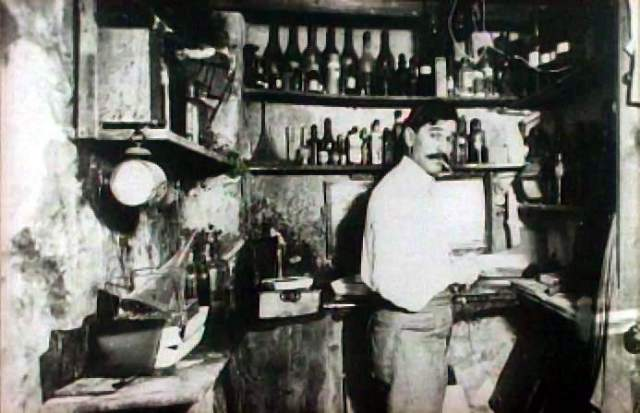

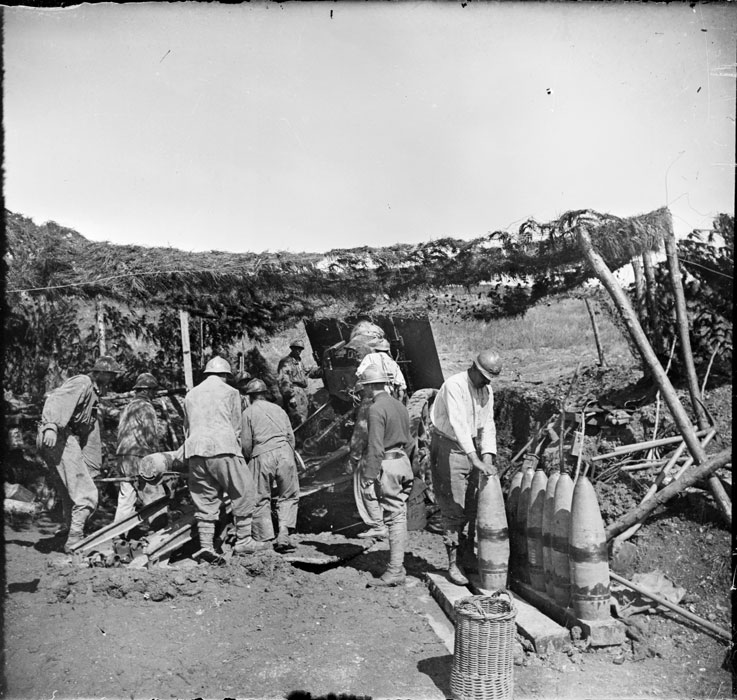

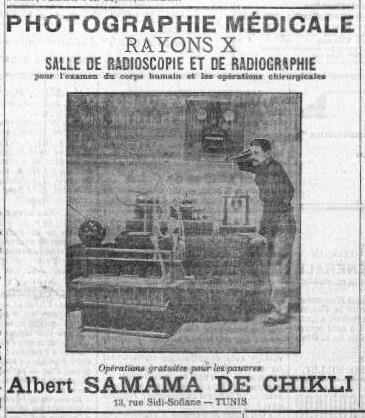

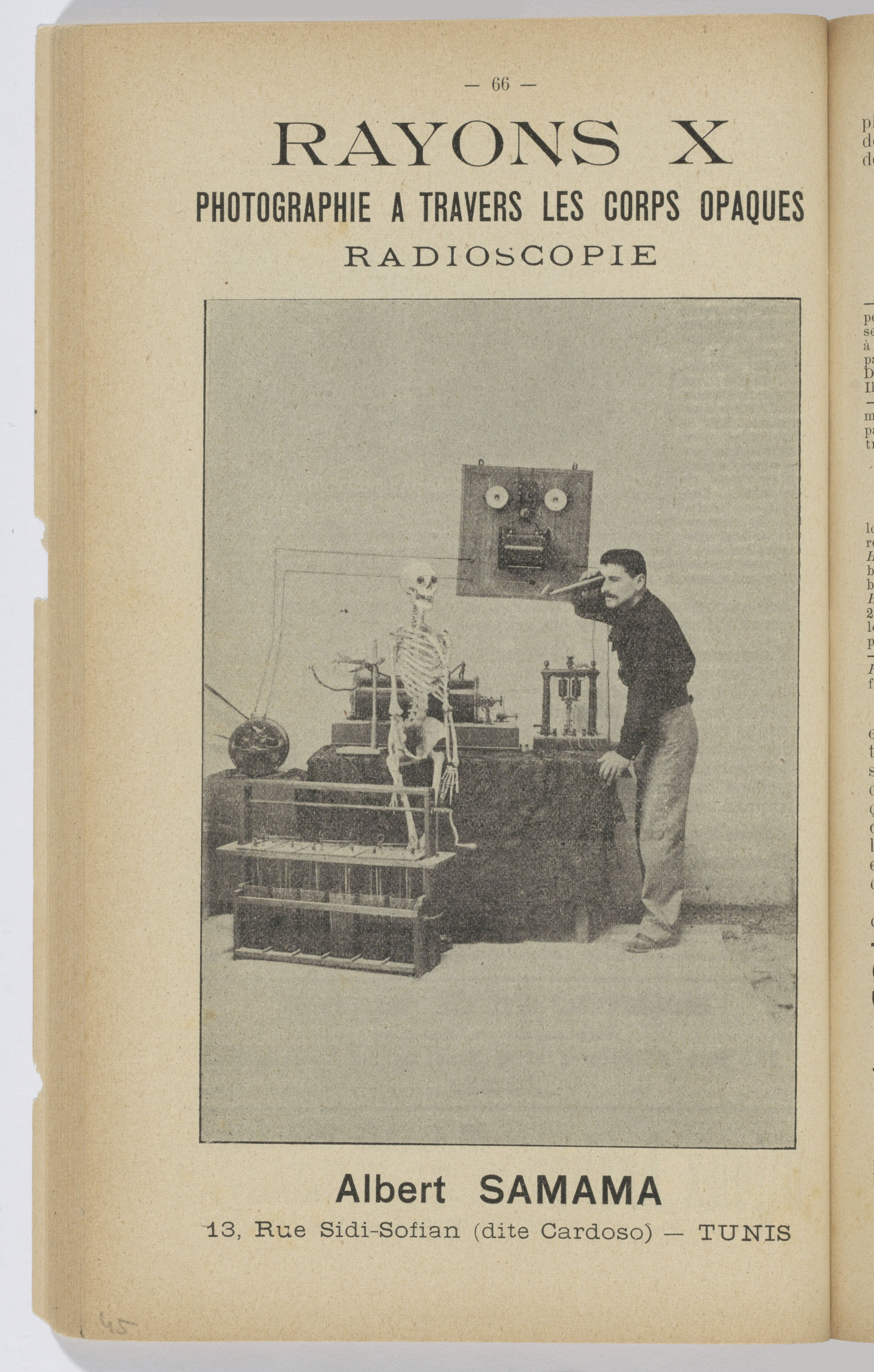
