= Néjia Ben Mabrouk =

Tunisian film director and screenwriter

- Born: 1 July 1949 (age 77); El Oudiane, Tunisia
- Education: Tunis University; INSAS
- Occupations: Screenwriter, director

Néjia Ben Mabrouk (born 1 July 1949) is a Tunisian screenwriter and director, known for her work on the award-winning film Sama and on the documentary The Gulf War... What Next?.

== Early life and education ==
Ben Mabrouk was born at El Oudiane, Tunisia, in 1949 and attended boarding school at Sfax. At a young age, she became familiar with European cinema and joined the local film club. Concerning her career plans growing up, she explains:

At that time I didn't want to make my own films, perhaps because there were no role models of women as filmmakers. All the directors were men; for me as a young woman, therefore, the more obvious choice was to tell stories through writing. I dreamed of writing novels.

During her college years, Ben Mabrouk first studied French at Tunis University, but had to leave after a few semesters for financial reasons. She began studying filmmaking at INSAS in 1972 at Brussels. Her film education was largely built on critical documentary film. She wrote and directed the film At Your Service for her graduation project in 1976, and then worked as a trainee for RTBF.

== Career ==
From 1979 to 1980, Ben Mabrouk started writing the script for her first full-length feature, Sama (The Trace). The film was finished in 1982, but a dispute with the production company SATPEC delayed the film's release until 1988. Sama won the Caligari Prize at the 1989 Berlin International Film Festival. Sama contains autobiographical elements from Ben Mabrouk's life, and tells the story of a young Tunisian girl seeking an education, which she eventually finds exiled in Europe.

She wrote and directed a fifteen-minute segment titled "In Search of Chaima" for the documentary The Gulf War... What Next? (1991), investigating the impact of war on women and children. She has written the screenplay for her second full-length feature, titled Nuit à Tunis (Night in Tunis).
