= San Felipe Gracia Real de Terrenate =

Coordinates: 31.2134°N 110.3399°W

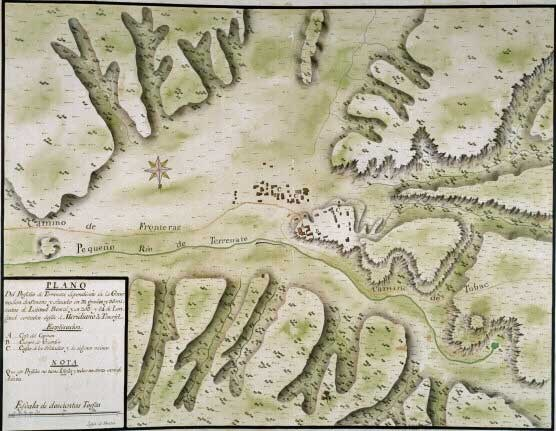
Map of San Felipe de Gracia Real de Terrenate by José de Urrutia

San Felipe Gracia Real de Guévavi de Terrenate was a Spanish presidio on Río Terrenate, a tributary of the San Pedro River.

At various times, the presidio was also called San Bernardo, San Pedro, San Mateo, San Felipe de Jesús, or Santa Cruz.

Established in 1741 at the site of a Pima settlement, the presidio was relocated to Las Nutrias in 1774, to Santa Cruz de Gaybanipitea shortly after, and to Mission Santa María Suamca in 1787. It was still extant in 1900.
