= Presidio de Lawis =

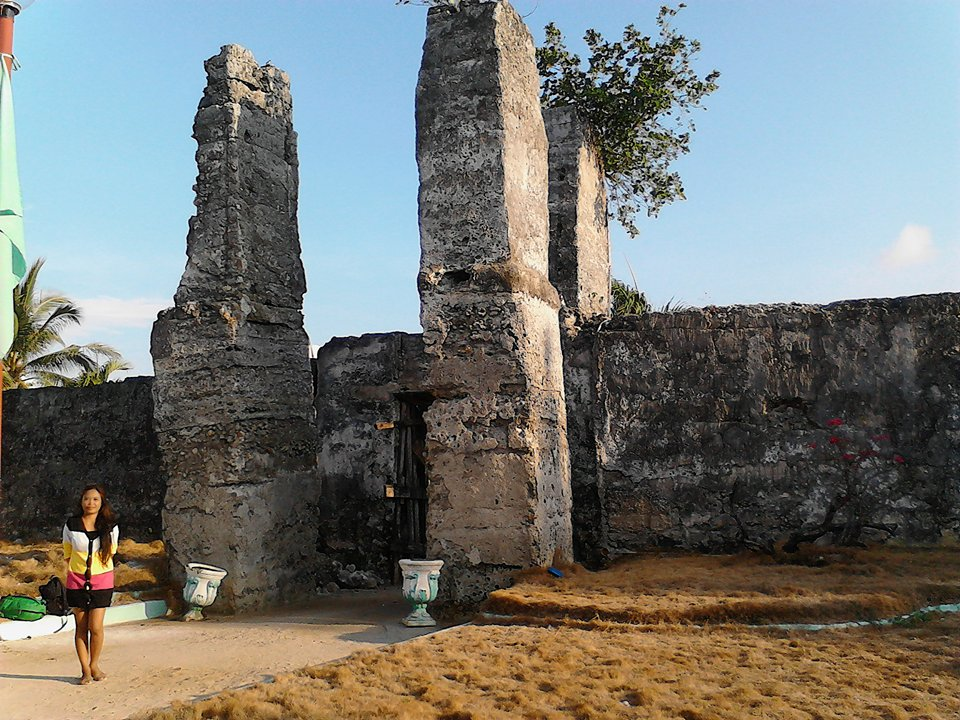
The ruins of Presidio

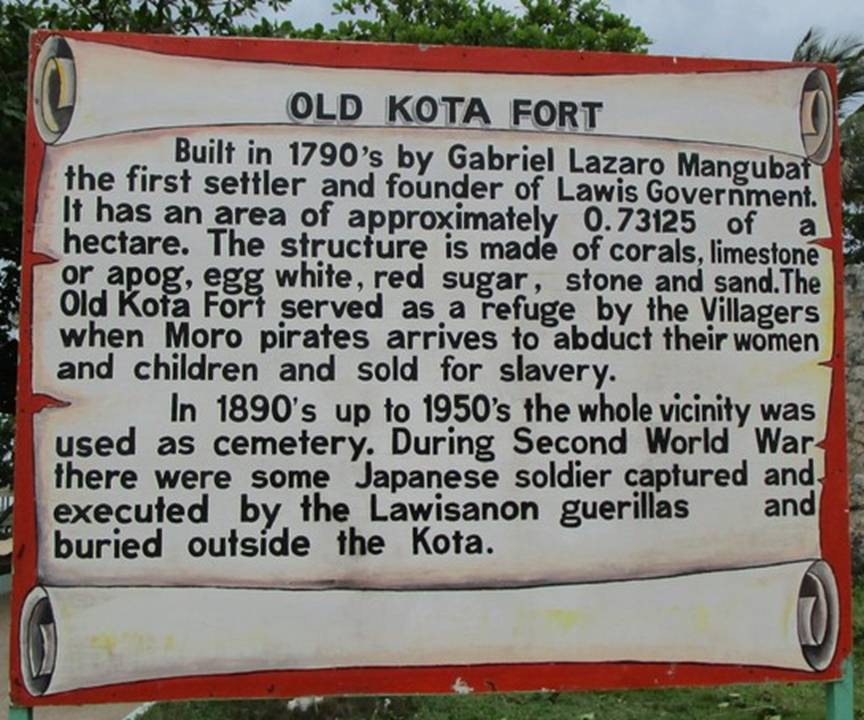
Kota historical marker

Presidio de Lawis, known more commonly as the Kota or fort, was a Spanish-era fortification laid down around 1628-1630 in the northernmost tip of Bantayan Island in Central Philippines that became the nucleus of the modern-day municipalities of Madridejos, Bantayan, and Santa Fe.

The edifice is the Philippines' oldest-surviving, and longest-standing original Spanish military fort structure, older than Fort San Pedro (current structure built in 1738), Fort Pilar (reconstructed in 1718), Fort San Felipe in Cavite (partly abolished during the US regime to give way for the construction of a Naval Station, and completely destroyed during World War II), Fort San Pedro (Iloilo) pulverized during World War II, and Fort Santiago in Manila (the current structure is only a replica, the original Spanish structure was totally destroyed during WWII).

== History ==
The town's centuries-old oral tradition states that the fort's foundation in Madridejos, Cebu can be traced back to the time of Lapu-Lapu's grandson who was the builder or the one who initiated the construction of the Kota himself. However, some modern researchers claim the fort was built in the 1790s.

To investigate these conflicting claims, Engr. Brient Mangubat, and Engr. Josito Clamor Dondon whose roots both came from Bantayan, sought contemporary accounts and historical records that would validate the town's oral tradition.

Their research revealed that a fort was indeed constructed on Bantayan Island before the 1790s. According to the accounts of Fr. Juan de Medina, after a pirate raid in year 1628, an Indio (a term used to denote a Filipino native) who was the benefice (Note: In ancient Rome a benefice was a gift of land (precaria) for life as a reward for services rendered) of Bantayan Island at the time, initiated the fort's construction.

Furthermore, the existence of a fort on Bantayan Island in the 1750s was again verified. The research states that an incumbent priest at the time mentioned a fort that the locals had to use to themselves from the Moro raiders in 1750, the last time an attack occurred on the island.

These findings debunk the claim that Bantayan Island only began to have a fort in the 1790s or later, particularly in the 1800s.
