= Zohra (film) =

1922 film by Albert Samama-Chikli

- Restored version of the film
- Directed by: Albert Samama Chikly
- Written by: Haydée Chikly
- Produced by: Albert Samama Chikly
- Starring: Haydée Chikly
- Release date: 1922
- Running time: 35 minutes
- Country: Tunisia
- Language: French intertitles

Zohra is a 1922 silent 35 mm short film from Tunisia by Albert Samama ('Chikly'). It was the first indigenous North African film production. The movie script was written by Chikly's daughter, Haydée Chikly, who also edited and starred as the key female protagonist in the film.

== Plot ==
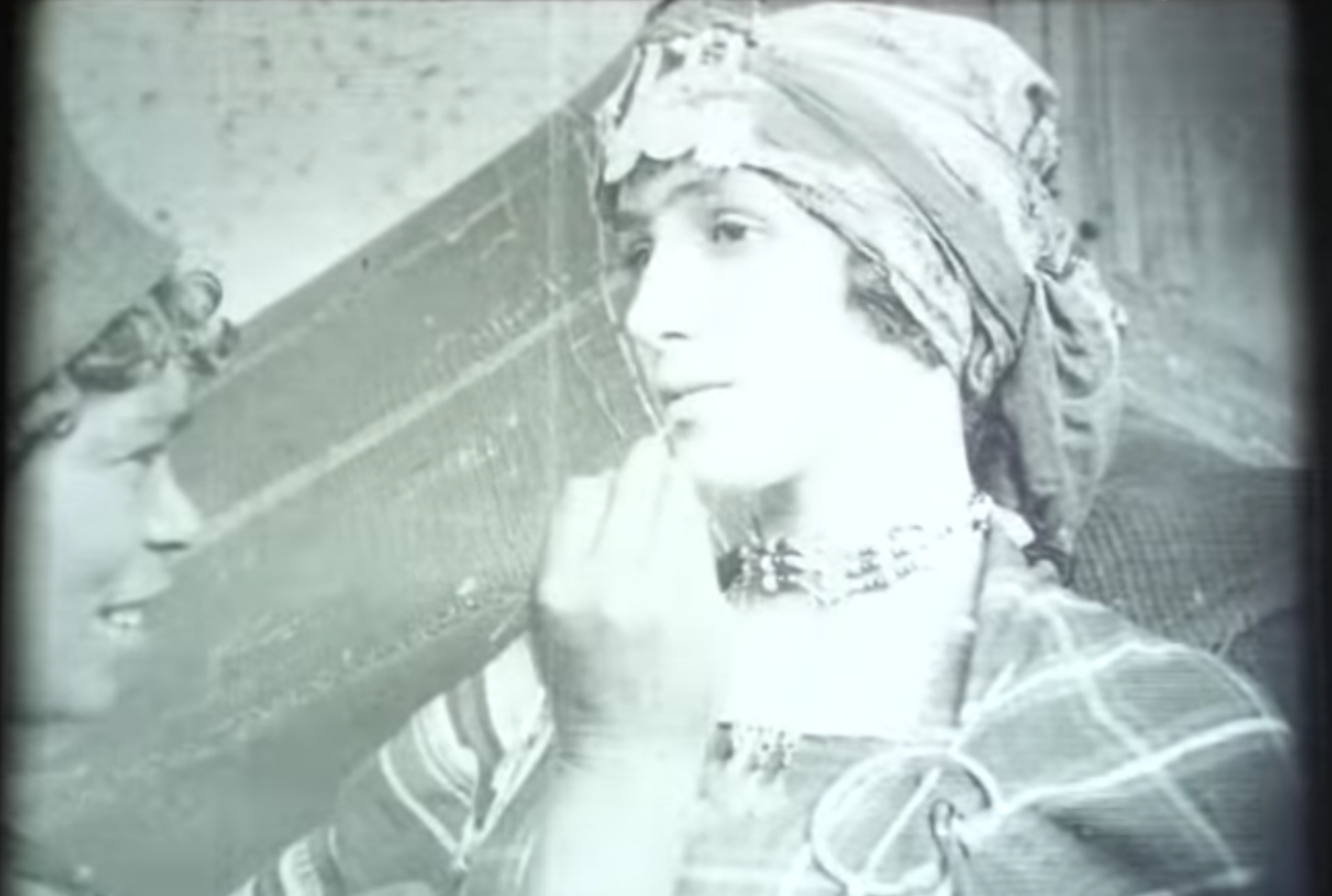
Haydée Chikly as Zohra

The plot of the movie evolves around a shipwrecked young French woman, who is rescued by Beduins. She lives with the Beduin tribe for a time. She is later abducted by bandits, but is rescued by a French aviator and reunites with her family. Tribal customs are displayed in detail in the film. The movie is seen as an example of the 'mysterious Orient' genre.

== Reception ==
The film was screened at the Omnia Pathé cinema in Tunis, and enjoyed a degree of success.
