= Lake of Tunis =

Natural lagoon in Tunisia

Coordinates: 36°49′N 10°15′E

Designations

Ramsar Wetland
- Official name: Complexe Lac de Tunis
- Designated: 23 January 2013
- Reference no.: 2096

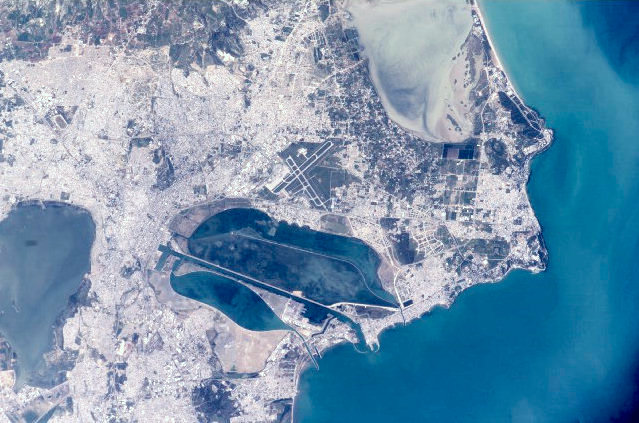
Satellite picture of Tunis

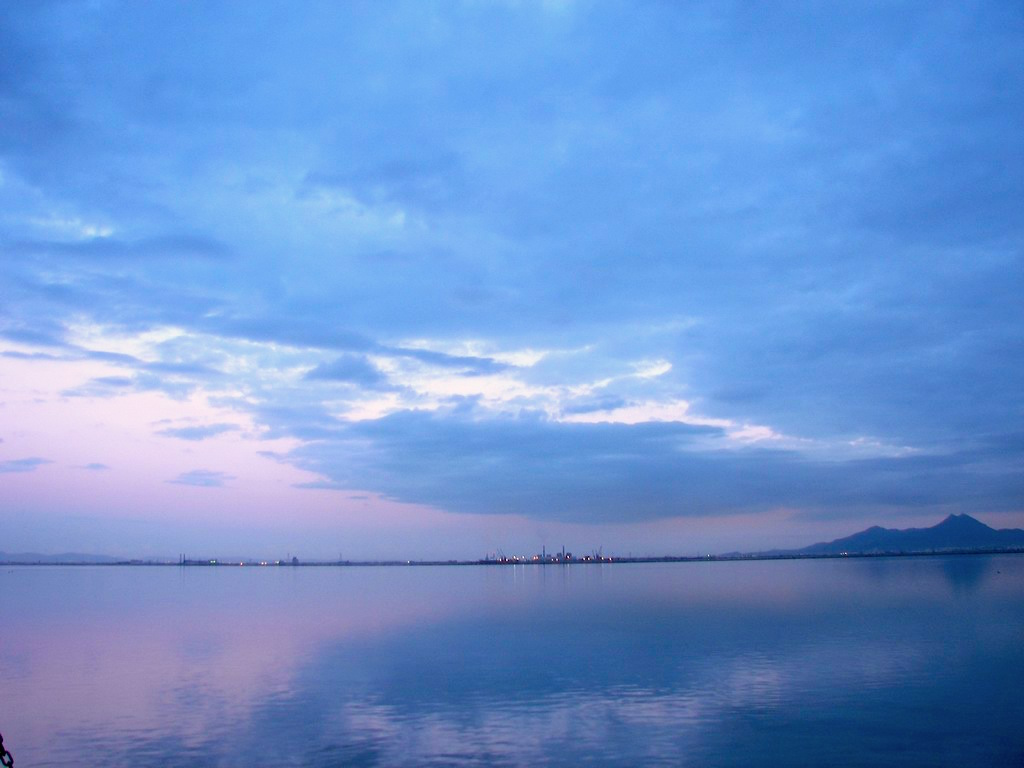
Lake of Tunis

The Lake of Tunis (Arabic: بحيرة تونس Buḥayra Tūnis; French: Lac de Tunis) is a natural lagoon located between the Tunisian capital city of Tunis and the Gulf of Tunis (Mediterranean Sea). The lake covers a total of 37 square kilometres, in contrast to its size its depth is very shallow. It was once the natural harbour of Tunis.

== History ==
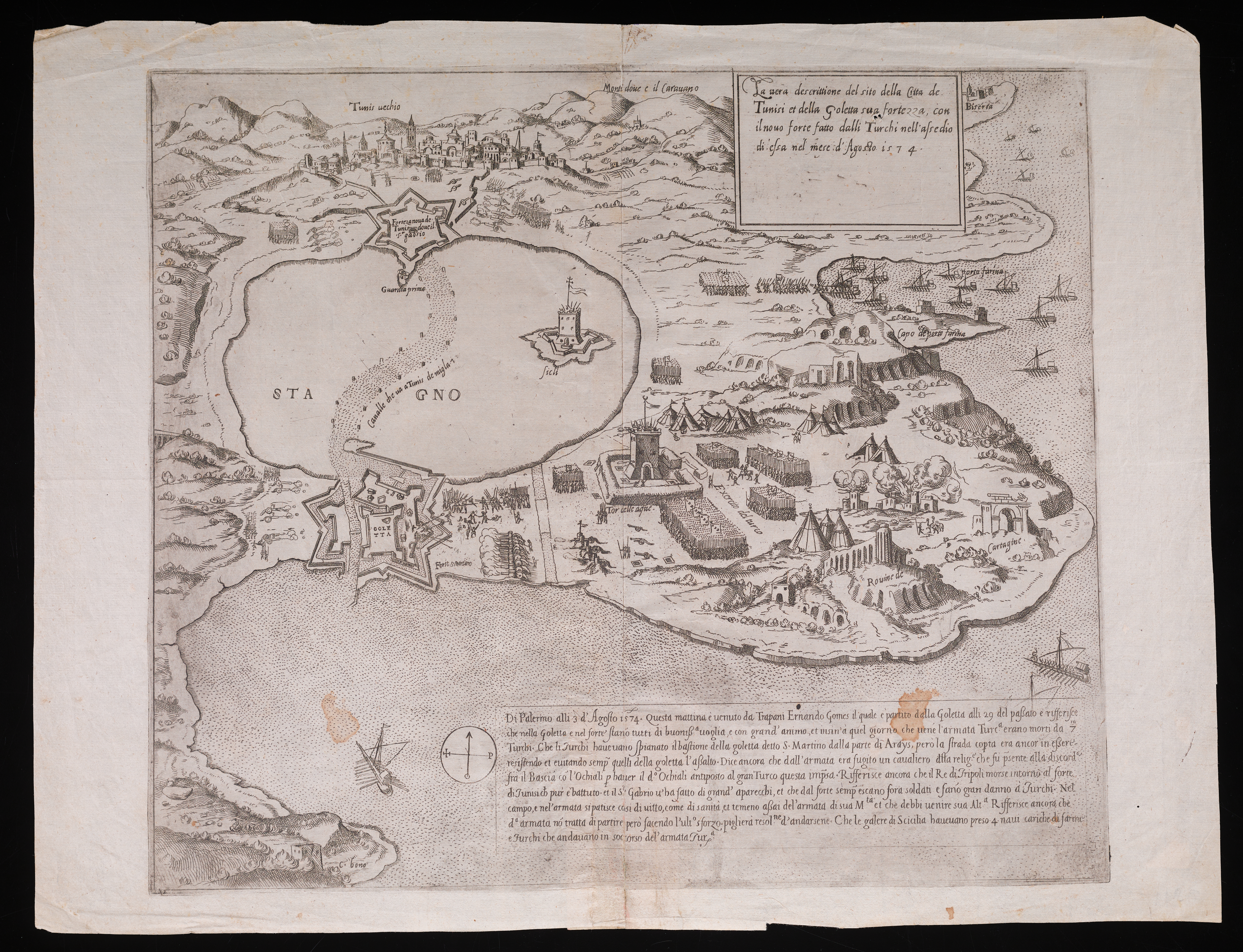
Tunis in 1574, with the lake, the channel and La Goulette.

The Tunis-Carthage connection was very important to the Romans, as it meant control over the fertile hinterland. The northern lake includes the island of Chikly, once home to a Roman and Spanish stronghold, and now (since 1993) a nature reserve. The lake is connected to the sea by a channel in La Goulette.

According to chronicler Prudencio de Sandoval, the lake caught the waste of Tunis and was shallow enough that a tall man could wade through. Only minor vessels could enter, capitalizing on a deeper channel excavated from La Goulette to the opposite shore and marked with wooden poles. Galleys could enter the lake, but only towed by men. During the conquest of Tunis, Ottoman admiral Hayreddin Barbarossa made most of his fleet anchor within the lake, helping the Goulette fortress with their artillery, although they were eventually all captured.

The lake continued to aggrade (an increase in land elevation, in this case of the lake bed, due to the deposition of sediment) during the 19th century. French colonial forces traversed the lake with a 10-kilometer long, 450-meter wide, and 6-meter deep canal. Its dam is used today as an expressway for automobiles and railway connecting Tunis to the harbour, La Goulette, and the coastal cities of Carthage, Sidi Bou Said, and La Marsa.
