= Chikly =

Island in Tunisia

Coordinates: 36°49′N 10°15′E

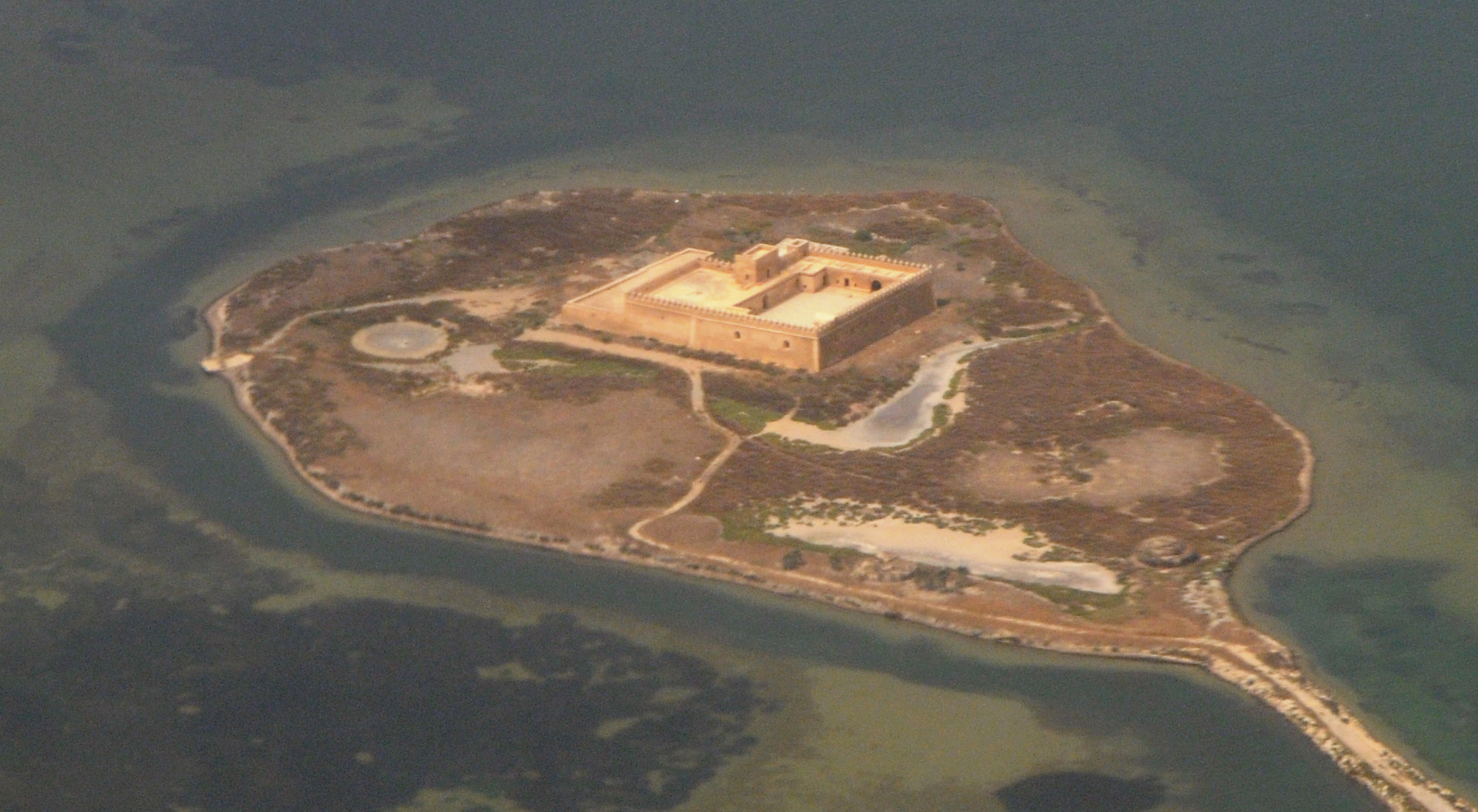
Chikly Island

Chikly (Arabic: شكلي) is a small island located in the northern part of Lake of Tunis which houses Fort Santiago Chikly, a former Roman citadel which was reconstructed by the Spanish Governor of Golettaalso, Luis Pérez de Vargas, between 1546 and 1550. It is connected to the kram through a path made of rocks. The fort was completely abandoned in 1830 and was left to deteriorate.

Chikly was declared a national cultural heritage asset in December 1993 and is owned by the Ministry of Culture of Tunisia. The fort is being restored through Tunisian-Spanish cooperation involving the National Heritage Institute and the University of Madrid. Excavation and cleaning took place in 1994 followed by archaeological excavations in 1995. These found mosaics and charts dating back to the Roman and Byzantine periods in the 4th and 5th centuries.

The island is also a nature reserve due to it being a nesting ground for little egrets.
