= Haydée Tamzali =

Tunisian screenwriter and actress (1906–1998)

- Born: 23 August 1906; Tunis
- Died: August 20, 1998 (aged 91)
- Citizenship: French protectorate of Tunisia, Tunisia
- Occupation(s): Screenwriter, Film actor, Film colorist, Film editor, Journalist, Writer

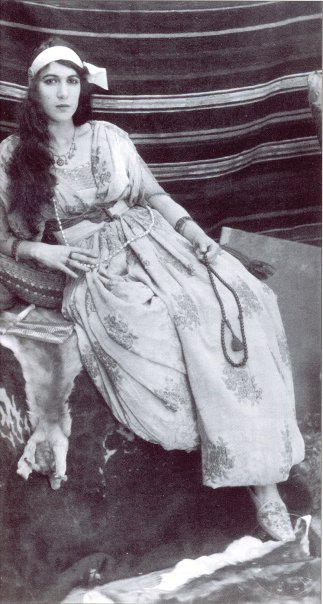
Haydee Tamzali

Haydée Samama Chikly Tamzali (23 August 1906 – 20 August 1998) was a Tunisian actress, writer, and filmmaker.

== Early life ==
Haydée Chikly was born in 1906 in Sidi Bou Said, the daughter of Tunisian Jewish filmmaker Albert Samama Chikly. Her mother was Bianca Ferrero, an Italian-born woman from Savoy. Tamzali's paternal grandfather, David Samama, was a banker of the Bey who established a banking institution that would later become the Bank of Tunisia.

== Career ==
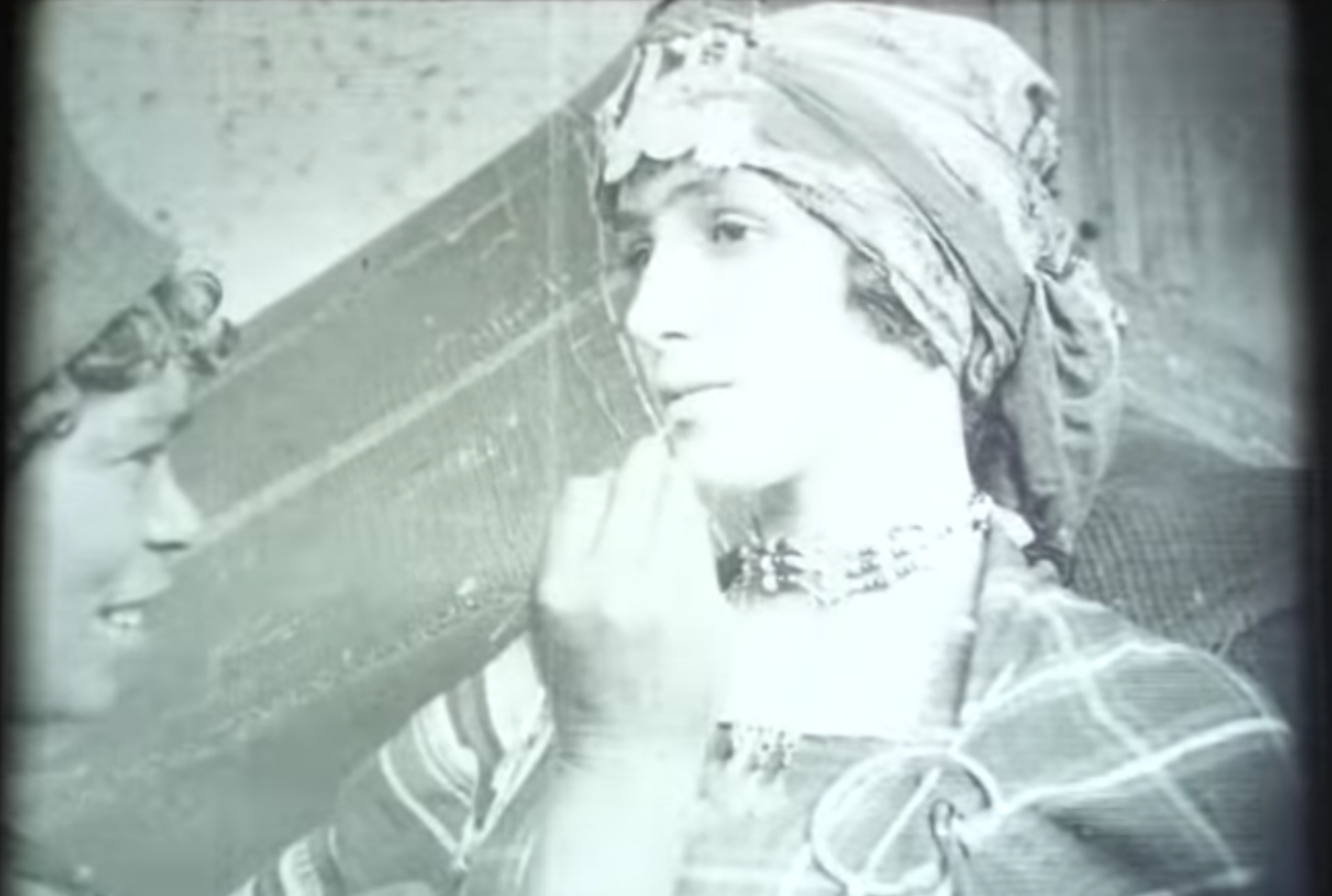
as Zohra in the 1922 restored film

Haydée Chikly worked with her father from girlhood. He directed her in her first starring role in a short film, Zohra (1922), written by her, and considered the first fiction film made in Tunisia. They followed this work with another silent drama in 1924, Ain el-Ghezal (The Girl from Carthage), also starring Haydée Chikly, in a story she wrote "to show how badly women were treated when they were just sold off with an arranged marriage into a man's world." The younger Chikly also took a turn at film editing and hand-coloring in her father's employ.

Haydée Chikly also appeared in Rex Ingram's The Arab (1924), but her father did not permit her to relocate to Hollywood to pursue an acting career.

In 1996, Haydée Tamzali appeared in the film A Summer in La Goulette, by Férid Boughedir.

She died on August 20, 1998, three days before her 92nd birthday.

== Private life ==
As an adult, Haydée Tamzali married, raised two children, lived in Algiers and Paris, and wrote a cookbook of North African cuisine, La Cuisine en Afrique du Nord.

In 1929, Haydée married the Algerian Khellil Tamzali and became Haydée Chikly Tamzali. She left Tunisia for Algeria where she continued to write. She was active in the civil society, becoming President of Social Works, Secretary of the Red Cross, and President of the League Against Cancer. She wrote many short stories and articles for the Tunisian national newspaper La Presse, as well a book in 1992 composed of true stories about the past called Lost Images.

== Filmography ==
- Zohra (1922)
- Aïn el Ghazal/La Fille de Carthage (1923)
- The Arab (1924)
- Un été à La Goulette (1996)

== Works ==
- Images retrouvées, 1992
- La cuisine en Afrique du Nord : 444 recettes tunisiennes, algériennes et marocaines dont 33 couscous, 1999
