= Société Anonyme Tunisienne de Production et d'Expansion Cinématographique =

Société Anonyme Tunisienne de Production et d'Expansion Cinématographique (SATPEC; English: Tunisian Company for Cinematic Production and Expansion) was a Tunisian film production company.

== History ==
Habib Bourguiba, the president of Tunisia, created SATPEC in 1964 and inaugurated it in 1968. In 1966, SATPEC established Gammarth Studios to promote local film productions. Gammarth was completed in 1968 and originally only processed film in black and white until 1983 when it became equipped to process films in colour.

During the 1970s, SATPEC had a monopoly on importing and producing foreign film in Tunisia. In 1973, SATPEC managed the newly re-opened Tunisian Cinémathèque. The government withdrew SATPEC's monopoly in 1981. SATPEC declared bankruptcy in the 1980s and was dissolved in 1994. In 2011, Tarak Ben Ammar purchased the laboratories of Gammarth Studios as part of Quinta Communications.
