= Mohcine Malzi =

Moroccan actor

- Born: November 6, 1982 (age 43); Marrakesh, Morocco
- Occupation: Actor
- Known for: Volubilis (2017); Rock the Kasbah (2015); Homeland (TV Series 2011–2020)

Mohcine Malzi (also Mouhcine Malzi) is a Moroccan actor.

== Career ==
Mohcine Malzi is known for his starring role of "Abdelkader" in Faouzi Bensaïdi's 2017 feature film, the romantic drama, Volubilis, also featuring Nadia Kounda and Nezha Rahil, and for which he won the "Best Actor" award at the 2018 Tangier National Film Festival (TNFF). In 2019, he starred in Saidi Bensaïdi's comedy-drama film, Taxi Bied, alongside Mohamed El Khyari, Sahar Seddiki, Anas El Baz, Hassan Foulane and Saida Baâdi and in 2020 starred in the Moroccan television movie, L'balisa, also featuring Ahmed Yreziz and Jalila Tlamsi. He teamed up again with Moroccan director Faouzi Bensaïdi for the feature film Summer Days scheduled to have its world premiere at the 2022 Marrakech Film Festival.

== Filmography ==
=== Film ===
Year	Film	Role	Notes	Ref.
2019	Taxi Bied	Actor	Comedy, Drama	
2017	Volubilis	Actor (Abdelkader)	Drama	
2016	Julie-Aicha	Actor	Comedy	
2015	Rock the Kasbah	Actor (Afghan Star Technician, as Mohcine Malzi)	Comedy, Music, War	
2015	Les griffes du passé	Actor (Mounir)	Thriller	
2014	Formatage	Actor	Drama	
2013	Elle est diabétique 3	Actor	Comedy	
2012	The Patience Stone	Actor (Soldier 2)	Drama, War	
2011	Death for Sale (Mort à vendre)	Actor (Allal)	Drama	

=== Television ===
Year	Film	Role	Notes	Ref.
2019	Ezzaima	Actor (Karim)	TV series (2019–2020), Drama	
2018 –	Wala alik	Actor in 1 Episode, 2018	TV series, Drama	
2017	Homeland	Actor	TV series (2011–2020), Crime, Drama, Mystery	

== Accolades ==
Year	Event	Prize	Recipient	Result
2018	TNFF	Best actor	Himself	Won
