= Nezha Rahil =

Moroccan actress

- Citizenship: Morocco
- Occupation: Actress
- Notable work: Fatima
- Spouse: Faouzi Bensaïdi

Nezha Rahil is a Moroccan actress. She is known for her frequent appearances in her husband Faouzi Bensaïdi's films.

== Filmography ==
=== Feature films ===
- 1995: Chevaux de fortune
- 1998: Adieu forain
- 2003: A Thousand Months (Mille mois)
- 2006: WWW: What a Wonderful World
- 2007: Number One
- 2011: Death for Sale (Mort à vendre)
- 2015: Fatima
- 2017: Volubilis

=== Short films ===
- 2000: Trajets
- 2000: Le Mur
