= Global Film Initiative =

The Global Film Initiative (GFI) was a non-profit film organization that supported cinematic works from developing nations and promotes cross-cultural understanding through use of film and non-traditional learning resources. Its most notable programs are the Global Lens Film Series, a traveling film-series that premieres annually at the Museum of Modern Art, New York and is accompanied by educational screening-programs for high school students, and the Granting program, which has awarded numerous grants to narrative film-projects from around the world, many of which have been nominated as official country selections for the Academy Award for Best International Feature Film category of the Academy Awards.

The Global Film Initiative was founded by Susan Coulter Weeks in 2002 and is advised by a board of directors, and a film-board composed of filmmakers such as Mira Nair, Lars von Trier, Pedro Almodóvar, Bela Tarr, Carlos Reygadas, Christopher Doyle, and Djamshed Usmonov. In 2004, it entered into a partnership with First Run Features for distribution of all films in the Global Lens Film Series, and in 2006, it moved its offices from the West Village of New York to the Potrero Hill district of San Francisco, California (USA). Their office is currently located in the Ninth Street Independent Film Center in San Francisco.

== GFI Programs ==
Global Lens is a traveling film series composed of cinematic works from developing nations or regions (i.e. Africa, Latin America, Asia, the Middle East, Oceania, etc.). It shows up to ten narrative feature-films a year, premiering annually at the Museum of Modern Art, New York in late-January, following its premiere the series is screened in fifteen to twenty cities across the United States, in collaboration with various cultural and cinematic organizations and institutions, before going into general distribution through GFI's distribution-partner, First Run Features.

The Acquisitions program acquires eight to ten feature-length narrative films per year for presentation in the Global Lens Film Series. Films acquired by GFI are discovered through the Granting program and also through independent festivals and sales-initiatives, such as the International Film Festival Rotterdam, Berlinale, and CineMart, and all films are selected for their artistic excellence, authentic self-representation and accomplished storytelling. Documentary and/or short films are not considered.

The Granting program awards up to twenty grants each year to filmmakers whose projects are nearing completion or in post-production. Projects awarded grants by the Global Film Initiative are often acquired for presentation in the Global Lens Film Series, and since its inception, the Granting program has supported the production of a number of award-winning films, many of which have been nominated as official country selections in the Foreign Language category of the Academy of Motion Picture Arts and Sciences' awards ceremony, the Academy Awards.

== Global Lens 2011 ==
(Films listed in alphabetical order)

- A Useful Life (La Vida Útil) by Federico Veiroj, Uruguay, 2010
- Belvedere by Ahmed Imamović, Bosnia & Herzegovina, 2010
- Dooman River by Zhang Lu, China, 2009
- Soul of Sand (Pairon Talle) by Sidharth Srinivasan, India, 2010
- Street Days (Quchis Dgeebi) by Levan Koguashvili, Georgia, 2010
- The Invisible Eye (La Mirada Invisible) by Diego Lerman, Argentina, 2010
- The Tenants (Os Inquilinos) by Sérgio Bianchi, Brazil, 2009
- The White Meadows (Keshtzar Haye Sepid) by Mohammad Rasoulof, Iran, 2009
- The Light Thief (Svet-Ake) by Aktan Arym Kubat, Kyrgyzstan, 2010

== Global Lens 2010 ==
- Adrift (Choi Voi) by Bui Thac Chuyen, Vietnam, 2009
- Becloud (Vaho) by Alejandro Gerber Bicecci, Mexico, 2009
- Gods (Dioses) by Josué Méndez, Peru, 2008
- Leo's Room (El Cuarto De Leo) by Enrique Buchichio, Uruguay, 2009
- Masquerades (Mascarades) by Lyes Salem, Algeria, 2008
- My Tehran for Sale by Granaz Moussavi, Iran, 2009
- Ocean of an Old Man by Rajesh Shera, India, 2008
- Ordinary People by Vladimir Perisic, Serbia, 2009
- The Shaft (Dixia De Tiankong) by Zhang Chi, China, 2008
- Shirley Adams by Oliver Hermanus, South Africa, 2009

== Global Lens 2009 ==
- Getting Home (Luo Ye Gui Gen) by Zhang Yang, China, 2007
- I Am From Titov Veles (Jas Sum Od Titov Veles) by Teona Strugar Mitevska, Macedonia, 2007
- Mutum by Sandra Kogut, Brazil, 2007
- My Time Will Come (Cuando Me Toque A Mi) by Víctor Arregui, Ecuador, 2008
- The Photograph by Nan Achnas, Indonesia, 2007
- Possible Lives (Las Vidas Possibles) by Sandra Gugliotta, Argentina, 2007
- Sleepwalking Land (Terra Sonâmbula) by Teresa Prata, Mozambique, 2007
- Song From the Southern Seas (Pesn' Juzhnykh Morej) by Marat Sarulu, Kazakhstan, 2008
- Those Three (An Seh) by Naghi Nemati, Iran, 2007
- What A Wonderful World by Faouzi Bensaïdi, Morocco, 2006

== Global Lens 2008 ==
- All for Free (Sve Džaba) by Antonio Nuić, Croatia, 2006
- The Bet Collector (Kubrador) by Jeffrey Jeturian, Philippines, 2006
- Bunny Chow by John Barker, South Africa, 2006
- The Custodian (El Custodio) by Rodrigo Moreno, Argentina, 2006
- The Fish Fall in Love (Mahiha Ashegh Mishavand) by Ali Raffi, Iran, 2006
- Kept and Dreamless (Las Mantenidas Sin Sueos) by Vera Fogwill and Martín Desalvo, Argentina, 2005
- The Kite (Le Cerf-Volant) by Randa Chahal Sabbag, Lebanon, 2004
- Let The Wind Blow (Hava Aney Dey) by Partho Sen-Gupta, India, 2005
- Wang Chao (Jiang Cheng Xia Ri) by Wang Chao, China, 2006
- Opera Jawa by Garin Nugroho, Indonesia, 2006
- The fifth string (La 5ème corde) by Selma Bargach , Morocco, 2010

== Global Lens 2007 ==
- Another Man's Garden (O Jardim do Outro Homem) by João Luis Sol de Carvalho, Mozambique, 2006
- Dam Street (Hong Yan) by Li Yu, China, 2005
- On Each Side (A Cada Lado) by Hugo Grosso, Argentina, 2006
- Enough! (Barakat!) by Djamila Sahraoui, Algeria, 2006
- Fine Dead Girls (Fine Mertve Djevojke) by Dalibor Matanić, Croatia, 2002
- Kilometre Zero by Hiner Saleem, Iraqi Kurdistan, 2005
- Of Love and Eggs (Rindu Kami Padamu) by Garin Nugroho, Indonesia, 2004
- The Sacred Family (La Sagrada Familia) by Sebastián Campos, Chile, 2005
- A Wonderful Night in Split (Ta Divna Splitska Noc) by Arsen Anton Ostojic, Croatia, 2004
- Global Shorts 2007, from Various Directors

== Global Lens 2006 ==
- Almost Brothers (Quase Dois Irmãos) by Lúcia Murat, Brazil, 2004
- Border Cafe (Café Transit) by Kambozia Partovi, Iran, 2005
- Cinema, Aspirins and Vultures (Cinema, Aspirinas e Urubus) by Marcelo Gomes, Brazil, 2005
- In the Battlefields (Dans les Champs de Bataille) by Danielle Arbid, Lebanon, 2004
- Max and Mona by Teddy Mattera, South Africa, 2004
- The Night of Truth (La Nuit de la Verite) by Fanta Régina Nacro, Burkina Faso, 2004
- Stolen Life by Li Shaohong, China, 2005
- Thirst (Atash)' by Tawfik Abu Wael, Israel/Palestine, 2004
- Global Shorts 2006, from Various Directors

== Global Lens 2005 ==
- Buffalo Boy by Nguyen-Vô Nghiem-Minh, Vietnam, 2004
- Daughter of Keltoum (La Fille de Keltoum) by Mehdi Charef, Algeria, 2001
- Fuse (Gori Vatra) by Pjer Zalica, Bosnia-Herzegovina, 2003
- Hollow City (Na Cidade Vazia) by Maria João Ganga, Angola, 2004
- Kabala by Assane Kouyaté, Mali, 2002
- Lili's Apron (El Delantal de Lili) by Mariano Galperin, Argentina, 2004
- Uniform by Diao Yinan, China, 2003
- What's a Human Anyway by Reha Erdem, Turkey, 2004
- Whisky by Juan Pablo Rebella and Pablo Stoll, Uruguay, 2004
- Today and Tomorrow (Hoy y Mañana) by Alejandro Chomski, Argentina, 2003

== Global Lens 2004/2003 ==
- Angel on the Right (Farishtay Kitfi Rost) by Djamshed Usmonov, Tajikistan, 2002
- Khorma by Saadi, Tunisia, 2002
- Mango Yellow by Cláudio Assis, Brazil, 2002
- Margarette's Feast (A Festa de Margarette) by Renato Falcão, Brazil, 2002
- Nothing More (NADA +) by Juan Carlos Cremata Malberti, Cuba, 2001
- Rachida by Yamina Bachir-Chouikh, Algeria, 2002
- Shadow Kill (Nizhalkkuthu) by Adoor Gopalakrishnan, India, 2002
- Ticket to Jerusalem by Rashid Masharawi, Palestine, 2002
- Women's Prison by Manijeh Hekmat, Iran, 2002
- Wretched Lives (Hubog) by Joel Lamangan, Philippines, 2001
