= 2003 Cannes Film Festival =

- Official poster of the 56th Cannes Film Festival featuring an original illustration by Jenny Holzer.
- Opening film: Fanfan la Tulipe
- Closing film: Charlie: The Life and Art of Charles Chaplin
- Location: Cannes, France
- Founded: 1946
- Awards: Palme d'Or: Elephant
- Hosted by: Monica Bellucci
- No. of films: 20 (Main Competition)
- Festival date: 14 May 2003 – 25 May 2003
- Website: festival-cannes.com/en

Cannes Film Festival
- 2004 2002

The 56th Cannes Film Festival took place from 14 to 25 May 2003. French opera and theatre director, filmmaker, actor and producer Patrice Chéreau was the President of the Jury for the main competition. Monica Bellucci hosted the opening and closing ceremonies.

American filmmaker Gus Van Sant won the Palme d'Or, the festival's top prize, for the drama film Elephant, based on the Columbine High School massacre. Ingmar Bergman was awarded with the Honorary Palme d'Or for his contributions to cinema throughout his career.

The festival opened with Fanfan la Tulipe by Gérard Krawczyk, and closed with Charlie: The Life and Art of Charles Chaplin by Richard Schickel.

2003 Un Certain Regard poster, adapted from an original illustration by Oswaldo Vigas.

== Juries ==
The following people were appointed as the Jury for the various sections below:

=== Main competition ===
- Patrice Chéreau, French filmmaker, actor and producer - Jury President
- Erri De Luca, Italian poet
- Jiang Wen, Chinese actor, screenwriter and director
- Aishwarya Rai, Indian actress
- Jean Rochefort, French actor
- Meg Ryan, American actress
- Steven Soderbergh, American filmmaker
- Danis Tanović, Bosnian filmmaker
- Karin Viard, French actress

=== Un Certain Regard ===
- Abderrahmane Sissako, Mauritanian filmmaker - Jury President
- Jannike Ahlund
- Geoff Andrew, British writer
- Alexis Campion
- Christine Masson
- Pierre Todeschini

=== Cinéfondation and Short Films Competition ===
- Emir Kusturica, Serbian filmmaker - Jury President
- Mary Lea Bandy, American director of Patrimoine Au Moma
- Zabou Breitman, French actress, director
- Ingeborga Dapkunaite, Lithuanian actress
- Michel Ocelot, French director

=== Camera d'Or ===
- Wim Wenders, German filmmaker - Jury President
- Laurent Aknin, French critic
- Alain Champetier, French Representative of the technical industries
- Géraldine d'Haen, French secretary of the jury
- Gian Luca Farinelli, Italian cinephile
- Agnès Godard, French cinematographer
- Claude Makovski, French cinephile
- Bernard Uhlmann, Swizz cinephile
- Christian Vincent, French director

== Official selection ==
=== In Competition ===
The following feature films competed for the Palme d'Or:

English title	Original title	Director(s)	Production Country
At Five in the Afternoon	پنج عصر	Samira Makhmalbaf	Iran, France
The Barbarian Invasions	Les Invasions barbares	Denys Arcand	Canada, France
Bright Future	アカルイミライ	Kiyoshi Kurosawa	Japan
The Brown Bunny		Vincent Gallo	United States, Japan
Carandiru		Héctor Babenco	Brazil, Argentina
Les Côtelettes		Bertrand Blier	France
Dogville		Lars von Trier	Denmark, United Kingdom, Sweden, France, Germany
Elephant		Gus Van Sant	United States
Father and Son	Отец и сын	Alexander Sokurov	Russia
Incantato	Il cuore altrove	Pupi Avati	Italy
Little Lili	La Petite Lili	Claude Miller	France
Mystic River		Clint Eastwood	United States
Purple Butterfly	紫蝴蝶	Lou Ye	China
Shara	沙羅双樹	Naomi Kawase	Japan
Strayed	Les égarés	André Téchiné	France
Swimming Pool		François Ozon	France, United Kingdom
That Day	Ce jour-là	Raúl Ruiz	Switzerland, France
The Tulse Luper Suitcases, Part 1: The Moab Story		Peter Greenaway	Netherlands, United Kingdom
Tiresia		Bertrand Bonello	France
Uzak		Nuri Bilge Ceylan	Turkey

=== Un Certain Regard ===
The following films were selected for the competition of Un Certain Regard:

English title	Original title	Director(s)	Production Country
All Tomorrow's Parties	明日天涯	Yu Lik-wai	China
American Splendor		Shari Springer Berman and Robert Pulcini	United States
Arimpara	അരിമ്പാറ	Murali Nair	India
The Best of Youth	La meglio gioventù	Marco Tullio Giordana	Italy
Crimson Gold	طلای سرخ	Jafar Panahi	Iran
Drifters	二弟	Wang Xiaoshuai	China, Hong Kong
Japanese Story		Sue Brooks	Australia
Kiss of Life		Emily Young	United Kingdom
Playing 'In the Company of Men'	En jouant 'Dans la compagnie des hommes'	Arnaud Desplechin	France
Robinson's Crusoe	魯賓遜漂流記	Lin Cheng-sheng	Taiwan
September		Max Färberböck	Germany
Soldiers of Salamina	Soldados de Salamina	David Trueba	Spain
The Southern Cross	La cruz del sur	Pablo Reyero	Argentina
Stormy Weather	Stormviðri	Sólveig Anspach	France, Iceland
Struggle		Ruth Mader	Austria
A Thousand Months	Mille mois	Faouzi Bensaïdi	France, Morocco
Today and Tomorrow	Hoy y mañana	Alejandro Chomski	Argentina
Where Is Madame Catherine?	Les mains vides	Marc Recha	France, Spain
Young Adam		David Mackenzie	United Kingdom

=== Out of Competition ===
The following films were selected to be screened out of competition:

English title	Original title	Director(s)	Production Country
Charlie: The Life and Art of Charles Chaplin (closing film)		Richard Schickel	United States
Claude Sautet or the Invisible Magic	Claude Sautet ou La magie invisible	N. T. Binh	France, Germany
Coming and Going	Vai e Vem	João César Monteiro	Portugal, France
Easy Riders, Raging Bulls		Kenneth Bowser	United States, United Kingdom
Fanfan la Tulipe (opening film)		Gérard Krawczyk	France
The Fog of War		Errol Morris	United States
Ghosts of the Abyss		James Cameron	United States
Il grido d'angoscia dell'uccello predatore (20 tagli d'Aprile)		Nanni Moretti	Italy
The Last Customer		Nanni Moretti	Italy
Les marches etc... (une comédie musicale)		Gilles Jacob	France
The Matrix Reloaded		The Wachowskis	United States
Modern Times (1936)		Charlie Chaplin	United States
S-21: The Khmer Rouge Killing Machine	S-21, la machine de mort Khmère rouge	Rithy Panh	Cambodia, France
The Soul of a Man		Wim Wenders	United States, Germany
Time of the Wolf	Le Temps du Loup	Michael Haneke	France, Austria, Germany
The Triplets of Belleville	Les Triplettes de Belleville	Sylvain Chomet	France, Belgium, Canada, United Kingdom
Wekande Walauwa (Mansion by the Lake)	වෑකන්ද වලව්ව	Lester James Peries	Sri Lanka
Who Killed Bambi?	Qui a tué Bambi?	Gilles Marchand	France

=== Cinéfondation ===
The following short films were selected for the competition of Cinéfondation:

- 19 At 11 by Michael Schwartz
- Am See by Ulrike von Ribbeck
- Bezi zeko bezi by Pavle Vučković
- Dremano oko by Vladimir Perisic
- Fish Never Sleep by Gaëlle Denis
- Five Deep Breaths by Seith Mann
- Free Loaders by Haim Tabakman
- Historia del desierto (short) by Celia Galan Julve
- Hitokoroshi no ana by Ikeda Chihiro
- Le pacte by Heidi Maria Faisst
- Like Twenty Impossibles by Annemarie Jacir
- Mechanika by David Sukup
- Rebeca a esas alturas by Luciana Jauffred Gorostiza
- Stuck by Jeremy Roberts
- The Box Man by Nirvan Mullick
- The Water Fight by Norah McGettigan
- TV City by Alejandra Tomei, Alberto Couceiro
- Empty for Love by Vimukthi Jayasundara
- Wonderful Day by Hyun-Pil Kim
- Zero by Carolina Rivas

=== Short film competition ===
The following short films competed for the Short Film Palme d'Or:

- Cracker Bag by Glendyn Ivin
- L'enfant promis by Marsa Makris
- Fast Film by Virgil Widrich
- La fenêtre ouverte by Philippe Barcinski
- L'homme le plus beau du monde by Alicia Duffy
- L'homme sans tête by Juan Solanas
- Je germe by Esther Rots
- Mon frère aveugle by Sophie Goodhart
- Neige au mois de Novembre by Karolina Jonsson

== Parallel sections ==
=== International Critics' Week ===
The following films were screened for the 42nd International Critics' Week (42e Semaine de la Critique):

Feature film competition

- 20H17, Rue Darling by Bernard Edmond (Canada)
- Deux Fereshté (Two Angels) by Mamad Haghighat (Iran)
- Elle est des nôtres by Siegrid Alnoy (France)
- Entre ciclones by Enrique Colina (Cuba)
- Milwaukee, Minnesota by Allan Mindel (United States)
- Reconstruction by Christoffer Boe (Denmark)
- Since Otar Left (Depuis qu'Otar est parti...) by Julie Bertuccelli (France, Belgium, Georgia)

Short film competition

- Belarra by Koldo Almandoz (Spain)
- Derrière les fagots by Ron Dyens (France)
- Love Is the Law by Eivind Tolas (Norway)
- Maste by Erik Rosenlund (Sweden)
- La Petite Fille by Licia Eminenti (France)
- The Truth About the Head by Dale Heslip (Canada)
- Turangawaewae by Peter Burger (New Zealand)

Special screenings

- Off the map by Campbell Scott (United States) (opening film)
- Camarades by Marin Karmitz (France) (La séance du Parrain)
- Condor : les axes du mal by Rodrigo Vasque (France) (Documentary)
- Araki – The Killing of a Japanese Photographer by Anders Morgenthaller (Denmark) (Short film)
- Good Night by Chun Sun-Young (South Korea) (Short film)
- Nosferatu Tango by Zoltán Horváth (Switzerland, France) (Short film)
- B.B. & Il Cormorano by Edoardo Gabbriellini (Italy) (closing film)

=== Directors' Fortnight ===
Apart from 16 short films, the following feature films were screened for the 2003 Directors' Fortnight (Quinzaine des Réalizateurs):

- Bright Leaves (doc.) by Ross McElwee (United States, United Kingdom)
- Carême by José Álvaro Morais (Portugal)
- La chose publique by Mathieu Amalric (France)
- Cry No More (Les Yeux secs) by Narjiss Nejjar (France, Morocco)
- Deep Breath by Parviz Shahbazi (Iran)
- Feathers in My Head (Des plumes dans la tête) by Thomas De Thier (Belgium, France)
- Gozu by Takashi Miike (Japan)
- The Hours of the Day (Las horas del día) by Jaime Rosales (Spain)
- Interstella 5555 by Kazuhisa Takenouchi (Japan, France)
- L'Isola by Costanza Quatriglio (Italy)
- James' Journey to Jerusalem by Ra'anan Alexandrowicz (Israel)
- Kitchen Stories (Salmer fra Kjøkkenet) by Bent Hamer (United States, Norway)
- Kleine Freiheit by Yüksel Yavuz (Germany)
- Les Lionceaux by Claire Doyon (France)
- Love Film (Filme de amor) by Júlio Bressane (Brazil)
- Mike Brant – Laisse moi t'aimer (doc.) by Erez Laufer (France, Israel)
- Le Monde vivant by Eugène Green (France, Belgium)
- The Mother by Roger Michell (United Kingdom)
- Naked Childhood (L'enfance nue) by Maurice Pialat (France)
- Niki and Flo (Niki Ardelean, colonel în rezerva) by Lucian Pintilie (Romania, France)
- No pasarán, album souvenir (doc.) by Henri-François Imbert (France)
- No Rest for the Brave (Pas de repos pour les braves) by Alain Guiraudie (France, Austria)
- Osama by Siddiq Barmak (Afghanistan, Netherlands, Japan, Ireland, Iran)
- Saltimbank by Jean-Claude Biette (France)
- Seducing Doctor Lewis (La grande séduction) by Jean-François Pouliot (Canada)
- The Forest (Le Silence de la forêt) by Bassek ba Kobhio, Didier Ouénangaré (Cameroon, France)
- Sansa by Siegfried (Spain, France)
- Les Terres de l'ogre by Sami Kafati (Honduras, France)
- Watermark by Georgina Willis (Australia)
- The Woman Who Believed She Was President of the United States (A Mulher que Acreditava ser Presidente dos Estados Unidos da América) by João Botelho (Portugal)
- Im Anfang war der Blick by Bady Minck (Austria/Luxembourg)

== Official Awards ==
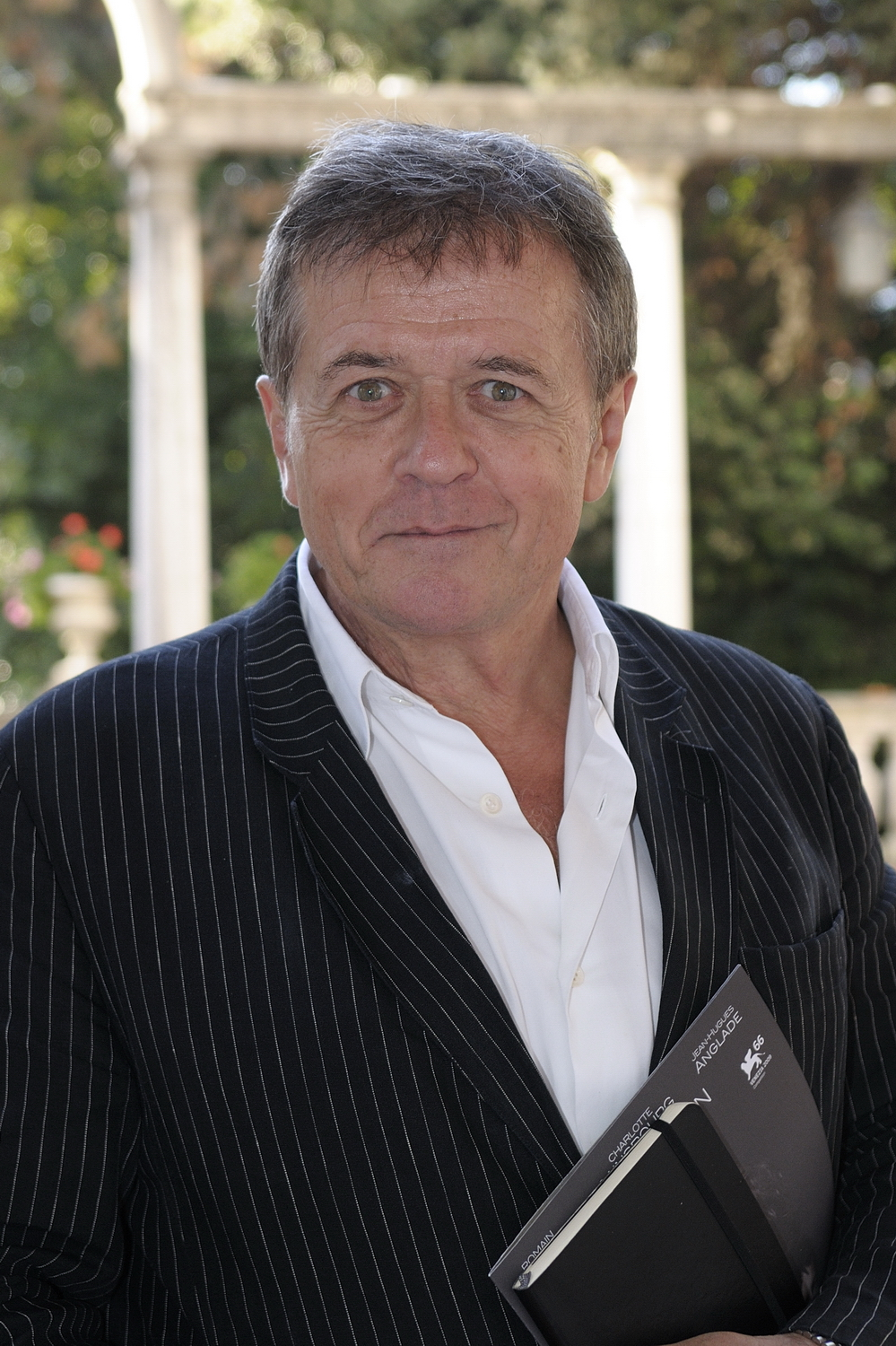
Patrice Chéreau, Jury President

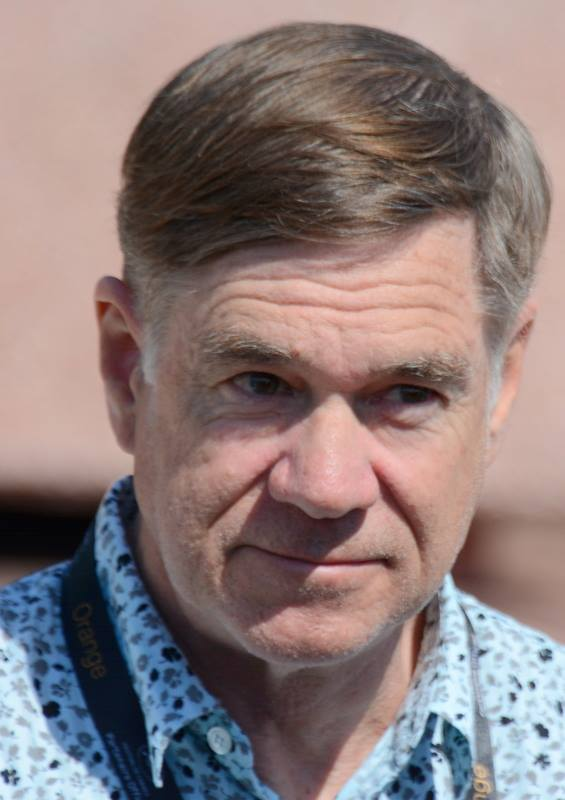
Gus Van Sant, Palme d'Or winner

=== In Competition ===
The following films and people received the 2003 Official selection awards:

- Palme d'Or: Elephant by Gus Van Sant
- Grand Prix: Uzak by Nuri Bilge Ceylan
- Best Director: Elephant by Gus Van Sant
- Best Screenplay: The Barbarian Invasions by Denys Arcand
- Best Actress: Marie-Josée Croze for The Barbarian Invasions
- Best Actor: Muzaffer Özdemir and Emin Toprak for Uzak
- Jury Prize: At Five in the Afternoon by Samira Makhmalbaf

=== Un Certain Regard ===
- Un Certain Regard Award: The Best of Youth by Marco Tullio Giordana
- Le Premier Regard Award: A Thousand Months by Faouzi Bensaïdi
- Un Certain Regard Jury Prize: Crimson Gold by Jafar Panahi

=== Cinéfondation ===
- First Prize: Run Rabbit Run by Pavle Vučković
- Second Prize: Historia del desierto by Celia Galan Julve
- Third Prize:
  - TV City by Alejandra Tomei and Alberto Couceiro
  - Rebeca a esas alturas by Luciana Jauffred Gorostiza

=== Caméra d'Or ===
- Reconstruction by Christoffer Boe
  - Special Mention: Osama by Siddiq Barmak

=== Short Films Competition ===
- Short Film Palme d'Or: Cracker Bag by Glendyn Ivin
- Short Film Jury Prize: L'homme sans tête by Juan Solanas

== Independent Awards ==
=== FIPRESCI Prizes ===
- The Hours of the Day by Jaime Rosales (Director's Fortnight)
- Father and Son by Alexander Sokurov (In competition)
- American Splendor by Shari Springer Berman, Robert Pulcini (Un Certain Regard)

=== Vulcan Award of the Technical Artist ===
- Tom Stern for cinematography in Mystic River

=== Prize of the Ecumenical Jury ===
- At Five in the Afternoon by Samira Makhmalbaf

=== Award of the Youth ===
- A Thousand Months by Faouzi Bensaïdi

=== Critics' Week ===
- International Critics' Week Grand Prix: Since Otar Left by Julie Bertuccelli
- Prix de la (Toute) Jeune Critique: Milwaukee, Minnesota by Allan Mindel
- Canal+ Award: Love Is the Law by Eivind Tolas
- Kodak Short Film Award: The Truth About the Head by Dale Heslip
- Young Critics Award – Best Short: The Truth About the Head by Dale Heslip
- Young Critics Award – Best Feature: Milwaukee, Minnesota by Allan Mindel
- Grand Golden Rail: Since Otar Left by Julie Bertuccelli
- Small Golden Rail: Love Is the Law by Eivind Tolas

=== Honorary Golden Palm ===
- Jeanne Moreau

=== Cinema Prize of the French National Education System ===
- Elephant by Gus Van Sant

=== Golden Coach ===
- Mystic River by Clint Eastwood

=== AFCAE Award ===
- Osama by Siddiq Barmak

=== François Chalais Award ===
- S-21: The Khmer Rouge Killing Machine by Rithy Panh

== Media ==
- INA: Opening of the 2003 Festival (commentary in French)
- INA: List of winners of the 2003 Festival and reactions (commentary in French)
