= Lê Thị Diễm Thúy =

American dramatist (born 1972)

- Born: 12 January 1972 (age 54); Phan Thiết, South Vietnam
- Occupations: Writer, performer
- Writing career
- Notable work: The Gangster We Are All Looking For

Lê Thị Diễm Thúy (Phan Thiết 12 January 1972; pronounced lay tee yim twee) is a Vietnamese American poet, novelist, and performer. Her pen name is lowercase: lê thị diễm thúy.

== Life ==
Lê was born in the South Vietnamese village of Phan Thiết on January 12, 1972, during the Vietnam War.

In 1978, Lê left her homeland alongside her father in a small fishing boat. They were picked up by an American naval ship and placed in a refugee camp in Singapore. She eventually resettled in Southern California with her father. They lived in Linda Vista, San Diego, in decaying 1940s–'50s Navy housing, which they shared with fellow Vietnamese, Cambodian and Laotian "boat people," immigrants displaced by war. Lê's mother and sister joined them two years later, via a camp in Malaysia. Two of Lê's siblings drowned during her childhood: her eldest brother drowned in the ocean in Vietnam when he was six, while a sister drowned in a Malaysian refugee camp. Lê adopted the name of her deceased sister after her father mistakenly reported her name when they were rescued at sea. She has four surviving siblings, two of whom were born in America.

Lê was inspired to write by her love of fairy tales. Reading a book of Grimms' Fairy Tales, she recalls, "I felt transported. Things happen very suddenly in fairy tales: A man puts on a cloak and vanishes. I could relate to that. Once I was somewhere and then I was here, and everything had vanished. I didn't take it as fantastic. I thought it was real."

She moved to Massachusetts in 1990 to enroll in Hampshire College, where she concentrated on cultural studies and post-colonial literature. She chose the school because of its individualized, multidisciplinary curriculum and her desire to get as far away from San Diego as possible. In 1993, Lê traveled to Paris to research French colonial postcards from the early 1900s–images of Vietnamese people taken by French photographers. Some of the images she collected would later appear in her performance work. It was in France that she solidified her identity as an American, with English as her preferred language. "Being in France and not hearing English every day," she says, "helped clarify how I hear English and carry it inside me."

On her return to Hampshire College, she wrote poems, prose, and pieces of dialog that would form the foundation for her senior thesis and first solo performance work Mua He Do Lua/Red Fiery Summer. After graduation, she traveled the United States from 1995 to 1997 performing her play Red Fiery Summer in community spaces and formal theaters.

In 1996, she was commissioned to write her second solo performance work, the bodies between us, which was subsequently produced by New WORLD Theater. In the same year, she published a prose piece entitled "The Gangster We Are All Looking For" in the Massachusetts Review. It was rerun in Harper's Magazine later that year, and caught the attention of literary agent Nicole Aragi, who urged Lê to expand the work into a novel. The unfinished book was picked up in 1999 by publisher Alfred A. Knopf.

In 1998, while working on her book, Lê returned to Vietnam for the first time in 20 years, with her mother. Her trip made her appreciate how much her parents had suffered when they settled in the United States. "It was profoundly sad for me," she says. "The most powerful thing was this [extended] family. I must have been related to 200 people there. I realized how isolated my parents must have felt, the extent of what they had lost and had never been able to regain." Her mother returned to Vietnam permanently in 2001 after she was diagnosed with cancer. She is buried in her home village of Phan Thiết. Le's father moved back to Vietnam in 2003.

Le was cited by The New York Times as one of its "Writers On The Verge" shortly before her novel, The Gangster We Are All Looking For, was published by Knopf (2003), to glowing reviews.

Her work has appeared in the Massachusetts Review, Harper's Magazine, and the anthology The Very Inside, and among her awards are Fellowships from the Radcliffe and Guggenheim foundations.

Her solo performance work includes Red Fiery Summer and The Bodies Between Us, which have been performed throughout the United States at venues including the Whitney Museum of American Art and the Vineyard Theater, as well as in Europe. While the former piece reflects many stories later included in The Gangster ..., Lê is currently basing her next novel on the latter.

I go about things in an oblique way. It's like a sidelong glance. This doesn't mean I don't like the sharp stab of directness — only that what I like more are all the moments leading up to that moment of directness or that expression of rage ... how long rage was silenced before it exploded and at what cost.

== Awards ==
- 2004 Guggenheim Fellowship
- 2008 USA Fellowship

== Sources ==
- Uno, Roberta. "Lê thị diễm thúy." Asian American Playwrights: A Bio-Bibliographical Critical Sourcebook. Ed. Miles Xian Liu. California: Greenwood Press, 2002, p. 170.
- La figure du réfugié dans la littérature de la diaspora vietnamienne en Amérique du Nord. Analyse des premiers romans de Lê Thi Diêm Thúy et de Kim Thúy, author: Sothea Chhum. Thesis, Université de Montréal 2016 online
