= Hollow City =

Hollow City may refer to:

- Hollow City (film), a 2004 Angolan film
- Hollow City (novel), a 2014 novel by Ransom Riggs
- The Hollow City, a location in the game The Elder Scrolls Online
