= New WORLD Theater =

American theatre company

New WORLD Theater (originally Third World Theater) was a nationally recognized company in-residence in the Fine Arts Center at the University of Massachusetts Amherst. Founded in 1979 by Roberta Uno, New WORLD Theater was dedicated to producing, presenting, and supporting works by artists of color. In addition to this artistic focus, New WORLD Theater's programming involved community engagement, scholarship, and education outreach. The program ended in 2009.

== Leadership and initiatives ==
New WORLD Theater had three Artistic Directors: Roberta Uno (1979–2002), Talvin Wilks (2002–2004), and Andrea Assaf (2004–09).

The mission of New WORLD Theater was to promote cultural equity and a social justice vision of a "new world" – one that embraced diverse cultural backgrounds, interdisciplinary approaches, and widespread geographic roots.

New WORLD Theater's programming included original productions and presented plays. The company also hosted performance residencies wherein artists created new works, made classroom and community appearances, provided classes, gave lectures and demonstrations, lead workshops, and hosted post-show talk-backs. Many of New WORLD Theater's signature projects involved professional artists and processes of extended community engagement.

== Original play development ==
In 1996, New WORLD Theater launched "New Works for a New World," a summer rehearsal residency focused on developing original and in-progress works by playwrights of color.

Resident artists included Guillermo Gomez Pena, Roberto Sifuentes, lê thi diem thúy, Chitra Divakaruni, Laurie Carlos, Marc Bamuthi Joseph, Dawn Akemi Saito, Coatlicue Colorado/the Colorado Sisters, Marlies Yearby, Sekou Sundiata, Alberto "Beto" Araiza, Aisha Rahman, Suheir Hammad, Rha Goddess, Rokafella, Kwikstep, D'Lo, Jorge Ignacio Cortiñas, Alice Tuan, Mildred Ruiz-Sapp, and Steven Sapp.

== Project 2050 ==
Inaugurated in July 2000, Project 2050 was a multi-year youth arts initiative built on the demographic projection that people of color would become the majority in the United States by 2050. The program brought together professional artists, youth communities from Western Massachusetts, scholars, and community activists to engage civic dialogue and create original performances based on selected themes.

Over a two-week period, youth participated in a series of daily workshops led by artists that include playwrighting, poetry, breakdancing, drumming, beatboxing, lyricism, singing, song writing, stepping, and visual art. Youth also attended daily "Knowledge for Power" sessions with scholars, and the program culminated in a performance.

Artist participants included Universes, Jorge Ignacio Cortiñas, Willie Perdomo, Regie Cabico, Rokafella and Kwikstep, Dipankar Mukherjee, Baba Israel, Rha Goddess, Kamilah Forbes, Magdalena Gomez, Alice Tuan, and Garland Farwell. Scholar/activist participants included Vijay Prashad, Khatharya Um, Frances Crowe, James Loewen, Augstin Lao Montes, Daniel Banks, and Jacqui Alexander.

== Conferences and convenings ==
Begun in 1998, Intersection was a biennial conference and festival that showcases new work by artists of color and involves a gathering of artists, educators, organizers, activists, practitioners, and presenters. The last conference took place in 2008.

== Suspension of operations/Archive initiative ==
In July 2009, the Fine Arts Center suspended New WORLD Theater's operations, citing economic challenges, although new grants were in place from the Nathan Cummings, Ford, and Surdna Foundations. Following a period of community protests and the absence of a planning process, the Nathan Cummings and Surdna Foundations grants were recalled. Remaining Ford Foundation funding was used to archive the theater's thirty-year history. New WORLD Theater's material archives are currently housed at the W.E.B. Du Bois Library at the University of Massachusetts Amherst.

In October 2010, the Nathan Cummings Foundation gathered many of NWT's former staff, artists, arts administrators, partners, and others in New York for a brainstorming session. The focus of the gathering was to preserve and activate New WORLD Theater's history. the major outcome is a two-year project between UMass Fine Arts Center and the Hemispheric Institute of Performance and Politics at New York University (HEMI) that will: (1) historically preserve and make publicly accessible a curated selection of significant videos from NWT through the Hemispheric Institute Digital Video Library (HIDVL); (2) digitize images, programs, ephemera, and other relevant materials to be permanently available online in a trilingual NWT Online Profile on HI's website.
