= Maria João =

Maria João may refer to:

- Maria João (singer) (born 1956), Portuguese singer
- Maria João (model) (born 1955), Brazilian model
- Maria João Abreu (1964–2021), Portuguese actress
- Maria João Bastos (born 1975), Portuguese actress
- María João Falcão (born 1964), Portuguese rhythmic gymnast
- Maria João Ganga, Angolan film director and screenwriter
- Maria João Koehler (born 1992), Portuguese tennis player
- Maria João Mira (born 1959), Portuguese screenwriter
- Maria João Pires (born 1944), Portuguese classical pianist
- Maria João Rodrigues (born 1955), Portuguese academic and politician
- Maria João Xavier (born 1971), Portuguese footballer
