= Palestine Cinema Days =

Film festival for Palestinian films

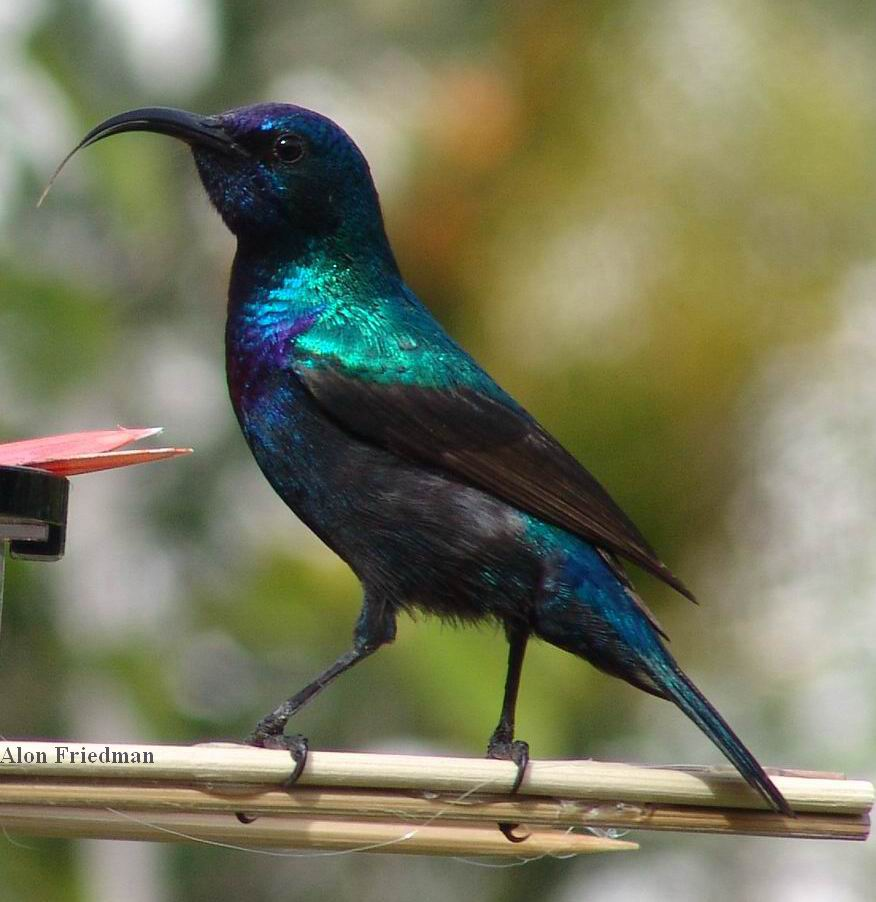
- Nectarinia osea, the Palestinian sunbird, represented on the award
- Location: Palestine
- Founded: 2014; 12 years ago
- Awards: Palestinian Sunbird Award, Sunbird Production Award, Masarat
- Website: https://pcd.flp.ps/

The Palestine Cinema Days is a film festival made by Film Lab Palestine—based in Ramalah, Palestine—which is held annually in November. It aims to bring Palestinian film and Arab cinema with topics surrounding Palestine, to the international scene. The festival also hosts film screenings, workshops, and panel discussions across Ramallah, Jerusalem, Bethlehem, Jenin, Haifa, Gaza City and Rafah, as well as internationally. It aims to bring both international and local film to areas of Palestine which have restricted freedom of movement.

== History ==
Palestine Cinema Days first organized in 2014 with the goal of screening films and introducing and discussing film with Palestinians. It also featured training programs and workshops to help teach growing filmmakers.

In 2016 the Palestinian Sunbird Award was created. In 2017 the Sunbird Production Award was introduced, to support production costs for filmmakers.

In 2022 it screened 58 films, having a subprogram called "Voicing Visual Memory", remembering Palestinian Liberation Organization (PLO) withdrawal from Beirut.

In 2023 the 10th festival was postponed weeks before its launch in November due to the Gaza War. Instead, the Palestine Cinema Days "Around the World" initiative was launched and became a global movement, with 171 screenings in 41 countries.

In 2024 the festival had 400 international screenings in almost 60 countries, continuing the "Around the World" initiative, and extending the reach of Palestinian cinema.

In 2025 the festival expanded further, with over 700 screenings in 94 countries. That year, it selected seven films to show:

- Divine Intervention
- Upshot, drama short film
- The Dupes
- A State of Passion, documentary about Ghassan Abu-Sittah, a British-Palestinian surgeon facing the Gaza War
- Jenin, Jenin
- When I Saw You
- Bye Bye Tiberias

== Festival awards ==
- The Palestinian Sunbird Award is given under the competition for short films, documentary feature films, and short film projects, awarding $5,000 for the documentary, and $3000 for the short film. It is named after the Palestinian sunbird, the national bird of Palestine since 2015, by the organization for having "an unbreakable will to survive."
- The Sunbird Production Award was made to help fund the production of films for Palestinian filmmakers, with an award of $10,000. Applications are evaluated by a board of three judges. It is funded via the sale of tickets, primarily bought by other producers, said to be a way to "cooperate and collect money for someone who has a film and wants to produce it," said Hanna Atallah, festival director and filmmaker.
- The Masarat are awards given to the best documentary and best short film, which are chosen by public voting, encouraging engagement with the audience.

== Board members ==
- Annemarie Jacir
- Emile Ashrawi
- Khaled Hourani
- Khaled Elayyan
- Dima Abu Ghosh
- Randa Salti-Huneidi
- Sally AbuBakr

== See also ==
- List of film festivals
