= Rahil (name) =

Rahil is a unisex given name and a surname. Notable people with the name include:

== Given name ==
=== Male ===
- Rahil Ahmed (born 1994), Dutch cricket player
- Rahil Azam (born 1981), Indian actor and model
- Rahil Gangjee (born 1978), Indian golf player
- Rahil Mammadov (born 1995), Azerbaijani football player
- Rahil Tandon, Indian actor

=== Female ===
- Rahil Ata (1826–1894), Lebanese educator and translator
- Rahil Hesan (born 1978), Iranian Emirati fashion designer

== Surname ==
- Nezha Rahil, Moroccan actress
