= Volubilis (film) =

2017 French-Moroccan film

- Directed by: Faouzi Bensaïdi
- Written by: Faouzi Bensaïdi
- Produced by: Saïd Hamich Benlarbi; Faouzi Bensaïdi
- Starring: Mouhcine Malzi, Nadia Kounda, Abdelhadi Talbi, Nezha Rahil
- Cinematography: Marc-André Batigne
- Release date: 2017
- Running time: 106 minutes
- Countries: France; Morocco

Volubilis is a 2017 French-Moroccan film directed by Faouzi Bensaïdi. It was screened at a number of international film festivals.

== Cast ==
- Nadia Kounda
- Mouhcine Malzi
- Abdelhadi Talbi
- Nezha Rahil
- Mouna Fettou
- Faouzi Bensaïdi

== Awards and accolades ==
Volubilis was presented at the Giornate degli Autor/Venice Days section at the 2017 Venice Film Festival. It won the Tanit de bronze at the 2017 Carthage Film Festival. Nadia Kounda won Best Actress at the El Gouna Film Festival for her performance in the film. It was also screened at the 2017 Festival du Nouveau Cinéma in Montréal.
