= Emily Jacir =

Palestinian-American artist and filmmaker

- Born: 1970 (age 55–56); Bethlehem, Palestine
- Education: University of Dallas; Memphis College of Art

Emily Jacir (Arabic: أملي جاسر) (1972) is a Palestinian artist and filmmaker based in Bethlehem, Palestine.

== Early life and education ==
Emily Jacir was born in 1972, grew up in Saudi Arabia and attended high school in Italy. She graduated with an undergraduate degree in art from the University of Dallas in Irving, Texas. She then received her MFA in Memphis College of Art. In 1998, she attended the Whitney Independent Study Program in New York City. She divides her time between New York City and Bethlehem.

== Work and career ==
Jacir is a multidisciplinary artist whose primary interest lies in transformation, resistance and silenced historical narratives. She works in a variety of media including film, photography, installation, performance, video, writing, and sound. She draws on the artistic medium of concept art and social intervention as a framework for her pieces, in which she focuses on themes of displacement, exile, and resistance, primarily within the context of Palestinian occupation.

She has exhibited throughout the Americas, Europe, and the Middle East since 1994, holding solo exhibitions in New York City, Los Angeles, Ramallah, Beirut, London, and Linz.

Active in the building of Ramallah's art scene since 1999, Jacir has worked with the A. M. Qattan Foundation, Al Ma'mal Foundation for Contemporary Art and the Sakakini Cultural Center. She has been involved in projects and events such as Birzeit University's Virtual Art Gallery. She also founded and curated the first International Video Festival in Ramallah in 2002.

She curated a selection of shorts, Palestinian Revolution Cinema (1968–1982), which went on tour in 2007. Between 2000 and 2002 she curated several Arab film programs in NYC with Alwan for the Arts, including the first Palestinian Film Festival in 2002.

She has worked as a full-time professor at the International Academy of Art Palestine since it opened in 2006 and served on its academic board from 2006 through 2012. Jacir led the first year of the Ashkal Alwan Home Workspace Program in Beirut (2011–2012) and created the curriculum and programming after serving on the founding year of the Curricular Committee from 2010 to 2011. She is the founding director of Dar Yusuf Nasri Jacir for Art and Research in her family home in Bethlehem, which serves as both a community centre and a contemporary art space.

Mural in Palermo, part of the Ex Libris exhibition by Emily Jacir

In February 2023, Jacir collaborated with artist Baha Hilo, a native Palestinian and Sociology graduate of Birzeit University, to create his project "Preserve", which focuses on the preservation and repair of the olive terraces at Dar Jacir, an arts and education center in Bethlehem. The project was supported by the Center for Human Rights and the Arts.

== Awards and honors ==
- On 17 October 2007 Jacir won the Leone d'Oro a un artista under 40 (Golden Lion for artists under 40) at the 52nd Venice Biennale for "a practice that takes as its subject exile in general and the Palestinian issue in particular".
- Jacir was the recipient of the 2007 Prince Claus Award, an annual prize from the Prince Claus Fund for Culture and Development, The Hague, which described Jacir as "an exceptionally talented artist whose works seriously engage the implications of conflict."
- Jacir was the winner of the 2008 Hugo Boss Prize by the Solomon R. Guggenheim Foundation. The jury noted that she won the award for her "rigorous conceptual practice—comprising photography, video, performance, and installation-based work—bears witness to a culture torn by war and displacement."
- Jacir was the Visual Arts winner of the 2011 Herb Alpert Award in the Arts.
- In 2015 she was awarded the Andrew W. Mellon Foundation Rome Prize Fellow in Visual Arts, American Academy in Rome.
- In 2018 Jacir won the "Curator of the Young Artist of the Year" award from the A.M. Qattan Foundation.
- In 2019 She gave the Edward Said Memorial Lecture at Princeton University Emily Jacir: "Where We Come From"
- In 2023 she received an American Academy Arts and Letters Award in Art from Arts and Letters Awards in Art, New York.
- In 2023 Jacir was awarded an honorary doctorate in art and design by the National College of Art and Design, Dublin.
- In 2024 she was awarded the Minimum Prize from Fondazione Pistoletto, Italy.

== Recent juries ==
- 2024 Herb Alpert Award Panelist in the Visual Arts, USA
- 2022 Jury Platform Commissions, EVA International, Ireland.
- 2021 UNESCO Sharjah Prize for Arab Culture
- 2021 Herb Alpert Award Panelist in the Visual Arts, USA
- 2020 UNESCO Sharjah Prize for Arab Culture
- 2016 through 2020 Rockefeller Foundation Bellagio Residency Jury, Italy
- 2019 German Competition 35th International Jury Kurzfilm Hamburg
- 2019 UNESCO Sharjah Prize for Arab Culture
- 2017 Sunbird Award Competition for Short Narrative Films, Days of Cinema Festival, Ramallah
- 2017 Herb Alpert Award Panelist in the Visual Arts, USA
- 2014 Juror for Visions du Reel Festival International de Cinema, Nyon
- 2013 International Jury, Lampedusa InFestival V Edition, Film festival, Lampedusa, Italy
- 2012 Cda-Projects Grant for Artistic Research and Production, Istanbul, Turkey
- 2012 Berlinale Shorts Film Jury, Germany
- 2012 CinemaXXI Jury, Rome Film Festival, Italy
- 2010 A.M. Qattan Young Artist Award Juror, Ramallah

== Major works ==
=== Memorial to 418 Palestinian Villages Destroyed, Depopulated, and Occupied by Israel in 1948 (2001) ===
Developed during her residency at P.S.1's National Studio Program, Jacir opened her studio to Palestinians, Israelis, Americans, Egyptians, Syrians, Yemenis, Spaniards and others to embroider a refugee tent with the names of Palestinian villages impacted by Israeli expansion.

"Memorial to 418 Palestinian Villages is mobile and vulnerable—resisting any false appeals to closure. It is not a didactic monument, but a sensitive, painful testament to a desperate tragedy that needs to be addressed and aches to be mourned."

=== Where We Come From (2001-2003) ===
Jacir, holder of an American passport, asked more than 30 Palestinians living both abroad and within the occupied territories: “If I could do anything for you, anywhere in Palestine, what would it be?” She collected responses and carried out tasks in an extended performance of wish-fulfilment by proxy, using her American passport to travel between territories, a privilege most Palestinians do not hold. Some of the tasks included playing football, eating local foods, paying bills, visiting a grave, meeting relatives or loved ones, etc. The details of the series's display were deliberate: within a simple, black frame, parallel text in Arabic and English listed the exact request, described the requestor's current location and situation in regards to movement, their name, and finally, notes on the completion of the task. Adjacent to this frame were the accompanying photographs of the artist carrying out the task, unframed, and printed larger than the text panels.

This curatorial decision is explained through the idea that "viewers face a project that is first of all divided between text panels and photographs. But how to get from one to the other? The visual transition from language to image seems simple enough. A mere shift of the eyes will do... Yet it is just this translation, written out in clear language and then realized photographically, that for many is insurmountable... [it] represents an unbridgeable chasm, an impossibility on which a complex of desire is built."

The documented result was shown in New York to great critical acclaim; "Where We Come From is [Jacir's] best so far. An art of cool Conceptual surfaces and ardent, intimate gestures, intensely political and beyond polemic, it adds up to one of the most moving gallery exhibitions I've encountered this season." Other reactions expressed "that her efforts resonated with the aspects of desire, fear and restricted movement." Where We come From was also positively reviewed by Edward Said.

The work was acquired by San Francisco Museum of Modern Art, which added an extra text to Jacirs work.

Frieze named the work No.13 of "The 25 Best Works of the 21st Century".

=== Crossing Surda (2003) ===
"“Crossing Surda” (a record of going to and from work), exists because an Israeli soldier threatened me and put an M-16 into my temple. [Ms. Jacir says she was filming her feet with a video camera at a checkpoint that day.] If I had not had this direct threatening experience this piece would not exist."

=== Accumulations (2005) ===
"Ms. Jacir's deft extrapolation of the issues of identity from the specifics of experience, like her renewal and extension of what might be called classic Conceptual Art, is enormously impressive."

=== Material for a film (2005-ongoing) ===
"In Material for a Film (2005–ongoing) the displacement is total, as Jacir’s own identity is substituted for that of her subject, Wael Zuaiter, a Palestinian intellectual living in Rome who was assassinated in 1972 by Israeli agents, having been mistakenly identified as one of those responsible for the murder of Israeli athletes at the 1972 Olympics in Munich. The installation gathers together photographs, books, music, letters, interviews, telegrams, copies of the Italian magazine Rivoluzione Palestinese to which Zuaiter contributed, even a clip from a Pink Panther film in which he had a small part, to flesh out a life no longer there."

"Jacir is an artist, who at the beginning of her career for less than a decade, focused on her Hugo Boss Prize exhibition and for that focused only on character Wael Zuaiter, a Palestinian intellectual killed by Israeli secret service agents following the murder of eleven Israeli athletes and a German police officer by the militant group Black September at the 1972 Munich Olympics."

Howard Halle criticized the pieces in an article in Time Out New York, writing, "That such a crude, self-indulgent exercise has been given one of contemporary art’s most prestigious awards is unfortunate, though not, sadly, entirely unexpected." Another critique by Ken Johnson of The New York Times said that, "If the ultimate point is to arouse humane concern for Palestinians in general, Ms. Jacir's work falls short."

- Emily Jacir: "Material for a film": Retracing Wael Zuaiter (Part 1), installation in the 2007 La Biennale di Venezia
- Emily Jacir: "Material for a film": A performance (Part 2), 16 July 2007, The Electronic Intifada
  - Najwan Darwis: Emily Jacir's Material for a Film: Ongoing homage and artistic revenge for Wa’el Zuaiter

=== Retracing bus no.23 on the historic Jerusalem-Hebron Road (2006) ===
- Emily Jacir, Photostory: Retracing bus no. 23 on the historic Jerusalem-Hebron Road, 15 December 2006, The Electronic Intifada

=== stazione (2009) ===
In 2009, Jacir participated in the Venice Biennale in the Palestinian Pavilion. She created a site-specific public project to take place in Venice during the Biennale. The Venice City Authorities shut down Jacir's project and refused to allow it to take place.

"Significant by its absence at the Venice Biennale was Emily Jacir's contribution to the official off-site exhibition, 'Palestine c/o Venice'. Jacir's artwork, Stazione, would have seen all of the piers for the Route 1 water bus (the vaporetto that runs up and down the Grand Canal) display the stop location names in Arabic as well as the usual Italian. Mockups were made, the Biennale approved, the council approved and the vaporetto company that runs Route 1 approved. Then suddenly it didn't. Apparently the vaporetto company stopped the project, and all the artist could find out, second-hand, was that they had 'received pressure from an outside source to shut it down for political reasons'."

"Emily Jacir’s stazione (2008 - 2009) is an unrealised intervention on the number 1 vaporetto (water bus) line, a main transport route along the Grand Canal beginning at Lido winding its way to Piazzale Roma, ferrying audiences from one Biennale exhibition to another, by inserting Arabic text supplementing the existing Italian names at vaporetti stops and thus making the route bilingual. In the artist’s explanation, the work references the numerous Arab influences and exchanges in the history of Venice, its architecture, manufacturing, shipping, and of course in the process of these activities, language - that Arabic words too have filtered into the Venetian dialect - ‘divan’, ‘damasco’, ‘gabella’, amongst others."

=== Museums ===
Museums where her work has been shown:

- CCS Hessel Museum of Contemporary Art at Bard College
- Herbert F. Johnson Museum of Art at Cornell University
- Khalil Sakakini Cultural Center in Ramallah
- Palazzo delle Papesse in Siena, Italy, nella mostra 'System Error: war is a force that gives us meanings'
- Modern Art Oxford
- Musee cantonal des Beaux-Arts de Lausanne [Cantonal Museum of Fine Arts, Lausanne, Switzerland]
- Museum of Modern Art in New York
- Museum of Modern Art in San Francisco
- Whitechapel Gallery
- Whitney Museum of American Art

The main gallery in the US that shows her work is Alexander and Bonin in NYC (212.367.7474)

=== Biennales ===
International biennales which have featured her work:

- 2013 Venice Biennale in Venice, Italy
- dOCUMENTA (13) (2012) in Kassel, Germany
- 2011 Venice Biennale in Venice, Italy
- 2011 Sharjah Biennial in Sharjah, United Arab Emirates
- 2009 Venice Biennale in Venice, Italy
- 2007 Venice Biennale in Venice, Italy, where she was awarded the 'Leone d'Oro a un artista under 40'
- 2006 Sydney Biennale in Sydney, Australia
- 2005 Venice Biennale in Venice, Italy
- 2005 Sharjah Biennial in Sharjah, United Arab Emirates
- 2004 Whitney Biennial at the Whitney Museum of American Art in New York City, United States
- The 2004 Gwangju Biennale in Gwangju, Korea.
- 2003 Istanbul Biennial in Istanbul, Turkey

== Articles (partial list) ==
- Kirsty Bell, Another Country April 2008, Frieze
- Report, The Electronic Intifada Artist Emily Jacir Awarded Prestigious Golden Lion
- TJ Demos, “Emily Jacir: Poetry’s Beyond,” Hugo Boss Prize 2008 (New York: Guggenheim Museum, 2008)
- Emily Jacir, Anton Sinkewich, Oz Shelach: BATTLE CRY Boycott of all Israeli Art Institutions 7 April 2002, Israel Imperial News
- Emily Jacir, Ali La Pointe and Zena's words on the New York streets, 28 July 2006, The Electronic Intifada
- Emily Jacir, A Tale of Two Sisters: Witnessing an Undercover Israeli Operation in Ramallah (2), 15 November 2006, The Electronic Intifada
- Emily Jacir, Palestinian Revolution Cinema Comes to NYC, 16 February 2007, The Electronic Intifada
- Desire in Diaspora: Emily Jacir, Art Journal (62)

== Bibliography ==
- "Emily Jacir" (Document). Verlag Fur Moderne Kunst Nurnberg. 2008.
- "Emily Jacir" (Document). O.K. Books. 2003.
- Jacir, Emily (2008). A. Laidi-Hanieh (ed.). Some things I probably should not say and some things I should have said (fragments of a diary). Cercle d’Art, Paris.
