= New York Arab & South Asian Film Festival =

Film festival (New York, USA)

New York Arab & South Asian Film Festival (NYASAFF) features premieres, documentaries and short films from 25 countries in North Africa, the Middle East, South Asia, and their diasporas. The mission of the festival is to increase awareness of the creative vitality and sociopolitical realities of North Africa, the Middle East, South Asia, and their diasporas.

== History ==
The New York Arab & South Asia Film Festival (NYASAFF) was started in 2003 by Ahmed Issawi and in the beginning, only featured Arab films. It later expanded and included cinema from the rest of the Middle East and South Asia. It was organized by the arts and culture organization Alwan for the Arts based in New York City. The screenings are presented in notable film venues such as: Tribeca Cinemas, Columbia University, Art in General, Cantor Film Center at NYU, and Two Boots Pioneer Theatre. The Film Festival was suspended in 2008, by which point it had grown to become the largest such event outside of the Middle East. The festival is planned to resume in 2012.

In October 2010, Alwan for the Arts and 3rd i organized the New York Arab & South Asian Short Video Slam where they called for submissions by South Asian and Arab directors or submissions of videos about those regions and their diasporas by filmmakers of all backgrounds. Videos of all genre were welcomed, as well as conceptual and political video art. The works of the winners of the Short Video Slam were screened at Alwan's space in downtown New York.

== Sponsors ==
The New York Arab & South Asian Film Festival is partially sponsored by the Lower Manhattan Cultural Council with the support of The September 11th Fund, as well as the Columbia University Department of Middle East, South Asian, and African Studies, The School of the Arts Film Division, and the Department of Anthropology, The Arab Film Festival Rotterdam, The Tunisian Cultural & Information Center, Egypt Air, and the Arab American Family Support Center. Additional Support from Sankalpa Media, Design Evolution, Deep Dish TV, Earseph Enterprises, Rush Graphics, NYU A/P/A Studies & Institute, Le Souk Restaurant, Damascus Bakery, Sangam Entertainment, RunRon Entertainment Inc., Thatch Caye Resort, Candela, Candela Restaurant, Media Sponsors include: Village Voice, indieWIRE, Rotana TV, Dandana TV, Egyptian National Film Center, Syrian Cinema Foundation, and Arab Radio and Television (ART), Egypt.
