= Stolen Life (2005 film) =

2005 Chinese film directed by Li Shaohong

- DVD cover
- Simplified Chinese: 生死劫
- Hanyu Pinyin: Shēngsǐ jié
- Directed by: Li Shaohong
- Written by: Liao Yimei
- Based on: Life and Death Plunder by An Dun
- Produced by: Gao Xiaoping; Li Shaohong; Li Xiaowan; Tan Xiangjiang
- Starring: Zhou Xun; Wu Jun
- Cinematography: Gao Hu; Zeng Nianping
- Edited by: Yan Wu
- Music by: Qu Bo
- Production company: Arc Light Films
- Distributed by: Global Film Initiative
- Release date: April 23, 2005 (United States)
- Running time: 90 minutes
- Country: China
- Language: Mandarin

Stolen Life (Chinese: 生死劫; pinyin: Shēngsǐ jié), also known as Life and Death Plunder, is a 2005 Chinese drama film directed by Li Shaohong, and starring Zhou Xun and Wu Jun. Both this and Shaohong's previous film Baober in Love star Zhou Xun in the lead role. The film had its world premiere at the 2005 Tribeca Film Festival, where it won the Best Narrative Feature award. It was also an official selection of the prestigious, award-winning Global Lens Collection 2006, presented by the Global Film Initiative. Stolen Life was released on April 23, 2005.

== Plots ==
In Li Shaohong's acclaimed coming-of-age drama, a teenage girl is taken to live with her aunt and grandmother in Beijing. Yan'ni (played by acclaimed Chinese actress Zhou Xun) is withdrawn and reclusive, believing that she has been abandoned by her parents and has no control over her fate. The fact that her extended family doesn't have much hope for her future only compounds her depression. Surprising everyone in her hostile household, Yan'ni is accepted to college. But as she prepares to embark on her new life of higher education, an encounter with a delivery boy triggers a series of unexpected events that will change her life forever.

== Cast ==
- Zhou Xun as Yan'ni (胭妮; Yān'nī)
  - When Yan'ni decides not to kill Muyu, Xiaoping Lin, author of Children of Marx and Coca-Cola: Chinese Avant-Garde Art and Independent Cinema, states that she made "a triumph of a common humanity that finally sets her free from Muyu's shadow and its dark future."
- Wu Jun (吴军; 吳軍; Wú Jūn) as Muyu (木玉; Mùyù)
  - Muyu's parents were not married and therefore he was born out of wedlock. Muyu makes money from his deceptive romantic relationships. Xiaoping Lin compared Muyu to Lenox Sanderson of Way Down East. According to Lin, the film does not state that Muyu ever faces adverse consequences.
- Cai Ming
- Su Xiaoming
- Peiyi Wang
- Jianong Sun
- Yan Ni as Sichuan woman

== Awards and nominations ==
Year	Award	Category	Recipients	Result	Notes
2005	Tribeca Film Festival	Best Narrative Feature	Stolen Life	Won	
2005	International Film Festival of Kerala	Golden Crow Pheasant for Best Film	Stolen Life	Won	

== Reception ==
Janice Page of the Boston Globe wrote that "This one hits home in places, but overall it begs for a lighter touch."
