= The Hours of the Day =

- Film poster
- Spanish: Las horas del día
- Directed by: Jaime Rosales
- Screenplay by: Jaime Rosales; Enric Rufas
- Produced by: Jaime Rosales; Ricard Figueras
- Starring: Alex Brendemühl; Vicente Romero; María Antonia Martínez; Àgata Roca; Pape Monsoriu
- Cinematography: Óscar Durán
- Edited by: Nino Martínez
- Production companies: Fresdeval Films; In Vitro Films
- Distributed by: Nirvana Films
- Release dates: 19 May 2003 (Cannes); 6 June 2003 (Spain)
- Country: Spain
- Language: Spanish

The Hours of the Day (Spanish: Las horas del día) is a 2003 Spanish drama film directed by Jaime Rosales (in his feature film debut) from a screenplay by Rosales and Enric Rufas which stars Alex Brendemühl.

== Plot ==
The plot follows the daily life of a killer living with his mother in El Prat de Llobregat.

== Cast ==
- Alex Brendemühl as Abel
- Àgata Roca as Tere
- María Antonia Martínez as madre de Abel
- Vicente Romero as Marcos
- Pape Monsoriu as Trini
- Irene Belza as Carmen
- Anna Sahun as María
- Isabel Rocatti as taxista
- Armando Aguirre as señor mayor

== Production ==
The film is a Fresdeval Films and In Vitro Films production. Shooting locations included El Prat de Llobregat.

== Release ==
The film premiered in the Directors' Fortnight independent section of the 56th Cannes Film Festival's in May 2003. Distributed by Nirvana Films, it was released theatrically in Spain on 6 June 2003, grossing €191,967 (38,821 admissions).

== Reception ==
Lisa Nesselson of Variety assessed that the film "boasts a crisp sense of observation in the service of a story many will judge aimless".

Nuria Vidal of Fotogramas rated the film 4 out of 5 stars, considering that instead of "good" and "bad" characters, intrigue or investigation or psychology and explanations, "there is a good dose of pure cinema" within.

== Accolades ==
Year	Award	Category	Nominee(s)	Result	Ref.
2004	18th Goya Awards	Best Original Screenplay	Jaime Rosales, Enric Rufas	Nominated	
2004	18th Goya Awards	Best New Director	Jaime Rosales	Nominated	

== See also ==
- List of Spanish films of 2003
