= Suheir Hammad =

American poet, author, and political activist

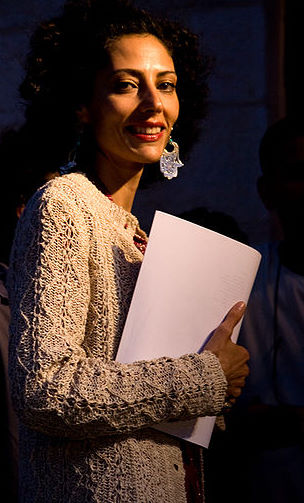
- Suheir Hammad in 2009
- Born: October 25, 1973 (age 53); Amman, Jordan

Suheir Hammad (Arabic: سهير حماد) (born October 25, 1973) is a Palestinian-American poet, author, and political activist.

== Biography ==
She was born in Amman, Jordan. Her parents were Palestinian refugees who immigrated along with their daughter to Brooklyn, New York City when she was five years old. Her parents later moved to Staten Island.

As an adolescent growing up in Brooklyn, Hammad was heavily influenced by Brooklyn's hip-hop scene. She had also absorbed the stories from her parents and grandparents of life in their hometown of Lydda, before the 1948 Palestinian expulsion and flight, and of the suffering they endured afterward, first in the Gaza Strip and then in Jordan. From these disparate influences Hammad was able to weave into her work a common narrative of dispossession, not only in her capacity as an immigrant, a Palestinian and a Muslim, but as a woman struggling against society's inherent sexism and as a poet in her own right.

When hip-hop entrepreneur Russell Simmons came across her piece entitled "First Writing Since", a poem describing her reaction to the September 11 attacks, he signed her to a deal with HBO's Def Poetry Jam. She recited original works on tour for the following two years. In 2008, she was cast in her first fiction role in cinema, the Palestinian film Salt of this Sea (2008) by Annemarie Jacir, which premiered as an official selection in the Un Certain Regard competition of the Cannes Film Festival. She is now working on her third publication which will be a book of prose. She took part in the Bush Theatre's 2011 project Sixty Six Books, for which she wrote a piece based upon the Book of Haggai in the King James Bible.

== Film and video ==
- Lest We Forget (2003) – Narrator
- The Fourth World War (2004) – Narrator
- Salt of this Sea (2008) – Soraya
- When I Stretch Forth Mine Hand (2009) – Verses by
- Things Fall Apart (2010) - Guest Speaker
- Into Egypt (2011) – Writer and Performer

== Produced plays ==
- breaking letter (s) (2008), New WORLD Theater
- Blood Trinity (2002), The New York Hip Hop Theater Festival
- ReOrientalism (2003)
- Libretto by Suheir Hammad

== Awards ==
- The Audre Lorde Writing Award, Hunter College (1995, 2000)
- The Morris Center for Healing Poetry Award (1996)
- New York Mills Artist Residency (1998)
- Van Lier Fellowship (1999)
- The 2001 Emerging Artist Award, Asian/Pacific/American Studies Institute at NYU
- Tony Award – Special Theatrical Event – original cast member and writer for Russell Simmons Presents Def Poetry Jam on Broadway (2003)
- Suheir is also a talent associate for the Peabody Award-winning HBO show Russell Simmons Presents Def Poetry (2003)
- The 2009 American Book Awards

== Works ==
- Born Palestinian, Born Black. Harlem River Press, 1996, ISBN 0-86316-244-4. Reprinted by UpSet Press, 2010, ISBN 9780976014225.
- Drops of This Story Harlem River Press, 1996.
- Zaatar Diva Cypher Books, 2006, ISBN 1-892494-67-1
- Breaking Poems Cypher Books, 2008, ISBN 978-0-9819131-2-4

== Periodicals ==
- The Amsterdam News
- Black Renaissance/Renaissance Noire
- Brilliant Corners
- Clique
- Drum Voices Revue
- Essence
- Long Shot
- Atlanta Review
- Bomb
- Brooklyn Bridge
- Fierce
- STRESS Hip-Hop Magazine
- Quarterly Black Review of Books
- Color Lines
- Spheric
- The Olive Tree Review
- The Hunter Envoy
- Meridians
- Mizna
- Signs

== Anthologies ==
- In Defense of Mumia (Writers and Readers)
- New to North America (Burning Bush Press)
- The Space Between Our Footsteps (Simon & Schuster)
- Identity lessons (Penguin)
- Listen Up! (Ballantine)
- Post Gibran: Anthology of New Arab-American Writing (Jusoor Press)
- Becoming American (Hyperion)
- Bum Rush the Page (Three Rivers Press)
- The Poetry of Arab Women (Interlink Books)
- Voices for Peace (Scribner)
- Another World is Possible (Subway & Elevated Press)
- 33 Things Every Girl Should Know About Women’s History (Crown)
- Trauma at Home (Bison Press)
- Sing, Whisper, Shout, Pray!; Feminist Visions for a Just World (Edge Work)
- Russell Simmons Presents Def Poetry Jam on Broadway (Atria)
- Short Fuse, The Global Anthology of New Fusion Poetry, edited by Swift & Norton; (Rattapallax Press)
- Word. On Being a (Woman) Writer, edited by Jocelyn Burrell; (The Feminist Press)

== Additional resources ==
- Hanna, S. M. "Suheir Hammad's Negotiated Historiography of Arab America." Philology 61.1(2014): 44–71.
- Harb, Sirène. "Naming Oppressions, Representing Empowerment: June Jordan's and Suheir Hammad's Poetic Projects." Feminist Formations 26.3 (2014): 71–99.
- Hartman, Michelle. "‘A Debke Beat Funky as P.E.’s Riff’: Hip Hop Poetry and Politics in Suheir Hammad's Born Palestinian, Born Black". Black Arts Quarterly 7.1 (2002): 6–8. Print.
- Harb, Sirène. "Transformative Practices and Historical Revision: Suheir Hammad’s Born Palestinian, Born Black". Studies in the Humanities 35.1 (June 2008): 34–49.
- Hopkinson, Natalie. "Out of the Ashes, Drops of Meaning: The Poetic Success of Suheir Hammad". The Washington Post, 13 October 2002
- Oumlil, Kenza. "'Talking Back': The Poetry of Suheir Hammad". Feminist Media Studies 13.5 (2013): 850–859.
