= Charlie: The Life and Art of Charles Chaplin =

- Film poster
- Directed by: Richard Schickel
- Written by: Richard Schickel
- Produced by: Richard Schickel; Bryan McKenzie; Ann Ruark; Douglas Freeman
- Narrated by: Sydney Pollack
- Cinematography: Thomas Albrecht; Kris Denton; Simon Fanthorpe; Rob Goldie; John Halliday; Ross Keith; Graham Smith
- Edited by: Bryan McKenzie
- Production company: Lorac Productions
- Distributed by: Warner Bros.
- Release dates: May 25, 2003 (Cannes Film Festival); February 13, 2004 (United States)
- Running time: 132 minutes
- Country: United States
- Language: English

Charlie: The Life and Art of Charles Chaplin is a 2003 American biographical documentary film written and directed by film critic Richard Schickel. The film explores the personal and professional life of the British actor, comedian and filmmaker, Charlie Chaplin, as well as his legacy and influence. It is narrated by Sydney Pollack along with many Hollywood personalities appearing in the film talking about Chaplin, including Robert Downey Jr., Norman Lloyd, Bill Irwin, Woody Allen, Johnny Depp, Richard Attenborough, Martin Scorsese, Miloš Forman, Marcel Marceau, David Raksin, Claire Bloom, David Thomson, Andrew Sarris, Jeanine Basinger and Chaplin's children Geraldine, Michael and Sydney Chaplin. The documentary also benefits from insight from key Chaplin biographers David Robinson and Jeffrey Vance.

It premiered at the 2003 Cannes Film Festival and also served as the closing night film on May 25, 2003.

== Synopsis ==
In chronological order, the documentary explores the work of Charlie Chaplin and sheds light on the controversies related to his personal life.

== Reception ==
Upon its Cannes premiere, the film received generally positive reviews. Review aggregator Rotten Tomatoes reports that 95% of 19 film critics have given the film a positive review, with a rating average of 7.5 out of 10. On Metacritic, which assigns a weighted mean rating out of 100 reviews from film critics, the film holds an average score of 80, based on 8 reviews, indicating a 'generally favorable' response.

Allan Hunter in his review for Screendaily, called the film "A straightforward mixture of talking heads and extensive film clips, it is a comprehensive beginners guide to the subject." Megan Lehmann from the New York Post said that "It is crammed to the gills with a fine selection of the beloved comic's best work, with talking-head commentary serving to deepen and enrich the enjoyment." Owen Gleiberman writing a positive review for Entertainment Weekly said that "The nature of silent comedy was to elevate its heroes into myths, but after Charlie I can't wait to see Chaplin's movies again, this time to glimpse the man on the other side of the icon." David Stratton of Variety described the film that it is "A thoroughly researched and extremely informative survey of the life and work of one of the great figures of world cinema, Richard Schickel's Charlie: The Life and Art of Charles Chaplin is a must for lovers of cinema."
