= Salt of this Sea =

- Milh Hadha Al-Bahr
- Directed by: Annemarie Jacir
- Written by: Annemarie Jacir
- Produced by: Jacques Bidou; Marianne Dumoulin
- Starring: Suheir Hammad; Saleh Bakri
- Cinematography: Benoît Chamaillard
- Edited by: Michèle Hubinon
- Music by: Kamran Rastegar
- Production companies: Rotana Film Production; JBA Production; Philistine Films; Thelma Film AG; Louverture Films; Clarity World Films; Augustus Films; TSR; Mediapro
- Distributed by: Rotana Studios; Pyramide Distribution
- Release date: May 16, 2008 (Cannes)
- Running time: 109 min.
- Countries: France; Israel; Palestine; United States; Netherlands; Spain; Belgium; Switzerland
- Language: Arabic

Salt of this Sea (Arabic: ملح هذا البحر, romanized: Milh hadha al-bahr) is a 2008 Palestinian film directed by Annemarie Jacir and was an Official Selection of the Cannes International Film Festival in 2008. It is Palestine's submission to the 81st Academy Awards for the Academy Award for Best Foreign Language Film. The film stars Palestinian-American poet Suheir Hammad as Soraya, an American-born Palestinian woman, who heads to Israel and Palestine on a quest to reclaim her family's home and money that were taken during the 1948 Arab-Israeli War. A young Saleh Bakri also stars in the film in his first role in an Arab film.

== Awards ==
- FIPRESCI PRIZE - INTERNATIONAL CRITICS AWARD

International Federation of Film Critics, 2008

- FIRST PRIZE - BEST FILM

Sguardi Altrove Film Festival, Italy 2009

- SPECIAL JURY PRIZE

Osians Asian & Arab Film Festival, 2008

- BEST FIRST FILM

Traverse City Film Festival, 2009

- SPECIAL JURY PRIZE

Oran International Festival of Arab Cinema, 2009

- RANDA CHAHAL PRIZE

Journées cinématographiques de Carthage, 2008

- BEST SCREENPLAY

Dubai International Film Festival, 2008

- BEST OF FEST SELECT

Minneapolis St. Paul International Film Festival 2009

- AUDIENCE CHOICE AWARD

Houston Palestine Film Festival, 2009

- AUDIENCE CHOICE AWARD - BEST FEATURE

Chicago Palestine Film Festival, 2009

- HONORABLE MENTION

Cairo Refugee Film Festival, 2009

- AUDIENCE CHOICE RUNNER UP

Toronto Palestine Film Festival, 2008

- PALESTINE'S OFFICIAL OSCAR ENTRY

FOR BEST FOREIGN-LANGUAGE FILM, 2008

- SOPADIN FINALIST

Grand Prix Best Screenplay, 2007

- CINEMA IN MOTION AWARDS

San Sebastian Film Festival, 2007

== Dedication ==
The film is dedicated to the memory of the Al-Dawayima massacre that happened in the village in 29 October 1948. The village ruins serve as the temporary residence of the main characters, Emad and Soraya.

== See also ==
- List of submissions to the 81st Academy Awards for Best Foreign Language Film
- List of Palestinian submissions for the Academy Award for Best Foreign Language Film
