= Annemarie Jacir =

Palestinian filmmaker and poet

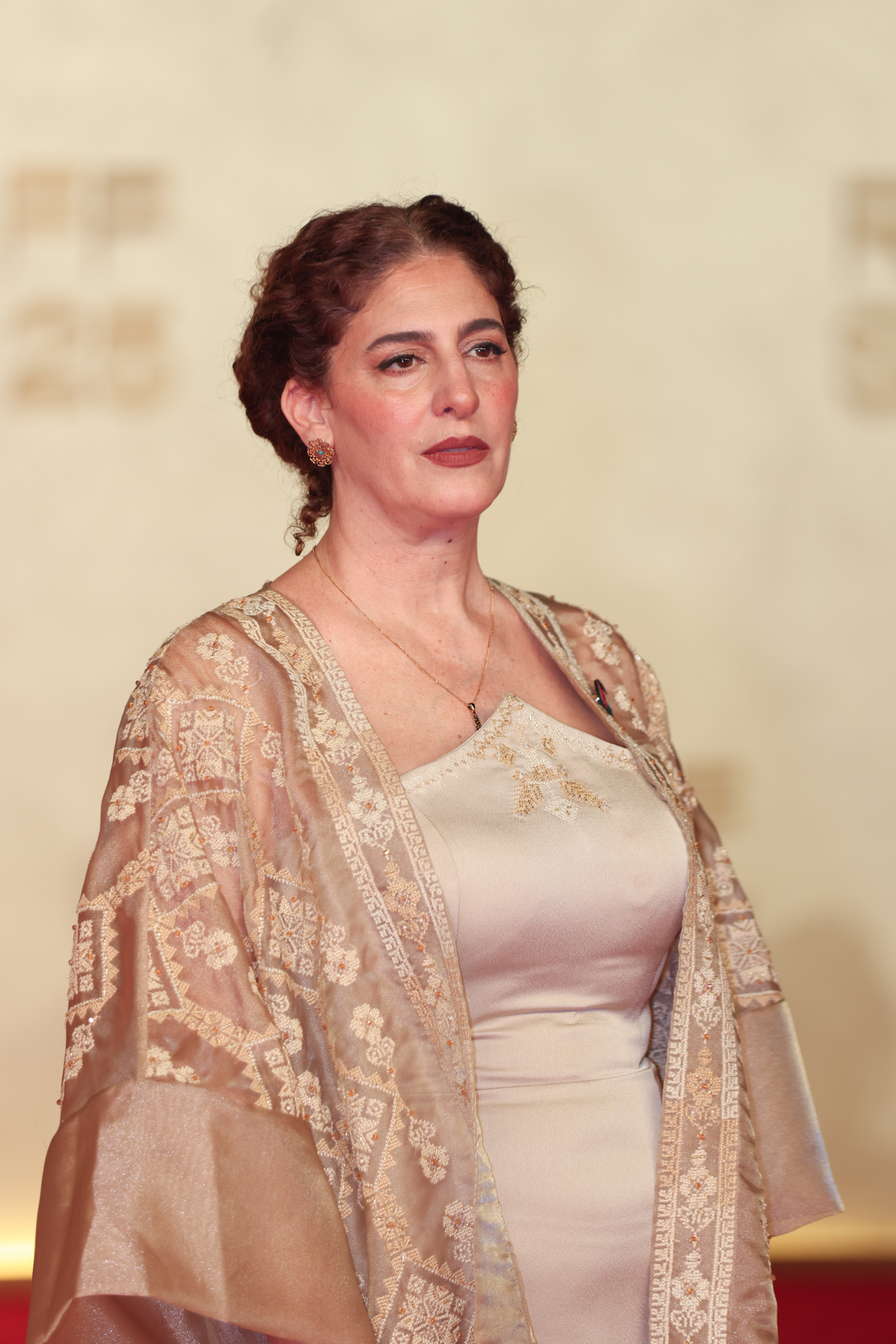
- Annemarie Jacir at the 2025 Red Sea Film Festival
- Born: 1975 (age 50–51); Bethlehem, Palestine
- Occupations: Film director, actress, screenwriter, poet
- Years active: 1998–present
- Website: www.philistinefilms.com

Annemarie Jacir (Arabic: آن ماري جاسر; born 1975 in Bethlehem, Palestine) is a Palestinian filmmaker, writer, and film producer.

== Career ==
Jacir was born to a Christian family in Bethlehem, Palestine, in 1975. She spent her childhood and youth in Saudi Arabia and later moved to the United States for her academic education. In 2002, she received her Master of Fine Arts from the Columbia University School of the Arts.

=== Filmmaking ===
Jacir has been working in independent cinema since 1998 and has written, directed and produced a number of award-winning films. Two of her films have premiered as Official Selections in Cannes, one in Berlin and in Venice, Locarno, Rotterdam, Toronto, and Telluride. All three of her feature films were selected as Palestine's Oscar Entry for Foreign Language Film. Her short film, Like Twenty Impossibles was the first Arab short film to ever be an official selection of the Cannes International Film Festival and went on to be a Student Academy Awards Finalist, winning more than 15 awards at International festivals including Best Film at the Palm Springs International Festival of Short Films, Chicago International Film Festival, Institute Du Monde Arabe Biennale, Mannheim-Heidelberg Film Festival, and IFP/New York. like twenty impossibles was named one of the ten best films of 2003 by Gavin Smith of Film Comment Magazine.

In 2007, Jacir shot the first feature film by a Palestinian woman director, Salt of this Sea, the story of a working-class American woman whose parents were Palestinian refugees, making her first visit to her family's homeland. It was shown in the Official Selection of the Cannes International Film Festival in 2008.

Salt of this Sea won the FIPRESCI Critics Award and garnered fourteen other international awards including Best Film in Milan. The film was Palestine's submission to the 81st Academy Awards for the Academy Award for Best Foreign Language Film. It also received many other awards and nominations, including winning the Muhr Arab Award for Best Screenplay at the Dubai International Film Festival, a Cinema in Motion award at the 55th San Sebastian International Film Festival and a FIPRESCI award. Salt of this Sea starred poet Suheir Hammad alongside Saleh Bakri.

Her second feature, When I Saw You, won Best Asian Film at the Berlinale, Best Arab Film in Abu Dhabi and Best Film in Amiens, Phoenix, and Olympia, and garnered a nomination at the Asian Pacific Screen Awards. Working in both fiction and documentary, other films include Until When, A Few Crumbs for the Birds, which she also shot as cinematographer, and short film A Post Oslo History.

In 2011, Chinese director Zhang Yimou selected her to be his first protégée as part of the Rolex Arts Initiative. Jacir also curates, actively promoting independent cinema in the region. Founder of Philistine Films, she collaborates as an editor, screenwriter and occasional producer with fellow filmmakers. Her 2017 film Wajib won or was nominated for 35 international awards, including Best Film in Mar Del Plata, Dubai, Locarno and Kerala, and a jury mention at the London Film Festival.

=== Poetry ===
Jacir's poetry and stories have been published in numerous literary journals and anthologies, including Mizna, the Crab Orchard Review, and The Poetry of Arab Women: A Contemporary Anthology. She has appeared in poetry readings with poet Amiri Baraka. She has won several screenwriting awards and was a finalist for the Grand Prix du Meilleur Scenariste in Paris.

== Other roles ==
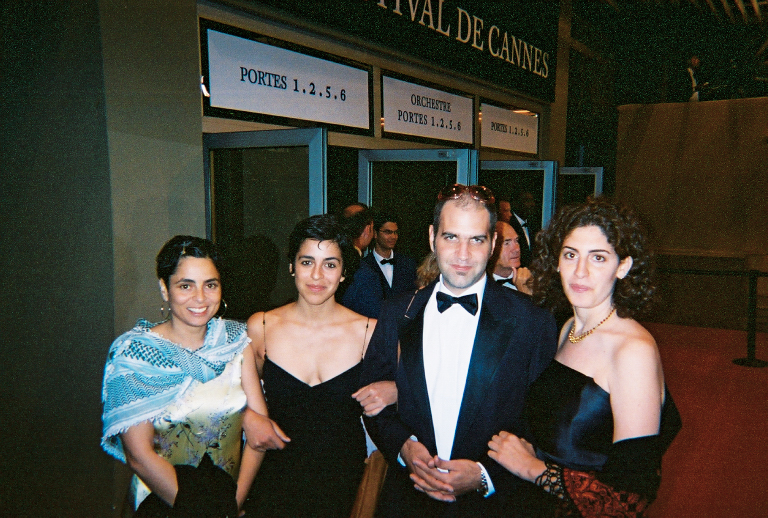
Actress Reem Abu Sbaih (far left) and composer Kamran Rastegar (second from right), with Jacir (far right) at the 2003 Cannes Film Festival for the world premiere of Like Twenty Impossibles

Jacir has served as a jury member to festivals including Cannes in 2018 (joining the Un Certain Regard jury, presided by Puerto Rican/American actor Benicio del Toro) and the Berlin International Film Festival in 2020, which was presided over by English actor Jeremy Irons.

She is a member of the Academy of Motion Picture Arts and Sciences, the British Academy of Film and Television Arts (BAFTA), and the Asian Pacific Screen Academy and a board member of Palestine Cinema Days and Alwan for the Arts, a cultural organization devoted to North African and Middle Eastern art. She is a founding member of the Palestinian Filmmakers' Collective, based in Palestine.

She has taught at Columbia University, Bethlehem University, and Birzeit University, and in refugee camps in Palestine, Lebanon, and Jordan. She is also a mentor for eQuinoxe Screenwriting Lab and Doha Film Institute. She is co-founder of the artist-run space Dar Yusuf Nasri Jacir for Art & Research in her hometown of Bethlehem.

=== Curator ===
Jacir is chief curator and founder of the "Dreams of a Nation" Palestinian cinema project, dedicated to the promotion of Palestinian cinema.

In 2003, she organized and curated Dreams of a Nation, the largest traveling film festival in Palestine, which included the screening of archival Palestinian films from Revolution Cinema. The festival took place in several Palestinian cities including Bethlehem, Ramallah, Gaza City, Nazareth, Jerusalem, and Nablus.

== Recognition and awards ==
In 2004, Jacir was named one of Filmmaker magazine's 25 New Faces of Independent Cinema. Her 2012 film When I Saw You, that featured Saleh Bakri, Ruba Blal and Mahmoud Asfa, won the NETPAC Critics Award for Best Asian Film at the 63rd Berlin International Film Festival. It was selected as the Palestinian entry for the Best Foreign Language Film at the 85th Academy Awards.

Her 2017 film Wajib starred Saleh Bakri along with his father, veteran actor Mohammad Bakri. It won them 36 international awards including Best Film at international festivals at Mar Del Plata, Dubai, Amiens, DC Film Festival, Kosovo and Kerala and a jury mention at the London BFI Festival. Saleh and Mohammad Bakri jointly won the Muhr Award for Best Actor, with Jacir winning the Muhr Award for Best Fiction Feature at the Dubai International Film Festival 2017.

== Filmography ==
- Palestine 36 (2025)
- From Palestine with Love (Postcard from the Future) (2022)
- Wajib (2017)
- When I Saw You (2012)
- Salt of This Sea (2008)
- An Explanation – And Then Burn the Ashes (2006)
- Quelques miettes pour les oiseaux (2005)
- like twenty impossibles (2003)
- The Satellite Shooters (2001)
- A Post Oslo History (2001)

== See also ==
- Dar Yusuf Nasri Jacir for Art and Research
