= The Gangster We Are All Looking For =

2003 novel by Lê Thi Diem Thúy

- Cover of the First edition
- Author: lê thi diem thúy
- Language: English
- Publisher: Knopf
- Publication date: 2003
- Publication place: United States
- Media type: Print (hardback & paperback)
- Pages: 162
- ISBN: 0-375-70002-1

The Gangster We Are All Looking For is the first novel by Vietnamese-American author lê thi diem thúy, published in 2003. It was first published as a short piece in The Best American Essays of 1997 and was also awarded a Pushcart Prize “Special Mention.”

The novel is a fragmented sequence of events recollected by a nameless narrator. In a first-person narrative, the narrator tells the stories of her past experiences as a Vietnamese immigrant. The time and place continuously shift throughout the novel; the story takes place both in Vietnam and America. The novel is concerned with themes of identity, family dynamics, war, and liberation. Images of water are prominent symbolically and literally throughout the novel.

== Narrative style ==
The novel is told through the voice of the immigrant girl when she is six, and continues building until she was 26.

The flow of the prose is anachronistic, often jumping from life in America to life in Vietnam, at times even to a time in Vietnam before the narrator's birth. The tenses also switch from present tense to past and back. The novel is also told episodically fractured, because as the author stated, "memory, by its nature, is very fragmented". She wanted “ruptures”, “disturbances”, and “pauses”, since she believed that people's memory, especially the traumatic memory are naturally fragmented.

Also, Le is good at using descriptive sentences and providing vivid details to draw images and scenes for readers. When the little girl thinks back about the swimming pool, Le emphasizes a lot of small things with a series of “I remember...” to make the paragraph rhythmic and thought-provoking (Le 54). Details like the bouncing ball and the fluttering sheets are dramatic flashbacks, which encourage readers to imagine the surroundings, in which the tragedy happens.

== Themes & Symbols ==
=== Water ===
Throughout the novel, water is the most prominent motif. From the beginning, lê thi diem thúy inserts that “In Vietnamese, the word for water and the word for a nation, a country, and a homeland are one and the same: nu’ó’c.”The reason why water is so important for Vietnamese is that Vietnam is a country that is surrounded by water. They live beside the water for generations. So it can be said that water is a holy thing for Vietnamese. In a similar sense, water plays a symbolic role in diverse ways in the text—-often, with dual/opposite meanings. Most of the themes within the text are somehow related to and entwined with the flow of water. Except for water, the palm is also an important symbol in the book to symbolize the hometown. The palm is mentioned for many times in the book because both Vietnam and California is tropical area

In fact, she always consciously and unconsciously seeks out the dead brothers to heal the trauma caused by the loss of her sibling. The representations of water are prominent symbolically and literally throughout the novel which also reflect narrator’s action after her brother’s death. Water connected Vietnam and her brother's death.

=== Repression ===
The narrator was constantly haunted by her brother' s image “As she directed the eye of the camera back to the grass, she kept crying because of what it

could not see and what she could not stop seeing.”(The Gangster 19) The repression memory on the conscious become a consistency imagination in narrator's mind. People will intend not to see the cruel fact, but it still exist. If the death is hide from others, they search is never end. "The denial and repression only increase the narrator's determination to obtain the affirmation of the brother's death. " Prior to that, she imagines that her brother is alive and is around her.

=== The Mobility of Memory through the Photograph ===
Through the photograph, The Gangster We Are All Looking For explores the nature of memory and its ability, or inability, to travel from generation to generation. In le's narrative, the photograph can be understood not only in terms of reference and time, but also “perspective of mobility".

=== The Mobility of Behaviors through walking and wandering ===
The image of water not only symbolizes their nation, Vietnam and open sea, but also shows their flexibility of their behaviors and actions, to assimilate the social activities. Chen illustrates their actions to“use physical mobility to discover their host society and to validate their existence through their bipedal adventures as active diasporic subjects” (13). Their actions to be involved in new community are as fluid as water. Her father helps her hold an advisable attitude after moving in a new land, rather than finding ways to return. More than that, their mobility on their identifications as Vietnamese Americans makes them walk and wander and find their ways to fit into the society. This quality of their identifications also causes the daughter to move around and live away from her parents.

==== “Arrival 1: Listening to the Mortified Eloquence of the Photograph” ====
From the beginning, the photograph is not presented as an object to be viewed, but as a force which disturbs the narrator's somewhat settled family. Although the photograph is not accompanied with text or a written message, to the mother, the picture is a demand, a message which tells of a time when the mother had been disowned. Because the photograph is loaded with deep emotion and grief for the mother, “she loses herself, literally her self, to it entirely” (8). But for the daughter, who does not associate much experience with the photograph, the picture does not offer any sort of access.

==== “Arrival 2: (At)Tending to the Split Photograph” ====
Treating the photograph as if it was an actual immigrant, Ma tells the narrator that the photograph has come to move in. The narrator's response is: “I don’t really know what she is talking about but I say ‘O.K.’ anyway,” suggesting the alienation and challenge of intergenerational remembering. Because the photograph is addressed towards the mother, the mother recognizes herself as the child, the grandparents as the parents. Since the mother is taking on the role of the child, she dislodges the identity of the narrator. Because the mother perceives the photograph as addressed towards herself, the photograph offers no connection to the narrator. Actually, it dislocates the narrator from her identity.

“The mother becomes a ‘child,’ the father a ‘gangster,’ and the daughter confronts the multiple voids of a vacated identity" (10). Because the daughter is incapable of interpreting or connecting to the photograph, since it was taken before she was born, her only option is to engage in a close examination which results in empty meaning. Lorensen states that the “daughter’s … relation to the family portrait from Vietnam [is] the mad dance before the entire neighborhood.” “The daughter’s mad dance could be viewed as a theatrical examination of a photograph that refuses to have meaning for her” (11). Lorensen claims that although the daughter can not see the photograph the way her mother does, she still recognizes its ability to disintegrate her family, the way her own body “dissolves” (12) as she dances in front of the entire neighborhood.

==== “Arrival 3: The Second Death of the Photographic Subject as the Catalytic Mark of Signification” ====
Lorensen also suggests that the since the photograph has come to represent the grandparents, when the family is evicted from their Linda Vista home, leaving behind the photograph, two types of “evictions” take place, the eviction from Linda Vista in America, and another one from the past, when the mother is evicted, or disowned, from her family in Vietnam. Although this may seem like an extravagant interpretation, the details of the narration suggest otherwise. There are two descriptions which link both evictions together. The description of the chain-link fence and the calling of each other's names, which are present in both "evictions". At the end, the mother calls out for her parents, which she's forgotten. This has a double meaning. She's calling for her home in Vietnam, to return to Vietnam, as well as the photographs she's forgotten at her Linda Vista home.

=== The Textual Representation of a Visual Representation (Ekphrasticism) ===
Through le's language, to the narrator and to the American reader, the photograph's meaning slides from being the grandparents to being “Vietnam.” This is due to le's language in introducing the photograph as “Vietnam is a black-and-white photograph of […]” (78) which invokes other images of black-and-white photographs regarding Vietnam that the collective American memory may recall such as the photograph of a girl running from a napalm strike or the close range shooting of a Viet Cong suspect.

Loss of Brother

The narrator loses her brother during her family immigrated from Vietnam to the U.S. In this book, sibling bereavement affects the narrator's mental condition during her childhood. Firstly, “social withdrawal and limited friendships have been found as distal correlates to sibling death in several studies” (Garlie), which can be reflected in her role as an observer bu not a participator at school and has limited friends (Le 19). In addition, she often feels differently than others or even has delusion when seeing the butterfly in the glass disk and her feelings are so delicate that she is always trying to free the butterfly in the glass disk(Le 25). What's more, she is dying for being intimate with “the boy”, which is narrated in fragments for many times. Actually, she is always looking for her dead brother, both consciously and unconsciously, the reason is because her PTSD—post traumatic stress disorder. PTSD is an “overwhelming experience of sudden or catastrophic events in which the response to the event occurs in the often uncontrolled, repetitive appearance of hallucinations and other intrusive phenomena” (3). The narrator's unconscious mind constantly reminds her of her brother, who she often fantasizes about as if he were still alive and acts with strange performances as if he were right there with her. This shows that the death of her elder brother had a very negative influence on the narrator, and it even affects her mental state gradually.

The loss of brother leads to unconscious development of defense mechanism in narrator's mind, thus prompting her to take actions to escape difficulties in later immigrant life. The narrator's unconscious defense mechanism is embodied in her selective memory of her dead brother. “Selective memory means modifying our memories so that we don 't feel overwhelmed by them or forgetting painful events entirely” (Tyson). So when the narrator thinks of her brother, she often thinks about the beautiful memories of getting along with him.As narrator illustratesinthe book: “I could lean back, I could close my eyes and fall down a flight of stairs or off the second-floor railing, and he would be there to catch me; I was certain of it” (Le 74). When she feels lonely in America, she thinks of playing games with her brother. She feels that this happy memory will enable her to solve the difficulties of loneliness. The narrator's brother protects her like a guardian angel, so she trusts him and feels warmth from him. Selectively remembering her brother is her unconscious defense mechanism to deal with her grief. She refuses to remember how her brother died and what resulted in his death because she is trying to make herself forget the painful memory.

=== The Connection of Father-and-daughter ===
The nameless girl always knows clearly she wants to be a person like her father. She aims to be "the gangster [they] are all looking for" (Le 93) and she is certain she sees her future in him (116). Her father affects her; not only is she alike to him by their biographical relations but also because of his enlightening and his accompanying. And when Le talked about the gangster formally for the first time, it is her father. Her father used to be a member of gangster and a Buddhist. Le's mother didn't know that at first and dated with him secretly. She gradually found the truth after she was married. But after the entire family moved into America, no one else knew about that fact. Though her father always acts like the gangster, violently and losing control, she wants to be this kind of person as a hero in front of her.

It is her father who adapts the new environment actively with her. It is her father who keeps company with her and builds shadow for her. As a six-year-old girl, all her knowledge is derived from her father. When she has no one to rely on except her father, the unconscious belief of becoming the kind of person who gives others safety and enlightenment implies what her father has given to her and protected her.

On the night they left Vietnam,“it was her father who carried [her] down to the beach and placed [her] on the fishing boat. During the hours that must have been ones of fear, anxiety, and desperation, [her] only memory is of how calmly [she] sat waiting for him”(105). It is her father who protects her from homelessness. He is the last straw she could hold on to. Also, the tie of father-and-daughter is crucial because father can affect the stability of children's relations with others and the sense of security, as well as some“social skills, behavior problems, motivation”and“cognitive performances”(Cabrera 122). Her father consolidates her cognition, builds her whole world and gives her sense of security.

=== Geopolitics ===
Geopolitics "refers to the involvement of geography and politics in an international framework", this term "has been used by scholars to gesture toward the entanglement of nationality and transnationality in diverse localities" (Liu). Frequently switching the places where things happened discontinuously to tell stories, as refugees or outsiders, helps to provide a fragmented and displaced context. Le makes use of the alternate scenes between Vietnam and the United States, and the alternated times between past and present in The Gangster We Are All Looking For, to piece the narrator's memory which maps the fragmentation. The storyteller, a six-year-old girl, describes how “a Catholic schoolgirl from the South” and “a Buddhist gangster from the North” meet and fall in love, and where they give birth to her in Vietnam in the third chapter of this book (Le 79). She relates the metaphor as told by her mother to reflect that the war pains this family a lot, and it is like a bird that they can't get rid of, flies with this family all the time and never stops hurting from Vietnam to the United States (Le 87). Later in this chapter, she makes a turn that focuses on the life they have in the yellow house in California while her family has to move out again like they had to leave Vietnam as refugees (Le 88).

=== Palm ===
Palm most commonly refers to:

- Palm of the hand, the central region of the front of the hand
- Palm trees, of family Arecaceae

As one of the softest part of human body, the narrator uses it to seek and observe things. Through touching and feeling things by her palm, what she feels are more factual and sensitive. When she is going to bring the ice bag to her mom, the melting ice bag reminds her of her died brother. Since “the fingertips [are] wrinkled with cold, as if [she]’d been swimming for hours” (Le 77), her palm is stimulated because of the physical response. This depiction that symbolizes the frozen memory of her brother also begins to emerge.

What is more, "palm" is also a kind of tree that pervades in the whole story. It seems that this tree records everything happened on this immigrant family as a documentary.

The existence of palm in the United States is as symbolic as the meaning of water to Vietnam. Palm is very common in the United States, just like seeing water in the author's consciousness can think of hometown Vietnam. "When they cut away the plastic, what we saw was a squat baby palm tree"(Le 53). In this section, the landlord took the water out of the pool and planted a palm to represent the replacement. The water, the swimming pool, the only one connection with the narrator's hometown she believed has disappeared, and replaced by a baby palm. This shows that she was also forced to integrate into the new environment.

=== Conspiracy Silence ===
There is a “communicative disruption” (Ha 4) between her and her father, “water moving through a reed pipe in the middle of a sad tune. And the voice is always asking and answering itself” (Le 10). Her father never shares his past or what he has experienced with his family members. He always chooses to be silent or cry alone. In this case, “Ba” is trapped in his unsolved traumatic memories, which obstructs him keep going. According to Ha's analysis, Ba “fears being overwhelmed by his past, but his inability to transcend that past holds it as an ever-present obsession” (Ha 5), which reveals “Ba” still in the conflicts between past pain and present suffering. His emotion shows his lost in self-identity. It is obvious that “Ba” doesn't know how to get over the original trauma to adapt to a new cultural life.

== Reception ==
Le's novel received wide acclaim through a multitude of book reviews ranging from Entertainment Weekly to The New York Times to Publishers Weekly. There have been some minor reserves, though, about the pace of the book and the difficulty of reading a fragmented narrative.

Entertainment Weekly: "Lovely and sparse, Gangster is like an impressionist painting-pretty strokes of prose melding to create a larger whole."

Library Journal: "The story opens slowly but gathers strength, and though it remains somewhat muted, le's lyrical writing and skill with the telling vignette will reward patient readers."

The New York Times: "Readers will not always find 'The Gangster We Are All Looking For' easy to follow or the narrator's viewpoint consistent, but the cumulative, almost liturgical effects of the novel is both heartbreaking and exhilarating."

Publishers Weekly: "This is a stark and significant work that will challenge readers."
