= Dar Yusuf Nasri Jacir for Art and Research =

Palestinian arts and culture center

The Dar Yusuf Nasri Jacir for Art and Research (Arabic: دار يوسف نصري جاسر للفنون والبحوث, romanized: Dār Yūsuf Naṣrī Jāsir lil-Funūn wa-al-Buḥūth) is a multi-faceted artist-run space for artistic, educational, cultural and agricultural exchanges and research located in Bethlehem. It was founded in 2014 by Emily Jacir; Annemarie Jacir and Yusuf Nasri Jacir are co-founders. The space is located in their 19th century family home in Bethlehem. Originally built in the late 1880's by al Mukhtar Yusuf Jacir. Emily Jacir and Aline Khoury co-direct the space.

== Location ==
The Centre lies in Area A of the Israeli occupied West Bank, on the outskirts of Bethlehem, at the entrance of El Khalil Road, a major transit point between Hebron and Jerusalem. The Separation Wall and the site of Rachel's Tomb it encircles lies nearby, at a distance of some 600 feet.

== Activities ==
The centre is an important hub for artists writers, musicians and researchers visiting the West Bank. Since its foundation it has hosted a number of international artists, including the Cuban-American artist, Coco Fusco, the British-Palestinian novelist Isabella Hammad, Michael Rakowitz, the American-Chilean composer, Nicolas Jaar, and also Trevor Paglen and Sam Durant, in its residency program, which started in 2018.

== Raid ==
During the 2021 Israel–Palestine crisis, the treed field adjacent to the centre was burnt to the ground and some days later, according to its owners, the centre itself was raided by Israeli forces. notable damage had been caused by an intrusion and, according to the owners, phones, computers, hard drives, cameras and books were confiscated. The report has not been yet independently confirmed.

== Fundraising ==
After the raid, an online fundraising campaign to finance reconstruction and replace damaged or lost infrastructure managed to raise $25,000 within two days. By June that figure reached $30,000. The goal is to raise $50,000, to restore the Urban Farm on the property and secure the future of the Centre's activities.

== Sources ==
- Bishara, Hakim (19 May 2021a). "Artist Emily Jacir's Bethlehem Arts Center Ransacked By Israeli Army". Hyperallergic com.
- Bishara, Hakim (14 June 2021b). "Supporters Raise Over $30K for Bethlehem Arts Center Raided by Israeli Soldiers". Hyperallergic com.
- Ditmars, Hadani (19 May 2021). "Artist-run Dar Jacir Center in Bethlehem damaged". The Art Newspaper.
- Forensic Architecture (20 August 2021). "Our art deals with real injustices, some in Palestine: no wonder we faced opposition". The Guardian.
- Greenberger, Alex (18 May 2021). "Israeli Forces Reportedly Damage Artist Emily Jacir's West Bank Art Center". ARTnews.
- "Isabella Hammad". Dar Jacir homepage. 2021.
- Neuendorf, Henri (23 May 2017). "Palestinian Artist Emily Jacir Plans to Transform Her Family Home Into a West Bank Art Center". Artnet.
- "West Bank Arts Center Dar Jacir Ransacked". Artforum. 18 May 2021.
