= Children of Marx and Coca-Cola =

2009 book by Xiaoping Lin

First edition

Children of Marx and Coca-Cola : Chinese Avant-garde Art and Independent Cinema is a 2009 non-fiction book by Xiaoping Lin, published by the University of Hawaii Press.

It in includes discussions of transnational artists between China and the United States and the reform and opening up period in China.

It is a part of "Critical Interventions," with Sheldon Hsiao-peng Lu as the editor, and is the collection's second book.

The title refers to the phrase "the children of Marx and Coca-Cola" stated in Masculin Féminin, by Jean-Luc Godard.

== Contents ==
There are nine chapters organized into three parts. Prior to the chapters there is an introduction, "Reading Chinese Avant-Garde Art and Independent Cinema in Context." It includes a discussion of Andy Warhol's travel to China, which occurred in 1982.

The three parts are, in order: "Re-creating Urban Space in Avant-garde Art," "China’s Lost Youth through the Lens of Independent Cinema," and "In Quest of Meaning in a Spiritual Void: Film and Video."

The following chapters are in part one: Hong Hao's photography of buildings is covered in chapter one, "Discourse and Displacement: Contemplating Beijing’s Urban Landscape." Yin Xiuzhen's artwork depicting the changes in Beijing and its damaging of historical memory is chronicled in "Beijing: Yin Xiuzhen's The Ruined City," the second chapter. U.S.-based Chinese artists are chronicled in "Globalism or Nationalism? Cai Guo-Qiang, Zhang Huan, and Xu Bing in New York," the third chapter.

The following chapters are in part two: "New Chinese Cinema of the ‘Sixth Generation’: A Distant Cry of Forsaken Children," the fourth chapter, discusses the following films: Beijing Bastards, Beijing Bicycle, Lunar Eclipse, Rainclouds over Wushan, and Suzhou River. The Orphan of Anyang is discussed in "Behind Chinese Walls: The Uncanny Power of Matriarchy in Wang Chao's Anyang Orphan,” the fifth chapter. Films are discussed in "The Imagery of Postsocialist Trauma in Peacock, Shanghai Dreams, and Stolen Life," the sixth chapter.

The following chapters are in part three: "Jia Zhangke's Cinematic Trilogy: A Journey across the Ruins of Post-Mao China," the seventh chapter, chronicles Platform, Xiao Shan Going Home, and Xiao Wu. "The Video Works of Yang Fudong: An Ultimate Escape from a Global Nightmare" is the eighth chapter. "Ning Hao's Incense: A Curious Tale of Earthly Buddhism" is chapter nine.

There is also a postscript titled "Chinese Artists and Filmmakers at the Beginning of a New Century."

Three of the chapters were first published in this book, while the others were either previously published in other books, or were journal articles, or both.

The book includes photographs are of films and of artwork; they number 30 altogether and are presented in monochrome black and white.

== Reception ==
Rossella Ferrari of the School of Oriental and African Studies wrote that the book is "an important addition to the field of contemporary Chinese studies" and " a pertinent and pleasurable read".

Ting Wang, an independent scholar, stated that "the book acquires its significance in helping non-Chinese researchers and students to gain a much-needed better understanding" of the topic; Wang criticized how he "overshadows or distracts from the originality of his own argument" by unnecessarily citing other portions of works and adding "meticulous research" which "are sometimes only tangentially related to the topic at hand". Wang also felt that some of the comparisons to American classic films is "implicitly diluting the originality of the Chinese films under study" as the films may be unknown by these Chinese movie creators and are not often accessible within China.
