= Dream and Silence =

2012 film

- Film poster
- Directed by: Jaime Rosales
- Written by: Jaime Rosales
- Produced by: Jaime Rosales
- Starring: Yolanda Galocha
- Cinematography: Óscar Durán
- Release date: 23 May 2012 (Cannes)
- Running time: 120 minutes
- Country: Spain
- Language: Spanish

Dream and Silence (Spanish: Sueño y silencio) is a 2012 Spanish drama film directed by Jaime Rosales. The film was screened in the Directors' Fortnight section at the 2012 Cannes Film Festival.

== Cast ==
- Yolanda Galocha as Yolanda
- Oriol Rosselló as Oriol
