= Alice Tuan =

American writer

Alice Tuan is an Asian American playwright, teacher and performer.

== Education ==
Tuan earned a bachelor's degree in economics from UCLA. In 1997, she earned a MFA in creative writing from Brown University.

== Awards ==
In the year 2000, Los Angeles’ Mark Taper Forum honored her with the Richard E. Sherwood Award in June, while New York's Downtown Arts Project awarded her the Colbert Award for Excellence that fall. She was also given a New Voices Playwriting Award from East West Players.

Two years prior, Tuan was endowed with the NEA/TCG Residency Program for Playwrights through Los Angeles’ East West Players (1998–2000) while also given a Playwright in Residence grant at the Los Angeles Theatre Center (1998–1999).

Upon graduating from Brown University with an MFA in creative writing in 1997, Tuan was the winner of the Perishable Theater 5th Annual Woman's Playwriting Festival. She was also awarded the Drama-Logue Award for Best Play that year for scribing Ikebana.

== Plays ==
The best known of these plays, Ajax (por nobody), had a year run at New York's Flea Theater and traveled to the Melbourne Fringe Festival in September 2001.

Last of the Suns, her first play, tells of a Chinese Nationalist army general shriveling away under the harsh California sun as his failed and defecting ice-skating granddaughter comes to visit him on his 100th birthday. It premiered at Berkeley Repertory Theatre and was later produced by New York's Ma-Yi Theater Company.

More recent works include the Virtual Hypertext Play Coastline, which traveled to the Edinburgh Fringe Festival in August 2005, and BATCH: An American Bachelor/ette Party Spectacle,' directed by Whit MacLaughlin and in collaboration with New Paradise Laboratories.

== Teaching ==
Tuan has facilitated playwright workshops at all levels throughout the United States. She taught English as a Second Language (ESL) in China and Los Angeles.
