= A Thousand Months =

2003 film

- French poster
- French: Mille mois
- Directed by: Faouzi Bensaïdi
- Written by: Faouzi Bensaïdi; Emmanuelle Sardou
- Produced by: Bénédicte Bellocq; Mustapha El Orch
- Starring: Fouad Labied
- Cinematography: Antoine Héberlé
- Edited by: Sandrine Deegen
- Release date: 16 May 2003
- Running time: 124 minutes
- Countries: France; Morocco
- Language: French

A Thousand Months (French: Mille mois) is a 2003 French-Moroccan drama film directed by Faouzi Bensaïdi. It was screened in the Un Certain Regard section at the 2003 Cannes Film Festival.

== Cast ==
- Fouad Labied as Mehdi
- Nezha Rahile as Amina
- Mohamed Majd as Grandfather
- Mohammed Afifi as Houcine
- Abdelati Lambarki as Caid
- Mohamed Bastaoui as Caid's Brother
- Brahim Khai as The moqadam
- Abdellah Chicha as Abdelhadi
- Mohamed Choubi as Marzouk, primary school teacher
- Hajar Masdouki as Saadia
- Meryem Massaia as Malika
- Nabila Baraka as Lalla hnia
- Mohammed Talibi as The Kaid
- Faouzi Bensaïdi as Samir
- Rachid Bencheikh as The shepherd
