= When I Saw You (film) =

2012 film

- Film poster
- Directed by: Annemarie Jacir
- Written by: Annemarie Jacir
- Produced by: Ossama Bawardi
- Starring: Mahmoud Asfa
- Cinematography: Hélène Louvart
- Music by: Kamran Rastegar
- Distributed by: The Match Factory
- Release date: 9 September 2012 (Toronto)
- Running time: 93 minutes
- Countries: Palestine; Jordan
- Language: Arabic

When I Saw You (Arabic: لما شفتك, translit. Lamma Shoftak) is a 2012 Palestinian drama film directed by Annemarie Jacir. The film was selected as the Palestinian entry for the Best Foreign Language Oscar at the 85th Academy Awards. It won Best Asian Film at the 63rd Berlin International Film Festival (NETPAC Award).

== Premise ==
1967. In Jordan, a different kind of change is underway as tens of thousands of refugees pour across the border from Palestine. Having been separated from his father in the chaos of war, Tarek, 11, and his mother Ghaydaa, are amongst this latest wave of refugees. Placed in "temporary" refugee camps made up of tents and prefab houses until they would be able to return, they wait, like the generation before them who arrived in 1948. With difficulties adjusting to life in Harir camp and a longing to be reunited with his father, Tarek searches for a way out, and discovers a new hope emerging with the times. Eventually his free spirit and curious nature lead him to a group of people on a journey that will change their lives.

== Cast ==
- Mahmoud Asfa as Tarek
- Ruba Blal as Ghaydaa
- Saleh Bakri as Layth
- Anas Algaralleh as Mr. Nasser
- Ali Elayan as Abu Akram
- Ruba Shamshoum as Zain
- Ahmad Srour as Touissant
- Firas W. Taybeh as Majed

== Accolades ==
Year	Award	Category	Recipient	Result	Ref.
2013	Asia Pacific Screen Awards	Best Children's Feature Film		Nominated	
2013	Young Artist Award	Best Performance in an International Feature Film – Young Actor	Mahmoud Asfa	Nominated	
2013	Best Asian Film	Berlin International Film Festival – NETPAC Award		Won	

== See also ==
- List of submissions to the 85th Academy Awards for Best Foreign Language Film
- List of Palestinian submissions for the Academy Award for Best Foreign Language Film
