= Alejandro Chomski =

Argentine film director (1968–2022)

- Born: 27 November 1968; Buenos Aires, Argentina
- Died: 5 November 2022 (aged 53)
- Occupations: Film director; screenwriter
- Years active: 1997 — 2022

Alejandro Chomski (27 November 1968 – 5 November 2022) was an Argentine film director and screenwriter. He helmed 16 films counting both short and full-length features. His film Hoy y mañana was screened in the Un Certain Regard section at the 2003 Cannes Film Festival.

Chomski died in his sleep on November 5, 2022, at the age of 53.

== Filmography ==
- Alexander and the Terrible, Horrible, No Good, Very Bad Day (1997)
- Dry Martini (1998)
- Hoy y mañana (2003)
- Feel the Noise (2007)
- A Beautiful Life (2008)
- Asleep in the Sun (2010)
- In the Country of the Last Things (2011)
