= Maria João Ganga =

Angolan film director and screenwriter

- Born: 1964 (age 61–62); Huambo, Angola
- Education: Ecole Superieure Libre d'Etudes Cinématographiques, (ESEC) Paris
- Occupations: Director; screenwriter
- Notable work: Hollow City, Rostov-Luanda

Maria João Ganga is an Angolan film director and screenwriter, best known for being the first woman to make a full-length feature film in Angola. Her film Hollow City (Na Cidade Vazia), which she wrote and directed was released in 2004. The film won the Special Jury Prize at the 2004 Paris Film Festival.

== Biography ==
Ganga attended the Ecole Superieure Libre d'Etudes Cinématographiques, (ESEC) film school in Paris.

Ganga wrote the screenplay for Hollow City, based on a novel by Artur Carlos Maurício Pestana dos Santos (Pepetela). The film is set in 1991 during the Angolan civil war. This is a story about lives disrupted by the war.

The story centers around an eleven year old boy, N'dala (Roldan Pinto João), who witnesses the massacre of his family by soldiers in his native village of Bie. N'dala and other orphaned children are rescued and taken to Luanda, Angola's capital by a missionary nun. N'dala runs away and wanders into the center of the enormous city where he faces many challenges.

Ganga worked as assistant director on the documentary Rostov-Luanda by Abderrahmane Sissako. She has also written and directed for theatre.

== Filmography ==
Year	Film	Role	Notes
2004	Hollow City (Na Cidade Vazia)	Director	Angolan Civil War drama
1997	Rostov-Luanda	Assistant director	Documentary set in Angola
