= WWW - What a Wonderful World =

- Directed by: Faouzi Bensaïdi
- Starring: Faouzi Bensaïdi; Nezha Rahile
- Release date: 3 September 2006 (VFF)
- Running time: 1h 39min
- Countries: France, Morocco, Germany
- Languages: French, Arabic

WWW - What a Wonderful World is a 2006 Moroccan comedy film directed by Faouzi Bensaïdi.

== Cast ==
- Faouzi Bensaïdi - Kamel
- Nezha Rahile - Kenza
- Fatima Attif - Souad
- Hajar Masdouki - Fatima
- El Mehdi Elaaroubi - Hicham

== Reception ==
The film has been presented as an "entirely modern movie, burlesque in its acting, strange in its composition of pictures, funny and bold". It received a positive review in Le Monde. Africultures too praised the originality of the director's choices. The film has been called a postmodern revisitation of noir.
