= Alwan for the Arts =

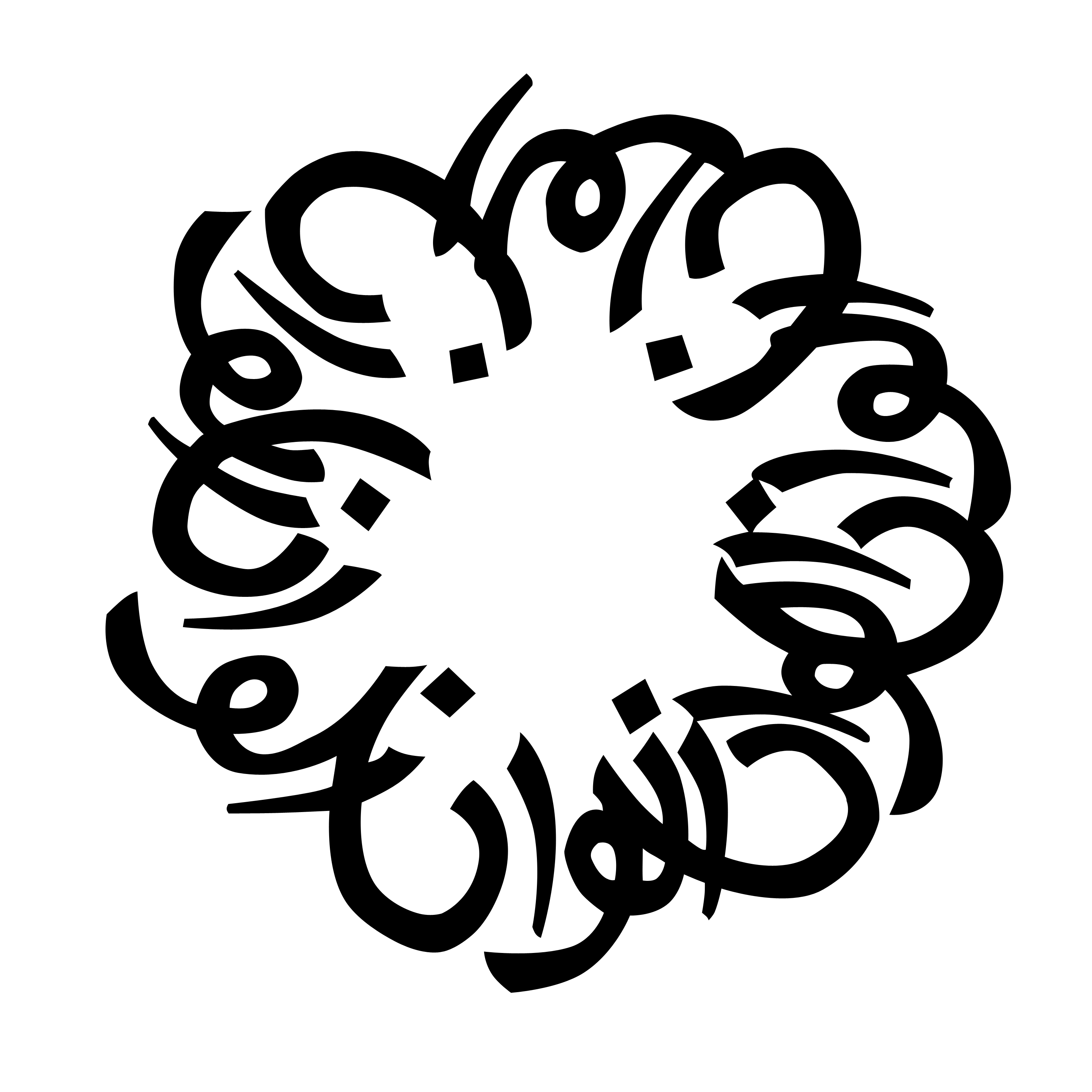
- Founded: 1998
- Type: Non-profit
- Purpose: Middle Eastern Arts
- Location(s): 16 Beaver St. 4th floor, New York City, United States
- Region served: New York City
- Website: alwanforthearts.org

Alwan for the Arts (Arabic: مركز ألوان للفنون) is a 501c3 nonprofit Arts & Culture organization that promotes understanding and fostering appreciation of the diverse cultural experiences and representations of the Arab world and of South Asia. The organization strives to provide a platform for showcasing the artistic expressions and intellectual contributions of these regions and their diasporas. Alwan for the Arts allow New Yorkers, both Middle Eastern and non-Middle Eastern, to enjoy the arts from that region of the world.

== History ==
Since 1998, Alwan has facilitated direct interaction between the general public and artists and scholars from the Middle East, North Africa, and South Asia, thereby enriching cross-cultural encounters and dialogue. In 2003, this endeavor was institutionalized by the acquisition of 501(c)3, nonprofit status, and moving into Alwan's current home, a loft-like space that lends itself to dance and music events as well as lectures.

In the spring of 1998, two friends realized that the dispersed Middle Eastern and South Asian communities needed a place to connect creatively and intellectually with others of similar backgrounds, outside the confines of academia. This dialogue segued into the creation of Alwan. Originally, the organization facilitated exploration of the founder's passions for Arab cinema. The germination of Alwan started through the launch of a series of provocative film screenings in academic settings. These screenings eventually soon consolidated and expanded into a small film festival. In due course, this festival became Alwan's annual New York Arab & South Asian Film Festival (NYASAFF), the largest such event outside of the Middle East.

Alwan's programming quickly expanded beyond film to other cultural spheres, including lectures, book talks, music and dance performances, workshops, language, music, and dance classes.

Alwan hosts several events per month, often several per week, covering various aspects of Middle Eastern art and academia. Its events have featured distinguished speakers such as Hamid Dabashi and Norman Finkelstein. Alwan has also served the Middle Eastern community as a meeting point for the organizers of new nonprofit groups such as Existence is Resistance, "an internationalist organization determined to promote non-violent resistance through cultural arts".

== Headquarters/Location ==
Alwan for the Arts is based in Lower Manhattan at 16 Beaver Street, 4th Floor, New York, NY 10004. Alwan frequently hosts events in its space which can be adapted for different types of programming from an open floor to row seating with a capacity of around 100 people.

== Cultural programming and events ==
Alwan offers a variety of events and cultural programs that all revolve around the Arts linked to the Middle East. Past events have ranged from debka workshop classes to political panel discussions with world-renowned professors, as well as music concerts and book signings.

=== Film Festival ===
Alwan hosts an annual film festival, the New York Arab & South Asian Film Festival (NYASAFF), which shows the best in recent features and documentaries from the region

=== Classes ===
Alwan offers beginner and intermediate Arabic language classes as well as Middle Eastern dance and music workshops.
