= Today and Tomorrow (2003 film) =

2003 film

- Directed by: Alejandro Chomski
- Written by: Alejandro Chomski
- Produced by: Alejandro Chomski
- Starring: Antonella Costa
- Cinematography: Guillermo Nieto
- Edited by: Nicolas Goldbart; Alex Zito
- Release date: 22 May 2003
- Running time: 87 minutes
- Country: Argentina
- Language: Spanish

Today and Tomorrow (Spanish: Hoy y mañana) is a 2003 Argentine drama film directed by Alejandro Chomski. It was screened in the Un Certain Regard section at the 2003 Cannes Film Festival.

== Cast ==
- Antonella Costa as Paula
- Carlos Lipsic
- Romina Ricci
- Horacio Acosta
- Ricardo Merkin
- Francisco Nápoli
- Sebastian Rotstein as Barman
- Sergio Álvarez
- Carlos Durañona
- Víctor Hugo Carrizo
- Leonora Balcarce
- Violeta Naón
- Manuel Navarro
- Marina Tamar
- Fabian Mell
