= Hollow City (film) =

- Still
- Directed by: Maria João Ganga
- Written by: Maria João Ganga
- Produced by: François Gonot
- Starring: João Roldan; Domingos Fernandes Fonseca
- Cinematography: Jacques Besse
- Edited by: Pascale Chavance
- Music by: Manu Dibango & Né Gonçalves
- Distributed by: The Global Film Initiative
- Release date: 2004
- Running time: 88 minutes
- Country: Angola
- Language: Portuguese

Hollow City (Na Cidade Vazia) (2004) is the first full-length movie directed by Angolan-born director Maria João Ganga. The film is one of the first to be produced in Angola since the end of the civil war, and the first film produced by an Angolan woman. Filming was done on location in Luanda, Angola. International versions of the film are in the Portuguese language with English subtitles.

== Plot ==
The film centers around the life of an orphan named N'dala, who is taken to the city of Luanda after the death of his parents during the Angolan civil war. Wanting to return to his hometown of Bié, N'dala flees from the nuns who have saved him into the streets of the city. He wanders from place to place meeting various figures, such as a young man named Zé who tries to help him find a home. Later in the film N'dala is taken under the wing of a criminal named Joka who exploits him for his own uses.

== See also ==
- Global Film Initiative
