= Like Twenty Impossibles =

- كأننا عشرون مستحيل
- Directed by: Annemarie Jacir
- Written by: Annemarie Jacir; Kamran Rastegar
- Starring: Tarek Abu Assab; Ashraf Abu Moch; Reem Abu-Sbaih
- Cinematography: Philippe Bellaiche
- Music by: Kamran Rastegar
- Release date: 2003
- Running time: 17 minutes
- Country: Palestine

Like Twenty Impossibles (Arabic: كأننا عشرون مستحيل; Ka'inana Ashrun Mustaheel) is an independent short film written and directed by Annemarie Jacir in 2003.

Like Twenty Impossibles was Jacir's graduate thesis film while she was attending Columbia University. It is a fiction film shot in occupied Palestine during the Second Intifada about a Palestinian film crew attempting to cross Israeli checkpoints.

It received attention when it became the first ever short film from the Arab world to be chosen as an Official Selection of the Cannes International Film Festival. As well as being the first Palestinian short film in Cannes, it also marked the first time a Palestinian female director walked the red carpet. The film went on to win numerous awards and was a National Finalist at the Academy Awards, breaking new ground for Arab cinema.

Annemarie Jacir is considered part of the Arab New Wave Cinema.

== Awards ==
Like Twenty Impossibles was the first Palestinian short film to be an official selection at the Cannes Film Festival. It was a National Finalist of Academy Awards and won over 15 awards including Best Film at Chicago International Film Festival, IFP/New York, Institut du Monde Arabe, and Palm Springs International Film Festival.

- World Premiere, Cannes Film Festival, Official Selection, Cinefondation, 2003
- Best Films of the Year list - Film Comment Magazine
- National Finalist - Academy of Motion Picture Arts, Student Academy Awards
- Best Short Screenplay - Nantucket Film Festival, 2003
- Best Short Film - Palm Springs International Short Film Festival
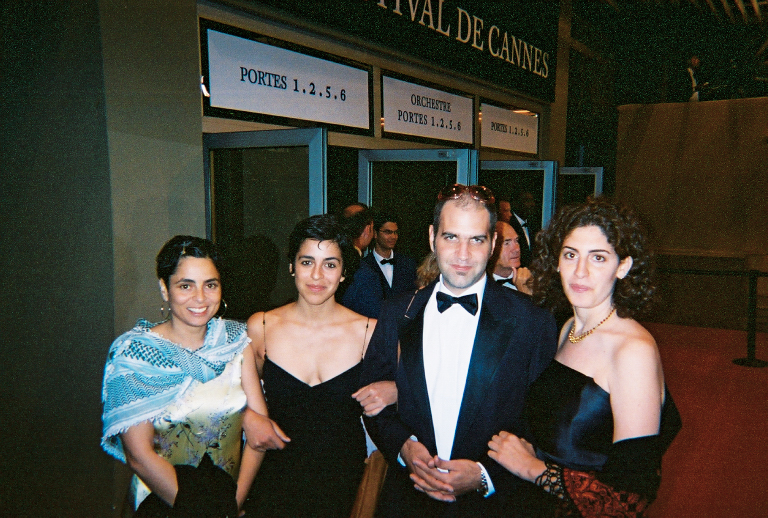
  Palestinian actress Reem Abu Sbaih, Composer Kamran Rastegar, and Writer-Director Annemarie Jacir at Cannes International Film Festival 2003 for World Premiere of like twenty impossibles
- Best Short Film (Emerging Narrative) - IFP/New York
- Silver Plaque - Chicago International Film Festival
- Best Short Film - Institute Du Monde Arabe Biannual
- Best Screenwriting – Lenola Film Festival, Italy
- Best Short Film Second Prize – Lenola Film Festival, Italy
- Audience Choice Award - Polo Ralph Lauren Columbia University Festival
- Special Jury Prize - Ramallah International Film Festival
- Audience Choice Award – San Diego Women Film Festival 2006
- Luis Trenker Award for Best Short Film – 4Film Festival, Borderlands, 2006
- National Qualifier - Academy of Motion Picture Arts, Academy Awards
- Locarno Film Festival, Official Selection
- Edinburgh International Film Festival, Official Selection
- Telluride Film Festival, Official Selection
- New York Film Festival, Official Selection
