= Ana 'Rokafella' Garcia =

American breakdancer

Ana Garcia (born 1971), better known by her stage name Rokafella, is a breakdancer, dance teacher, poet, musician, and entrepreneur. She has been credited as being a femme break dance pioneer and influencing the new generation of B-Girls and B-Boys.

== Early life ==
Garcia was raised in Spanish Harlem by Puerto Rican migrants and showed an early interest in breakdancing, as she saw hip hop performed in her own neighborhood. She states that the cultural norms of her ethnic background contributed to this mindset, stating “being of Latino background there was a difference between what the males could get away with and what the females had to do". She has listed her early inspirations as including Iris Chacón, KRS-One, Rita Moreno, Lauryn Hill, and Celia Cruz and used them to help develop her style.

== Career ==
In 1991, veteran breakdancer and later husband Kwikstep took Garcia on as a mentee. She would go on to dance with many crews in New York City that included The Transformers, The Breeze Team, and the New York City Float Committee, where she would eventually earn the nickname 'Rokafella'. Garcia has stated that one of the moments in her career that stood out to her was when she received applause from an audience that had gathered to watch her and others perform, which she said was rare because "up until that point since I had minimal eye-catching moves compared to the guys who were street performing." She has also commented that the hip hop scene is traditionally male dominated and that she and other women have received negativity from men who "find it hard to accept a woman's participation in a physically demanding genre", but that if women "stay in the game long enough the skills and the respect always come together."

Together with Kwikstep, Garcia co-founded the non-profit hip-hop dance company Full Circle Productions, which aims to empower young dancers through the positive impact of hip-hop. She has performed for Full Circle and also serves as a teacher. She has also served as a judge for The International Battle of the Year.
