= Jaime Rosales (director) =

Spanish film director

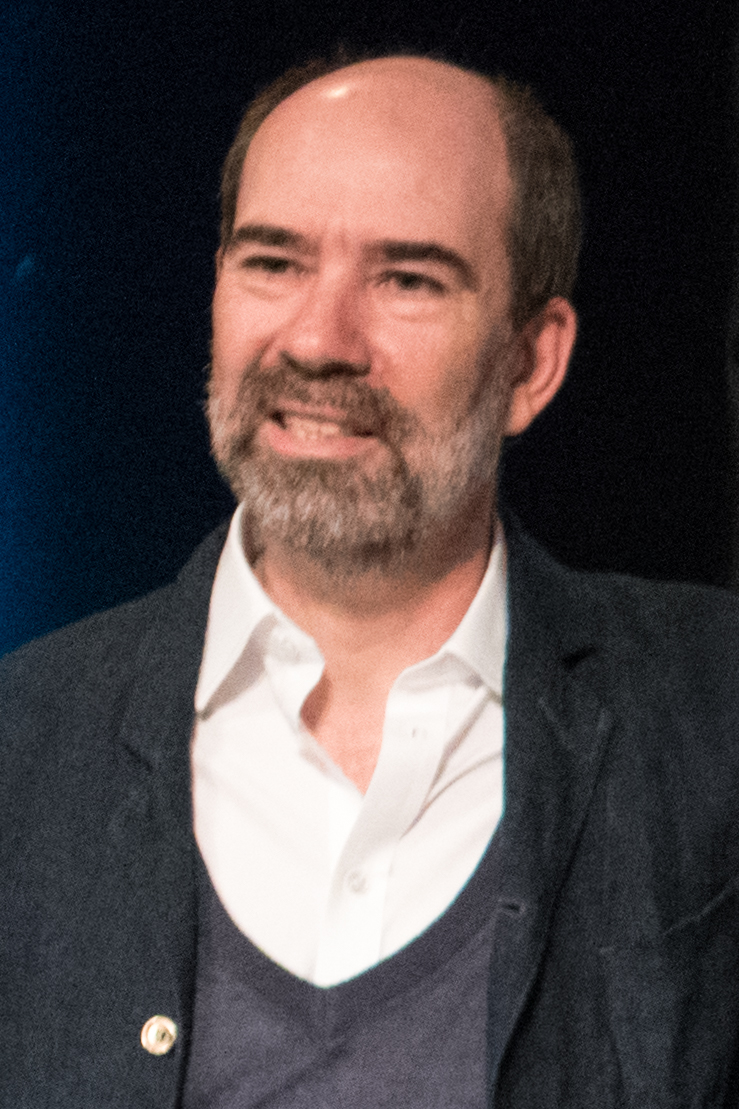
- Rosales in 2019
- Born: 1970 (age 55–56); Barcelona, Spain
- Occupation: Film director
- Years active: 1998–present

Jaime Rosales (born 1970 in Barcelona) is a Spanish film director, screenwriter and film producer.

He spent three years in Cuba studying cinema at the Escuela Internacional de Cine y Televisión in San Antonio de los Baños (EICTV) in La Habana, and later at Australian Film Television and Radio School (AFTRS) in Sydney (Australia).

He did several successful short films before his long film debut with Las horas del día that received the FIPRESCI Award at Cannes film festival. In 2007 filmed his second film, La soledad.

His cinema is influenced by Robert Bresson or Yasujirō Ozu, he shows fragments of lives with ascetic forms and still shots. He won the Goya Award for Best Director for La soledad, film that received the Goya for Best Film too.

His 2012 film Dream and Silence was screened in the Directors' Fortnight section at the 2012 Cannes Film Festival, and also appeared at the 56th London Film Festival. His 2014 film Beautiful Youth was selected to compete in the Un Certain Regard section at the 2014 Cannes Film Festival.

== Filmography ==
Director and screenwriter:

- 2003: The Hours of the Day (originally Las horas del día)
- 2007: Solitary Fragments (originally La soledad)
- 2008: Bullet in the Head (originally Tiro en la cabeza)
- 2012: Dream and Silence
- 2014: Beautiful Youth
- 2018: Petra
- 2022: Wild Flowers
- 2025: Morlaix

Producer:

- 2003: Las horas del día (Dir: Jaime Rosales)
- 2003: Un instante en la vida ajena (Dir: José Luis López-Linares)
- 2006: La linea recta (Dir: José María de Orbe)
- 2007: La soledad (Dir: Jaime Rosales)
- 2008: Tiro en la cabeza
- 2009: El árbol (Dir: Carlos Serrano Azcona)
