= Death for Sale =

- Directed by: Faouzi Bensaïdi
- Screenplay by: Faouzi Bensaïdi
- Produced by: Entre Chien et Loup, Agora Film, Liaison Cinématographique
- Starring: Fehd Benchemsi, Fouad Labiad, Mouchcine Malzi, Iman Mechrafi, Nezha Rahil, Faouzi Bensaïdi
- Edited by: Danielle Anezin
- Music by: Richard Horowitz
- Distributed by: Urban Distribution
- Release date: 2011
- Running time: 117 minutes
- Countries: Morocco; Belgium; France
- Language: Arab

Death for Sale is a 2011 film directed by Faouzi Bensaïdi. The film was selected as the Moroccan entry for the Best Foreign Language Oscar at the 85th Academy Awards, but it did not make the final shortlist.

== Plot ==
Drifting youngsters under the leaden sky of Tetouan, a city in northern Morocco. Malik, Allal and Soufiane, are desperate petty criminals, who try to flee a life of material and moral poverty. None of them finds a way out: Malik is in love with the prostitute Dounia and to help her accepts working with a corrupt police inspector, Allal pushes drugs and has the police hot on his heels, Soufiane gives vent to his rage by embracing the cause of fundamentalism. The three friends decide to attempt a job in a jeweller's for a last chance.

== Awards ==
- Berlin International Film Festival 2012
- Brussels Film Festival 2012
- Moroccan National Film Festival 2012

== See also ==
- List of submissions to the 85th Academy Awards for Best Foreign Language Film
- List of Moroccan submissions for the Academy Award for Best Foreign Language Film
