= Nadia Kounda =

Moroccan film actress (born 1989)

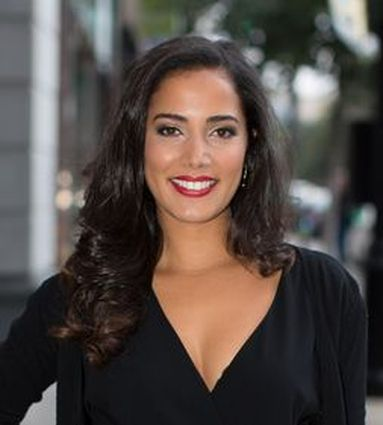
- Born: Nadia Kounda; 24 October 1989 (age 36); Casablanca, Morocco
- Occupation: Actress
- Years active: 2008–present

Nadia Kounda (born 24 October 1989) is a Moroccan film actor.

== Career ==
Nadia Kounda was born in Casablanca, Morocco. She began her career in film and television in 2008, in Morocco. In 2011, she played the leading role in the film L'amante du rif, achieving recognition in her native country. That same year she moved to Montréal, Canada, where she studied acting and film production. Kounda has been featured in national and international film and television productions.

== Filmography ==
- L'amante du rif as Aya
- Rabat in a supporting role (Nasrdin Dchar won a Gouden Kalf best actor award for his performance in this film.)
- Mistaken as Layla Atta-Bassir
