= Faouzi Bensaïdi =

Moroccan film director

Faouzi Bensaïdi فوزي بن السعيدي
- Born: 14 March 1967 (age 59); Meknes, Morocco
- Occupations: Film director, actor, screenwriter
- Years active: 1997–present
- Known for: A Thousand Months

Faouzi Bensaïdi (Arabic: فوزي بن السعيدي; born 14 March 1967) is a Moroccan film director, actor, screenwriter and artist.

== Career ==
His film A Thousand Months was screened in the Un Certain Regard section at the 2003 Cannes Film Festival.

In 2007 and 2009 he has taken part in the Arts in Marrakech Festival showing and discussing his films and installations.

In 2011, his film Death for Sale premiered at the Toronto International Film Festival in September. The film was selected as the Moroccan entry for the Best Foreign Language Oscar at the 85th Academy Awards, but it did not make the final shortlist.

In 2023–2024, he was a resident at the Casa de Velázquez in Madrid.

== Influences ==
Bensaïdi participated in the 2022 edition of the Sight & Sound film polls, which are held every 10 years to commemorate the greatest films of all time and rank them in order. Directors and critics both give their 10 favorite films of all time for the poll; Bensaïdi picked Citizen Kane (1941), 8½ (1963), North by Northwest (1959), Modern Times (1936), Ran (1985), Playtime (1967), Raging Bull (1980), The Godfather (1972), Le Samouraï (1967), and À bout de souffle (1960).

== Selected filmography ==
- A Thousand Months (Mille mois) - 2003
- WWW: What a Wonderful World - 2006
- Death for Sale - 2011
- Volubilis - 2017
- Deserts (Déserts) - 2023
