= Regard d'or =

The Regard d'or is the Grand Prize of the Fribourg International Film Festival

== Award winners ==
=== Distribution’s help Award: 1986-1994 ===
- 1986 : Wend Kuuni (God's Gift) by Gaston Kaboré Burkina Faso
- 1988 : The Horse Thief (Dao Ma Tse) by Tian Zhuangzhuang China
- 1988 : La Lumière (Yeelen) by Souleymane Cissé Mali
- 1990 : Piravi by Shaji N. Karun India
- 1992 : Ganh Xiec Rong by Việt Linh Vietnam
- 1993 : The Night (Al Leil) by Mohammad Malas Syria
- 1993 : Xuese Qingchen by Li Shaohong China
- 1994 : Kosh ba kosh by Bakhtiar Khudojnazarov Tajikistan
- 1994 : The Puppetmaster (Ximeng Rensheng) by Hou Hsiao-hsien Taiwan

=== Grand Prize: 1995-1997 ===
- 1995 : Madagascar by Fernando Pérez Cuba
- 1995 : Quiereme y veras by Daniel Díaz Torres Cuba
- 1996 : Don't Die Without Telling Me Where You're Going (No te mueras sin decirme adónde vas) by Eliseo Subiela Argentina
- 1997 : Nuages de pluie sur Wushan: l'attente by Ming Zhang China

=== Grand Prix "Le Regard d'or": 1998-today ===
- 1998 : Pizza, Beer, and Cigarettes by Adrián Caetano Argentina
- 1998 : Who the Hell Is Juliette? by Carlos Marcovich Mexico
- 1999 : La Vie Sur Terre by Abderrahmane Sissako Mauritania
- 2000 : The Bird Who Stops in the Air (Saeneun pyegoksuneul keruinda) by Jeon Soo-il South Korea
- 2001 : Et un et deux (Yi yi) by Edward Yang Taiwan
- 2002 : Camel(s) by Park Ki-Yong South Korea
- 2003 : Intimate Stories (Historias mínimas) by Carlos Sorín Argentina
- 2004 : Días de Santiago (Days of Santiago) de Josué Méndez Peru
- 2005 : Night of Truth (La Nuit de la vérité) by Fanta Régina Nacro Burkina Faso France
- 2006 : Gradually (Be Ahestegui) by Maziar Miri Iran
- 2007 : Alice's House by Chico Teixeira Brazil
- 2008 : Flower in the Pocket by Liew Seng Tat Malaysia
- 2009 : My Magic by Eric Khoo Singapore
- 2010 : The Other Bank (Gagma napiri) by George Ovashvili Georgia
- 2011 : Poetry by Lee Chang-dong South Korea
- 2012 : Never Too Late (Af Paam Lo Meuchar) by Ido Fluck Israel
- 2013 : Three Sisters (San Zimei) by Wang Bing France China
- 2014 : Han Gong-ju by Lee Su-jin South Korea
- 2015 : González by Christian Díaz Pardo Chili
- 2016 : Mountain by Yaelle Kayam Israel
- 2017 : Apprentice by Boo Junfeng Singapore, Hong Kong, Qatar, Germany, France
- 2018 : Black Level by Valentyn Vasyanovych Ukraine
- 2019 : The Good Girls by Alejandra Márquez Abella Mexico
- 2020 : You Will Die at Twenty by Amjad Abu Alala Sudan
- 2021 : Night of the Kings by Philippe Lacôte Côte d'Ivoire, France, Canada, Senegal
