= 57th Locarno Film Festival =

Film festival in Locarno, Switzerland

- Location: Locarno, Switzerland
- Founded: 1946
- Awards: Golden Leopard: Private directed Saverio Costanzo
- Artistic director: Irene Bignardi
- Festival date: Opening: 4 August 2004; Closing: 14 August 2004
- Website: LFF

Locarno Film Festival
- 58th 56th

The 57th Locarno Film Festival was held from 4 to 14 August 2004 in Locarno, Switzerland. This year at the festival was noteworthy for its political films and documentaries, including The Hunting of the President and Control Room which juxtaposed media coverage of the Iraq war between American new agencies and Al Jazeera. Journalist Carl Bernstein attended the Control Room screening and participated in the panel discussion that followed. Seventeen films were set to screen on the Piazza Grande, the 7,000 seat open-air theater, but rain forced many showings inside.

The Golden Leopard, the festival's top prize, was awarded to the Private directed Saverio Costanzo, which focuses on a Palestinian family whose home is occupied by the Israeli military.

== Official Jury ==
- Rene Burri, Swiss Photographer
- Sabiha Sumar, Pakistani director
- Udo Kier, German actor and director
- Oliver Assayas, French director
- Yu Lik-Wai, Hon Kong director
- Tilde Corsi, Italian Producer
- David Robinson, U.K. film critic

== Sections ==
The following films were screened in these sections:

=== Piazza Grande ===
English Title	Original Title	Director(s)	Year	Production Country
All The President's Men		Alan J. Pakula	1976	USA
Appleseed		Shinji Aramaki	2004	Japan
Asambhav		Rajiv Rai	2004	India
Singing Behind Screens	Cantando Dietro I Paraventi	Ermanno Olmi	2003	Italia
The Ninth Day	Der Neunte Tag	Volker Schlöndorff	2004	Germany, Luxembourg
Dogora		Patrice Leconte	2004	France
The Syrian Bride	Hacala Hasurit	Eran Riklis	2004	Israel, France, Germany
King's Game	Kongekabale	Nikolaj Arcel	2004	Denmark
The Girl and the Clouds	La Jeune Fille Et Les Nuages	Georges Schwizgebel	2000	Switzerland
The Rain Children	Les Enfants De La Pluie	Philippe Leclerc	2003	France
Misspellings	Les Fautes D'Orthographe	Jean-Jacques Zilbermann	2004	France
Locarno the Ideal City. Vittorio Storaro's Luminist Project	Locarno La Città Ideale. Progetto Luministico Di Vittorio Storaro	Jan Godav, Paolo Spalluto	2004	Switzerland
Oh Happy Day		Hella Joof	2004	Denmark, Great Britain
Burn!	Queimada	Picci Pontecorvo,Gillo Pontecorvo	1970	Italia, USA
Samsara		Pan Nalin	2001	Germany, Italia, France, India
Only Human	Seres Queridos	Teresa De Pelegri, Dominic Harari	2004	Spain, Great Britain, Argentina, Portugal
Sweet Smell of Success		Alexander Mackendrick	1957	USA
The Bourne Supremacy		Paul Greengrass	2004	USA
The Football Factory		Nick Love	2004	Great Britain, Germany
The Hunting of the President		Nickolas Perry, Harry Thomason	2004	USA
The Notebook		Nick Cassavetes	2003	USA

=== International Competition ===
English Title	Original Title	Director(s)	Year	Production Country
André Valente		Catarina Ruivo	2004	Portugal
Antares		Spielmann Goetz	2004	Austria
Black Friday		Anurag Kashyap	2004	India
Story Undone	Dastan Natamam	Hassan Yektapanah	2004	Iran, Ireland, Singapour
En Garde		Ayse Polat	2004	Germany
Private Madness	Folie Privée	Joachim Lafosse	2004	Belgium
Forgiveness		Ian Gabriel	2004	South Africa
The Buffalo Boy	Gardien De Buffles	Minh Nguyen-Vô	2004	France, Belgium, Vietnam
McDull, the Alumni		Samson Chiu, Toe Yuen	2004	Hong Kong
The Hunter	Okhotnik	Serik Aprymov	2004	Kazakhstan, Japan, France, Switzerland, Netherlands
Ordo		Laurence Ferreira-Barbosa	2004	France, Canada, Portugal
Poster Boy		Zak Tucker	2004	USA
Why (not) Brazil	Pourquoi (Pas) Le Brésil	Laetitia Masson	2004	France
Private		Saverio Costanzo	2003	Italia
Promised Land		Michael Beltrami	2004	Switzerland, Italia
Tony Takitani		Jun Ichikawa	2004	Japan
The Wedding	Wesele	Wojciech Smarzowski	2004	Poland
Yasmin		Kenny Glenaan	2004	Great Britain, Germany

=== Filmmakers of the Present ===
The Concorso Cineasti del Presente, also known as the Filmmakers of the Present Competition, showcases films from emerging filmmakers.

Filmmakers of the Present

Original Title	English Title	Director(s)	Year	Production Country
Absolut			2004	Switzerland
Après Mûre Réflexion	After Blackberry Reflection	Mia Hansen-Løve	2004	France
Casshern		Kazuaki Kiriya	2004	Japan
Ceský Sen	Czech Dream	Vít Klusák, Filip Remunda	2004	Czech Republic
Cielo Azul Cielo Negro	Black Sky Black Sky	Sabrina Farji, Paula de Luque	2004	Argentina
Cinevardaphoto: Salut Les Cubains	Cinevardaphoto: Hi Cubans	Agnès Varda	1963	France
Cinevardaphoto: Ulysse		Agnès Varda	1982	France
Cinevardaphoto: Ydessa, Les Ours Et Etc...	Cinevardaphoto: Ydessa, Bears and Etc ...	Agnès Varda	2004	France
Cinevardaphoto		Agnès Varda		
Die Josef Trilogie	The Joseph Trilogy	Thomas Woschitz		Austria
Die Josef Trilogie - Part I	The Joseph Trilogy - Part 1	Thomas Woschitz	1995	Austria
Die Josef Trilogie - Part 2 Blindgaenger	The Josef Trilogie - Part 2 Blindgaenger	Thomas Woschitz	1996	Austria
Die Josef Trilogie - Part 3 Girls + Cars		Thomas Woschitz	2004	Austria
Dig!		Ondi Timoner	2003	USA
Geister Und Gäste	Ghosts and Guests		1989	Switzerland
Greendale		Bernard Shakey	2003	USA
Le Cou De Clarisse	Clarisse's Neck	Benjamin Esdraffo	2003	France
Le Pont Des Arts	The Pont Des Arts	Eugène Green	2004	France
Meditations On Revolution Part I: Lonely Planet		Robert Fenz	1997	USA
Meditations On Revolution Part II: The Space In Between		Robert Fenz	1997	USA
Meditations On Revolution Part III: Soledad		Robert Fenz	2001	USA
Meditations On Revolution Part IV: Greenville, Ms		Robert Fenz	2001	USA
Meditations On Revolution Part V: Foreign City		Robert Fenz	2003	USA
Mystification Ou L'Histoire Des Portraits	Mystification or the History of Portraits	Sandrine Rinaldi	2003	France
Somewhere In Between		Pierre Coulibeuf	2004	France, Belgium
Still, The Children Are Here		Dinaz Stafford	2004	India, USA
Survive Style 5+		Gen Sekiguchi	2004	Japan
Szezon	Season	Ferenc Török	2003	Hungary
Tang Shi / Tang Poetry		Lu Zhang	2004	South Korea, China
Tenja		Hassan Legzouli	2004	France, Morocco
Twisted Tango		Tommaso Cardile, Francesco Carrozzini	2004	Italia, France
Un Cuento Chino	A Chinese Story		2003	Spain
Uncovered: The War on Iraq		Robert Greenwald	2004	USA
Une Visite Au Louvre	A Visit to the Louvre	Danièle Huillet, Jean-Marie Straub	2003	France
Vertical Air		Robert Fenz	1996	USA

==== Video Section ====
Video - Filmmakers of the Present (Cineasti del Presente)
Original Title	English Title	Director(s)	Year	Production Country
14 Episodes		Murad Mazaev	2004	Georgia, Netherlands
Appunti Romani	Roman Notes	Marco Bertozzi	2004	Italia
Belvedere		Arnold Pasquier	2004	France
Cap Esterel		Antoine Page	2003	France
Cinquecentomila Leoni - Le Ultime Ore Di J.W. Ovvero Tarzan Ovvero J.W.	Five Hundred Thousand Lions - The Last Hours of J.W. that is Tarzan or J.W.	Andrea Liberovici, Aldo Nove	2004	Italia
Contretemps			2004	France
Détour De Seta		Salvo Cuccia	2004	Italia
Electronic Performers		Bruno Dunckel	2003	France
Faibles Amusements	Low Amusements		2004	France
Frammenti Di Novecento	Fragments of Twentieth Century	Francesco (Citto) Maselli	2004	Italia
François Truffaut, Une Autobiographie	François Truffaut, an Autobiography	Anne Andreu	2004	France
How Arnold Won The West		Alex Cooke	2003	France, Great Britain
Incident at Loch Ness		Zak Penn	2003	USA
L'Apprendista	The Apprentice	Giacomo Gatti	2004	Italia
La Pattuglia Del Passo S. Giacomo	The Patrol of the S. Giacomo Pass	Ermanno Olmi	1954	Italia
Les Accords D'Alba	Alba Agreements	Vincent Dieutre	2004	France
Les Quinze Élèves	Fifteen Students	Jacques Meilleurat	2004	France
Manon: Finestra 2	Manon: Window 2	Ermanno Olmi	1956	Italia
Riccardo		Bruno Bigoni	2004	Italia
Sankofa	Sankova	Kevin Merz	2004	Switzerland
Strade Blu. Storie Dalla Provincia Americana	Blue Roads. Stories from the American Province	Francesco Conversano, Nene Grignaffini	2004	Italia
Sun And Moon And The God Of Rain		Anna Elisabetta Pitscheider	2004	India, Italia
The Pornographer (A Love Story)		Alan Wade	2004	USA
There Is No Direction		Sarah Bertrand	2004	France
Turi	Have to	Lotty Wohlwend	2004	Switzerland
Un'Altra Città	Another City	Carlo Ippolito	2003	Switzerland
Vernissages	Glazing	Mathieu Lis	2003	France
Visions Of Europe			2004	Union Européenne
Walker		Villi Hermann	2004	Switzerland

=== Open Doors ===
Open Doors - Mekong

Original Title	English Title	Director(s)	Year	Production Country
Apsara		Norodom Sihanouk	1966	Cambodia
Ben Khong Chong		Trong Ninh Luu	2002	Germany
Chiec Chia Khoa Vang	The Wine Division	Lê Hoàng	2000	Vietnam
Chung Cu	Chung	Linh Viet	1999	Vietnam
Crepuscule	Twilight	Norodom Sihanouk	1969	Cambodia
Cuoc Xe Dem	Dem	Chuyen Bui Thac	2002	Vietnam
Doi Cat	Two Cat	Thanh Van Nguyen	1999	Vietnam
Gai Nhay	Thorns	Lê Hoàng	2003	Vietnam
Hanoi - 12 Ngay Dem	HANOI - 12 Days Dem	Dinh Hac Bui	2002	Vietnam
Hanoi-Nua Dong Nam 46	Hanoi-Nua Dong Nam		1997	Vietnam
Khuamvang Khong Mina		Phanouvong Chanthone	1999	Laos
Ky Uc Dien Bien	Ky Uc Dien Well	Do min Tuan	2004	Vietnam
La Terre Des Ames Errantes	The Land of Wandering Souls	Rithy Panh	2002	France
Markhang Phao Lenetene		Som Ock Southiphonh	1994	Laos
Moto Thief		Lo K.M.	2004	Cambodia
Norodom Sihanouk, Roi Cineaste	Northern Sihanuk	Jean-Baptiste Martin	1997	France
Ombre Sur Angkor	Shadow on Angkor	Norodom Sihanouk	1967	Cambodia
Thung Lung Hoang Van	Valley	Nhue Giang Pham	2002	Vietnam
Thuong Nho Dong Que			1995	Vietnam
Troi Lai Ngu Thuy	Lai Lai Ngu Thuy	Manh Thich Le	1998	Vietnam
Un Soir Apres La Guerre	One Evening after the War	Rithy Panh	1997	France
Vua Ba Rac	King Ba Rac	Minh Tuan Do	2003	Vietnam
Yark Hai Lok Ni Khio	Yark Hai Lok Ni Kahio	Hongnakhone Thoumphala	1998	Laos

=== Leopards of Tomorrow ===
Leopards of Tomorrow (Pardi di Domani)

Leopards of Tomorrow - Francophonia Competition
Original Title	English Title	Director(s)	Year	Production Country
Alice Et Moi	Alice and Me	Micha Wald	2004	Belgium
Bè Kunko	Be a Problem	Cheick Fantamady Camara	2004	France, Guinea
C'Est L'Histoire D'Un Belge	This is the Story of a Belgian	Rodrigo Litorriaga	2003	Belgium
Cousines	Cousins	Lyes Salem	2003	France
Dans L'Ombre	In the Shadows	Olivier Masset-Depasse	2004	Belgium, France, Switzerland
De L'Autre Côté	On the Other Side	Nassim Amaouche	2003	France
Dies Irae	Day of Anger	Alexandre Astier	2003	France
Déformation Personelle	Personal Deformation	Jean-François Asselin	2003	Canada
En Route Mauvaise Troupe	On the Way Bad Troop	Camille Bialestowski	2003	France
Hit and Run		Richard Jutras	2002	Canada
Hymne À La Gazelle	Gazelle Hymn	Stéphanie Duvivier	2003	France
Infini	Infinity	Guillaume Fortin	2002	Canada
Koro		Guldem Durmaz	2002	Belgium
L'Autre Combat	The Other Fight	Emmanuel Ortner	2003	France
L'Âge De Raison	The Age of Reason	Myriam Aziza	2004	France
La Cérémonie	The Ceremony	Miryam Bouchard	2003	Canada
La Séquence Silverstein	The Silverstein Sequence	Jean-Luc Gason	2003	Belgium
Le Droit Chemin	The Right Path	Mathias Gokalp	2004	France
Le Léopard Ne Se Déplace Jamais Sans Ses Tâches	The Leopard Never Moves without Its Tasks	Héléna Klotz	2003	France
Le Pays Des Ours	The Land of Bears	Jean Baptiste Leonetti	2003	France
Le Principe Du Canapé	The Principle of the Sofa	Mike Guermyet, Samuel Hercule	2003	France
Le Secret De Fatima	Le Secret of Fatima	Karim Bensalah	2003	France, Algérie
Léo	Ingenious	Nicolas Roy	2003	Canada
Mamaman	To the Mother	Iao Lethem	2002	Belgium
Matin Calme	Calm Morning	Annick Ghijzelings	2004	Belgium
Noël Blank		Jean-François Rivard	2003	Canada
Pacotille	Junk	Eric Jameux	2003	France
Poulet Cocotte	Chicken	Vincent Solignac, Martial Vallanchon	2003	France
Safi La Petite Mère	Safi the Little Mother	Rasò Ganemtore	2004	Italia, Burkina Faso
Francophonia Retrospective
A Lucy		Maki J. Algen, Radha-Rajen Jaganathen	1993	Mauritius
Anton Webern		Thierry Knauff	1991	Belgium
Atomic Saké		Louise Archambault	1999	Canada
Aélia	Aerial	Dominique De Rivaz	1985	Ch
Bouzie	Bourse	Jacques Trabi	1996	Ivory Coast
Crac	Crack	Frédéric Back	1981	Canada
Essai D'Ouverture	Opening Test	Luc Moullet	1988	France
Faux Contact		Eric Jameux	2000	France
Fois de canard et cœur de femme	Side Orders	Stéphane Lapointe	2001	Canada
Hammam		Florence Miailhe	1991	France
J'Adore Le Cinema	I Love the Cinema	Vincent Lannoo	1998	Belgium
Jean-Fares		Lyes Salem	2001	France
Juke-Bar		Martin Barry	1989	Canada
Kuproquo		Jean-François Rivard	1999	Canada
L'Autre Celia	The Other Celia	Irène Jouanet	1991	France
L'Horizon Perdu	The Horizon Wasted	Laïla Marrakchi	2000	France
L'Interview		Xavier Giannoli	1997	
La Falaise	The Cliff	Faouzi Bensaïdi	1998	France
La Nef	The Nave	Claude Champion	1988	Ch
La Plage	Beach	Patrick Bokanowski	1992	France
Le Cheval De Fer	The Iron Horse	Gérald Frydman	1984	Belgium
Le Clandestin	The Clandestine	José Laplaine	1996	Congo
Le Goûter De Bébé	Baby Snack	Richard Lacombe	2003	Canada
Le Mariage En Papier	Paper Wedding	Stéphanie Duvivier	2000	France
Le P'Tit Bal	The Little Ball	Philippe Decouflé	1993	France
Le Pendule De Madame Foucault	Madame Foucault's Pendulum	Jean-Marc Vervoort	1994	Belgium
Le Petit Chat Est Mort	The Little Cat is Dead	Fejria Deliba	1991	France
Le Petit Garçon Qui Vola La Lune	The Little Boy Who Flew the Moon	Gisèle Ansorge, Ernest Ansorge	1988	Ch
Le Symbole	The Symbol	Ahmadou Diallo	1994	Senegal
Les Mots Magiques	Magical Words	Jean-Marc Vallée	1998	Canada
Mi-Temps	Half-Time	Mathias Gokalp	2001	France
Michu		Denis Rabaglia	1993	Ch
Omnibus		Sam Karman	1992	France
Pic Pic Andre Shoow The First		Stéphane Aubier, Vincent Patar	1995	Belgium
Point De Fuite	Leakage Point	Oliver Smolders	1988	Belgium
Pourquoi	For What	Idrissa Ouédraogo	1981	Burkina Faso
Premier Noël	First Christmas		1999	France
Raddem			1998	France
Rue Tartarin	Tartarin Street	Okacha Touita	1980	Algérie
Son Jour À Elle	Her Day	Frédéric Mermoud	1998	Ch
Sortie De Bain	Bathing	Florence Henrard	1995	Belgium
Surveiller Les Tortues	Turtle	Ines Rabadan	1999	Belgium
Taxi Service		Elie Khalifé, Alexandre Monnier	1996	Ch
Tous À Table	All at the Table	Ursula Meier	2000	Ch
Trois Fables A L'Usage Des Blancs En Afrique	Three Fables for the Use of Whites in Africa	Claude Gnakouri, Luis Marques	1998	France
Tueur De Petits Poissons	Small Fish Killer	Alexandre Gavra	1997	France
Un Certain Matin	A Certain Morning	Fanta Régina Nacro	1992	Burkina Faso
Un Taxi Pour Aouzou	A Taxi for Aouzou	Issa Serge Coelo	1994	Chad
È Pericoloso Sporgersi	It is Dangerous to Lean	Jaco Van Dormael	1984	Belgium
Leopards of Tomorrow (Pardi di Domani) - Swiss Competition
Original title	English title	Director(s)	Year	Production country
3Ème Sous-Sol	3rd Basement	Olivier Girard	2003	Switzerland
Bad News		Christian Rösch	2004	Switzerland
Berlin Backstage		Stéphanie Chuat, Véronique Reymond	2003	Germany
Black Lights		Anthony Vouardoux	2003	Switzerland
Chyenne	Cheyenne	Alexander Meier	2004	Switzerland
Come Closer		Pierre Monnard	2004	Switzerland
Complotto	Plot	Thierry Moro	2003	Switzerland
Demain J'Arrête!	Tomorrow I Stop!	Nicole Borgeat	2004	Switzerland
Fenêtre	Window	Erik Bernasconi	2004	France
Hoi Maya	Hi Maya	Claudia Lorenz	2004	Switzerland
Il Re È Nudo	The King is Naked	Francesco Jost	2004	Switzerland
La Fidanzata	The Girlfriend	Petra Volpe	2004	Switzerland
La Taupe	The Taupe	Bernhard Zitz	2003	Switzerland
Le Bord De La Table	The Edge of the Table	Britta Rindelaub	2003	Switzerland
Marée Noire	Tide	Yves Pouliquen	2004	Switzerland, France
Murphy		Nicolas Veuthey	2004	Switzerland
Paul Maillard, Facteur De Langue De Bois	Paul Maillard, Wooden Language Postman	Grégoire Mayor	2004	Switzerland
Promis Juré	Juror	Tanoa Despland, Pauline Gygax	2004	Switzerland
Solus Ad Solam	Only the Only	Mauro Boscarato	2004	Switzerland
Tiger Erdolchen	Tiger Erdoltel	Moritz Gerber	2004	Switzerland
Wackelkontakt	Loose Contact	Ralph Etter	2004	Switzerland, Germany

=== Human Rights Program ===
Original Title	English Title	Director(s)	Year	Production Country
Bab El Chams		Yousry Nasrallah	2004	France, Egypt
Born Into Brothels		Zana Briski, Ross Kauffman	2004	USA
Cautiva	Captive	Gaston Biraben	2003	Argentina, USA
Citizen King		Orlando Bagwell, Noland Walker	2004	USA
Das Leid Der Andern (The Pain Of Others)	The Suffering of the Others (the Pain of Others)	Peter Egloff	2004	Switzerland
El Tren Blanco	The White Train	Nahuel Garcia, Ramiro Garcia, Sheila Perez Gimenez	2003	Argentina, Spain
Garden		Adi Barash, Ruthie Shatz	2003	Israel, USA, Finland, Denmark
Hungry For Monsters		George Csicsery	2002	USA
Mi Piace Lavorare (Mobbing)	I Like to Work (Mobbing)	Francesca Comencini	2003	Italia
Nelson Mandela Accused No.1		Pascale Lamche	2004	South Africa
Notre Musique	Our Music		2003	Switzerland, France
Persons Of Interest		Alison MacLean, Tobias Perse	2003	USA
S21, La Machine De Mort Khmère Rouge	S21, the Khmer Red Death Machine	Rithy Panh	2002	France
Two For One		Giovanni Pitscheider	2003	Italia
V-Day: Until the Violence Stops		Abby Epstein	2004	USA

=== In Progress ===
Original Title	English Title	Director(s)	Year	Production Country
... Si No Me Ahogo	... if I Don't Drown		2003	Argentina
A Morir	To Die	Miguel Angel Rios	2004	Mexico
A Night Of Prophecy		Amar Kanwar	2002	India
A Reverie Interrupted By The Police		Rodney Graham	2003	
A Season Outside		Amar Kanwar	1997	India
Abstree		Davide Lombardi	2002	Italia
Alpi In Movimento	Alps in Motion	Armin Linke	2004	Italia
Ambient		Davide Lombardi	2001	Italia
Anomal	Anomaly		2004	France
Au Bout De Wingles	At the End of Wingles	Elsa Gaudefroy-Demombynes	2004	France
City Self/Country Self		Rodney Graham	2000	France
Da Qui Sopra Il Mare	From Here above the Sea	Mauro Santini	2004	Italia
Dammi I Colori	Give Me the Colors	Anri Sala	2003	Albanie
Devenir	Become		2003	France
Dust			2004	Italia
Filter City			2003	Switzerland
Filter City			2003	Switzerland
Flor Da Baixa	Bass Flower	Mauro Santini	2004	Italia
Ilusiones De Realidad - Los Trucajes Cinematograficos De Emilio Ruiz	Reality Illusions - Emilio Ruiz's Cinematographic Trucages			Spain
Into Film2 For Painting - People I Don'T Know		Hans-Hermann Koopmann	2004	Italia, Germany
Journey Into Fear		Stan Douglas	2001	Canada, USA
La Rose De Jéricho	Jericho's Rose	Yael Perlman	2004	France
Mehmet And Mehmet		Paolo Colombo, Michela Guberti	2004	Italia
Modelling 1966 - Fragility 2003		Vittorio Armentano		Italia
Nina		Jacopo Bedogni, Nicolo Massazza	2004	Italia
Obras	Works		2004	France
Point D'Eau	Water Point	Oleg Tcherny	2004	France
Polyeucte		Christophe Atabekian	2003	France
Radio Ghost		Laurent Grasso	2004	France, China
Reve De Cheval	Horseshoe	Ariane Michel	2004	
Seamlessness		Nadia Reich	2004	France
Site Specific_Roma 04		Olivo Barbieri	2004	Italia
Staub		Monica Bonvicini, Jan Ralske	2003	Germany
Suspiria	Sigh	Stan Douglas	2002	Canada, USA
Third Generation (Ascher Family)		Mark Wallinger	2003	Great Britain
To Remember		Amar Kanwar	2003	India
Tossico Della Luce	Light Toxic	Jacopo Bedogni, Nicolo Massazza	2003	Italia
Vb52		Vanessa Beecroft	2003	Italia, USA
Vexation Island		Rodney Graham	1997	
We Have Decided Not To Die		Daniel Askill	2003	Australia

=== Newsfront Retrospective ===
Original Title	English Title	Director(s)	Year	Production Country
1974, Une Partie De Campagne	1974, Part of the Campaign	Raymond Depardon		France
Ace In The Hole / The Big Carnival		Billy Wilder	1951	USA
Alice In Den Städten	Alice in the Cities	Wim Wenders	1973	Germany
Anaparastassi	Representation		1970	Greece
Aro Tolbukhin. En La Mente Del Asesino	Tolbukhin Aro. in the Murderer's Mind	Isaac P. Racine, Agustí Villaronga, Lydia Zimmermann	2002	Mexico, Spain
Big Town - Father And Son			1953	USA
Call Northside 777		Henry Hathaway	1948	USA
Citizen Kane		Orson Welles	1941	USA
Control Room		Jehane Noujaim	2004	USA
Deadline U.S.A.		Richard Brooks	1952	USA
Der Teufelsreporter	The Daredevil Reporter	Ernst Laemmle	1929	Germany
Deux Hommes Dans Manhattan	Two Men in Manhattan	Jean-Pierre Melville	1959	France
Die Fälschung	Circle of Deceit	Volker Schlöndorff	1981	Germany, France
Die Verlorene Ehre Der Katharina Blum	The Lost Honor of Katharina Blum	Volker Schlöndorff, Margarethe von Trotta	1975	Germany
Fantômas Contre Fantômas	Fantômas Against Fantômas	Louis Feuillade	1914	France
Five Star Final		Melvin Le Roy	1931	USA
Foreign Correspondent		Alfred Hitchcock	1940	USA
Gei Wo Yi Ge Jia	Give Me A Home	Tsai Ming-liang	1991	Taiwan
Grauzone		Fredi M. Murer	1979	Switzerland
Hai Jiao Tian Ya		Tsai Ming-liang	1989	Taiwan
His Girl Friday		Howard Hawks	1940	USA
Hoa Binh			1970	France
I Tigi A Gibellina. Racconto Per Ustica	The Tigi in Gibellina. Story for Ustica	Davide Ferrario	2002	Italia
Il Caso Mattei	The Mattei Affair	Francesco Rosi	1972	Italia
Ilaria Alpi - Il Più Crudele Dei Giorni	Ilaria Alpi - The Most Cruel of the Days	Ferdinando Vicentini Orgnani	2003	Italia
Invasion Usa		Alfred A. Green	1952	USA
Inviati Speciali	Special Sent	Romolo Marcellini	1943	Italia
Jeux De Rôles À Carpentras	Role Games in Carpentras	Jean-Louis Comolli	1998	France
Judith Therpauve		Patrice Chéreau	1978	France
Kärlek Och Journalistik	Love and Journalism	Mauritz Stiller	1916	Sweden
L'Affaire Dreyfus	The Dreyfus Affair	Georges Méliès	1899	France
L'Ambassade - Film 8Mm Trouvé Dans Une Ambassade	The Embassy - 8mm Film Found in an Embassy	Chris Marker	1973	France
La Petite Vendeuse De Soleil	The Small Sun Salesman	Djibril Kebe	1999	Senegal, Switzerland, France
Le Joli Mai	Joli May	Pierre Lhomme, Chris Marker	1963	France
Le Juge Et L'Historien - L'Affaire Sofri	The Judge and the Historian - The Sofri Affair	Jean-Louis Comolli	2001	France, Italia
Le Mystère Des Roches De Kador	The Mystery of Kador's Rocks	Léonce Perret	1912	France
Loin Du Vietnam - Caméra-Oeil	Far from Vietnam - Camera -Oeil	Jean-Luc Godard	1967	France
Making a Living		Henry Lehrman	1914	USA
Medium Cool		Haskell Wexler	1969	USA
Meet John Doe		Frank Capra	1941	USA
Nedamatgah	Namatgah	Kamran Shirdel	1965	Iran
Nema-Ye Nazdik (Close Up)	Close Up	Abbas Kiarostami	1990	Iran
Newsfront		Phillip Noyce	1978	Australia
Nothing Sacred		William A. Wellman	1937	USA
Obzalovaný	Obsolete	Ján Kadár, Elmar Klos	1964	Czechoslovakia
Opération Lune	Dark Side of the Moon	William Karel	2002	France
Ostanovilsya Poyezd	The Train Stopped	Vadim Abdrashitov	1982	Russia
Park Row		Samuel Fuller	1952	USA
Raspad	Decomposition		1990	Russia, USA
Roger & Me		Michael Moore	1989	USA
Salvador Allende		Patricio Guzmán	2004	Chile, France, Belgium, Germany, Spain
Screen Directors Playhouse - Rookie Of The Year		John Ford	1955	USA
Segell Ikhtifa	Registration	Elia Suleiman	1996	Palestine
Shubun	Main Sentence	Akira Kurosawa	1950	Japan
Sob Sister		Alfred Santell	1931	USA
Stranger on the Third Floor		Boris Ingster	1940	USA
Tanner '88: Bagels With Bruce		Robert Altman		USA
Tanner '88: Child'S Play		Robert Altman		USA
Tanner '88: For Real		Robert Altman		USA
Tanner '88: Moonwalker And Bookbag		Robert Altman		USA
Tanner '88: Reality Check		Robert Altman		USA
Tanner '88: Something Borrowed, Something New		Robert Altman		USA
Tanner '88: The Boiler Room		Robert Altman		USA
Tanner '88: The Dark Horse		Robert Altman		USA
Tanner '88: The Girlfriend Factor		Robert Altman		USA
Tanner '88: The Great Escape		Robert Altman		USA
Tanner '88: The Night Of The Twinkies		Robert Altman		USA
Tehran Paietakhte Iran Ast		Kamran Shirdel		Iran
The Battle of San Pietro		John Huston	1943	USA
The Big Clock		John Farrow	1948	USA
The Captive City		Robert Wise	1952	USA
The Conversation		Francis Ford Coppola	1974	USA
The Day the Earth Caught Fire		Val Guest	1961	Great Britain
The Front Page		Lewis Milestone	1931	USA
The Kid Reporter		Alfred J. Goulding	1923	USA
The Last Hurrah		John Ford	1958	USA
The Lawless		Joseph Losey	1949	USA
The Man Who Shot Liberty Valance		John Ford	1962	USA
The Mystery of the Yellow Room		Émile Chautard	1919	USA
The Philadelphia Story		George Cukor	1940	USA
The Quiet American		Joseph L. Mankiewicz	1958	USA
The Quiet American		Phillip Noyce	2002	USA
The Revolution Will Not Be Televised		Donnacha O'Briain	2003	Ireland
The Story of G.I. Joe		William A. Wellman	1945	USA
The Thin Blue Line		Errol Morris	1988	USA
The War Game		Peter Watkins	1964	Great Britain
Tout Va Bien	Everything is Fine	Jean-Luc Godard, Jean-Pierre Gorin	1971	France
Un Shab Che Barun Umad	The Corpse is the Body	Kamran Shirdel		Iran
Under Fire		Roger Spottiswoode	1983	USA
Uzlasma	Disconnex	Oguzhan Tercan	1992	Türkiye
Videogrammes Einer Revolution	Video of a Revolution	Harun Farocki, Andrei Ujică	1992	Germany
Wag the Dog		Barry Levinson	1997	USA
While the City Sleeps		Fritz Lang	1956	USA
Wire Service - Hideout		Alvin Ganzer	1956	USA
Wo Xin Ren Shi De Peng You	My New Friends	Tsai Ming-liang	1995	Taiwan
Xiao Hai	The Kid	Tsai Ming-liang	1991	Taiwan

=== Video Competition ===
Original Title	English Title	Director(s)	Year	Production Country
About The House		Jacopo Gassman	2004	Italia
Border		Laura Waddington	2004	Great Britain, France
Conversations De Salon 1 - 2 - 3	Living Room Conversations 1 - 2 - 3	Danielle Arbid	2004	France
Csa: The Confederate States Of America		Kevin Willmott	2003	USA
Down to the Bone		Debra Granik	2004	USA
Egoshooter		Christian Becker, Oliver Schwabe	2004	Germany
Karim Patwa'S Spaceship		Karim Patwa	2004	Switzerland
Krajina Mého Srdce	The Landscape of My Heart	Jan Němec	2004	Czech Republic
La Guerra De Los Gimnasios	THE GYM WAR	Diego Lerman	2004	Argentina
Lettre Du Dernier Étage	Letter from the Top Floor	Olivier Ciechelski	2004	France
Manolo Recicla (El Señor De Los Carros)	Manolo Recycla (the Lord of the Carros)	Manolo González	2004	Spain
On The Wing		Tim White-Sobieski	2003	USA
Rua De Mao Dupla	DUPER MAO STREET	Cao Guimarães	2004	Brazil
Scirocco!		Cédric Putaggio	2004	France
Sindrome	Syndrome	Liberto Rabal	2003	Spain
Sseon Day Seoul/Sund@Y Seoul		Myung-Hoon Oh	2004	South Korea
The Franklin Abraham		Jonah Freeman	2003	Switzerland, USA

== Parallel Sections ==
=== Critics Week ===
The Semaine de la Critique is an independent section, created in 1990 by the Swiss Association of Film Journalists in partnership with the Locarno Film Festival.

Original Title	English Title	Director(s)	Year	Production Country
Calling Hedy Lamarr		Georg Misch	2004	Germany, Austria, Great Britain
Die Blutritter	The Bloodrakers	Douglas Wolfsperger	2004	Germany
Ferien Im Duett	Holidays in the Duet	Dieter Gränicher	2004	Switzerland
Gå Loss	Unload	Erik Bäfving, Magnus Gertten	2004	Sweden
Mensageiras Da Luz-Parteiras Da Amazônia	Messengers of Light-Party of the Amazon	Evaldo Mocarzel	2003	Brazil
Nocaut	Knockout	Stefano Knuchel, Ivan Nurchis	2004	Switzerland
Touch the Sound		Thomas Riedelsheimer	2004	Germany

=== Swiss Cinema ===
Swiss Cinema Center
Original Title	English Title	Director(s)	Year	Production Country
Joyeux Noël Félix!	Merry Christmas Félix!	Izabela Rieben, Sami Ben Youssef	2004	Switzerland
Cinema Rediscovered
Abxang		Mirjam von Arx		
Der Doppelte Matthias Und Seine Töchter	The Double Matthias and His Daughters	Emile Edwin Reinert, Sigfrit Steiner	1941	Switzerland
Wilder Urlaub	Wild Vacation	Franz Schnyder	1943	Switzerland

==== Appellations Swiss ====
Original Title	English Title	Director(s)	Year	Production Country
Cattolica	Catholic	Rudolph Jula	2003	Switzerland, Germany
Garçon Stupide	Stupid Boy	Lionel Baier	2004	Switzerland
Halleluja! Der Herr Ist Verrückt	Halleluja! the Lord is Crazy	Alfredo Knuchel	2004	Switzerland
Hildes Reise	Hildes Journey	Christof Vorster	2003	Switzerland
Je Suis Ton Père	I Am your Father	Michel Rodde	2003	Switzerland
L'Homme sans ombre	The Man with No Shadow	Georges Schwizgebel	2004	Switzerland, Canada
Paul S'En Va	Paul Leaves	Alain Tanner	2004	Switzerland
Sternenberg		Christoph Schaub	2003	Switzerland
Strähl		Manuel Flurin Hendry	2004	Switzerland, Germany
Verflixt Verliebt	Darn in Love	Peter Luisi	2004	Switzerland, Germany
Ässhäk - Geschichten Aus Der Sahara	Oßhäk - Stories from the Sahara	Ulrike Koch	2003	Switzerland, Germany, Netherlands

== Official Awards ==
=== International Competition ===
- Golden Leopard: Private by Saverio Costanzo
- Silver Leopard: Dastan Natamam by Hassan Yektapanah, En Garde by Ayse Polat
- Special Jury Prize: Tony Takitani by Jun Ichikawa
- Leopard for Best Actress: Plinar Ericin and Maria Kwiatkowsky in EN GARDE
- Leopard for Best Actor: Mohammad Bakri in PRIVATE

=== Piazza Grande ===
- Prix du Public UBS: Havala Hasurit / The Syrian Bride by Eran Riklis

=== Leopards of Tomorrow competition ===
- Golden Leopard, SRG SSR idée Suisse Prize, Swiss Competition: Chyenne by Alexander Meier
- Silver Leopard, Eastman Kodak Company, Swiss Competition: Wackelkontakt by Ralph Etter
- “Action Light” Prize for the Best Swiss Newcomer: Paul Maillard, Facteur De Langue De Bois by Grégoire Mayor
- Film and Video Subtitling Prize, Swiss Competition: Demain J’ARRÊTE! by Nicole Borgeat
- Golden Leopard, SRG SSR idée Suisse Prize, “The French-speaking world” Competition: Dans L’OMBRE by Olivier Masset-Depasse
- Silver Leopard, Eastman Kodak Company Prize, “The French-speaking world” Competition: Wackelkontakt by Ralph Etter
- Special Mention, “The French-speaking world” Competition: Alice Et Moi by Micha Wald

=== “Cinema e Gioventù” – Leopards of Tomorrow Jury ===
- Youth Jury Prize, “The French-speaking world” Competition: Alice Et Moi by Micha Wald

=== Youth Jury ===
- Youth Jury Prize, Swiss Competition: Wackelkontakt by Ralph Etter
- First Prize, Youth Jury Prize: Forgiveness by Ian Gabriel
- Second Prize, Youth Jury: Tony Takitani by Jun Ichikawa
- Third Prize, Youth Jury: Okhotnik by Serik Aprymov
- “The environnement is the quality of life” Prize: Gardien De Buffles by Minh Nguyen-Vô

=== Video Competition Jury ===
- Golden Leopard Video C.P Company: The Conversation by Francis Ford Coppola, Conversation De Salon 1-2-3 by Danielle Arbid

=== Ecumenical Jury ===
- Oecumenical Jury Prize: Yasmin by Kenny Glenaan
- Special Mention, Oecumenical Jury: Private by Saverio Costanzo

=== FIPRESCI Jury ===
- FIPRESCI Prize: Tony Takitani by Jun Ichikawa

=== CICAE – Art & Essai Award Jury ===
- CICAE Prize: Okhotnik by Serik Aprymov

=== Human Rights Award Jury ===
- Human Rights Prize: Forgiveness by Ian Gabriel
- Special Mention, Human Rights Prize: Citizen King by Noland Walker and Orlando Bagwell

=== NETPAC (Network for the Promotion of Asian Cinema) Jury ===
- NETPAC Prize: Dastan Natamam by Hassan Yektapanah, Okhotnki by Serik Aprymov

=== FICC Jury ===
- Don Quijote Prize: Pic Pic Andre Shoow The First by Stéphane Aubier and Vincent Patar

=== SRG SSR idée suisse | Semaine de la critique Prize ===
- SRG SSR idée Suisse Prize, Critics Week: Touch The Sound by Thomas Riederlsheimer
- Special Mention, Critic Week: Calling Hedy Lamarr by Georg Misch
