= Cinema of Burkina Faso =

- No. of screens: 10 (2009)
  - Per capita: 0.1 per 100,000 (2009)

Produced feature films (2009)
- Fictional: 4
- Animated: -
- Documentary: -

The cinema of Burkina Faso is one of the more significant in Africa, with a history that spans several decades and includes the production of many award-winning films.

== History ==
The cinema of Burkina Faso is an important part of the history of the post-colonial West African and African film industry. Burkina's contribution to African cinema started with the establishment of the film festival FESPACO (Festival Panafricain du Cinéma et de la Télévision de Ouagadougou), which was launched as a film week in 1969 and gained government support and permanent structures in 1972. It is the largest film exhibition venue in sub-Saharan Africa, with more than half a million attendees, and takes place in odd numbered years in March. Burkina is also one of the countries producing the most feature films in Africa. Many of the nation's filmmakers are known internationally and have won international prizes. For many years the headquarters of the Federation of Panafrican Filmmakers (FEPACI) was in Ouagadougou, rescued in 1983 from a period of moribund inactivity by the enthusiastic support and funding of President Thomas Sankara. In 2006 the Secretariat of FEPACI moved to South Africa but the headquarters of the organization is still in Ouagaoudougou. Between 1977 and 1987 Burkina Faso housed a regional film school, Institut d'Education Cinématographique de Ouagadougou (INAFEC), which was instigated by FEPACI and funded in part by UNESCO. But eighty percent of its funding came from the government of Burkina Faso; no other African country participated in its funding and few sent students.

== Today's cinema ==
In the late 1990s, local private production companies began to proliferate and digital production became increasingly prevalent. By 2002 over twenty-five small production companies existed in the country, many pooling their resources and expertise in order to produce. The best known directors from Burkina Faso are: Mamadou Djim Kola, Gaston Kaboré, Valérie Kaboré, Kollo Daniel Sanou, Paul Zoumbara, Emmanuel Kalifa Sanon, Pierre S. Yameogo, Idrissa Ouedraogo, Drissa Touré, Dani Kouyaté, and Fanta Régina Nacro.

== Distribution ==
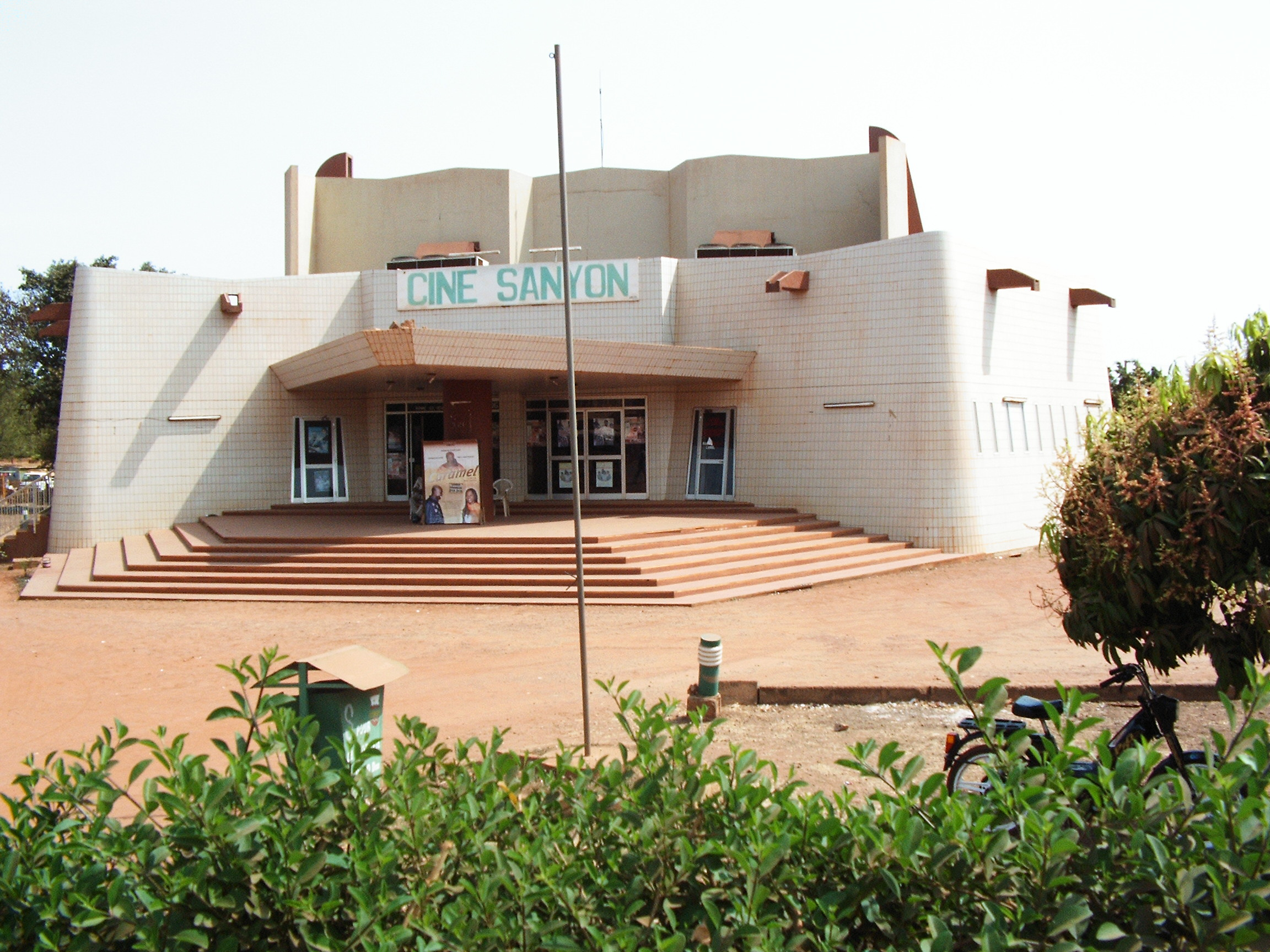
A cinema in Bobo-Dioulasso

Many films shot in Burkina Faso by local directors have found distribution in Francophone Europe and several have received assistance from the French Ministry of Co-operation. However, while these films have won awards in Europe and are regularly featured in African Studies courses, in Africa itself they are little known outside of academic circles.

== Festivals and schools ==
Burkina Faso hosts the Panafrican Film and Television Festival of Ouagadougou (FESPACO) every two years in Ouagadougou, Burkina Faso's capital.

In 2005, director Gaston Kaboré, who won the top prize at FESPACO in 1997 for his film Buud Yam, opened a training school for new filmmakers in Ouagadougou. The school, named Imagine, was built with millions of CFA of Kaboré's own money and opened its doors for the Panafrican Film and Television Festival of Ouagadougou 2005.

== Major feature films ==
- Yaaba (1989), directed by Idrissa Ouedraogo.
- Tilaï (1990), directed by Idrissa Ouedraogo.
- Wendemi, l'enfant du bon Dieu (1994), directed by S. Pierre Yameogo
- Buud Yam (1997), directed by Gaston Kaboré.
- Kini and Adams (1997), directed by Idrissa Ouedraogo.
- Garba (1998), directed by Adama Roamba.
- Silmande Tourbillon (1998), directed by S. Pierre Yaméogo.
- Le Truc De Konate (1998), directed by Fanta Regina Nacro.
- Delwende ("get up and walk") (2005), directed by S. Pierre Yameogo.

== See also ==
- Cinema of the world
- Cinema of Africa
- Cinema of Senegal
- Cinema of the Democratic Republic of the Congo
- World cinema
