= Naky Sy Savané =

Ivorian actress (born 1970)

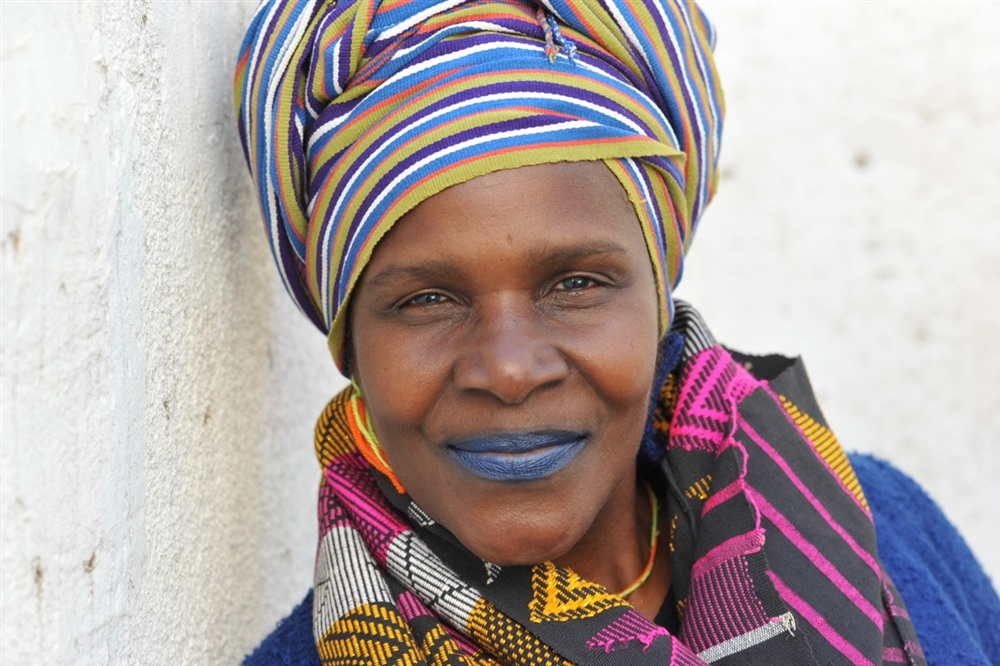
- Born: 1970
- Occupation: Actor

Naky Sy Savané (born 1970) is a film, television, and stage actress from Côte d'Ivoire.

The granddaughter of an imam, Naky Sy Savané became an actress despite conservative Muslim prejudice against the profession. She played numerous stage roles, including in Jean Racine's Britannicus and the title role in Jean Anouilh's Antigone. She credits film director Henri Duparc for discovering her in the theater and starting her film career. For her performance in Au Nom du Christ (1993), she was awarded Best Actress at the 1994 Festival du Cinéma Africain de Khouribga. In Fanta Régina Nacro's La Nuit de la vérité (2004), she plays Emma, the wife of the president of a fictional country in the midst of a civil war who loses her young son in a massacre.

In 2023, she starred as Mariama Diop, the mother of the protagonist Assane Diop, in the third season of the French television show Lupin.

== Filmography ==
- 1987 : Les Guérisseurs, dir. Sidiki Bakaba
- 1988 : Bal Poussière ("Dancing in the Dust"), dir. Henri Duparc
- 1990 : Le Sixième Doigt, dir. Henri Duparc
- 1993 : Au nom du Christ ("In the Name of Christ"), dir. Roger Gnoan M'bala
- 1994 : Afrique, mon Afrique, dir. Idrissa Ouedraogo
- 1997 : La Jumelle ("The Twin"), dir. Diaby Lanciné
- 2002 : Moolaadé, dir. Ousmane Sembène
- 2004 : La Nuit de la vérité ("The Night of Truth"), dir. Fanta Régina Nacro
- 2017 : Frontières dir. Apolline Traoré
