= Koutouan =

Koutouan is a surname. Notable people with the surname include:

- Adrienne Koutouan (born 1969), Ivorian comedian and actress
- Antonin Koutouan (born 1983), Ivorian footballer
- Michaela Koutouan (born 1990), Ivorian footballer
- Vanessa Koutouan (born 1988), Ivorian women's rights activist
