= Bamba Bakary =

Ivorian actor

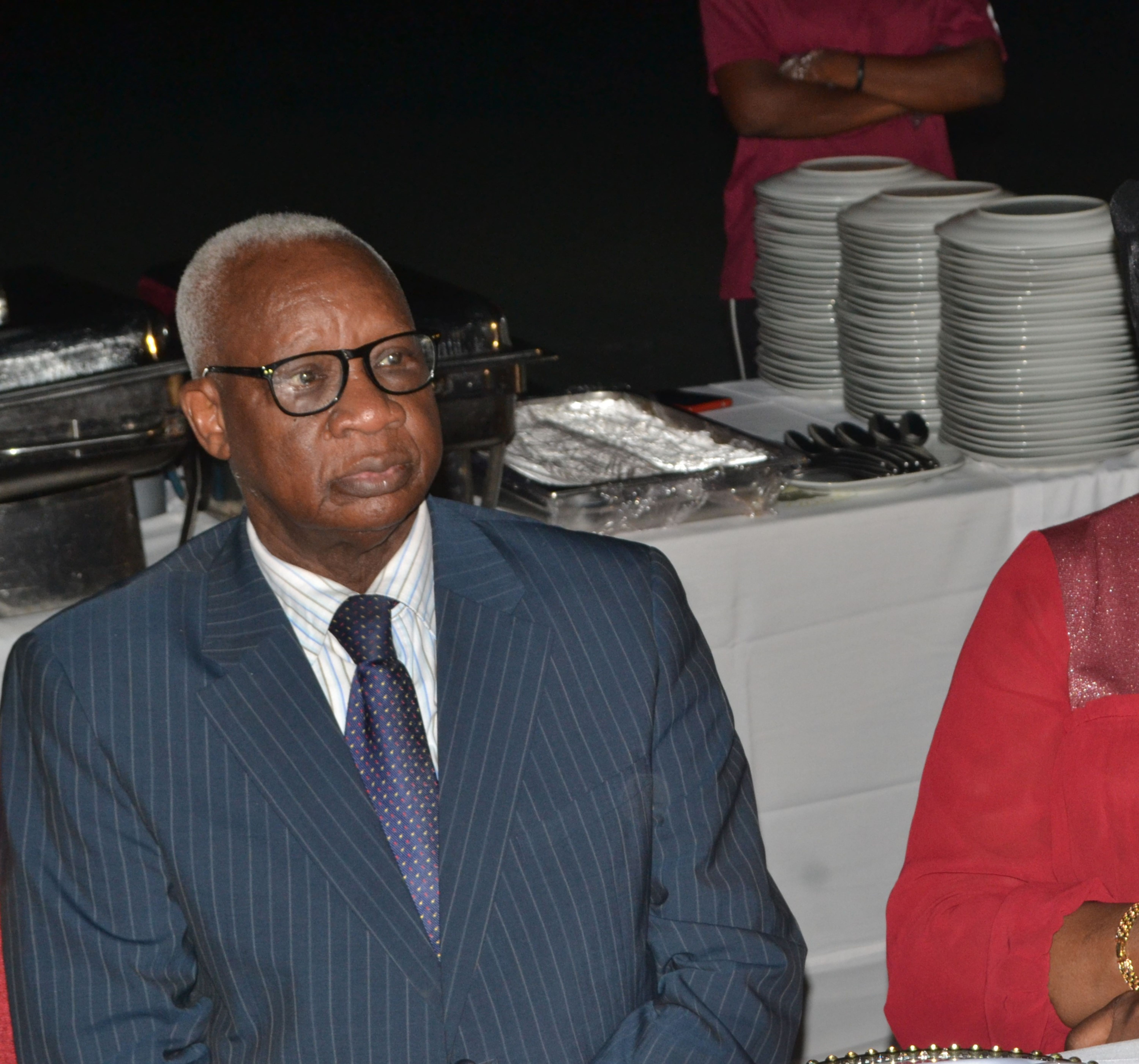
- Occupations: actor, television presenter

Bamba Bakary is an Ivorian actor, comedian and television presenter from the Ivory Coast.

Formerly an air steward for Air Afrique, Bakary became an ambassador for the prevention of AIDS for Africans, including in his role as Moussa, in Moussa le taximan. He is also the presenter of three shows on La Première (RTI) : Tonnerre which is shown regularly, Le bon vieux temps and Bonne cuisine.

== Filmography ==
- 1988 : Dancing in the Dust, by Henri Duparc
- 1990 : Le Sixième Doigt, by Henri Duparc
- 2008- : Coup de force
- 2008- : Dr Boris
