= René Chénier =

Canadian film producer

- Occupation: Film producer Executive producer
- Organization: National Film Board of Canada

René Chénier is a Canadian film producer and an executive producer for the National Film Board of Canada.

Chénier co-produced Benoît Pilon's 2008 film The Necessities of Life, and was nominated for the Genie Award for Best Motion Picture. In 2012, he won a Genie Award for Best Animated Short for Georges Schwizgebel's Romance.

From 2006, Chénier was an executive producer for the French animated studio for the National Film Board. In 2014, he was appointed executive producer for special projects.

His 2017 credits include the planetarium production Kyma directed by Philippe Baylaucq and the multi-screen installation Expo 67 Live, directed by Karine Lanoie-Brien.
