= Peter Schlemihl =

1814 novella by Adelbert von Chamisso

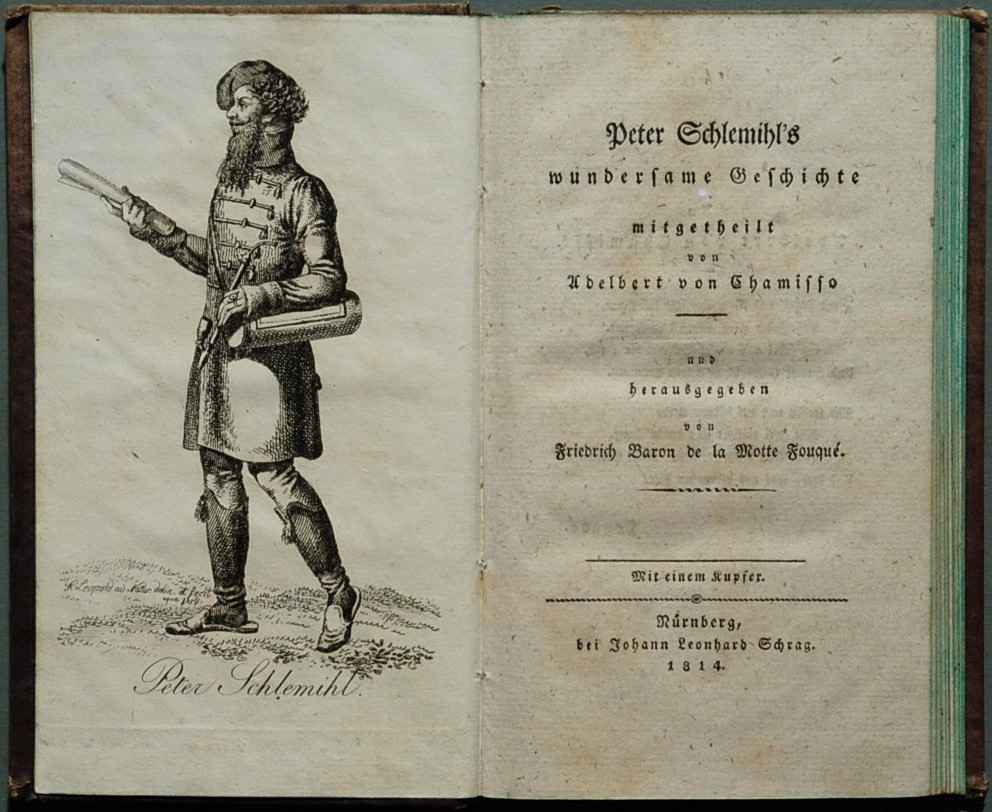
- First edition frontispiece
- Author: Adelbert von Chamisso
- Original title: Peter Schlemihls wundersame Geschichte
- Translator: Leopold von Loewenstein-Wertheim
- Language: German
- Publication date: 1814
- Publication place: Germany
- ISBN: 978-1-84749-080-3
- OCLC: 246906885

Peter Schlemihl is the title character of an 1814 novella, Peter Schlemihls wundersame Geschichte (Peter Schlemihl's Miraculous Story), written in German by exiled French aristocrat Adelbert von Chamisso.

== Plot ==
In the story, Schlemihl sells his shadow to the Devil for a bottomless wallet (the gold sack of Fortunatus), only to find that a man without a shadow is shunned by human societies. The woman he loves rejects him, and he himself becomes consumed with guilt. Yet when the devil offers to return his shadow to him in exchange for his soul, Schlemihl, as the friend of God, rejects the proposal and throws away the bottomless wallet besides. He seeks refuge in nature and travels around the world in scientific exploration, with the aid of seven-league boots. When overtaken with sickness, he is reconciled with his fellow men, who take care of him, and in regard for his sickness do not look for his shadow. Finally, however, he returns to his studies of nature and finds his deepest satisfaction in communion with nature and his own better self.

== Reception and cultural influence ==
The story, intended for children, was widely read and the character became a common cultural reference in many countries. People generally remembered the element of the shadow better than how the story ended, simplifying Chamisso's lesson to the idiom "don't sell your shadow to the Devil."

The story popularized the Yiddish word schlemiel for a hopelessly incompetent person, a bungler.

== Later retellings ==
The story was performed on American television, in a 1953 episode of Your Favorite Story, starring DeForest Kelley as the title character.

Georges Schwizgebel's 2004 paint-on-glass animation film The Man with No Shadow (L'Homme sans ombre) portrays a slight variation on the original story: after being rejected by his lover and society, the main character returns to the devil. Rather than getting back his shadow, he trades his riches for a pair of seven-league boots and travels the world in search of a place where he will be accepted without a shadow. In the end, he becomes a Wayang shadow puppeteer in Indonesia because he can manipulate the puppets directly without affecting their silhouettes.

Peter Schlemihl appears in a German-language story by Chamisso's friend (and fellow member of the Serapion Brethren) E.T.A. Hoffmann, "The New Year's Eve Adventure," published in 1815. A portion of this story, "The Story of the Lost Reflection," was adapted by French writers Jules Barbier and Michel Carré into the fourth act of their 1851 play Les contes fantastiques d'Hoffmann, then adapted by Barbier into the libretto of the Jacques Offenbach opera Les contes d'Hoffmann, in which Peter Schlemil [sic] is a romantic rival to the protagonist Hoffmann.

== Editions ==
- von Chamisso, Adelbert (2011), Peter Schlemihls wundersame Geschichte (with 25 two-tone illustrations), illustrated by Franziska Walther, Mannheim: Kunstanstifter, ISBN 978-3-942795-00-5

== See also ==
- Die Frau ohne Schatten (1919), opera by Richard Strauss to a libretto by Hugo von Hofmannsthal, partly based on the Scandinavian fairy tale "The Woman Who Had No Shadow".
- Lord Dunsany (1926), The Charwoman's Shadow (novel)
- Peter Pan
- The Shadow (fairy tale)
