= Erlking (film) =

2015 animated short film directed by Georges Schwizgebel

- Directed by: Georges Schwizgebel
- Screenplay by: Georges Schwizgebel
- Based on: "Erlkönig" by Johann Wolfgang von Goethe
- Produced by: Georges Schwizgebel
- Cinematography: Georges Schwizgebel
- Edited by: Georges Schwizgebel
- Production company: Studio GDS
- Release date: August 2015
- Running time: 6 minutes
- Country: Switzerland

Erlking (French: Le roi des aulnes; German: Erlkönig) is a 2015 Swiss animated short film directed by Georges Schwizgebel. It is an adaptation of the poem "Erlkönig" by Johann Wolfgang von Goethe, about a father who rides with his sick son who thinks he sees the erlking, and features music from Franz Schubert's setting of the poem. The music is performed by Louis Schwizgebel, the director's son.

The film was made with cel animation and uses distinct visual styles to represent each character. It received multiple festival awards in 2015 and 2016, as well as the Swiss Film Award for Best Animation Film.

== Plot ==
A father rides through a forest carrying his sick child. The child, in his fever, thinks he sees the erlking from folklore, which fascinates and scares him. The father tries to comfort the son. The erlking tries to lure the son to join him and eventually grabs him and attacks him, making the child panic. The father hurries to his destination, but the child dies. There is no spoken or sung language in the film, but a brief synopsis in three languages during the opening credits.

== Production ==
Georges Schwizgebel got the idea to adapt Johann Wolfgang von Goethe's 1782 poem "Erlkönig" for film when his son, the pianist Louis Schwizgebel, performed Franz Schubert's "Erlkönig" in China. Louis Schwizgebel explained to the audience that the story is based on four characters: the narrator, the father, the son and the erlking. Georges Schwizgebel wanted to express this by using distinct visuals for each character.

The film was produced by Schwizgebel's company Studio GDS in Geneva and was supported by Radio Télévision Suisse. Schwizgebel was the producer, writer, director, production designer, animator, cinematographer and editor. Compositing was done by Boris Rabusseau and sound mixing by Louis Schwizgebel.

The film was made with cel animation. The visual style is inspired by paintings by Henri Matisse, notably Dance (1909–1910). The animation uses loops and circular motions to evoke beginnings and ends and create an impression of a moving painting. The narrator and the father are expressed through the same visual markers. The erlking's world is represented by an unnatural blue shade and vibrant colours, and is made to progressively appear more menacing. The parts that are from the son's perspective use pastel drawings on paper, meant to recall children's drawings, and only use six images per second.

The film features Schubert's "Erlkönig" music arranged by Franz Liszt for solo piano, performed by Louis Schwizgebel. Georges Schwizgebel chose to not include the sung poem in order to not distract any viewers from the images with subtitles. The short synopsis at the beginning was added due to warnings that non-German speakers may not be familiar with the story. Before creating the final storyboard, Schwizgebel made animatics that he showed to people unfamiliar with the poem and made adjustments based on their interpretations to make the story more comprehensible.

== Reception ==
Jennifer Wolfe of Animation World Network called it "one of the most visually striking animated short films to be seen this year".

The film played at numerous film festivals in 2015 and 2016 and received several festival awards, including Best Swiss Film at Fantoche, Goldene Taube at Dok Leipzig and the Audience Choice Award at Seoul International Cartoon and Animation Festival. It received the Swiss Film Award for Best Animation Film.

== See also ==
- List of works based on Erlkönig
