= Fantoche =

Fantoche is an animation film festival with international participation that takes place annually in the city of Baden, Switzerland.

The first Fantoche took place in 1995 with the goal to enrich the Swiss cultural life with an animation film festival of international reach. Today, Fantoche has become a multidisciplinary meeting point for visual media. All kinds of different animated films, most of them Short films but some feature-length movies as well, are shown in four different cinemas.

The festival sets various priorities like the Swiss film industry, children's film, history, Asia, the US, etc. The competition program aims to challenge the artistic border of animated films and to push it forward.

== Award winner ==
In 2005, an amount of 23,000 Swiss francs was awarded in the following categories:

- High Risk – Winner Craig Welch (CA) for Welcome to Kentucky
- Hot Talent – Winner Takashi Kimura (JP) for Striking Daughter
- Best Visual – Winner JJ Villard (US) for Son of Satan
- Best Sound – Winner Dmitrij Geller (RU) for Little Night Symphony
- Best Idea/Best Script – Winner Arash Riahi (AT) for Mississippi
- Audience Award – Winner Laura Neuvonen (FI) for The last Knit and Ivan Maksimov (RU) for The Wind Along the Coast
- Minimotion – Winner Jean-Claude Campell (CH) for Metamorpho

In 2007, the prestigious jury prize was awarded to two Russian movies, which, in accordance to the jury, "particularly point out the innovative character of Russian animation films. The 10,000 francs worth main award was awarded to "Foolish Girl" by the Russian artist Zoija Kirejewa for "the celebration of a strange female character, an unconventional screenplay and its captured universality through brief moments of beautiful drawings, emotions and gestures".

In 2009, Fantoche introduced a Swiss competition with an award ("Best Swiss") and an Audience Award. One year later, the national award "High Swiss Risk" was awarded as well. Furthermore, were there two new awards for children's films after 2009; one jury award (which consisted of a five-headed children's jury) and a children's Audience Award.

== Award winners since 2009 by category ==
International Competition:

Best Film:

Year	Film title	Award Winner	Nationality and year
2009	Lucía	Cristóbal León, Joaquín Cociña, Niles Atallah	CL 2007
2010	In A Pig's Eye	Atsushi Wada	JP 2010
2011	The External World	David OReilly	DE 2010
2012	Oh Willy...	Emma De Swaef, Marc James Roels	BE/FR/NL 2012
2013	Gloria Victoria	Theodore Ushev	CA 2013
2014	The Bigger Picture	Daisy Jacobs	GB 2014
2015	World of Tomorrow	Don Hertzfeldt	US 2015
2016	Before Love	Igor Kovalyov	RU 2015
2017	The Burden	Niki Lindroth von Bahr	SE 2017
2018	Wildebeest	Nikolas Keppens, Matthias Phlips	BE 2017
2019	Daughter	Daria Kashcheeva	CZ 2019
2020	Something to Remember	Niki Lindroth von Bahr	SE 2019
2021	The Fourth Wall	Mahboobeh Kalaee	IR 2021
2022	Bird in the Peninsula	Atsushi Wada	FR / JP 2022
2023	Un genre de testament	Stephen Vuillemin	FR 2023
2024	This Is a Story Without a Plan	Cassie Shao	US 2023

Audience Award:

Year	Film title	Award Winner	Nationality and year
2009	Muto	Blu	IT 2008
2010	Sinna Mann	Anita Killi	NO 2009
2011	Bon voyage	Fabio Friedli	CH 2011
2012	Chinti	Natalia Mirzoyan	RU 2012
2013	Pandy	Matúš Vizár	SQ/CZ 2013
2014	My Own Personal Mose	Leonid Shmelkov	RU 2013
2015	Changeover	Mehdi Alibeygi	IR 2014
2016	Mr Madila	Rory Waudby-Tolley	GB 2015
2017	Negative Space	Max Porter, Ru Kuwahata	FR 2017
2018			
2019	Sweet Night	Lia Bertels	BE 2018
2020	Ties	Dina Velikovskaya	RU 2019
2021	Affairs of the Art	Joanna Quinn	GB 2020
2022	Au revoir Jérôme!	Adam Sillard, Gabrielle Selnet, Chloé Farr	FR 2022
2023	Our Uniform	Yegane Moghaddam	IR 2023
2024	Pear Garden	Shadab Shayegan	DE 2024

High Risk:

Year	Film title	Award Winner	Nationality and year
2009	Please Say Something Ezurbeltzak, una fosa común	David OReilly Izibene Oñederra	DE 2009 ES 2007
2010	Love & Theft	Andreas Hykade	DE 2010
2011	Two	Steven Subotnick	US 2011
2012	Kuhina	Joni Männisto	FI 2011
2013	Futon	Yoriko Mizushiri	JP 2012
2014	Through the Hawthorn	Anna Brenner, Pia Borg, Gemma Burditt	GB 2014
2015	Endgame	Phil Mulloy	GB 2015
2016	Monkey	Jie Shen	CN 2015
2017	Vilaine fille	Ayce Kartal	FR 2017
2018	Fest	Nikita Diakur	DE 2018
2019	Acid Rain	Tomek Popakul	PL 2019
2020	Freeze Frame	Soetkin Verstegen	SE 2019
2021	Just a Guy	Shoko Hara	DE 2020
2022	Epicenter	Heeyoon Hahm	KR 2022
2023	Our Pain	Shunsaku Hayashi	JP 2022
2024	HIC SVNT DRACONES	Justin Fayard	FR 2024

New Talent:

Year	Film title	Award Winner	Nationality and year
2009	Noteboek	Evelien Lohbeck	NL 2008
2010	Kuchao	Masaki Okuda	JP 2010
2011	Chroniques de la poisse	Osman Cerfon	FR 2010
2012	Belly	Julia Pott	GB 2011
2013	Ziegenort	Tomasz Popakul	PL 2013
2014	The Wound	Anna Budanova	RU 2013
2015	The Pride of Strathmoor	Einar Baldvin	US 2014
2016	Forever	Zhong Su	CN 2016
2017	Ugly	Nikita Diakur	DE 2017
2018	Bloeistraat 11	Nienke Deutz	BE 2018
2019	La plongeuse	Iulia Voitova	CZ 2019
2020	Précieux	Paul Mas	FR 2020
2021	Ten, Twenty, Thirty, Forty, Fifty Miles a Day	Mathieu Georis	BE 2020
2022	Sierra	Sander Joon	EE 2022
2023	Drijf	Levi Stoops	BE 2023
2024	New Talent	Tabac froid, Arthur Jamain	FR 2023

Best Story (awarded 2009-2013):

Year	Film title	Award Winner	Nationality and year
2009	Chainsaw	Dennis Tupicoff	AU 2007
2010	Divers in the Rain	Olga Pärn, Priit Pärn	EE 2010
2011	Tord och Tord	Niki Lindroth von Bahr	SE 2010
2012	The Great Rabbit	Atsushi Wada	FR/JP 2012
2013	Pandy	Matúš Vizár	SQ/CZ 2013

Best Visual:

Year	Film title	Award Winner	Nationality and year
2009	Madame Tutli-Putli	Chris Lavis, Maciek Szczerbowski	CA 2007
2010	Get Real!	Evert de Beijer	NL 2010
2011	Amar	Isabel Herguera	ES 2010
2012	What happens when children don't eat soup	Pawel Prewencki	PL 2011
2013	Bath	Tomeck Ducki	PL/GB 2013
2014	Wonder	Mirai Mizue	JP/FR 2014
2015	Erlkönig	Georges Schwizgebel	CH 2015
2016	Among the Black Waves	Anna Budanova	RU 2016
2022	Au revoir Jérôme!	Adam Sillard, Gabrielle Selnet, Chloé Farr	FR 2022
2024	Pear Garden	Shadab Shayegan	DE 2024

Best Sound:

Year	Film title	Award Winner	Nationality and year
2009	Drux Flux	Theodore Ushev	CA 2008
2010	Divers in the Rain	Olga Pärn, Priit Pärn	EE 2010
2011	Amar	Isabel Herguera	ES 2010
2012	663114	Isamu Horabayashi	JP 2012
2013	Sock Skewer Street 8	Elli Vuorinen	FI 2013
2014	Snow Hut	Yoriko Mizushiri	JP 2013
2015	Rhizome	Boris Labbé	FR 2015
2016	Any Road	Boris Labbé, Daniele Ghisi	FR 2016
2017	Impossible Figures and Other Stories II	Marta Pajek	PL 2016
2018	Solar Walk	Réka Bucsi	DK 2018
2019	Toomas Beneath the Valley of the Wild Wolves	Chintis Lundgren	EE / HR / FR 2019
2020	Cage Match	Bryan Lee	US 2019
2021	Anxious Body	Yoriko Mizushiri	FR 2021
2023	Cyclepaths	Anton Cla	BE 2023

National Competition:

Best Swiss:

Year	Film title	Award Winner	Nationality and year
2009	Flowerpots Retouches	Rafael Sommerhalder Georges Schwizgebel	GB/CH 2008 CH/CA 2008
2010	Miramare	Michaela Müller	HR/CH 2009
2011	Bon voyage	Fabio Friedli	CH 2011
2012	La Nuit de l'Ours	Samuel und Fred Guillaume	CH 2012
2013	Plug & Play	Michael Frei	CH 2013
2014	Oh Wal	Joana Locher	CH 2014
2015	Erlkönig	Georges Schwizgebel	CH 2015
2016	Das Leben ist hart	Simon Schnellmann	DE/CH 2015
2017	Airport	Michaela Müller	CH/HR 2017
2018	The Cannonball Woman	Albertine Zullo, David Toutevoix	CH / FR / CA 2017
2019	The Flood is Coming	Gabriel Böhmer	GB / CH 2018
2020	Aletsch Negative	Laurence Bonvin	CH 2019
2021	Ecorce	Samuel Patthey, Silvain Monney	CH 2020
2022	La reine des renards	Marina Rosset	CH 2022
2023	Die graue March	Charlotte Waltert, Alvaro Schoeck	CH 2023
2024	Sans voix	Samuel Patthey	CH 2024

Audience Award:

Year	Film title	Award Winner	Nationality and year
2009	Signalis	Adrian Flückiger	CH 2008
2010	Heimatland	Andrea Schneider, Loretta Arnold, Marius Portmann, Fabio Friedli	CH 2010
2011	Borderline	Dustin Rees	CH 2011
2012	La Nuit de l'Ours	Samuel und Fred Guillaume	CH 2012
2013	The Kiosk	Anete Melece	CH 2013
2014	Aubade	Mauro Carraro	CH 2012
2015	D'ombres et d'ailes	Elice Meng, Eleonora Marinoni	CH/FR 2015
2016	Analysis Paralysis	Anete Melece	CH 2016
2017	In a Nutshell	Fabio Friedli	CH 2017
2018	Drôle de poisson	Krishna Chandran A. Nair	FR / CH 2017
2019	Le dernier jour d'automne	Marjolaine Perreten	GB / CH 2018
2020	Signs	Dustin Rees	CH 2020
2021	Ecorce	Samuel Patthey, Silvain Monney	CH 2020
2022	La reine des renards	Marina Rosset	CH 2022
2023	La colline aux cailloux	Marjolaine Perreten	CH 2023
2024	Dieter	Rolf Broennimann	CH 2024

High Swiss Risk:

Year	Film title	Award Winner	Nationality and year
2010	Cronache marxiane	Laura Solari	CH 2009
2011	Logged In	Stephanie Cuérel, Joshua Schaub	CH 2010
2012	Zmitzt drin	Cecile Brun	CH 2011
2013	Washed Ashore	Jonas Ott	NL 2012
2014	Cyclopèdes	Mathieu Epiney	CH 2014
2015	Ivan's Need	Veronica L. Montaño, Manuela Leuenberger, Lukas Suter	CH 2015
2016	Analysis Paralysis	Anete Melece	CH 2016
2017	Living Like Heta	Bianca Caderas, Isabella Luu, Kerstin Zemp	CH 2017
2018	SELFIES	Claudius Gentinetta	CH 2018
2019	KIDS	Michael Frei	GB / CH 2018
2020	Little Miss Fate	Joder von Rotz	CH 2020
2021	Jeroboam	Bianca Caderas	DE 2020
2022	Manchmal weiss ich nicht wo die Sonne	Samanta Aquilino	CH 2021
2023	Pipes	Kilian Feusi, Jessica Meier, Sujanth Ravichandran	CH 2022
2024	La Perra	Carla Melo Gampert	CO / CH 2023

New Swiss Talent:

Year	Film title	Award Winner	Nationality and year
2016			
2017	Immersion	Lalita Brunner	CH 2016
2018	Travelogue Tel Aviv	Samuel Patthey	CH 2017
2019	Braises	Estelle Gatlen, Sarah Rothenberger	CH 2018
2020	The Edge	Zaide Kutay, Géraldine Cammisar	CH 2020
2021	Sauna	Anna Lena Spring, Lara Perren	CH 2021
2022	The Record	Jonathan Laskar	CH 2022
2023	Crevette	Sven Bachmann, Noémi Knobil, Jill Vágner, Elina Huber	CH 2023
2024	About a Cow	Pavla Baštanová	CZ / CH 2023

Award „Best Kids“:

Best Kids:

Year	Film title	Award Winner	Nationality and year
2009	The Incredible Story of My Great Grandmother Olive	Alberto Rodriguez	GB 2009
2010	Der präzise Peter	Martin Schmidt	DE 2010
2011	Fluffy Mc Cloud	Conor Finnegan	IE 2010
2012	Zing	Kyra Buschor, Cynthia Collings	DE 2012
2013	Hedgehogs and the City	Evalds Lacis	LV 2013
2014	Pik Pik Pik	Dmitry Vysotskiy	RU 2014
2015	Lila	Carlos Lascano	AR/ES 2014
2016	L'arbre	Lucie Sunkova	FR/CZ 2015
2017	Ethnophobia	Joan Zhonga	AL/GR 2016
2018	Fruits of Clouds	Kateřina Karhánková	CZ 2017
2019	The Bird and the Whale	Carol Freeman	IE 2018
2020	Avec le do de la cuillère	Laurent Wassouf, Clément Crosnier, Edgard Cros, Theoline Chapas, Nolwenn Pétereau, Nedellec Anouk, Lucas Ancel	FR 2019
2021	Le cri	Charlotte Chouisnard, Ninon Dodemant, Baptiste Leclerc, Solène Michel, Justine Parasote, Anouk Segura-Diaz	FR 2020
2022	LOOP	Pablo Polledri	ES 2021
2023	The Pirate and the Cello	Andreï Sokolov	RU 2023
2024	Bubbles	Lezhi Xiao	CN 2023

Children's Audience Award:

Year	Film title	Award Winner	Nationality and year
2009	The Incredible Story of My Great Grandmother Olive	Alberto Rodriguez	GB 2009
2010	Der präzise Peter	Martin Schmidt	DE 2010
2011	Fluffy Mc Cloud	Conor Finnegan	IE 2010
2012	Zing	Kyra Buschor, Cynthia Collings	DE 2012
2013	Hedgehogs and the City	Evalds Lacis	LV 2013
2014	Le vélo de l’éléphant	Olesya Shchukina	FR/BE, 2014
2015	Johnny Express	Kyungmin Woo	KR 2014
2016	Taking the Plunge	Elizabeth Ku-Herrero, Nicolas Manfredi, Marie Raoult, Thaddaeus Andreades	US 2015
2017	Ethnophobia	Joan Zhonga	AL/GR 2016
2018	Pinguin	Julia Ocker	DE 2017
2019	Elefant	Julia Ocker	DE 2018
2020	Apple Tree Man	Alla Vartanyan	RU 2020
2021	Ink	Joost van den Bosch, Erik Verkerk	NL 2020
2022	LOOP	Pablo Polledri	ES 2021
2023	The Pirate and the Cello	Andreï Sokolov	RU 2023
2024	The Swineherd	Magnus Igland Møller, Peter Smith	DK 2023

Other categories:

Badener Prize of Honor:

Year	Film title	Award Winner	Nationality and year
2015	Tik Tak	Ülo Pikkov	EE 2015
2016	Blind Vaysha	Theodore Ushev	CA 2016

A selection of the films can be watched in different Swiss cities under the name Fantoche on Tour.
