= Dancing in the Dust =

Dancing in the Dust can refer to:

- Dancing in the Dust (1988 film), a 1988 Ivorian film
- Dancing in the Dust (2003 film), a 2003 Iranian film
