= Henri Duparc =

Henri Duparc may refer to:

- Henri Duparc (composer), French music composer
- Henri Duparc (director), Ivorian film director
