= Fribourg International Film Festival =

Annual film festival held in Switzerland

- Opening film: Champions of the Golden Valley
- Location: Fribourg, Switzerland
- Founded: 1980
- Most recent: 2025
- Awards: Regard d'or
- No. of films: 108
- Festival date: Opening: 21 March 2025; Closing: 30 March 2025
- Language: French, German, English
- Website: Fribourg International Film Festival

Current: 39th
- 40th 38th

The Fribourg International Film Festival (FIFF) is an annual film festival in Fribourg, Switzerland. It is focused on selected films from Asia, Africa and Latin America. The Grand Prize is the main award of the Fribourg International Film Festival.

== The Festival ==
FIFF aims to promote the understanding between the cultures and more particularly between the so-called North and South. It gives preference to films that stimulate reflection and provoke discussion. In 1980, Magda Bossy, working for the Swiss NGO Helvetas, organized an event in honour of the 25th anniversary of the French-speaking Swiss association. Convinced that film would be an excellent medium for expressing cultural richness, the Egyptian native thinks to open the floor to filmmakers from the South. Its success – although varying city to city – calls for a second edition. In 1983, the second edition was entitled "Festival de Films du Tiers-Monde" (Third-World Film Festival). In 1992, the Festival de Films de Fribourg (the "Third-World" title is dropped in 1990) grows more professional with an artistic director Martial Knaebel working with two assistants. In autumn 1992, the Festival receives international recognition from UNESCO: the World Decade for Cultural Development seal. The ongoing evolution of the event is pronounced with the addition of "International" in the festival name in 1998. Also, the Grand Prize awarded by FIFF (Fribourg International Film Festival) becomes the Regard d’or, embodied in an original design by Fribourg sculptor Jean-Jacques Hofstetter. In 2001, the Regard d’or is awarded to Yi Yi, by Taiwanese director Edward Yang, marking one of the greatest successes for a FIFF première beyond the festival. A new artistic director, Edouard Waintrop, was named in 2007. He opened the festival to genre cinema. His successor, Thierry Jobin, put forward a redefinition of the FIFF sections: he makes the parallel sections more identifiable by using the same names that recur each year. The 29th edition breaks the record for any film festival ever held in western Switzerland with 40,000 tickets sold.

== The Selection ==
The official selection includes both a long features and a short features competitions.

== The Sections ==
=== Genre Cinema ===
2012 Western

2013 Sport Films

2014 Disaster Movies

2015 Erotic Movies

2016 Fighting Women Movies

2017 Ghost stories

=== Decryption ===
2012 Images of Islam in the Occident

2013 Abandoned children

2014 Economical crisis

2015 Can you laugh about anything?

2016 And Woman created Cinema

2017 A cinematic cabinet of curiosities

=== Diaspora ===
2012 Patrick Chappatte and Lebanon

2013 Atom Egoyan and Armenia

2014 Slava Bykov and Russia

2015 Tony Gatlif and the Roma

2016 Mira Nair and India

2017 Myret Zaki and Egypt

=== Hommage to… ===
2012 Pierre-Alain Meier, producer

2013 Martin Scorsese and the World Cinema Foundation

2014 History of Iranian Cinema by its Creators

2015 Syria, by Ossama Mohammed

2016 Ida Lupino, par Pierre Rissient

2017 Freddy Buache

=== Terra Incognita ===
2012 Bangladesh

2013 Uzbekistan

2014 Madagascar

2015 Indigenous North American cinema

2016 Being an African Female Filmmaker

2017 Nepal

=== On the Map of... ===
2012 Georges Schwizgebel

2013 Bouli Lanners

2014 Jean-Pierre & Luc Dardenne

2015 Jean-François Stévenin

2016 Geraldine Chaplin

2017 Douglas Kennedy
