= Bintou =

- Directed by: Fanta Régina Nacro
- Written by: Fanta Régina Nacro
- Produced by: Claire Lajoumard
- Starring: Hyppolite Ouangrawa; Alima Salouka
- Cinematography: Nara Keo Kosal
- Edited by: Nano Chesnais
- Music by: Yacouba Compaoré; Maï Lingani
- Distributed by: Zimmedia
- Release date: 29 January 2001 (Netherlands)
- Running time: 31 minutes
- Countries: Burkina Faso; France
- Language: More

Bintou (also known as A Close-Up on Bintou) is a 2001 Burkinabé short film directed by Fanta Régina Nacro. It formed part of the 2002 collection Mama Africa.

== Plot ==
Mother-of-three Bintou, is beaten by her husband Abel, for using housekeeping money to pay for her daughter to go to school to receive the education that she was denied in her own childhood. He believes that only his sons should be educated. Since her husband refuses to pay for a daughter to be educated, Bintou is determined to earn the money herself, however, the only skill she has is growing millet sprouts. She has to find the pots, and obtain sacks of millet from the storekeeper, while her husband continually sabotages her efforts.

== Cast ==
- Hyppolite Ouangrawa as Abel, Bintou's husband
- Alima Salouka as Bintou

== Awards ==
Bintou won several festival awards in 2001 and 2002 including at the Cannes Film Festival, Amiens International Film Festival, Bermuda International Film Festival, Clermont-Ferrand International Short Film Festival, Marrakech International Film Festival and the Ouagadougou Panafrican Film and Television Festival.
