= Romance (2011 film) =

- Film poster
- Directed by: Georges Schwizgebel
- Written by: Georges Schwizgebel
- Produced by: Georges Schwizgebel; René Chénier; Marc Bertrand
- Cinematography: Georges Schwizgebel
- Edited by: Georges Schwizgebel
- Music by: Sergei Rachmaninoff
- Production companies: National Film Board of Canada; Radio Télévision Suisse; Studio GDS
- Release date: August 8, 2011 (Locarno)
- Running time: 7 minutes
- Countries: Canada; Switzerland

Romance is a short animated film, directed by Georges Schwizgebel and released in 2011.

A co-production of the National Film Board of Canada, Radio Télévision Suisse and Schwizgebel's own Studio GDS, the film won the Genie Award for Best Animated Short at the 32nd Genie Awards.

== Plot summary ==
A man and a woman are seated next to each other on a plane, during the flight they daydream about a life together.

The animation is accompanied by the Cello Sonata Op.19 by Rachmaninoff.

== Cast ==
Cello: Tina Schwizgebel-Wang

Piano: Louis Schwizgebel-Wang

Music Recording: Yvan Bing

Sound Design: Olivier Calvert

Direction: Georges Schwizgebel
