= Un Certain Matin =

1991 Burkinese short film

- Directed by: Fanta Régina Nacro
- Written by: Fanta Régina Nacro
- Produced by: Les Films du Défi
- Starring: Abdoulaye Komboudri; Andromaque Nacro; Hyppolite Ouangrawa
- Cinematography: Catherine Sebag
- Music by: Aline Robel
- Release date: 1991
- Running time: 13 min.
- Country: Burkina Faso

Un Certain Matin (English: A Certain Morning) is a 1991 Burkinabé short film directed by Fanta Régina Nacro and produced by Les Films du Défi. It stars Abdoulaye Komboudri, Andromaque Nacro and Hyppolite Ouangrawa.

It is the first fiction film by a Burkinabé woman. The film was first screened at the 1992 Carthage Film Festival. The film received positive reviews and won several awards at international film festivals.

== Cast ==
- Abdoulaye Komboudri
- Andromaque Nacro
- Hyppolite Ouangrawa

== Awards and honours ==
- Tanit d'Or Award at Carthage Film Festival in 1992.
- Licorne d'Or Award at Amiens Film Festival in 1992.
- First Prize Air Afrique at Milan Film Festival in 1993.
