= Wend Kuuni =

- Directed by: Gaston Kaboré
- Written by: Gaston Kaboré
- Edited by: Andree Davanture
- Music by: Rene B. Guirma
- Distributed by: California Newsreel (USA)
- Release date: March 27, 1983 (USA)
- Running time: 75 minutes
- Country: Burkina Faso
- Language: Mooré

Wend Kuuni (also known as God's Gift) is a 1982 Burkinabé drama film directed by Gaston Kaboré. It was followed with the sequel Buud Yam (1997).

== Plot ==
A village leader tells a crying mother to give up hope that her husband is still alive. She runs away with her child.

The scene then changes and focuses on a traveler finding a body of a dehydrated young boy on the ground. The traveler tries to speak to the boy, but he is mute and doesn't remember a thing. He then picks him up and rides to the nearest village, which happens to be a Mossi village. The village leader comes and says that he is not from this village, but will raise him. The traveller thanks them and heads off.

When the village chiefs' search party are unable to find the boy's parents Tinga agrees to adopt him; they call him "Wend Kuuni", because destiny brought the boy to his home.

Wend Kuuni has a new job to herd the goats. He made friends with his stepsister Pougnere and is happy there.

There is a quarrel between one of the village elders (Bila) and his young wife. She accuses him of being impotent, and he calls her a witch. Tinga calms them both down and Bila later tells Tinga that the fight has been settled.

That day, Wend Kuuni accidentally left his knife in the field where the goats were grazing. When he went back that night to retrieve it, he finds Bila hanging from a tree branch. In that instant, he remembers the death of his mother after they had been chased out of the village, and he also remembers how to speak. He screams "mother!" before running back to the village to inform the others.

Wend Kuuni recounts his story to Pougnere. He recalls his sick mother being chased out of their village, and ending up under a tree in the middle of the field. When he woke up, his mother was dead. He spoke of running for hours, falling asleep, and waking up to the traveler finding him.

== Cast ==
- Serge Yanogo as Wendkouni
- Rosine Yanogo as Pognere
- Joseph Nikiema as Tinga
- Colette Kaboré as Lale
- Simone Tapsoba as Koudbila
- Yaya Wima as Bila
- Martine Ouedraogo as Timpoko
- Boucare Ouedraogo as Razougou

== Accolades ==
In 1985, Wend Kuuni won the César award for best French language film and in 1986 it won the Distribution Help Award at the Fribourg International Film Festival.

== Restoration ==
A new restoration of Wend Kuuni by the Cinémathèque royale de Belgique was screened at the Museum of Modern Art (MoMA) in New York City on January 25, 2018 as part of the 15th edition of the film preservation festival To Save and Project.
