= Au nom du Christ =

- Directed by: Roger Gnoan M'Bala
- Screenplay by: Roger Gnoan M’Bala, Jean-Marie Adiaffi, Bernin Akaffou
- Produced by: Amka Films Productions, S.A.
- Starring: Pierre Gondo, Naky Sy Savané, Akissi Delta, Felix Lago, Martin Guedeba
- Cinematography: Mohammed Soudani
- Edited by: Djangoye Amoussy
- Music by: Paul Wassaba
- Release date: 1993
- Running time: 85 min
- Country: Ivory Coast
- Language: French

Au nom du Christ (English: "In the Name of Christ") is a 1993 Ivorian film directed by Roger Gnoan M'Bala. It won the Grand Prize for Best Film at the FESPACO Film Festival and Nominated for the Golden Leopard Award at the Locarno International Film Festival in 1993.

== Synopsis ==
In this satirical drama that takes place in a village of West Africa, an untutored pig-keeper who has been thrown out of his home falls into a river and has a vision which sends him back to his people to save them for Jesus Christ, introducing himself as Magloire I, “the cousin of Christ.” A little crazy, a little robber, while some think he is a charlatan and others think he is a prodigy, he reigns as an absolute master and pushes his convictions to extremes, like being crucified. This movie recalls with humour the proliferation of pseudo-Christian sects and the outrageous acts they can convey in a continent like Africa, tossed about tradition, modernity and power.
