= The Man with No Shadow =

- French: L'Homme sans ombre
- Directed by: Georges Schwizgebel
- Written by: Georges Schwizgebel
- Based on: Peter Schlemihl by Adelbert von Chamisso
- Produced by: Georges Schwizgebel
- Music by: Judith Gruber-Stitzer
- Production companies: National Film Board of Canada; Studio GDS; RTS Radio Télévision Suisse
- Release date: May 2004
- Running time: 10 minutes
- Countries: Canada; Switzerland
- Language: No dialogue

The Man with No Shadow (French: L'Homme sans ombre) is a 2004 Canadian-Swiss animated short film written and directed by Georges Schwizgebel, based on Adelbert von Chamisso’s novella Peter Schlemihl. Told without dialogue, it follows a man who exchanges his shadow for wealth. The film won awards including the Prix Regards jeunes at Cannes Critics' Week and the Award for Outstanding Quality at the World Festival of Animated Films Zagreb, and was screened at festivals including Cannes, Locarno, Hiroshima and Vancouver.

== Synopsis ==
After making a pact with a magician, a man gives up his shadow in return for wealth. He soon learns that life without a shadow sets him apart, and after wandering far from home, he reaches Bali, where he comes to understand the value of shadows.

== Background ==
Adapted from Adelbert von Chamisso’s 1814 novella Peter Schlemihl, L'homme sans ombre is a Swiss-Canadian co-production made without dialogue using drawing on paper animation.

== Reception ==
=== Awards and nominations ===
The film won awards including the Prix Regards jeunes at Cannes Critics' Week, the Award for Outstanding Quality at the World Festival of Animated Films Zagreb, and the Prix Kodak du meilleur court métrage suisse at the Geneva International Film Festival in 2004. It was nominated for Best Animated Short at the 25th Genie Awards in 2005.

=== Critical response ===
The San Francisco Chronicle described the film as “an aching contemplation of isolation and longing”.

== Festival screenings ==
The film premiered in May 2004 and was screened that year at festivals including the 57th Cannes Film Festival, the 28th Annecy International Animation Film Festival, the 57th Locarno Film Festival, the International Animation Festival Hiroshima, the 16th World Festival of Animated Films Zagreb, and the Vancouver International Film Festival in 2004. In 2005, it was screened at festivals including the Solothurner Filmtage and the 27th Clermont-Ferrand International Short Film Festival.
