= Adrienne Koutouan =

Ivorian comedian and actress (born 1969)

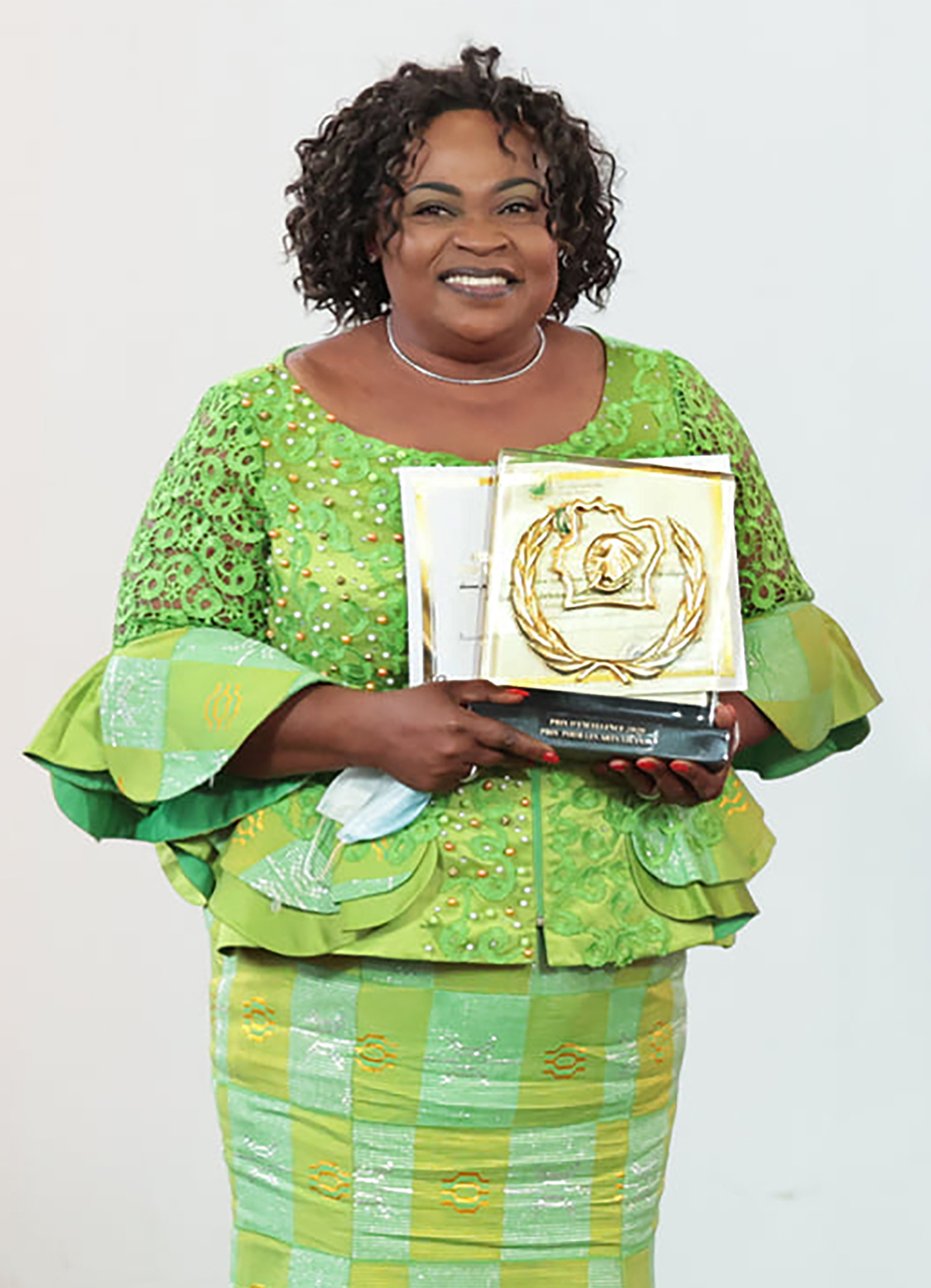
- Ivorian actress and comedian Adrienne Koutouan
- Born: Adrienne Ako Anomgbo Koutouan; 1969 (age 56–57); Abobo-Té
- Occupations: Actress, comedian
- Television: Dr. Boris

Adrienne Ako Anomgbo Koutouan (born 1969) is an Ivorian comedian and actress.

== Biography ==
Koutouan is a member of the Tchaman people and was born in the village of Abobo-Té in the municipality of Abobo near Abidjan. She wanted to become an actress from her childhood, though this idea was not warmly received by her parents. She began her career in the 1980s in the "Fétiche éburnéen" theater troupe. In 1986, Koutouan was named Best Dancer at the Ivory Coast ballet.

Koutouan has received several awards, including best female performance at the Namur Festival in Belgium in 1998, best female performance at the M-Net Festival in Johannesburg in 1999, and best African actress at the Pabbah festival in Nigeria in 2002. In 2006, Koutouan received the Gold Standard award at the Panafrican Film and Television Festival of Ouagadougou for her performance in the series Quand les éléphants se battent. She is well known in the Ivory Coast for her role as Rosalie in the series Faut pas fâcher. In 2008, Koutouan starred as Infirmière Antoinette in Dr. Boris alongside Ahmed Souaney.

On April 14, 2019, Koutouan was honored in a ceremony for her 30th year as an actress, receiving several distinctions from the government. She achieved the rank of officer in the Order of Cultural Merit, by the Ministry of Culture and Francophonie. A devout Catholic, Koutouan also had a mass in her honor.

== Partial filmography ==
- 1993: Faut pas fâcher (TV Series)
- 1994: Wariko, le gros lot as Curious Neighbour
- 1998: Lucy's Revenge as Albertine
- 2000: Je m'appelle Fargass
- 2005: Quand les éléphants se battent (TV Series)
- 2005: Caramel as Maria
- 2007: Danger permanent
- 2008: Dr. Boris (TV Series) as Infirmière Antoinette
