= Mamadou Djim Kola =

Burkinabe filmmaker (b. 1940, d. 2004)

- Born: 27 January 1940; Ouagadougou, Africa
- Died: 11 December 2004 (aged 64); Ouagadougou, Africa
- Occupations: Director, producer
- Notable work: Le conflit (The Dispute)

Mamadou Djim Kola (27 January 1940 – 11 December 2004) was a Burkinabe filmmaker who directed feature films and short films.

== Early life ==
Mamadou Djim Kola was born in Dapyoa, Ouagadougou. His father was a fan of cinema and owned a projector that he used to show films to the local neighbourhood.

He attended elementary school at the Ouagadougou Center School (1947 to 1955) before graduating as a teacher from the 'Cours Antoine Roche de Ouahigouya' school (1955–1959).

== Career ==
After graduating as a teacher Kola felt the pull of cinema and enrolled in a correspondence course with the Independent Center of French Cinema (Conservatoire Indépendant du Cinéma Français, CICF) in 1961. This was in spite of social pressure that teachers were more important to Burkina Faso than film directors.

Le Sang Des Parias (1972) was the first feature film produced in Burkina Faso. After the nationalisation of cinemas in 1969 government money was available and the film was state funded.

It was screened the following year at the festival of the Panafrican Film and Television Festival of Ouagadougou (Festival panafricain du cinéma et de la télévision de Ouagadougou, FESPACO). The festival helped create a cinema community in sub-Saharan Africa and was the site from which many African cinematic influences emerged. It won the Jury Prize and Burkinabe cinema was launched.

From 1976 to 1979 he worked as technical director of the Inter-African Film Production Center (CIPROFILM, Centre interafricain de production des films). From 1980 to 1989 he joined their Consortium interafricain de distribution cinématografique (CIDC-CIPROFILM).

From 1990 until his retirement in 1993, he worked at the Ministry of Information and Culture.

Djim Kola was well regarded in Burkina Faso and was affectionately known as the 'Dean' by his associates. His funeral was well attended by dignitaries including the head of culture at the time, Mahamoudou Ouedraogo.

In 2000 he was decorated Knight of the Order of Merit of Arts and Letters. This was in light of his cinematic achievements and his fight against caste discrimination and xenophobia which are evident in his films.

== Filmography ==
Year	Title	Credited as			Notes
Year	Title	Director	Writer	Producer	Notes
1972	Le conflit (The Dispute)	Yes	No	No	Short Film
1973	Le sang des parias (Blood of the Pariahs)	Yes	No	No	Feature Film
1976	Cissin... cinq ans plus tard (Cissin... five years later)	Yes	No	No	Short Film
1992	Kognini y Toungan/les etrangers (The Foreigners)	Yes	No	No	Short Film

== Accolades ==
Year	Award	Category	Title	Result
1973	FESPACO Film Festival	Jury Prize	Le Sang Des Parias	Won
