= Vanessa Koutouan =

Ivorian women's rights activist

- Born: 1988 (age 37–38); Abidjan, Côte d'Ivoire
- Citizenship: Ivory Coast
- Education: Université Félix Houphouët-Boigny
- Occupation: women's rights activist

Vanessa Koutouan (born 1988) is an Ivorian women's rights activist. She is the director of the Rural Center Ilomba, an educational initiative in the Bingerville area of the Ivory Coast that promotes the education of girls.

== Early life ==
Vanessa Koutouanwas born in Abidjan, the capital of the Ivory Coast, the youngest of seven siblings, and the daughter of deeply Christian parents.

Koutouan earned a bachelor's degree from the Institute of Sciences and Techniques of Communication at the Université Félix Houphouët-Boigny in Abidjan, followed by a master's degree in hotel management and pedagogy in Italy.

== Career ==
She is the director of the Rural Center Ilomba, an educational initiative in the Bingerville area of the Ivory Coast that promotes the education of girls because families in this country used to priorize the education of boys over girls.

Alvaro del Portillo encouraged local communities to create a dispensary in 1989. About 100 women at any one time are educated there, with an emphasis on vocational training and literacy, and they provide health education in rural areas, especially for women.

In 2015, the dispensary had one doctor, two nurses and one midwife to care for 700 patients par week. There was also a secondary school and the continuing education unit providing training for young people without financial means.

Vanessa Koutouan believes that poverty in the Ivory Coast could be eradicated within a few years if young girls were given the opportunity to study and did not have to work in the fields all their lives. She denounces the situation of women in the rural area of the Ivory Coast, where there is extreme poverty and analphabetism, difficulty to sustain oneself with sufficient food, early motherhood and AIDS because of the lack of hygiene and food.

== Awards ==
On 3 March 2015, Koutouan received the annual Harambee "African Woman" in a ceremony in Madrid, "for the promotion and equality of African women".
