= Louis Schwizgebel =

Swiss pianist (born 1987)

Louis Schwizgebel (born 19 November 1987) is a Swiss pianist. He studied piano with Franz Josefovski and Brigitte Meyer at the Lausanne Conservatory, Pascal Devoyon at Universität der Künste Berlin, Emanuel Ax and Robert McDonald at the Juilliard School, and Pascal Nemirovski at the Royal Academy of Music. He won second prize at the Leeds International Piano Competition.

== Career ==
Schwizgebel has been the recipient of a number of prizes and scholarships, including second prize at the 2005 Concours de Genève, First Prize at the 2007 Young Concert Artists European Auditions in Leipzig and the Young Concert Artists International Auditions in New York, and 2nd prize at the 2012 Leeds International Piano Competition. He received a scholarship from Mozart-Gesellschaft Dortmund in 2013-2014, and was a BBC Radio 3 New Generation Artist in 2013-2015.

== Personal life ==
Born in Geneva, Louis Schwizgebel is the son of Chinese mother Yaping Wang and father Georges Schwizgebel, a Swiss animated film director. He lives in London. He enjoys performing magic, and making complex origami.

On 27 July 2018, Schwizgebel married Justine Kolata in Buckingham, England.

== Discography ==
- 2006: Piano Concerto No. 2 of Mendelssohn, with the Orchestre de Chambre de Genève directed by Paul Goodwin; label Pan-Classics.
- 2013: Solo Album "Poems"; label Little Tribeca, EAN 3149028040920
- 2013: Brahms Cello Sonatas + Clarinet Trio with cellist Ophélie Gaillard and clarinetist Fabio Di Càsola; label Aparté
- 2014: Beethoven: Piano Concertos 1 & 2, London Philharmonic Orchestra, cond. Thierry Fischer; label Little Tribeca, EAN 3149028051124
- 2015: Saint-Saëns: piano concertos n°2 & n°5, BBC Symphony Orchestra, cond. Martyn Brabbins & Fabien Gabel; label Aparté
- 2016: Schubert: Piano Sonatas Nos. 19, D958 and 16, D845; label Little Tribeca, EAN 3149028098327
