= Kamran Shirdel =

Iranian filmmaker

- کامران شیردل
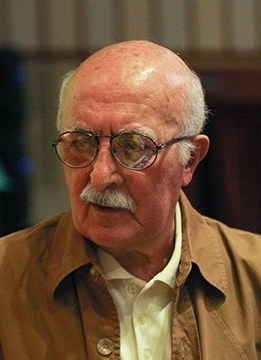
- Born: 21 June 1939 (age 87); Tehran, Iran
- Education: Sapienza University of Rome
- Occupations: Film director, documentarist, translator
- Years active: 1973–present
- Awards: Kraków Film Festival (1981); Order of Merit of the Italian Republic (2010)

Kamran Shirdel (Persian: کامران شیردل; born 21 June 1939) is an Iranian filmmaker and documentarist.

== Biography ==
Kamran Shirdel was born on 21 June 1939 in Tehran. He studied architecture and urbanism at the University of Rome (now Sapienza University of Rome) and film direction at the Centro Sperimentale di Cinematografia of Rome, graduating in 1964. He worked as an assistant director with John Huston on The Bible before making his diploma film, Gli Specchi (The Mirrors), in Rome. He returned to Iran and started his film career in 1965.

Since January 2000, Shirdel is the founder and director of the Kish International Documentary Film Festival which is held annually in the January in Kish Island in the Persian Gulf. He is also the managing director of Filmgrafic Co. Kamran Shirdel was appointed as Il cavaliere Della Republica Italiana and received the Medals of La stella della solidarieta italiana in a ceremony held in Farmanieh Palace in Tehran in May 2010.

== Filmography ==
- Nedamatgah (aka Women's Prison)1965 / 11 min. / Black & white / shot in 35 mm.
- Qal'eh (aka Women's Quarter, it depicts the life condition of prostitutes in Tehran's red-light district during the mid-sixties)1965 - 1980 / 18 min. / Black & White / Shot in 35 mm.
- Tehran is the Capital of Iran 1966 - 1980 / 18 min. / Black & White / Shot in 35 mm.
- The Night It Rained (aka Oun Shab Keh Baroun Oumad, an Award-winning satirical documentary)1967 - 1974 / 35 min./Black & White / shot in 35 mm.
- The Morning of the Fourth Day (Sobh-e Rooz-e Chaahaarom) (Feature film, fiction,1972)
- Dubai (1974)1974-75 / 38 min. / color / shot in 35 mm.
- Solitude Opus 1 (2002)18 min. / color / shot in Betacam SP.

Every year, the IDFA, International Documentary Festival in Amsterdam, gives an acclaimed filmmaker the chance to screen his or her personal Top 10 favorite films. In 2007, filmmaker Maziar Bahari selected Kamran Shirdel's The Night It Rained for his top ten classics from the history of documentary.
