= Dancing in the Dust (1988 film) =

1989 film by Henri Duparc

- Directed by: Henri Duparc
- Starring: Bamba Bakary; Hanny Tchelly; Thérèse Taba; Anne Kabou.
- Release date: 1988

Dancing in the Dust or Ball in the Dust (original title Bal Poussière) is a 1988 Ivorian comedy film dealing with the theme of polygyny. It was directed by Henri Duparc and starred actors Bamba Bakary, Hanny Tchelly, Naky Sy Savané, Thérèse Taba, and Anne Kabou. In July 2021, the film was shown in the Cannes Classics section at the 2021 Cannes Film Festival.

== Synopsis ==
Demi-Dieu (Demigod) is a wealthy farmer and village head with five wives. When he decides to marry a sixth, young Binta, to have one for each day of the week (apart from Sunday, the day of rest), his five wives become discontent. Binta, a modern, self-confident woman, doesn't want to be kept in line. Soon there is conflict with her husband as well as with the other five wives, creating comic relief.

== See also ==
- Henri Duparc
- Naky Sy Savané
