= Night of Truth =

2004 Burkinabé film by Fanta Régina Nacro

- Directed by: Fanta Régina Nacro
- Written by: Marc Gautron; Fanta Régina Nacro
- Produced by: Claire Lajoumard; Fanta Régina Nacro
- Starring: Moussa Cissé; Adama Ouédraogo; Naky Sy Savané
- Cinematography: Nara Keo Kosal
- Edited by: Andreé Davanture
- Music by: Sami Rama; Troupe Naba Yaadega
- Distributed by: Acrobates Films; Global Film Initiative
- Release dates: September 16, 2004 (Toronto International Film Festival); July 6, 2006 (France)
- Running time: 100 minutes
- Countries: Burkina Faso; France
- Languages: Dioula; French

Night of Truth (French: La nuit de la vérité) is a 2004 French/Burkinabe film, the first full-length film by director Fanta Régina Nacro. Set in a fictional West-African country, this film tells the story of the night of reconciliation between two ethnic groups, the Nayak and the Bonandés. After ten years of war and much bloodshed, Théo, leader of the Bonandés, invites the Nayak president to come and make peace. However, things do not go as smoothly as planned. The film is in French and Dioula.
