= Buud Yam =

- Directed by: Gaston Kaboré
- Written by: Gaston Kaboré
- Produced by: Gaston Kaboré
- Starring: Serge Yanogo
- Cinematography: Jean-Noël Ferragut
- Edited by: Marie-Jeanne Kanyala; Didier Ranz
- Music by: Michel Portal
- Distributed by: Africa Film Library
- Release date: September 10, 1997 (France)
- Running time: 97 minutes
- Country: Burkina Faso
- Language: More

Buud Yam is a 1997 Burkinabé historical drama film written and directed by Gaston Kaboré. It is the sequel to the film Wend Kuuni. As of 2001, it was the most popular African film ever in Burkina Faso.

The title's meaning is unclear: buud can mean both "ancestors" and "descendants", while yam means "spirit" or "intelligence." It has been translated as Soul of the Group.

== Plot ==
The film draws on the African oral tradition. Set in a nineteenth century village, it follows a group of characters from Kaboré's debut film Wend Kuuni. Wend Kuuni (Serge Yanogo) is a young man who is suspected of being responsible, through the use of sorcery, for his adopted sister's ill health. To help his sister, and clear his name, he tries to find a healer who uses the legendary "lion's herbs". He also searches for his own roots.

== Distribution and awards ==
In 1997, Buud Yam was shown at the Cannes Film Festival during Directors Fortnight and had its North American premiere at the Toronto International Film Festival. It won the Etalon de Yennega (the Grand Prize) at the 15th Ouagadougou Panafrican Film and Television Festival.

== Cast ==
- Colette Kaboré as Lalle
- Amssatou Maïga as Pughneere
- Sévérine Oueddouda as Komkeita
- Boureima Ouedraogo as Razugu
- Augustine Yameogo as Aunt
- Serge Yanogo as Wend Kuuni

== Critical reception ==
Critic Deborah Young of Variety wrote a glowing review praising the film's direction, music and cinematography by stating "Kabore is a masterful raconteur able to hold the viewer’s attention... He tells his story in exceptionally clear, simple images that are restful to look at, aided by Jean-Noel Ferragut’s sharp-edged cinematography. Composer Michel Portal adds an unexpected modern note to the timeless story through his musical commentary, combining native instruments with a soft jazz sound."
