= Dr. Boris =

- Docteur Boris
- Genre: Sitcom
- Created by: Agence INITIATIV & Michael Konan Mikayo
- Country of origin: Ivory Coast
- No. of seasons: 1
- No. of episodes: 52

Production
- Producer: Agence INITIATIV
- Running time: 25 minutes

Dr. Boris is an Ivorian sitcom created by Michael Konan Mikayo that has been broadcast since 2008. It is also broadcast in Togo, Senegal, Mali, Burkina Faso, and Benin.
