= Gaston Kaboré =

Burkinabé film director

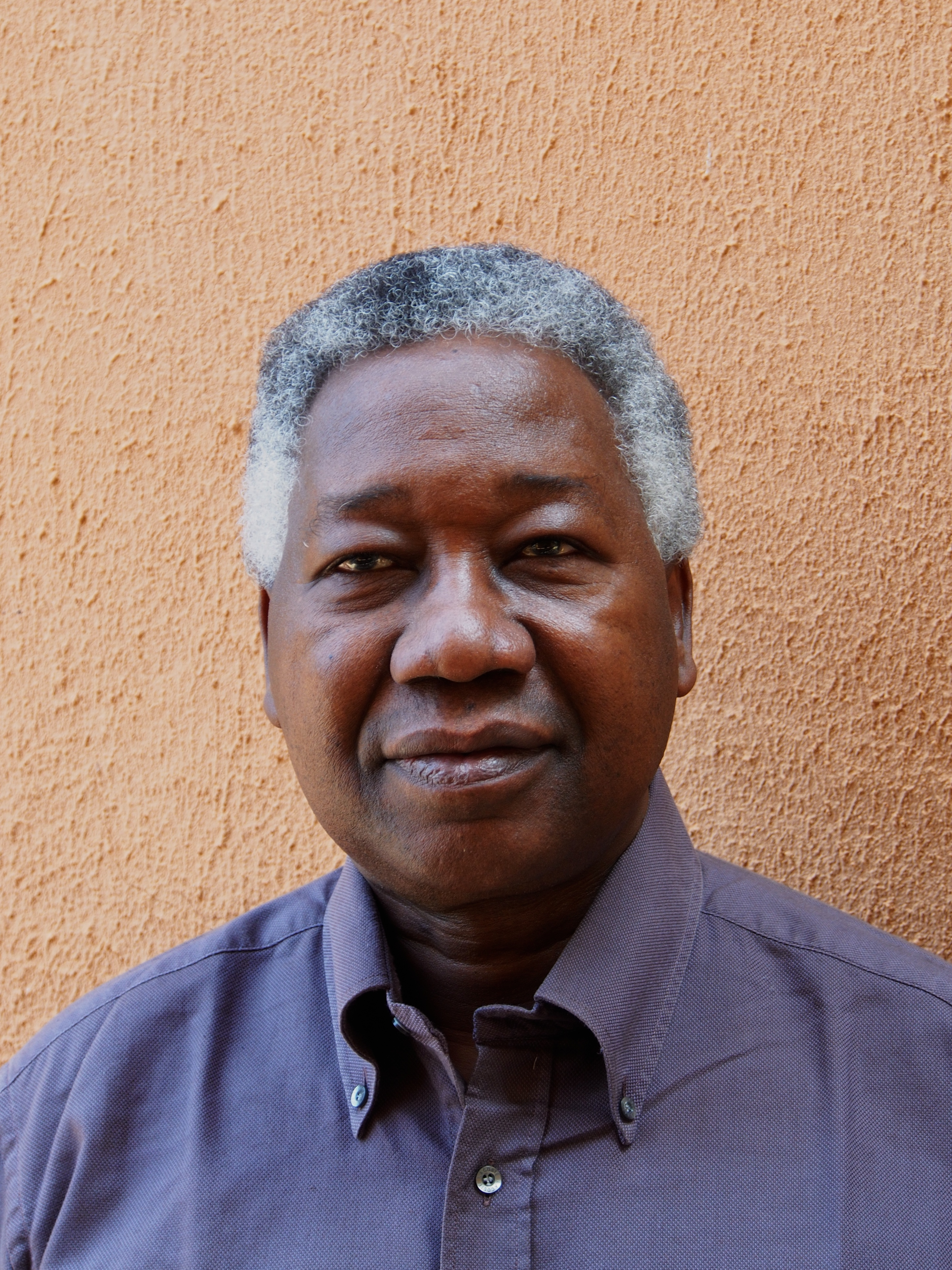
- Born: April 23, 1951 (age 75); Bobo-Dioulasso
- Citizenship: Burkinabé
- Education: Sorbonne, France
- Occupation: film director

Gaston Kaboré (born 1951) is a Burkinabé film director and an important figure in Burkina Faso's film industry. He has won awards for his films Wend Kuuni and Buud Yam. He is the founder of Imagine Institute, a school he opened in Ouagadougou, Burkina Faso in 2003, that provides workshops and residencies for film and television professionals.

== Biography ==
Kaboré was born in 1951 in Bobo-Dioulasso in Upper Volta.

He studied history at the Sorbonne in Paris, France, receiving his license and Maîtrise (Master's) degrees. While researching the history of racial prejudice against Africa by its colonisers for his Maîtrise, Kaboré was drawn to contemporary documentary films which, he felt, continued to propagate such stereotypes. To better understand the "language of cinema", he decided to go to ESEC film school. Originally intending to use film as a medium for disseminating historical knowledge, he gradually grew passionate about film for its own sake. He received his degree in Film Production in 1976. He returned to his native country to be director of the Centre National du Cinéma. His film Wend Kuuni was only the second feature film produced in Burkina Faso. His work for the screen, focusing on his country's rural heritage, has received numerous international awards, including a French César award.

In 1997 he won the first prize at the 15th Panafrican Film and Television Festival of Ouagadougou (FESPACO) with the film Buud Yam.

From 1985 to 1997 he was the Secretary-General of the Pan African Federation of Filmmakers (FEPACI). In 2003 he opened Imagine Institute, a school in Ouagadougou that provides training for television and film professionals. Kabore created the school to address the lack of African training schools and in the belief that “cinema is able to play a fundamental role of the restoration of [African] self-confidence, self-esteem.”

== Filmography ==
- Wend Kuuni (1983)
- Zan Boko (1988)
- Rabi (1992)
- Lumière and Company (1995)
- Buud Yam (1997)
