= Henri Duparc (director) =

Ivorian film director

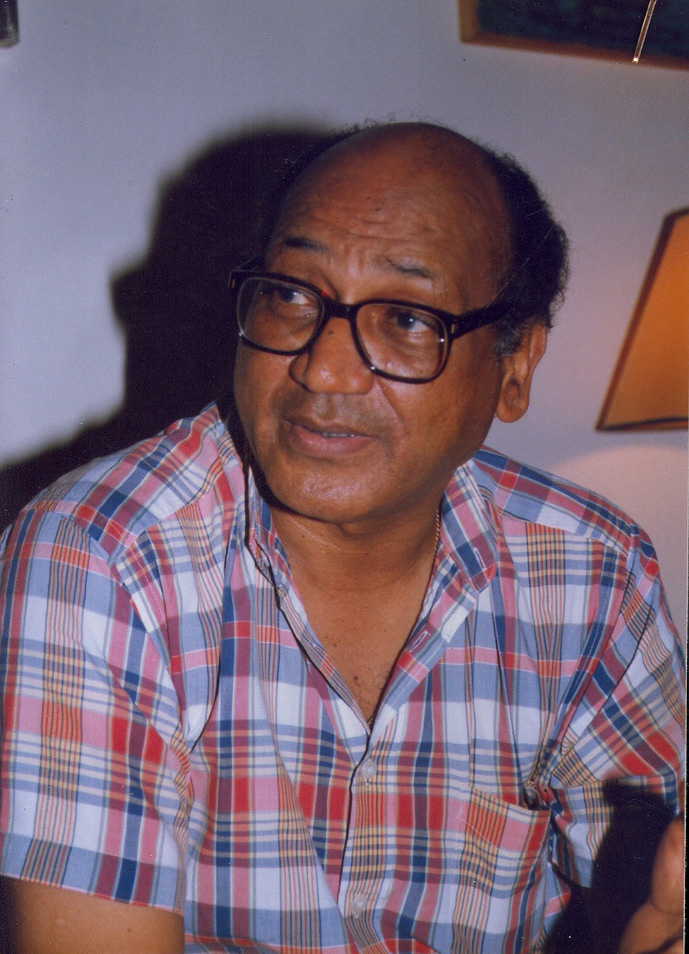
- Born: Henri Duparc; 23 December 1941; Forécariah
- Died: April 18, 2006 (aged 64); Paris, France
- Citizenship: Ivorian
- Occupations: Film director; Writer
- Known for: Mouna, le rêve d'un artiste, The Family (original title Abusuan) Les racines de la vie (short), Wild Grass, Aya, I've chosen life, Joli Cœur
- Notable work: Caramel

Henri Duparc (December 23, 1941, in Forécariah – April 18, 2006, in Paris) was an Ivorian film director and writer. He produced and wrote the 2004 film Caramel.

== Filmography ==
- 1969: Mouna, le rêve d'un artiste
- 1972: The Family (original title Abusuan) – It won special mention in Panafrican Film and Television Festival of Ouagadougou in 1973.
- 1973: Les racines de la vie (short)
- 1977: Wild Grass – L'Herbe sauvage
- 1986: Aya
- 1987: I've chosen life – (original title J'ai choisi de vivre)
- 1988: Dancing in the Dust with Bakary Bamba, Naky Sy Savane
- 1990: Le Sixième doigt with Patrick Chesnais, Jean Carmet, Bakary Bamba, Naky Sy Savane
- 1992: Joli Cœur
- 1994: Rue Princesse with Félicité Wouassi
- 1997: Une couleur café
- 2004: Caramel

=== As an actor ===
1968 : Concerto for an Exile – (original title: Concerto pour un exil)
