= Fanta Régina Nacro =

Burkinabé film director (born 1962)

Fanta Regina Nacro
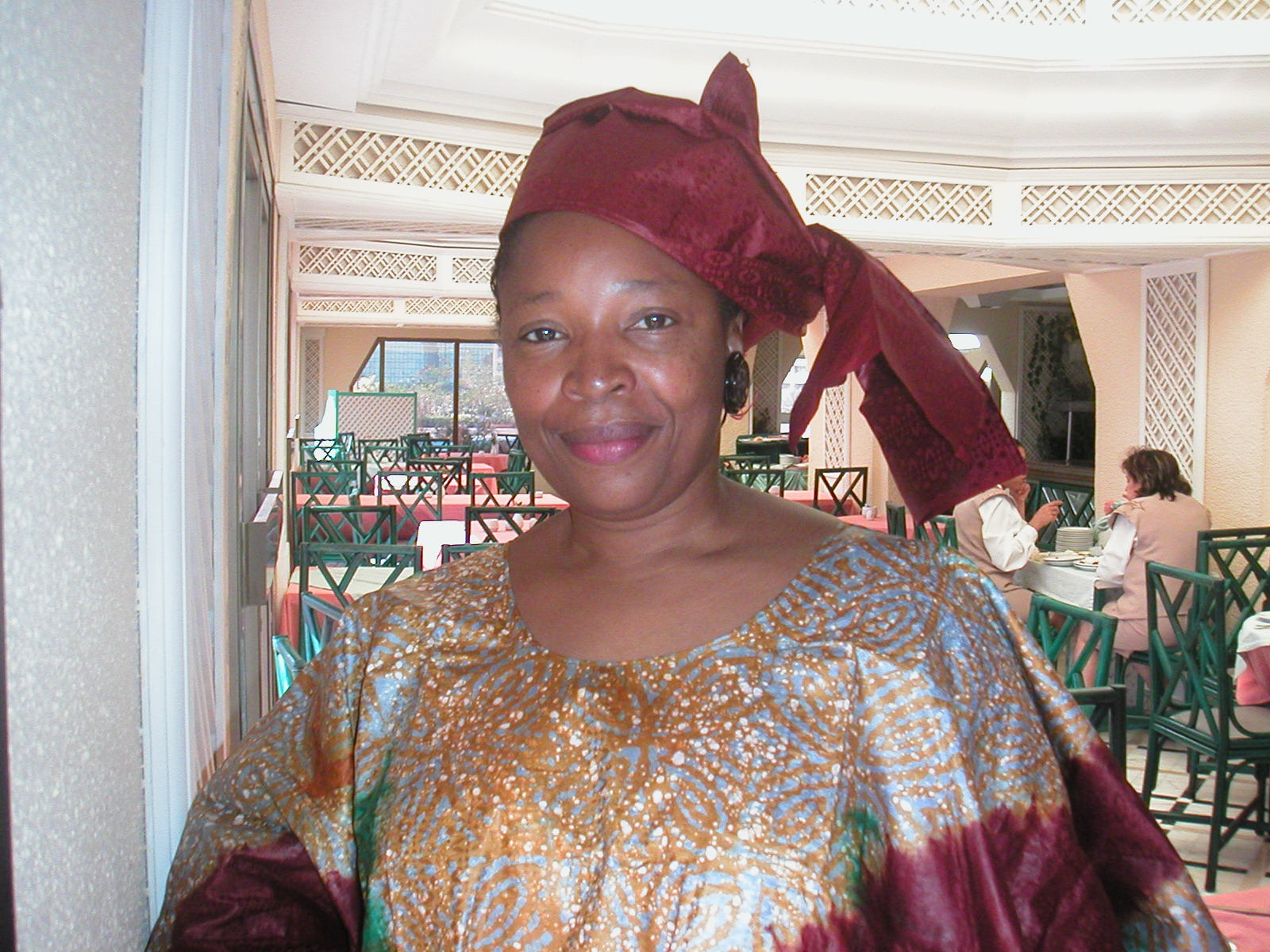
- Born: 4 September 1962 (age 64)
- Education: Filmmaking, editing and cinematography
- Known for: La Nuit de la Vérité (Night of Truth) and Un Matin (Some Morning)

Fanta Regina Nacro (born 4 September 1962) is well known for being the first woman from Burkina Faso to direct a feature film and is a founding member of the Guilde Africaine des Realisateurs et Producteurs (The African Guild of Directors and Producers). She is an artist who explores the themes of African cinema while tackling issues surrounding illness such as AIDS, and education for the girl child. She represents the "New African Wave". Nacro's films tend to question the traditions of Burkina Faso, while looking at the relationship between tradition and modernity in today's world.

== Early life and education ==
Nacro grew up in rural Burkina Faso with the intention of becoming a midwife. The desire for film making came from her upbringing around storytelling in Burkina Faso. Her interest towards working in the film industry began to grow. She credits a neighbour for informing her about the film school, Institut d'Education Cinématographique de Ouagadougou (INAFEC), in Burkina Faso. While studying at INAFEC, Nacro met Idrissa Ouedraogo, a director for whom she would later work for as an editor. She received her first degree in audiovisual science and techniques from INAFEC in 1986.

She also earned a master's degree in Film and Audiovisual Studies at the Sorbonne.

== Career ==
Her first work in cinematography came during a collaboration during her studies at INAFEC. Her film department had partnered with the film department at Howard University led by Professor Abiyi Ford. Nacro credits this collective project, in which she met filmmaker Zeinabu Davis, as her "first cinematographic experience. It was very important for me and allowed me to define my role in this profession," (p. 216). She has since stated that although future collaborative projects between African directors and African American directors would be valuable, finding funding would be a key challenge.

Noting that during her education, Nacro had to learn all the different facets of filmmaking, including editing and cinematography, these skills are what helped her start her career in the film industry. Beginning as a television announcer, and then working in continuity and editing, Nacro soon started working as a director and made her first film, Un Certain Matin (1991).

In 1999, Nacro, along with Jean-Marie Teno and Balufu Bakupa-Kanyinda, created the Guilde Africaine des Realisateurs et Producteurs (The African Guild of Directors and Producers) to expand the work of African filmmakers. The initiative has worked to bring more attention to African Cinema in an effort to support the industry.

She is popularly known for producing short films around Europe, Africa and North America.

=== Film ===
Nacro's first film was a short called Un Certain Matin (1992). Since then she has produced a number of short films, often taking a humorous perspective on the traditions of her country and the complexity of relations between tradition and modernity. Bintou has won over twenty prizes in international festivals and won the Fespaco prize for best short film in 2001.

I believe in exchanging ideas, in cultural exchange. We watch European films. We make allowances, retain what is positive in Western culture and reject the negative, so I don't see why Western audiences shouldn't see African images. Furthermore, the more Western audiences see African films, the more racist preconceptions will be challenged because the more you know someone, the better you understand his or her aspirations and behaviour. I believe that film can help to establish real exchange and communication between different nations, as film is the best means of educating the masses.

— Fanta Nacro, quoted in Africa Shoots Back: Alternative Perspectives in Sub-Saharan Francophone African Film

==== Puk Nini ====
Puk Nini, which means "open your eyes", is a short film in which Nacro plays with the theme of adultery both from the viewpoint of males and females. It features three main characters: Isa, Salif and Astou. Isa and Salif are married, however since their marriage and the birth of their daughter, Salif has grown jealous over Isa's attention towards their child. Astou is a sexually liberated character who begins an affair with Salif, once he has decided to look elsewhere for sexual attention. Although she is first shown to the audience from the male point of view, Nacro soon reverses this objectifying gaze on to Salif and drives the sexual narrative. Once Isa discover's Salif's extramarital activities, she joins sides with Astou, and together they unite against Salif. Their partnership demonstrates the importance of solidarity among women as opposed to competing for male attention. Nacro's film encourages female independence and defies many of the traditional power structures that exist between men and women, both in the African and Hollywood contexts.

Nacro has stated that her ideas surrounding the problems of extramarital affairs in Puk Nini came from her male colleagues at Institut d'Education Cinématographique de Ouagadougou (INAFEC). "Because no matter what we say about African life today, there is a crisis among couples that is alarming. It is necessary, at least for me, to think about the relationship between men and women."

==== Le Truc de Konaté ====
This short film directed by Nacro in 1997 depicts the various myths behind condom use, sexuality, AIDS, polygamy and the theme of change in a Burkinabe village. Konaté, the lead character, is married to three wives and is known to have mistresses. One of his wives, Diénéba, becomes informed about the implications of the AIDS virus after a visit to town one day. Her experience in town teaches her about the importance of condoms, which she communicates to Konaté. Konaté insists to Diénéba that he should not wear a condom, a stance that is later supported by the other men in the village. Unable to conduct a physical relationship with Diénéba or his other wives, he attempts to have intercourse with his mistress. When it seems as though he has been afflicted with impotency, he journeys to town in hopes of curing this issue. He learns from a religious visualizer that the only cure is to find a special tree. Once in town, an AIDS campaigner helps him to find the tree as long as Konaté promises to start wearing condoms. Konaté successfully finds the tree, is cured and returns home.

Nacro exhibits the theme of change through a journey that both Konaté and Diénéba must take in order to learn about the issues surrounding the AIDs virus. The film works with both humorous and informative elements, as it includes important information regarding sexual protection, but also the importance of female empowerment in a romantic relationship, especially as it pertains to health.

Nacro made her first full-length film, Night of Truth (La Nuit de la Vérité), in 2004.

== Attitudes towards filmmaking ==
Nacro has said that improving the reach of African cinema will be a continual goal among African directors. She has noted that improving audience numbers is a necessity for the industry to grow, as the film industry has not yet reached its potential in many African countries. "Ever since I saw a film called Femme d'Alger, which was made by a man, with what one may even call a woman's sensibility, I've come to realize that there is really no woman's or man's sensibility, but there is simply a human sensibility."

== Filmography ==
FILM	DATE	RUNNING TIME
Un Certain Matin	1991	15 Minutes
L'Ecole au coeur de la vie	1993	13 Minutes
Puk Nini	1995	32 Minutes
Femmes capables	1997	23 Minutes
La Tortue du Monde	1997	23 Minutes
Le Truc de Konate	1998	33 Minutes
Florence Barrigha	1999	26 Minutes
Relou	2000	5 Minutes
Laafi Bala	2000	26 Minutes
La Bague au doigt	2001	5 Minutes
Une Volonte de Fer	2001	5 Minutes
La Voix de la raison	2001	5 Minutes
Bintou	2001	31 Minutes
En parler ca aide	2002	17 Minutes
Vivre positivement	2003	42 Minutes
La Nuit de la Vérité (Night of Truth)	2004	100 Minutes

== Awards and honours ==
- In 1992, Nacro received the Tanit d'Or for short film Un Certain Matin at Carthage
- In 1992, Nacro received the Licorne d'Or for short film Un Certain Matin at Amiens
- In 1993, Nacro received the First Prize Air Afrique for short film Un Certain Matin at Milan
- In 1997, Nacro received nomination for Puk Nini at FESPACO
