= Georges Schwizgebel =

Swiss animation film director (born 1944)

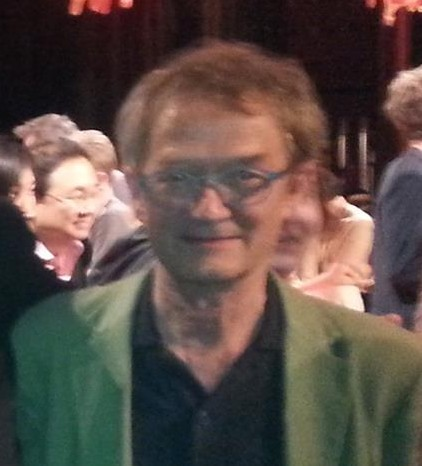
Schwizgebel in 2017

Georges Schwizgebel (born 28 September 1944) is a Swiss animation film director whose paint-on-glass-animated 2004 film The Man with No Shadow (L'Homme sans ombre) won various awards.

== Biography ==
Schwizgebel was born on 28 September 1944 in Reconvilier, Canton of Bern (Bernese Jura), in the French-speaking part of Switzerland. From 1960-65 he studied at the École des Beaux-Arts et des Arts Décoratifs at Geneva. In 1970 he founded Studio GDS with Claude Luyet et Daniel Suter, where he produced and directed animated films as well as working in graphic design. From 1986 to 1995 he worked on retrospectives and exhibitions, among others, in Nuremberg, Stuttgart, Tokyo, Osaka, Paris and New York.

In 2012, the artist donated some drawings on paper, paintings on cellulose (the customary technique of Schwizgebel) and pastels to the Swiss Film Archive, thus constituting the Georges Schwizgebel Papers.

== Accolades ==
He received the Swiss Film Prize twice: in 2002, for La jeune fille et les nuages, and in 2016, for Erlking. His film The Man With No Shadow was included in the Animation Show of Shows. His 2011 short film Romance, a co-production of the National Film Board of Canada and two Swiss studios, won the Award for Best Animated Short at the 32nd Genie Awards.

He is the recipient the 2015 Prix Culture et Société of the City of Geneva and of the Prix d’honneur of Swiss Film Award 2018.

In 2017, the Annecy International Animation Film Festival awarded him a Cristal d'honneur for his entire career.

== In popular culture ==
A recreation of a still from Schwizgebel's 1982 short film Le ravissement de Frank N. Stein by Robert Beatty is featured on the front cover of Oneohtrix Point Never's 2013 album R Plus Seven, recreated with permission from the artist. In the video for his 2020 single, "Long Road Home", Oneohtrix Point Never once again pays homage to Le ravissement de Frank N. Stein. A still image of the film was also uploaded to Instagram by musician Kanye West in 2021.

== Personal life ==
Schwizgebel lives in Geneva, is married and has two children. His son is classical pianist Louis Schwizgebel-Wang (b. 1987).

== Selected filmography ==
- Le vol d’Icare (1974)
- Perspectives (1975)
- Hors-jeu (1977)
- Le ravissement de Frank N. Stein (1982)
- 78 Tours (1985)
- Nakounine (1986)
- Le sujet du tableau (1989)
- La course à l'abîme (Ride to the Abyss) (1992)
- L’année du daim (1995)
- ZigZag (1996)
- Fugue (1998)
- La jeune fille et les nuages (2000)
- The Man with No Shadow (2004)
- Jeu (2006)
- Retouches (2008)
- Romance (2011)
- Chemin Faisant (2012)
- Erlkönig / Le roi des aulnes (2015)
- La bataille de San Romano (2017)
