= Cheik Doukouré =

Guinean filmmaker

- Born: Cheik Doukouré; 1943 (age 82–83); Kankan, Guinea
- Education: Sorbonne University
- Occupations: Director, actor, screenwriter, film producer
- Years active: 1972–present

Cheik Doukouré (born 1943) is a Guinean filmmaker. He is notable as the director of critically acclaimed film Le Ballon d'Or (The Golden Ball). Besides film director, Doukouré is also actor, screenwriter and film producer.

== Education ==
He was born in 1943 in Kankan, Guinea and had primary education in Conakry. In 1964, he left Guinea and moved to Paris, France. He completed the degree of modern literature at the Sorbonne University in 1964, in modern letters and was educated at the theatre schools Cours Simon, and later at the Conservatory of rue Blanche (École nationale supérieure des arts et techniques du théâtre, ENSATT) in 1965.

== Career ==
In France, he started out as an actor in the theater and on television. In 1978 Doukouré wrote the screenplay Bako, l'autre rive (Bako, the Other Shore) and later the popular play Black Mic-Mac (1986).

As an actor, he played notable parts in a number of films, including in My New Partner (Les Ripoux, 1981) and in the critically acclaimed 1994 film Un indien dans la ville (Little Indian, Big City). In 1991, Doukouré made his directorial debut with the drama feature film Blanc d'ébène (Ebony White) which takes place in Guinea during the Second World War. In 1993, he founded in Guinea his production company Bako Productions. Later that year, he produced his second feature film Le Ballon d'Or (The Golden Ball), which focuses on an African peasant who became a football star.

In 2001, Doukouré founded the production company Les Films de l'Alliance with his co-writer Danielle Ryan to realise his self-directed film Paris selon Moussa (Paris according to Moussa), in which he also starred. In 2003, he won the Prize for male interpretation at the 18th edition of Panafrican Film and Television Festival of Ouagadougou (FESPACO) for his role in Paris selon Moussa on the position of undocumented African immigrants in Paris.

== Filmography ==
Doukouré's filmography includes:

| Year | Film | Role | Genre |
|---|---|---|---|
| 1972 | Chut! by Jean-Pierre Mocky | Actor | Film |
| 1972 | Elle cause plus... elle flingue by Michel Audiard | Actor: Un habitant du bidonville | Film |
| 1973 | A Rare Bird (L'Oiseau rare) by Jean-Claude Brialy | Actor | Film |
| 1974 | Chinese in Paris (Les Chinois à Paris) by Jean Yanne | Actor: Un dignitaire africain | Film |
| 1975 | The Man Without a Face (L'Homme sans visage) | Actor: Le travailleur noir | TV mini series |
| 1975 | Les compagnons d'Eleusis | Actor: Oudhir | TV series |
| 1978 | The Savage State (L'état sauvage) by Francis Girod | Actor: Minister of Children's Affairs | Film |
| 1978 | Bako, the Other Shore (Bako, l'autre rive) by Jacques Champreux | Actor: Camara Lamine, Writer | Film |
| 1979 | Le Maître-nageur by Jean-Louis Trintignant | Actor: Le Noir | Film |
| 1980 | Les 400 coups de Virginie | Actor: Un terrassier | TV mini series |
| 1980 | Operation Leopard | Actor | Film |
| 1980 | Les mystères de Paris | Actor: Le médecin | TV series |
| 1981 | Un dessert pour Constance | Actor: Mamadou | TV series |
| 1981 | The Professional by Georges Lautner | Actor: Le docteur infirmerie | Film |
| 1982 | L'apprentissage de la ville | Actor: Le valet | TV series |
| 1982 | Merci Bernard | Actor | TV series |
| 1982 | Paris Saint-Lazare | Actor: L'infirmier togolais | Film |
| 1982 | Le corbillard de Jules | Actor: Dimba | Film |
| 1982 | L'appât du gain | Actor | Film |
| 1983 | Médecins de nuit | Actor: Mamadou | TV series |
| 1983 | Cinéma 16 | Actor: Toussaint | TV series |
| 1983 | Suicides | Actor | Film |
| 1984 | Frankenstein 90 by Alain Jessua | Actor: Witness at the slaughterhouse | Film |
| 1984 | My New Partner / Le Cop (Les Ripoux) by Claude Zidi | Actor: Le marabout | Film |
| 1985 | Kubyre | Actor | Film |
| 1986 | Follow My Gaze (Suivez mon regard) by Jean Curtelin | Actor | Film |
| 1986 | Black Mic-Mac by Thomas Gilou | Actor: Mamadou, Writer | Film |
| 1986 | The Joint Brothers (Les frères Pétard) by Hervé Palud | Actor: Sammy | Film |
| 1988 | Y a bon les blancs by Marco Ferreri | Actor | Film |
| 1988 | Black Sequence (Série noire) | Actor: King | TV series |
| 1988 | Ada in the Jungle (Ada dans la jungle) by Gérard Zingg | Actor | Film |
| 1989 | Les Maris, les Femmes, les Amants by Pascal Thomas | Actor: Pierre-André | Film |
| 1990 | Les nouveaux chevaliers du ciel | Actor: Djama | TV series |
| 1990 | L'alligator | Actor | Film |
| 1991 | Cheb | Actor: Le chauffeur malien | Film |
| 1991 | La valse des pigeons | Actor | Film |
| 1991 | Blanc d'ébène | Actor: Le capitaine Traoré, Director, Screenwriter | Film |
| 1993 | Antoine Rives, juge du terrorisme | Actor: L'ambassadeur congolais à Paris | TV series |
| 1994 | Les Cinq Dernières Minutes | Actor: Le gardien, in episode Meurtre à l'université | TV series |
| 1994 | Le cri du coeur | Actor: Mamadou | Film |
| 1994 | Little Indian, Big City (Un indien dans la ville) by Hervé Palud | Actor: Mr. Bonaventure | Film |
| 1994 | The Golden Ball (Le Ballon d'Or) | Director, writer | Film |
| 1995 | Arthur Rimbaud, L'homme aux semelles de vent | Actor: Mélénik | TV series |
| 1996 | Hi Cousin! (Salut Cousin!) by Merzak Allouache | Actor: Le voisin | Film |
| 1998 | Chez ma tante | Actor | TV series |
| 2000 | Lumumba by Raoul Peck | Actor: Joseph Okito | Film |
| 2002 | Et demain, Paula? | Actor: Louis | TV series |
| 2003 | Paris selon Moussa | Actor: Moussa Sidibé, Director, Producer, Writer | Film |
| 2006 | Le grand appartement | Actor: Oussamba | Film |
| 2006 | Africa Paradis by Sylvestre Amoussou | Actor: Kobaou | Film |
| 2009 | Homeless Without You (Pas de toit sans moi) | Actor: Tonton Fall, Writer | TV series |
| 2012 | Clash (Clash) by Pascal Lahmani | Actor: Théophile | TV series |

== Awards ==
Doukouré's awards include:

| Year | Festival | Award | Work |
|---|---|---|---|
| 1991 | Festival International du Film Francophone de Namur (FIFF) | Jury Special Prize | Blanc d'ébène |
| 1991 | Festival international du film d'Amiens (FIFAM) | Special Jury Award | Blanc d'ébène |
| 2003 | Panafrican Film and Television Festival of Ouagadougou (FESPACO) | Best Actor | Paris selon Moussa |
| 2003 | Panafrican Film and Television Festival of Ouagadougou (FESPACO) | UNESCO Award | Paris selon Moussa |
| 2008 | Festival international du film d'Amiens | Golden Unicorn for Career Achievement | |
