= Mariam Kaba =

French-Guinean actress (born 1961)

- Born: August 9, 1961 (age 64); Kankan, Guinea
- Occupation: Actress

Mariam Kaba (born 9 August 1961) is a French-Guinean actress.

== Biography ==
Kaba was born in Kankan, Guinea, the daughter of Mohamed Ba Kaba, a diplomat and the author of several books on Islam. She moved to France in the early 1980s. After receiving her baccalaureate, Kaba enrolled at École des nouveaux métiers de la communication largely at the behest of her father. She only attended the school for a year and spent the money her father sent her on acting lessons, studying under Isabelle Sadoyan.

Kaba's first stage role was as the wife of Toussaint Louverture, alongside Benjamin Jules-Rosette, director of the Théâtre noir in Paris. Soon thereafter, she landed a role in the TV series Marc and Sophie. In 1989, Kaba made her film debut in Périgord noir, directed by Nicolas Ribowski. She played Maina, a young woman who came to work in the Périgord region. In 1992, she starred in her first African film, Blanc d'ébène. A World War II epic directed by Cheik Doukouré, she played a nurse engaged to the teacher Lancéi Kanté. Later in the year, Kaba appeared in Idrissa Ouedraogo's Samba Traoré. She collaborated with Doukouré again in 1994, in Le Ballon d'or.

Her son was born in 1999. In 2000, Kaba played Pauline Lumumba, wife of the politician Patrice Lumumba, in Raoul Peck's Lumumba. Kaba had known his son, Roland, in her youth but did not want to meet Pauline in advance of the role. She fought for the role because she was interested in the history.

Kaba has appeared in more than 15 French TV shows and TV films, such as Navarro, Villa mon rêve, l'Avocate, Quatre cent suspects and Justice de femmes. Her most controversial performance was in the 2002 TV films Fatou la Malienne and Fatou l'Espoir, directed by Daniel Vigne. Kaba played the mother of Fatou, forcing her into an unwilling marriage. It sparked outcry in Mali and led to her being heckled on the street. Kaba explains that she read the script before meeting the real Fatou, and would never allow her husband to do a similar thing to her daughter.

== Partial filmography ==
- 1989 : Périgord noir as Maina
- 1989 : Vanille Fraise as the first wife of Hippolyte
- 1992 : Blanc d'ébène as Saly
- 1992 : Samba Traoré as Saratou
- 1994 : Le Ballon d'or as Fanta
- 1995 : Pullman paradis as Jeja Sembene
- 1997 : Saraka bô as the wife of Marabout
- 1999 : Haut les cœurs!
- 2000 : Lumumba as Pauline Lumumba
- 2001 : Quand on sera grand
- 2001 : Paris selon Moussa as Mame Traoré
- 2005 : Africa Paradis as the president of the National Assembly
- 2006 : Le Grand Appartement as the tenth wife of Oussamba
- 2009 : La Journée de la jupe as the mother of Mouss
- 2010 : Turk's Head as the African mother
- 2011 : Un Pas en avant as Gentivi
- 2011 : Polisse as the complaining woman at the police station
- 2014 : Valentin Valentin as the beautiful African
- 2016 : The Wedding Ring as the dethatcher
- 2017 : Il a déjà tes yeux as Madame Cissé
- 2018 : Vaurien as Salamata
