= Ratatouille =

French stewed vegetable dish

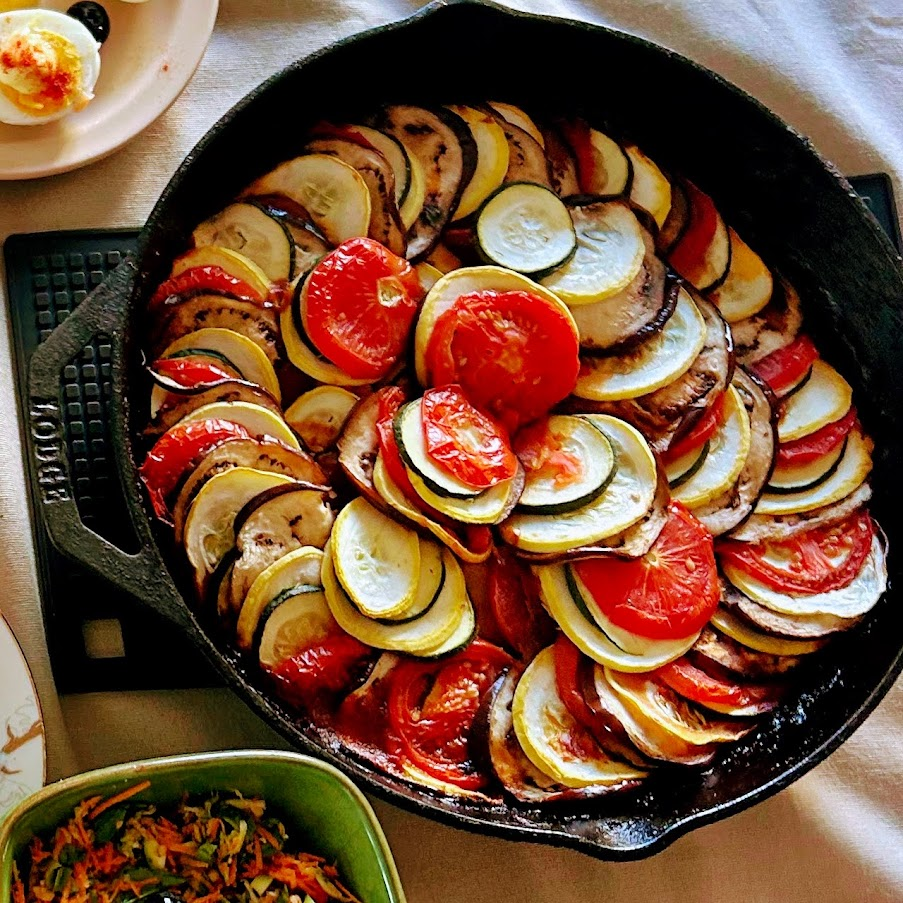
- Ratatouille, in its layered confit byaldi variation, served with a tomato cream sauce
- Alternative names: Ratatouille niçoise
- Type: Stew
- Course: Main course
- Place of origin: France
- Region or state: Provence-Alpes-Côte d'Azur
- Main ingredients: Vegetables (tomatoes, onions, courgette, aubergine, bell peppers, garlic, marjoram, fennel and basil or bay leaves, thyme)
- Variations: Confit byaldi

Ratatouille (/ˌrætəˈtuːi/ RAT-ə-TOO-ee, French: [ʁatatuj]; Occitan: ratatolha [ʀataˈtuʎɔ]) is a traditional French vegetable dish originating in the Provence region of southern France, particularly associated with Nice and its surrounding region. It developed within the context of rural Provençal cuisine, where seasonal vegetables were stewed together as a practical means of putting surplus summer produce to use. The dish consists of a stew or saute of seasonal summer vegetables cooked in olive oil and is sometimes referred to as ratatouille niçoise (French: [niswaz]).

Although preparation methods and cooking times vary considerably by region and household, ratatouille is typically made with tomatoes, onions, garlic, courgettes (zucchini), aubergines (eggplants) and bell pepper, seasoned with herbs characteristic of Provençal cuisine. These may include fresh herbs such as basil, marjoram or fennel, as well as dried herbs such as thyme, bay leaves, or blended herbs de Provence.

== Etymology ==
The term ratatouille derives from the Occitan ratatolha and the related French verbs ratouiller and tatouiller, which are expressive forms of touiller, meaning "to stir" or "to toss".

In the early 19th century, the word was originally used to describe a coarse stew or mixed dish, sometimes with a pejorative connotation, rather than a specific vegetable preparation. Early printed references show that the term applied broadly to rustic mixtures, indicating that the name predates the standardized recipe known today.

== History ==
The development of ratatouille in its modern form depended on the gradual incorporation of several vegetables introduced into European diets. Tomatoes, peppers, and squash were introduced to France after the 16th century following contact with the Americas of the New World, but were not widely accepted as food until the 18th and 19th centuries. Aubergine, introduced earlier through Mediterranean culinary influence, became established in southern France before spreading northward. Once these ingredients became commonplace in Provence, they were combined with olive oil, onions, garlic and local herbs into vegetable stews resembling modern ratatouille.

Although vegetable stews had long been prepared in Provence, historical evidence suggests that no fully developed recipe identifiable as modern ratatouille appears in printed cookbooks before the late 19th or early 20th century. Earlier preparations varied considerably and did not consistently include the now-standard combination of aubergines, tomatoes, courgettes and peppers. The consolidation of these ingredients into a recognized dish appears to be a relatively recent culinary development, where a modern version does not appear in print until 1930.

By the early 20th century, ratatouille became increasingly associated with the cuisine of Nice. Regional cookery texts describe variations in preparation, including methods in which vegetables are cooked either together or sautéed separately before being combined. The inclusion of ratatouille in major culinary reference works during this period contributed to its codification as a distinct Provençal specialty, and facilitated its recognition beyond its regional origins.

The international recognition of ratatouille expanded significantly in the mid-20th century, particularly through the growing interest in Mediterranean cuisines outside France. Cookbooks aimed at English-speaking audiences presented ratatouille as emblematic of southern French cooking, emphasizing olive oil, ripe seasonal vegetables and simplicity of preparation. Through these publications, ratatouille transitioned from a regional peasant dish to a widely recognized component of French cuisine.

From the late 20th century onward, professional chefs began reinterpreting ratatouille using refined techniques and modern presentation. One influential variation, known as Confit byaldi, arranged the vegetables in thin, carefully layered slices rather than preparing them as a stew, aligning the dish with contemporary haute cuisine aesthetics. While Confit Byaldi and similar interpretations influenced later fine-dining adaptations and popular representations, they differ substantially from the traditional rustic preparation associated with Provençal home cooking.

== Preparation ==
The Guardian's food and drink writer Felicity Cloake wrote in 2016 that, considering ratatouille's relatively recent origins, there is a great variety of methods of preparing it. The Larousse Gastronomique says, "according to the purists, the different vegetables should be cooked separately, then combined and cooked slowly together until they attain a smooth, creamy consistency."

== Gallery ==
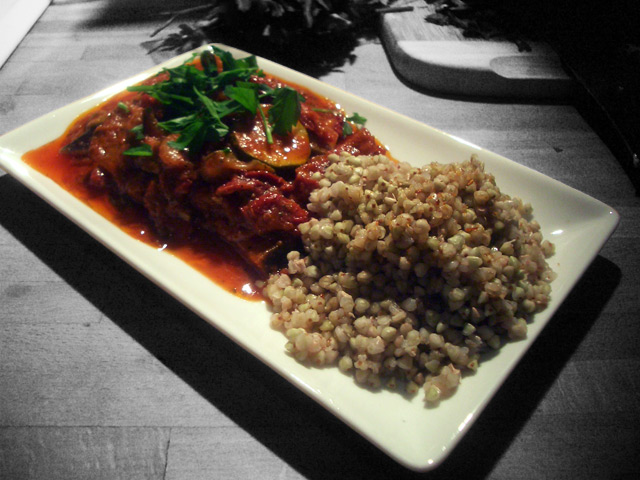
Ratatouille niçoise, served with buckwheat

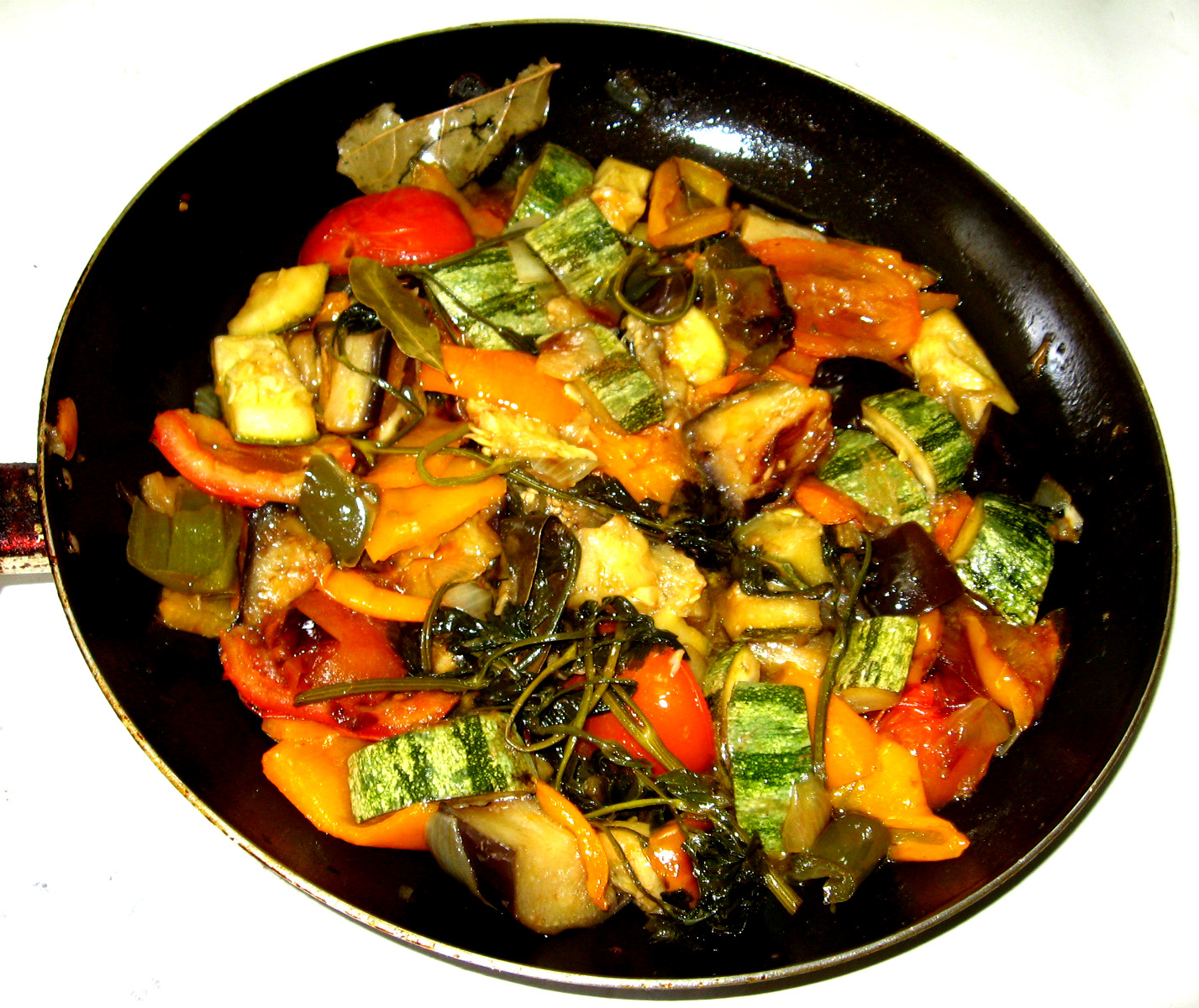
Ratatouille niçoise with fresh herbs

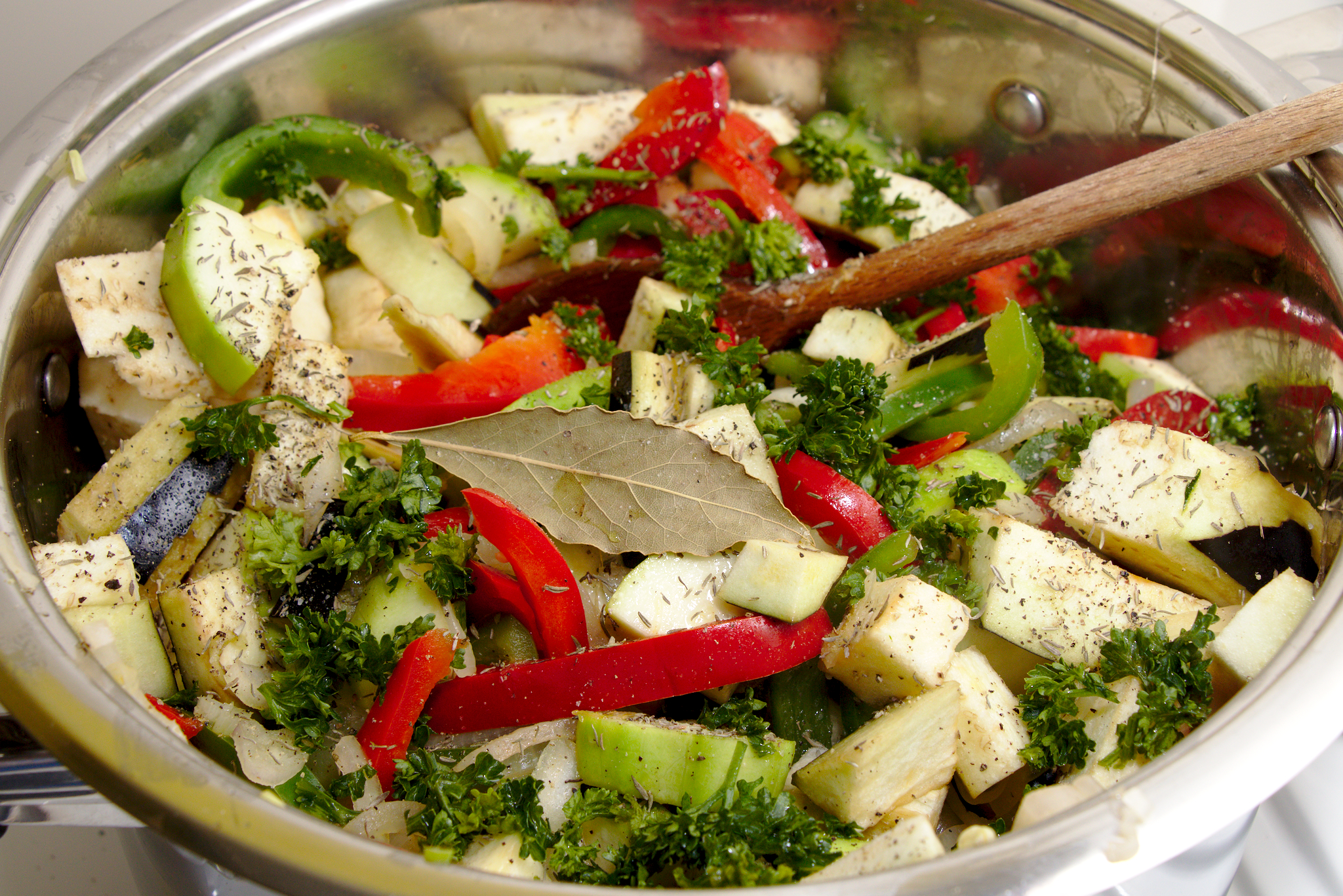
Raw ingredients

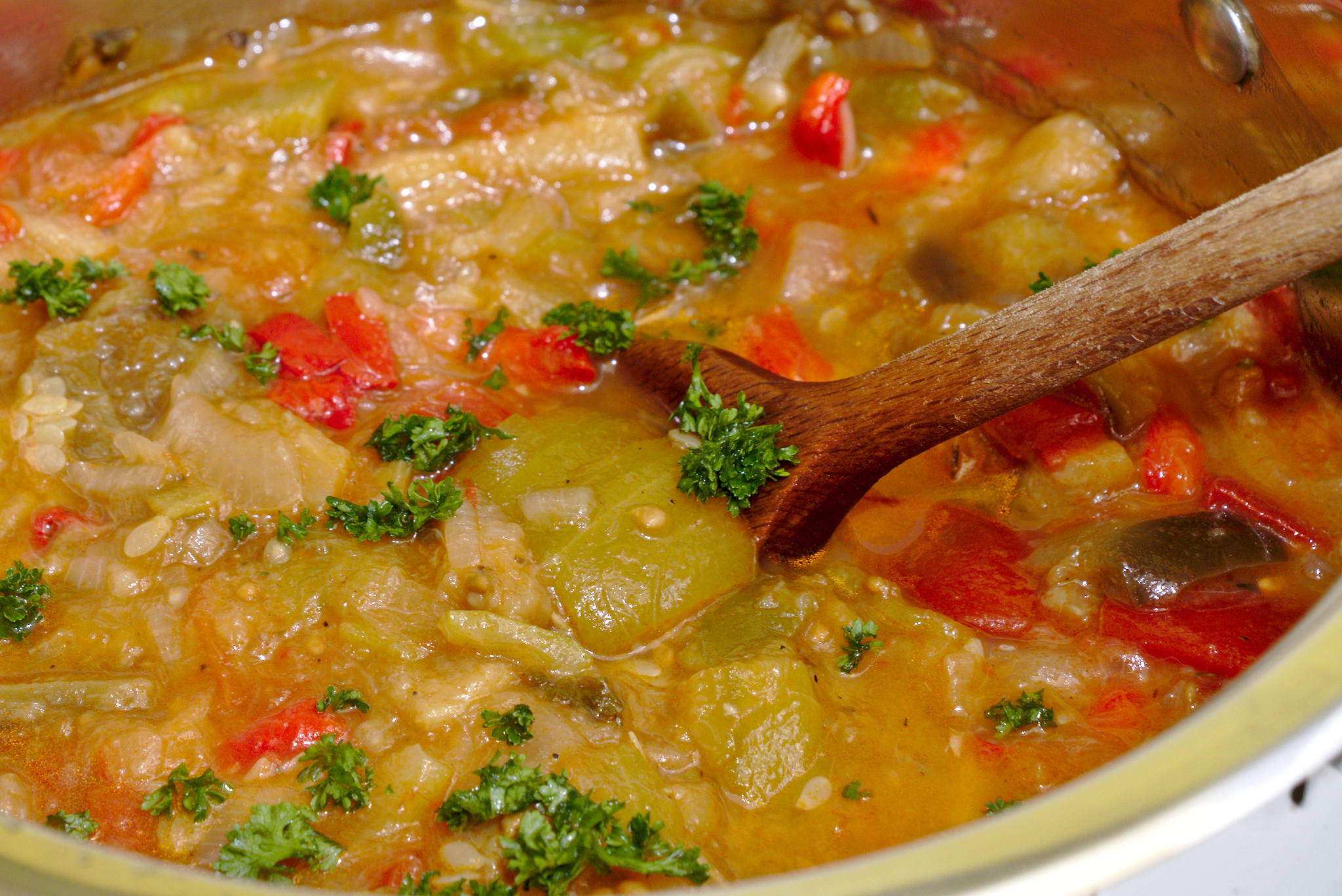
Heavily simmered and garnished with fresh parsley

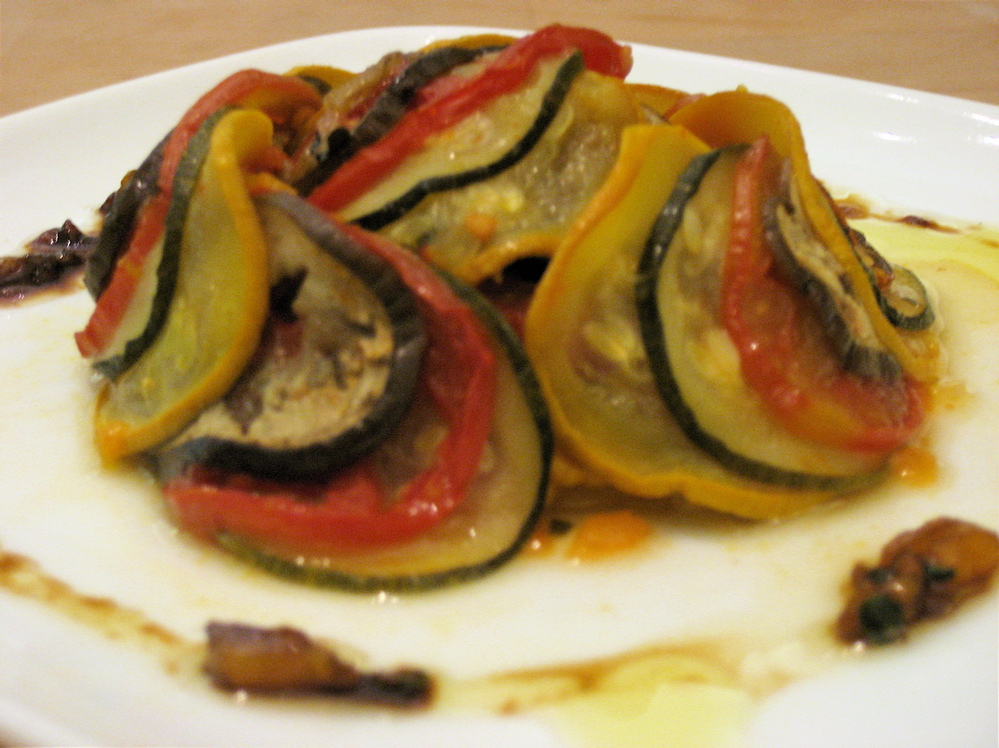
Small pyramid (Confit byaldi)

== Related dishes ==
Dishes of similar ingredients or preparation style exist in many cuisines.There are dishes which have the same ingredients or similar ways of preparation across a number of Mediterranean and other cuisines. It also has similar vegetable dishes in southern France, such as piperade, bohémienne and chichoumeille. Other regional dishes are pisto (Spain), samfaina (Catalonia), tombet (Mallorca) and caponata and peperonata (Italy).

These include: piperade (South-West of France), bohémienne (Vaucluse), chichoumeille (Languedoc), tian (South east of France), Confit byaldi (created by Michel Guérard), pisto (Castilian-Manchego, Spain), samfaina (Catalan, Spain), tombet (Mallorcan), ciambotta, caponata and peperonata (Italy), briám and tourloú (Greek), şakşuka and türlü (Turkish), ajapsandali (Georgian), lecsó (Hungarian), pinakbet (Filipino), ghiveci (Romanian) and zaalouk (Moroccan). Different parts of the Indian subcontinent have their own versions of winter vegetable stew. Gujarat makes undhiyu, Kerala avial (with coconut and local spices), and Bengal shukto.

== In popular culture ==
In 2007, Walt Disney Pictures and Pixar Animation Studios released the film Ratatouille. The movie gave widespread exposure to this dish around the world.

== See also ==
- List of stews
- List of vegetable dishes
- Shakshouka
