= Marcelin Bossou =

Togolese film director

- Born: Bossou-Hunkali Akakpo Massinou; May 3, 1984 (age 41); Lomé
- Occupations: Film director, film producer, screenwriter
- Years active: 2010-present

Marcelin Bossou (born 3 May 1984) is a Togolese film director, film producer, and screenwriter.

== Biography ==
Bossou was born in Lomé, Togo in 1984. He was the son of Beninese parents. Bossou's father was the director of a theater company. Bossou studied telecommunications in the Ivory Coast and earned a Higher Technician Certificate. He worked for the private television channel Radio Télévision Delta Santé as a technician and later a director.

In 2008, he enrolled at the Ecole Supérieure des Arts Visuels (ESAV) in Marrakesh, Morocco after receiving a scholarship. Bossou directed his first short films, La Bourse ou la vie and L'inconnu in 2010. He received his license in Film Studies, Directing option, in 2012. Bossou's graduation film, Nuit de Noces, was entered in several film festivals such as the Mediterranean Short Film Festival of Tangier, the African Film Festival of Luxor, and the African Film Festival of Poitiers. Nuit de Noces received the Grand Prix at the Atakpamé Short Film Festival in Togo and the special René Monory prize at the Panafrican Film and Television Festival of Ouagadougou. It examines the burdens women face when getting married, including proving their virginity.

After graduation, Bossou directed L'anniversaire. He founded the audiovisual company Marbos Productions in Lomé in 2015. Its main objective is to offer support to young Togolese film students to make their first films. In 2015, he directed Les deux frères. The film received the prize for best photography at the Clap Ivoire festival. In 2019, Bossou produced the films La vie de Daniel directed by Gilbert Bararmna and Femme Ebène by Rachel Kpizing.

Bossou is currently working on his first feature film, Broken Drums, scheduled to be released in 2021. He teaches film analysis, writing and technique at the Higher School of Cinematography (ESEC) in Lomé.

== Filmography ==
- 2010 : La Bourse ou la vie
- 2010 : L'inconnu
- 2012 : Nuit de Noces
- 2012 : L'anniversaire
- 2015 : Les deux frères
- 2017 : Brigitte
- 2017 : Une famille pas comme les autres
- 2019 : Broken-Drums
- 2019 : La vie de Daniel
- 2019 : Femme ébène
