= L'orage africain: un continent sous influence =

- Directed by: Sylvestre Amoussou
- Written by: Sylvestre Amoussou
- Edited by: Dan Rappaport
- Production company: Koffi Productions
- Distributed by: Tchoko-Tchoko Productions
- Release date: 2017
- Running time: 89 minutes
- Country: Benin

L'orage africain: un continent sous influence (lit. 'The African Storm: A Continent Under Influence') is a 2017 Beninese drama film directed, co-written, and starring Sylvestre Amoussou.

== Synopsis ==
The President of an imaginary African country, seeing the natural wealth of his country exploited by Western companies, decides to nationalise all the means of production developed in the nation by foreigners, such as oil wells, gold and diamond mining.

== Cast ==
- Sylvestre Amoussou
- Philippe Caroit
- Sandrine Bulteau
- Eriq Ebouaney
- Laurent Mendy
- Sandra Adjaho

== Production ==
It is the third feature film directed by Amoussou Sylvestre, who also co-wrote the script along with Bulleau Sandrine and Pierre Sauvil, and stars in the film.

== Release ==
The film had its world premiere screening in competition at the 25th Panafrican Film and Television Festival of Ouagadougou (FESPACO) in Ouagadougou (FESPACO) in March 2017.

It was released on Blu-ray on 1 November 2017 in France.

== Accolades ==
The film won the Étalon de Yennenga prize (Silver Stallion) at the 2017 Panafrican Film and Television Festival of Ouagadougou in Ouagadougou (FESPACO).
