= Le Mec idéal =

2011 Franco-Ivorian comedy drama film

- Directed by: Owell Brown
- Written by: Owell Brown; Raymond Ngoh
- Produced by: Ferdinand Esso
- Starring: Emma Lohoues; Mike Danon; Serge Abessolo; Marie-Louise Asseu; Welcome Neba; Therese Taba
- Cinematography: Célestin Kalet
- Edited by: Sandrine Trésor
- Music by: Mike Danon
- Production company: Icoast Movie
- Release date: March 2011 (FESPACO)
- Running time: 105 minutes
- Country: Ivory Coast
- Language: French

Le Mec idéal (lit. 'The Ideal Guy') is a 2011 Franco-Ivorian romantic comedy film directed by Owell A. Brown and produced by Ferdinand Esso for Icoast Movie. The film stars Emma Lohoues, with Mike Danon, Serge Abessolo, Marie-Louise Asseu, Welcome Neba, and Therese Taba in supporting roles.

== Plot ==
The film is about Estelle, a highly successful hairdresser, who fails in relationships. In order to find happiness and a soulmate, her friends Nina and Rebecca organize a casting.

== Cast ==
The cast includes:

- Emma Lohoues as Estelle
- Mike Danon
- Serge Abessolo
- Marie-Louise Asseu
- Welcome Neba
- Therese Taba
- Kadhy Toure

== Production ==
Le Mec idéal was directed by Owell A. Brown and produced by Ferdinand Esso for Icoast Movie, and is a dual production of France and Ivory Coast. The dialogue is in French.

The score was by Mike Danon, cinematography by Célestin Kalet, and Sandrine Trésor edited the film.

== Release and reception ==
The film premiered at the 2011 FESPACO (PanAfrican Festival of Film and Television of Ouagadougou) and was released in France on 22 November 2011.

== Reception ==
The film received positive reviews from critics, and won the Bronze Stallion Award at FESPACO in 2011.

== See also ==
- Marie-Louise Asseu
- PanAfrican Festival of Film and Television of Ouagadougou
