= A Thousand and One Hands =

- Directed by: Souheil Ben-Barka
- Written by: Ahmed Badry, Cerami Vincenza
- Starring: Abdou Chaibane, Aissa Ghazi, Mimsy Farmer
- Cinematography: Girolamo Larosa
- Edited by: Abdeslam Agnaou
- Music by: Abdou Tahar
- Release date: 1972
- Running time: 71 minutes
- Country: Morocco
- Language: Moroccan Arabic

A Thousand and One Hands (French: Les Mille et Une Mains, Arabic: Alf yad wa yad en arabe) is a 1973 Moroccan film directed by Souheil Ben-Barka. It was screened abroad and received critical acclaim despite being censored in Morocco.

== Synopsis ==
In Marrakech, veteran dyer Moha and his son Miloud carry bundles of woolen thread. Thus begins the painstaking work of weaving carpets destined for sale abroad, and the hard work of the men, women and girls. With hardly any dialogue, the film illustrates the inhuman conditions of workers and the class struggle in Morocco in the 1970s.

== Cast ==
- Abdou Chaibane
- Aissa Elgazi
- Mimsy Farmer
- Ahmed Si

== Awards and accolades ==
- Georges Sadoul Prize, Paris (1973)
- Etalon de Yennenga - FESPACO (1973)
