= Samba Traoré =

- Directed by: Idrissa Ouedraogo
- Written by: Idrissa Ouedraogo; Santiago Amigorena; Jacques Arhex
- Produced by: Idrissa Ouedraogo
- Starring: Bakary Sangaré; Mariam Kaba; Abdoulaye Komboudri
- Cinematography: Pierre-Laurent Chénieux; Mathieu Vadepied
- Edited by: Joëlle Dufour
- Music by: Faton Cahen; Wasis Diop
- Distributed by: New Yorker Films (U.S.)
- Release date: 10 September 1993
- Running time: 85 minutes
- Countries: Burkina Faso; France; South Africa
- Language: Dioula

Samba Traoré (1993) is a Burkinabé drama film in the Mossi language (Mòoré) directed by Idrissa Ouedraogo. It was entered into the 43rd Berlin International Film Festival where it won the Silver Bear.

== Plot ==
Samba Traoré and another man rob a gas station in the middle of the night in Banfora. The owner shoots Samba's partner, but Samba escapes with a large amount of money. He evades the police and returns to his home village of Malon, where most residents eke out a living as subsistence farmers. He reunites with his parents, his shiftless friend Salif, and Saratou, a woman he knew before they each moved to cities for work. Several years have evidently passed since Samba left the village, and he claims to have made his money working on a banana plantation, though Salif and some other villagers doubt him. Samba's easygoing, confident manner hides the rage and fear he feels over the robbery. One night, he drunkenly hints to Salif that he has committed a crime, but denies it when Salif deduces that he had committed a robbery.

Samba begins to use his money to acquire a place of respect in the village. He purchases a herd of cattle, which he gives to the village collectively, and proposes marriage to Saratou, with whom he has fallen in love. Saratou accepts after Samba bonds with her son Ali, whose father died years before, but is shocked when Samba violently chases another former partner of hers, Ismaël, away from the village. Samba pays for a lavish wedding and hires much of the village to build a large house for Saratou. He also builds and opens a bar in the village. He hires Salif and his wife to help him with the house and bar, leaving Salif with feelings of inadequacy. Samba continues to agonize over his past, reacting angrily when Saratou asks about the source of his money.

As time passes, Saratou becomes pregnant and Samba grows closer to Ali. When Saratou goes into labor and the villagers worry that she will have a difficult delivery, Samba refuses to ride with her to the city. He shoves money into his family's hands and tells them to take her to the city, and is absent when she painfully gives birth in a truck bed. At the same time, Samba's father finds his money and gun hidden in Saratou's house. He sets fire to the house, destroying the money, and accuses Samba of having stolen the money.

With Ali's help, Samba eventually reconciles with Saratou. The family is walking outside the village when police officers arrive; Ismaël, who eventually returned to the city, has seen his photo in a newspaper article about the robbery. Salif attempts to warn Samba, but only draws the officers' attention to Samba. They shoot Salif in the leg, and Samba surrenders. Saratou promises to await Samba's return, while Salif jokes that he knew all along that Samba had stolen the money. The police drive Samba away.

== Cast ==
- Bakary Sangaré as Samba Traoré
- Mariam Kaba as Saratou
- Abdoulaye Komboudri as Salif
- Irène Tassembedo as Binta
- Moumouni Campaoré as Ali
- Sibidou Ouédraogo as Awa
- Krin Casimir Traoré as Seydou
- Firmine Coulebaly as Koro
- Hyppolite Ouangrawa as Ismaël
