= Paris selon Moussa =

2003 Franco-Guinean drama film

- Directed by: Cheik Doukouré
- Written by: Cheik Doukouré; Danielle Ryan
- Produced by: Danielle Ryan
- Starring: Élisabeth Vitali; Cheik Doukouré; Mariam Kaba; Louis Navarre
- Cinematography: Hugues de Haeck
- Edited by: Michèle Robert-Lauliac
- Music by: Hélène Blazy
- Production companies: Bako BroductionsLes; Films de l'Alliance
- Distributed by: Les Films de l'Alliance; Visual Factory
- Release date: 15 May 2003
- Running time: 96 minutes
- Countries: France; Guinea
- Language: French
- Box office: $8,243

Paris selon Moussa (Paris According to Moussa), is a 2003 Franco-Guinean drama film directed by Cheik Doukouré and produced by Danielle Ryan. The film stars director himself in the lead role whereas Élisabeth Vitali, Vincent McDoom and Magloire Delcros-Varaud made supportive roles. The film revolves around Moussa Sidibé, a farmer in Guinea who sent to France to buy a water pump and the problems faced during the journey.

The film received critics acclaim and screened worldwide. The film later won the Human Rights Award by the United Nations in 2003. In the same year, director and ead actor Doukouré won the Best Actor award at FESPACO 2003.

== Cast ==
- Cheik Doukouré as Moussa Sidibé
- Élisabeth Vitali as Nathalie
- Vincent McDoom as Zanzie
- Magloire Delcros-Varaud as Naomie
- Andrée Damant as La mère de Nathalie
- Mariam Kaba as Mame Traoré
- Suzanne Kouamé as Aïssatou
- Louis Navarre as Le père Albert
- Martial Odone as James
- Mamadou Fomba as Fodé Sangaré
- Sylvie Flepp as La vendeuse de pompes
- Claude Koener as Le vendeur de pompes
- Jean-Marc Truong as Chou
- Mariama Samba Baldé as Mouna
- Pascal N'Zonzi as Zanga
- Sylvestre Amoussou as Abraham
- Jean-Louis Cassarino as Julien
- Jim Adhi Limas as Ginseng
- Marie-Christine Laurent as L'hôtesse à l'aéroport
- Michel Melki in uncredited role
- Diouc Koma in uncredited role
