= Étalon de Yennenga =

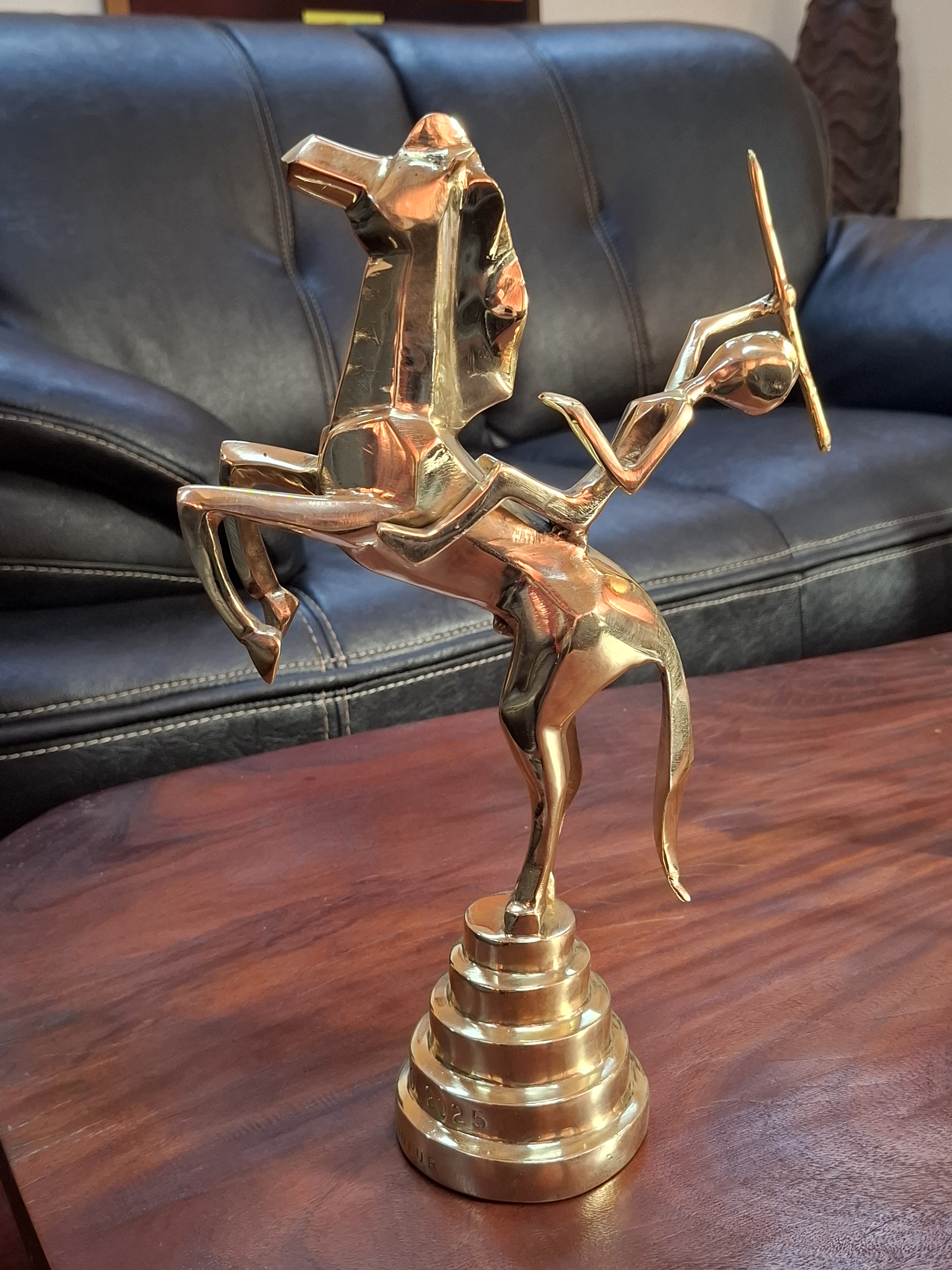
- Awarded for: Best Film of the Year
- Country: Burkina Faso
- Presented by: FESPACO
- First award: 1972
- Final award: 2025

Étalon de Yennenga (English: Stallion of Yennenga) is an award bestowed to distinguished individuals involved with the Burkinabe's silver screen, awarded by the biannual Panafrican Film and Television Festival of Ouagadougou (FESPACO), in recognition of the grand prize for the Best Film. First commenced in 1972, it is considered the most prestigious award in African cinema. Since 2005, the top award is known as the Étalon d'or de Yennenga, and two further awards, the Étalon d'Argent de Yennenga (the Silver Stallion) and the Étalon de bronze de Yennenga (the Bronze Stallion) have also been awarded.

== History ==
Étalon de Yennenga means Stallion of Yennenga in French and refers to the 12th century Princess Yennenga. The Mossi people, the main ethnic group in Burkina Faso, consider her a founder of the Mossi Kingdoms. The story of Yennenga dates back to the beginning of the 12th century in the Kingdom of Dagbon. King Nedega's daughter, Yennenga, was a horse-woman, and adept at using javelins, spears and bows.

The first winner of the Étalon de Yennenga was Oumarou Ganda in 1972 with his film Le Wazzou polygame.

In 2005, the 19th edition of FESPACO, two new awards were established. The Yennenga Standard Grand Prize became the Golden Stallion of Yennenga (Étalon d'or de Yennenga), and the new awards are named the Silver Stallion (Étalon d'Argent de Yennenga) and the Bronze Stallion Étalon de Bronze de Yennenga.

== Award ==
The trophies are designed and made by Burkinabe sculptor Ali Nikiméa, and resemble Yennenga with her horse and weapon.

== List of winners of the Yennenga Stallion ==
Year	Winner	Pictures
1972 (Ceremony on 12 March 1972)	Le Wazzou Polygame by Oumarou Ganda (Niger)	
1973 (Ceremony on 13 February 1973)	A Thousand and One Hands by Souheil Ben Barka (Morocco)	
1976 (Ceremony on 10 February 1976)	Muna Moto by Jean-Pierre Dikongué Pipa (Cameroon)	
1979 (Ceremony on 10 February 1979)	Baara by Souleymane Cissé (Mali)	
1981 (Ceremony on 1 March, 1981)	Djeli by Fadika Kramo-Lanciné (Ivory Coast)	
1983 (Ceremony on 13 February 1983)	Finyè by Souleymane Cissé (Mali)	
1985 (Ceremony on 2 March 1985)	Story of a Meeting by Brahim Tsaki (Algeria)	
1987 (Ceremony on 28 February 1987)	Sarraounia de Med Hondo (Mauritania)	
1989 (Ceremony on 4 March 1989)	Heritage Africa by Kwaw Ansah (Ghana)	
1991 (Ceremony on 2 March 1991)	Tilaï by Idrissa Ouedraogo (Burkina Faso)	
1993 (Ceremony on 4 March 1993)	Au nom du Christ by Gnoan Roger M'Bala (Ivory Coast)	
1995 (Ceremony on 4 March 1995)	Guimba by Cheick Oumar Sissoko (Mali)	
1997 (Ceremony on 1 March, 1997)	Buud Yam by Gaston Kaboré (Burkina Faso)	
1999 (Ceremony on 6 March 1999)	Identity Pieces by Mwezé Ngangura (Democratic Republic of Congo)	
2001 (Ceremony on 3 March 2001)	Ali Zaoua by Nabil Ayouch (Morocco)	
2003 (Ceremony on 1 March ^{,} 2003)	Waiting for Happiness by Abderrahmane Sissako (Mauritania)	
2005 (Ceremony on 5 March 2005)	Golden Stallion: Drum by Zola Maseko (South Africa)	
2005 (Ceremony on 5 March 2005)	Silver Stallion: The Dark Room by Hassan Benjelloun (Morocco)	
2005 (Ceremony on 5 March 2005)	Bronze Stallion: Tasuma by Kollo Daniel Sanou (Burkina Faso)	
2007 (Ceremony on 3 March 2007)	Golden Stallion: Ezra de Newton Aduaka (Nigeria)	
2007 (Ceremony on 3 March 2007)	Silver Stallion: Les Saignantes by Jean-Pierre Bekolo (Cameroon)	
2007 (Ceremony on 3 March 2007)	Bronze Stallion: Daratt of Mahamat Saleh Haroun (Chad)	
2009 (Ceremony on 7 March 2009)	Golden Stallion: Teza by Hailé Gerima (Ethiopia)	
2009 (Ceremony on 7 March 2009)	Silver Stallion: Nothing But the truth by John Kani (South Africa)	
2009 (Ceremony on 7 March 2009)	Bronze Stallion: Masquerades by Lyes Salem (Algeria)	
2011 (Ceremony on 5 March 2011)	Golden Stallion: Pegasus by Mohamed Mouftakir (Morocco)	
2011 (Ceremony on 5 March 2011)	Silver Stallion: A Screaming Man by Mahamat Haroun Saley (Chad)	
2011 (Ceremony on 5 March 2011)	Bronze Stallion: The Ideal Guy by Owell Brown (Ivory Coast)	
2013 (Ceremony on 2 March 2013)	Golden Stallion: Tey (today) by Alain Gomis (Senegal)	
2013 (Ceremony on 2 March 2013)	Silver Stallion: Yema by Djamila Sahraoui (Algeria)	
2013 (Ceremony on 2 March 2013)	Bronze Stallion: The Pirogue of Moussa Touré (Senegal)	
2015 (Ceremony on 7 March 2015)	Golden Stallion: Fevers by Hicham Ayouch (France, Morocco)	
2015 (Ceremony on 7 March 2015)	Silver Stallion: Fadhma N'Soumer of Belkacem Hadjadj (Algeria)	
2015 (Ceremony on 7 March 2015)	Bronze Stallion: The Eye of the Storm by Sékou Traoré (Burkina Faso)	
2017 (Ceremony on 4 March 2017)	Golden Stallion: Félicité by Alain Gomis (Senegal)	
2017 (Ceremony on 4 March 2017)	Silver Stallion: L'orage africain: un continent sous influence by Sylvestre Amoussou (Benin)	
2017 (Ceremony on 4 March 2017)	Bronze Stallion: A Mile in My Shoes by Saïd Khallaf (Morocco)	
2019 (Ceremony on 2 March 2019)	Golden Stallion: The Mercy of the Jungle by Joël Karekezi (Rwanda)	
2019 (Ceremony on 2 March 2019)	Silver Stallion: Karma by Khaled Youssef (Egypt)	
2019 (Ceremony on 2 March 2019)	Bronze Stallion: Fatwa of Mahmoud Ben Mahmoud (Tunisia)	
2021 (Ceremony on 23 October 2021)	Golden Stallion: The Gravedigger's Wife by Khadar Ayderus Ahmed (Somalia)	
2021 (Ceremony on 23 October 2021)	Silver Stallion: Freda by Gessica Généus (Haiti)	
2021 (Ceremony on 23 October 2021)	Bronze Stallion: A Tale of Love and Desire by Leyla Bouzid (Tunisia)	
2023 (Ceremony on 4 March 2023)	Golden Stallion: Ashkal by Youssef Chebbi (Tunisia)	
2023 (Ceremony on 4 March 2023)	Silver Stallion: Sira by Apolline Traoré (Burkina Faso)	
2023 (Ceremony on 4 March 2023)	Bronze Stallion: Shimoni by Angela Wamai (Kenya)	
2025 (Ceremony on 1 March 2025)	Golden Stallion: Katanga, la danse des scorpions by Dani Kouyaté (Burkina Faso)	
2025 (Ceremony on 1 March 2025)	Silver Stallion: The Village Next to Paradise by Mo Harawe (Somalia)	
2025 (Ceremony on 1 March 2025)	Bronze Stallion: On Becoming a Guinea Fowl by Rungano Nyoni (Zambia)	
