= Marie Louise Asseu =

Ivorian actress, director and film producer (1966 –2016)

- Born: November 21, 1966
- Died: December 7, 2016 (aged 50)
- Other names: Malou
- Occupations: actress, director and film producer.
- Notable work: Le Mec ideal

Marie Louise Asseu (November 21, 1966 – December 7, 2016) was an Ivorian actress, director and film producer, better known by her nickname Malou. In addition, she was also the founder of the Limale Festival of Cote d' Ivore.

Asseu also released various albums.

== Career ==
Asseu participated in several television shows in the Ivory Coast, including the RTI channel's "Mon Experience" ("My Experience"). In 2012, she made her debut as a director with Les infideles. She also appeared in:

- 1989 : Bal Poussière
- 1995 : Faut pas fâcher
- 2003–2007 : Ma famille
- 2008 : Un homme pour deux sœurs
- 2008 : L'Histoire des copines
- 2010 : Sah Sandra
- 2011 : Le Mec ideal
- 2012 : Les infidèles

== Patrick Achi rumor and attempt on Asseu's life ==
During 2011, Asseu barely escaped an attempt on her life by a crowd of young people. According to a newspaper, a rumor suggested that she was having an affair with Patrick Achi, the local politician; this rumor led to a mob that was armed with clubs and other weapons to try to get to her with the apparent intention of lynching her. she was, however, promptly rescued by a gentleman. Assou suffered psychological trauma from this event thereafter until her death.

== Death ==
Asseu suffered poor health during the last few years of her life. Several days before she died, she suffered what was described by doctors as a mild stroke and had to be hospitalized. Doctors kept a deep secrecy about her condition despite the public's interest to find about it and several media attempts to obtain information relating to it. Released from the hospital a few days later and believed to be in recovery, she suffered a second stroke on November 17, 2016, which this time proved fatal, dying of it on December 7.
