= Stéphane Roux (actor) =

French actor

Stéphane Roux is a French voice actor and animator for Disney. He has provided the voice of the cooking channel narrator in the English version of Ratatouille, among other voice talents.

== Filmography ==
- Rabbids Go Home (2009 video game, voice) a.k.a. The lapins crétins - La grosse aventure (France)
- Sagan (2008) .... Le vendeur à la librairie
- Versailles, le rêve d'un roi (2008 TV series) .... Charles Perrault
- Ratatouille (2007, voice) .... TV Narrator
- Paris enquêtes criminelles (2007 TV series) .... Gautier Lamarre (a.k.a. "Law & Order: Paris")
- Africa Paradis (2006) .... Olivier Morel
- Monster Allergy (2006 TV series) (Storyboard Artist)
- Arthur and the Invisibles (2006 film) (storyboard artist) a.k.a. Arthur et les Minimoys (France)
- Kingdom Hearts II (2005 video game) .... Xigbar
- Gadget & the Gadgetinis (2003 TV series) (Assistant Director and Storyboard Supervisor)
- Michel Audiard et le mystère du triangle des Bermudes (2002) (Writer and Director)
- Fantômette (2000 TV cartoon) (Director)
- Mot (1995 TV series) (Layout Artist)
- La Grande Chasse de Nanook (1996 TV series) (Director)
- Space Strikers (1995 TV series) (Background Modeler)
- A Goofy Movie (1995) (layout artist)
- Les aphrorécits (1992)
- Cyrano de Bergerac (1990)
- Valmont (1989) (production assistant)
