= Tian (dish) =

Earthenware vessel of Provence, France

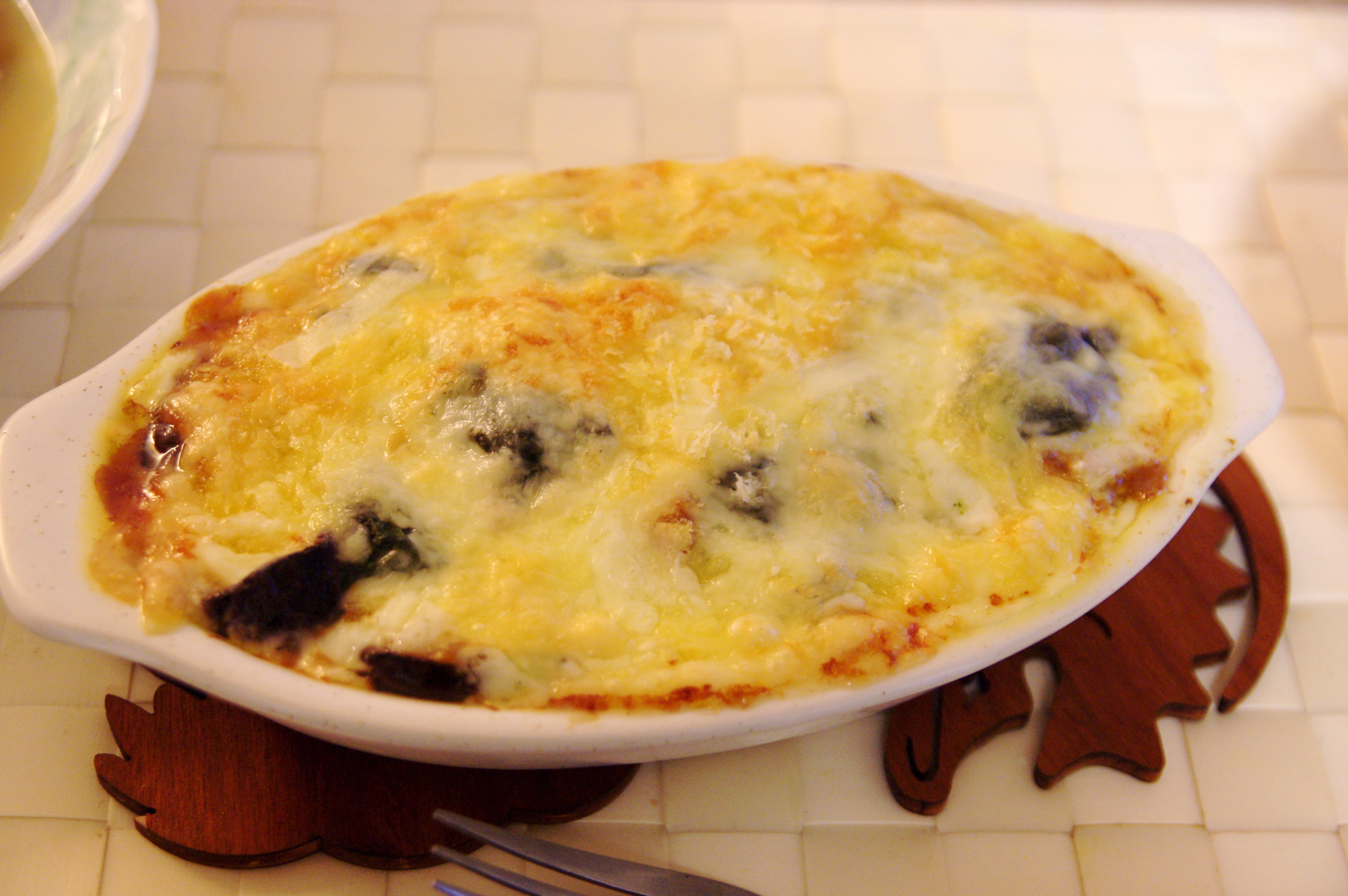
Tian d'aubergine served inside a tian

A tian is an earthenware vessel of Provence used both for cooking and serving. It is also the name of the dish prepared in it and baked in an oven.

Tian comes from the ancient Provençal word designating a terracotta cooking dish, and is also used to refer to food prepared in it. The word comes from the ancient Greek "teganon" (frying pan).

The classic vessel is a truncated cone, flattened at the base and flaring outward to a wide rim. It is traditionally glazed on the inside, and unglazed on the outside. It is shallower than the cassole, the earthenware vessel characteristic of the Camargue and Languedoc. The shape has become less definitive, though the earthenware body remains key.

== Stew dish ==
The dish called tian has also changed over time. An 18th century dictionary describes it as "a lean stew". Modern tian is described as having no added liquid, the ingredients being cooked until their naturally inherent liquid or moisture has evaporated. In Provence, the dish may be made with vegetables alone, but also with lamb, fish, or egg added to vegetables. Goat cheese is a common ingredient. Tian can be described as a gratin in the Provençal style. Typical ingredients in tian are more associated with Provence than with other regions of France.

== See also ==
- List of stews
- Confit byaldi
