= Nanook's Great Hunt =

1996 Canadian animated television series

- Genre: Animated
- Created by: Serge Rosenzweig
- Written by: Françoise Charpiat; Sophie Decroisette; Serge Rosenzweig
- Directed by: Franck Bourgeron; Marc Perret; Stéphane Roux
- Starring: Charles Pestel (French); Evie Mark (Inuktitut)
- Music by: Xavier Cobo; Michaël Dune
- Country of origin: Canada
- Original language: French
- No. of episodes: 26

Production
- Executive producers: Paul Rozenberg; Dana Hastier; Lyse Lafontaine
- Producer: Serge Rosenzweig
- Running time: 26 minutes
- Production companies: Elma Animation; Medver International Inc.; TF1; Mediatoon

Original release
- Release: 3 September 1997

Nanook's Great Hunt (French: La Grande Chasse de Nanook) is a 1996 Canadian animated series depicting a 12-year-old Inuk boy on a journey to find his missing father. It was created and produced by Serge Rosenzweig.

It first aired in France in September 1997, on TF1's TF! Jeunesse. It also aired in Canada on Télétoon, both in French and English. A 70-minute special, titled Nanook: le grand combat/Nanook – The Great Combat and directed by Gérald Fleury, was also produced in 1996.

In February 2000, Aboriginal Peoples Television Network began airing Nanook in Inuktitut, the first animated series to be aired in Nunavik dialects.

The series was directed by Franck Bourgeron, Marc Perret, and Stéphane Roux, and co-produced by Elma Animation, Medver International Inc., and TF1, in association with Mediatoon. The executive producers were Paul Rozenberg, Dana Hastier, and Lyse Lafontaine; the writers were Françoise Charpiat, Sophie Decroisette, and Serge Rosenzweig; the music was composed by Xavier Cobo and Michaël Dune.

== Synopsis ==
From Mediatoon's press flyer: "A boy's journey into manhood through his quest to find his missing father... Set in the harsh landscape of the Canadian Arctic, this enchanting tale revolves around Nanook, a twelve-year-old Inuk boy, who embarks upon a journey to find his missing father, undertaking the challenge of hunting down the mythical bear, Suaq Nanok".

== Episodes ==
A total of 26 episodes of 26 minutes each were produced, plus a 70-minute special titled Nanook – The Great Combat.

== Voice artists ==
Nanook was voiced by Charles Pestel in the French version and Evie Mark in the Inuktitut version.
