= Alimata Salembéré =

Burkinabe film administrator, civil servant and politician

- Born: 9 November 1942 (age 83); Bobo-Dioulasso Department
- Citizenship: Burkina Faso
- Occupations: Film director, Journalist, Civil servant, Filmmaker, Politician

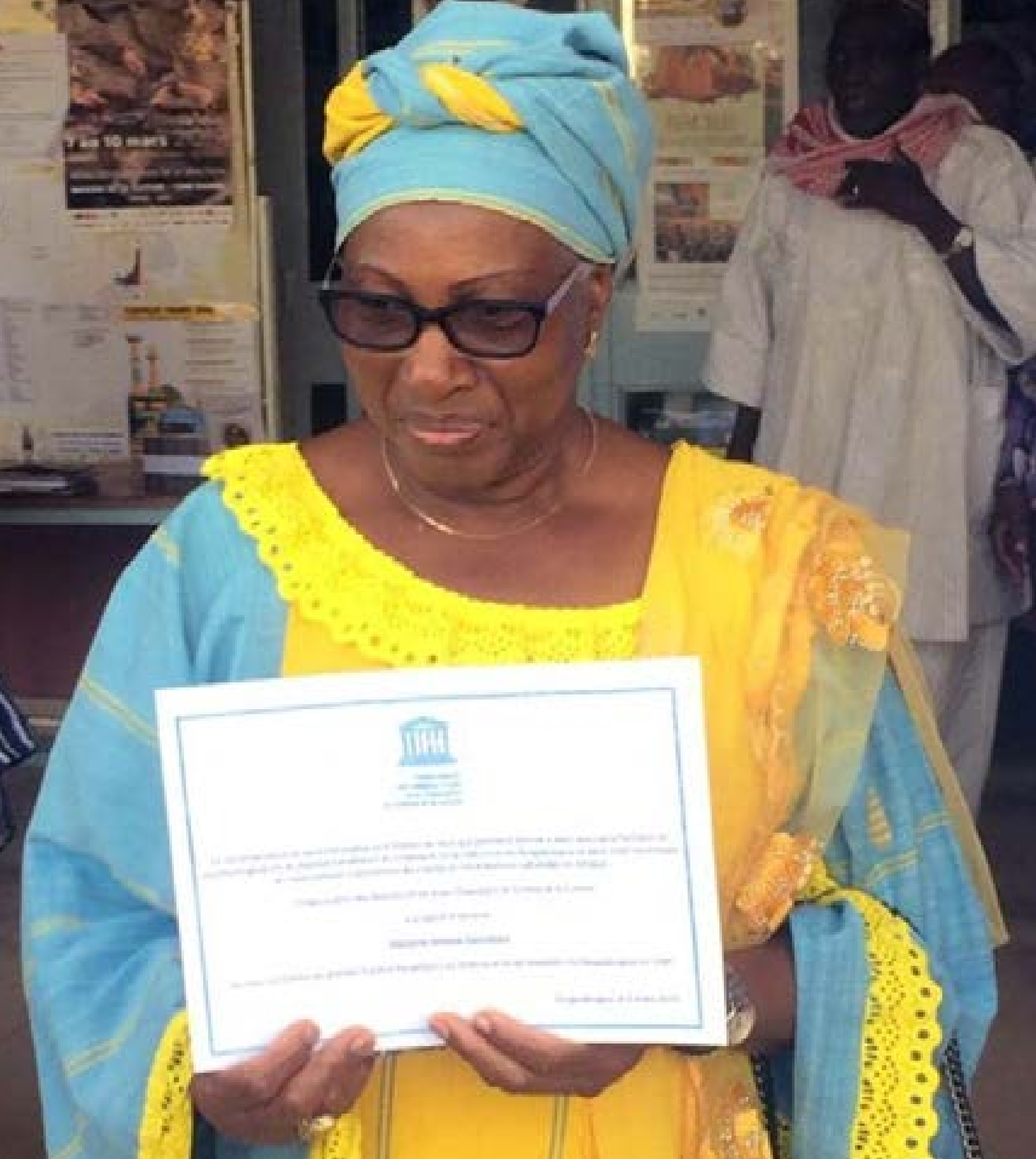
Alimata Salembéré receives an award from UNESCO's general director as a guest of honor in FESPACO 2019

Alimata Salembéré (born 1942) is a Burkinabe film administrator, civil servant and politician. She was a founding member of the film festival FESPACO, and served as its General Secretary from 1982 to 1984. She was a Minister of Culture in Burkina Faso from 1987 to 1991.

== Life ==
Alimata Salembéré was born November 9, 1942, in Bobo-Dioulasso. After gaining a BA in modern literature and a professional degree in television production, she started working for Radio Télévision du Burkina. She was a co-founder of FESPACO in 1969, and president of its first organizing committee.

From 1976 to 1980 Salembéré was a press officer at the African and Malagasy Common Organization (OCAM). From 1982 to 1984 she was secretary general of FESPACO, and from 1983 to 1986 she was press secretary at the Burkina Faso Embassy in Paris. She was appointed secretary general of the Ministry of Information from 1986 to 1987, and Minister of Culture from 1987 to 1991. From 1992 to 1999 she was Director General of the Agency of Cultural and Technical Cooperation (ACCT).
