= Cassole =

Conical earthenware container

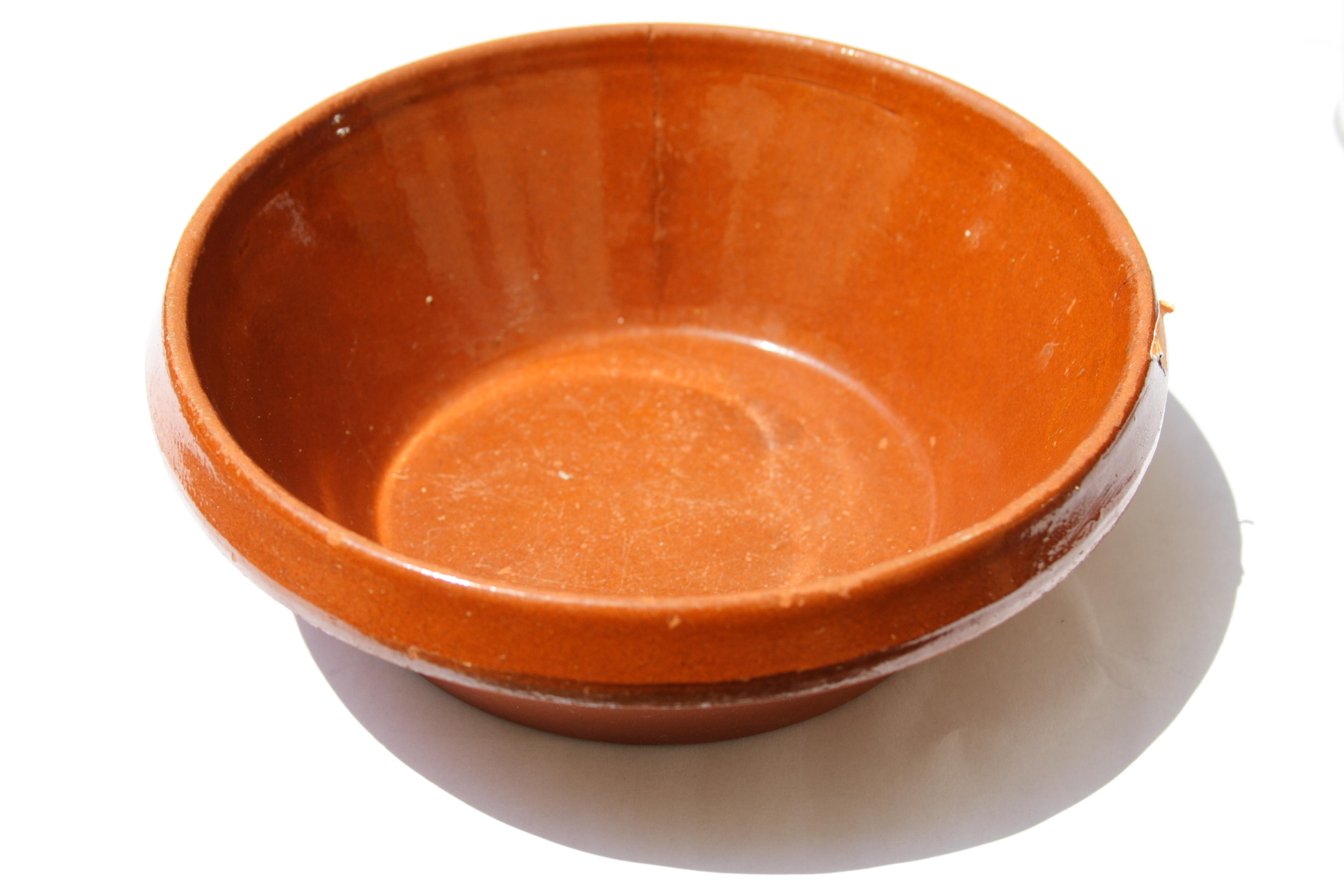
French cassole

A cassole (Occitan: cassolo) is a conical earthenware container, glazed inside. The bowl is made from red clay and is noted for its capacity to retain heat.

Cassole originated from the French form of the Occitan word cassolo. The earthenware was first made at Issel, near Castelnaudary, France. It is constructed as a deep bowl with a wide mouth and narrow bottom. A cassole often features a unique design etched into its body. The famous French casserole dish called cassoulet derived its name from the bowl.

Cassoles are still made in the traditional way at Issel. Particularly, Poterie Not Freres is identified as the single enterprise that continues to produce the bowls, which are crafted by hand.

== See also ==
- Beanpot
- French tian
- Güveç
- Tangia
