= Ratatouille (film) =

2007 film by Brad Bird

- Theatrical release poster
- Directed by: Brad Bird
- Screenplay by: Brad Bird
- Story by: Jan Pinkava; Jim Capobianco; Brad Bird
- Produced by: Brad Lewis
- Starring: Patton Oswalt; Lou Romano; Ian Holm; Brad Garrett; Peter O'Toole; Janeane Garofalo; Brian Dennehy; Peter Sohn
- Cinematography: Sharon Calahan; Robert Anderson
- Edited by: Darren T. Holmes
- Music by: Michael Giacchino
- Production company: Pixar Animation Studios
- Distributed by: Buena Vista Pictures Distribution (Note: Distributed under the Walt Disney Pictures banner.)
- Release dates: June 22, 2007 (Kodak Theatre); June 29, 2007 (United States)
- Running time: 111 minutes
- Country: United States
- Language: English
- Budget: $150 million
- Box office: $623.7 million

Ratatouille (/ˌrætəˈtuːi/ RAT-ə-TOO-ee) is a 2007 American animated comedy-drama film written and directed by Brad Bird, from a story by Jan Pinkava, Jim Capobianco and Bird. Produced by Pixar Animation Studios for Walt Disney Pictures, the film stars the voices of Patton Oswalt, Lou Romano, Ian Holm, Janeane Garofalo, Peter O'Toole, Brian Dennehy, Peter Sohn and Brad Garrett. The title refers to the French dish ratatouille, and also references the species of the main character, a rat. Set mostly in Paris, the plot follows a young rat Remy (Oswalt) who dreams of becoming a chef at Auguste Gusteau's (Garrett) restaurant and tries to achieve his goal by forming an unlikely alliance with the restaurant's garbage boy Alfredo Linguini (Romano).

Development for Ratatouille began in 2000 when Pinkava wrote the original concepts of the film, although he was never formally named the director of the film. In 2005, following Pinkava's departure from Pixar for lacking confidence in the story development, Bird was approached to direct the film and revise the story. Bird and some of the film's crew members also visited Paris for inspiration. To create the food animation used in the film, the crew consulted chefs from both France and the United States. Producer Brad Lewis interned at Thomas Keller's The French Laundry restaurant, where Keller developed the confit byaldi, a dish used in the film. Michael Giacchino composed the Paris-inspired music for the film.

Ratatouille premiered on June 22, 2007, at the Kodak Theatre in Los Angeles, California, with its general release on June 29, in the United States. The film became a critical and commercial success, grossing $623.7 million worldwide. It finished its theatrical run as the sixth highest-grossing film of 2007 and the year's second highest-grossing animated film (behind Shrek the Third). The film received widespread acclaim for its screenplay, animation, humor, voice acting, and Giacchino's score. It also won the Academy Award for Best Animated Feature and was nominated for several more, including Best Original Screenplay. Ratatouille was later voted one of the hundred greatest motion pictures of the 21st century by a 2016 poll of international critics conducted by the BBC.

== Plot ==
Remy, a young anthropomorphic rat with heightened senses of taste and smell, dreams of becoming a chef like his human idol, the late Auguste Gusteau. Conversely, the rest of his colony, including his older brother Émile and their father, Django, the clan leader, only eat for sustenance and are wary of humans. The rats live in an elderly woman's attic outside Paris, but when the woman discovers them, Remy becomes separated from the others during their hasty evacuation. Encouraged by an imaginary Gusteau, he explores until he finds himself on the roof of Gusteau's namesake restaurant.

Remy sees the restaurant's new garbage boy, Alfredo Linguini, struggling to fix a leek soup he ruined. Remy sneaks in and improves the soup; Linguini notices and traps Remy while keeping his presence secret from Skinner, Gusteau's former sous-chef and the restaurant's new owner and head chef. Skinner confronts Linguini about the soup, but it is served by accident and unexpectedly becomes a hit. Colette Tatou, the restaurant's only female chef, persuades Skinner to keep Linguini and support Gusteau's motto, "Anyone can cook." Skinner demands Linguini replicate the soup but spots Remy, ordering Linguini to take him outside and kill him. Alone, Linguini realizes Remy understands him and persuades Remy to assist with cooking.

Remy discovers that he can control Linguini's movements like a marionette by pulling on his hair while hiding under his toque. They recreate the soup and continue cooking at the restaurant. Colette begrudgingly trains Linguini but steadily appreciates him heeding her advice. Later, Remy reunites with his clan. After Remy tells Django that he intends to stay at the restaurant, Django shows him a group of exterminated rats to convince him that humans are dangerous, but Remy defies his warnings and leaves.

Meanwhile, Skinner is shocked and enraged to discover through a letter from Linguini's late mother that Gusteau is Linguini's father, making him the rightful owner of the restaurant. After Skinner's lawyer verifies that Linguini is Gusteau's son, Skinner hides the evidence in an envelope; Remy steals the envelope and brings it to Linguini. Skinner is fired and Linguini is promoted to head chef. The restaurant thrives as Remy's recipes become popular, and Linguini develops a romantic relationship with Colette. Food critic Anton Ego, who negatively reviewed the restaurant shortly before Gusteau's death, announces to Linguini that he will review the restaurant again the following day. After Linguini takes credit for Remy's cooking at a press conference, he and Remy have a falling out. As revenge, Remy leads his clan on a raid of the restaurant's pantries. Linguini arrives to apologize, but upon discovering the raid, he furiously expels Remy and his clan from the restaurant.

The next day, Skinner captures Remy, who is quickly freed by Django and Émile. After returning to the restaurant, he and Linguini reconcile, and Linguini reveals Remy and his cooking techniques to his staff, who all immediately quit. Django, impressed by Remy's grit, summons the clan to help him cook while Linguini waits tables. Reminded of Gusteau's motto, Colette returns to help. Skinner and a health inspector attempt to interfere, but the rats tie them up, gag them and lock them in the pantry.

Remy prepares confit byaldi, a variation of ratatouille, which evokes in Ego a sudden and involuntary recollection of his childhood and of his mother's cooking. Astonished and delighted, Ego asks to meet the chef and – once all other guests are gone – is stunned when introduced to Remy. The next day, he writes a glowing review, stating that he has come to understand Gusteau's motto and praising Remy without revealing that he is a rat. After Skinner and the health inspector are released and expose the rat infestation, Gusteau's is shut down, costing Ego his job and reputation. Remy, Linguini, and Colette open a bistro called La Ratatouille, which a now-happier Ego invests in and frequents. The rat colony settles into the bistro's attic as their new home.

== Voice cast ==
- Patton Oswalt as Remy, a rat who has an excellent sense of smell and taste. Director Brad Bird chose Oswalt after hearing his food-related comedy routine.
- Lou Romano as Alfredo Linguini
- Ian Holm as Skinner. His behavior, small size, and body language are loosely based on Louis de Funès. The character was named after the psychologist B. F. Skinner.
- Brian Dennehy as Django, Remy and Émile’s father and leader of the rat colony.
- Peter Sohn as Émile, Remy's brother.
- Peter O'Toole as Anton Ego, whose appearance was inspired by Louis Jouvet.
- Brad Garrett as Auguste Gusteau. He was inspired by real-life chef Bernard Loiseau, who died after his restaurant, La Côte d'Or, was rumored to be losing a Michelin star. La Côte d'Or was one of the restaurants visited by Brad Bird and others in France. Gusteau was also inspired by chef Paul Bocuse for the character traits.
- Janeane Garofalo as Colette Tatou, Gusteau's rôtisseur, inspired by French chef Hélène Darroze
- Will Arnett as Horst, Skinner's German sous chef who changes his backstory every time he is asked
- Julius Callahan as Lalo, Gusteau's Haitian saucier and poissonnier
  - Callahan also voices François, the advertising executive handling the marketing of Skinner's microwaveable food under Gusteau's name
- James Remar as Larousse, Gusteau's garde manger
- John Ratzenberger as Mustafa, Gusteau's chef de salle
- Teddy Newton as Talon Labarthe, Skinner's lawyer
- Tony Fucile as Patrick Pompidou, Gusteau's pâtissier
  - Fucile also voices Nadar Lessard, the health inspector. In the UK version, Lessard is voiced by Jamie Oliver.
- Jake Steinfeld as Git, a former lab rat and member of Django's colony
- Brad Bird as Ambrister Minion, Ego's butler
- Stéphane Roux as TV narrator

== Production ==
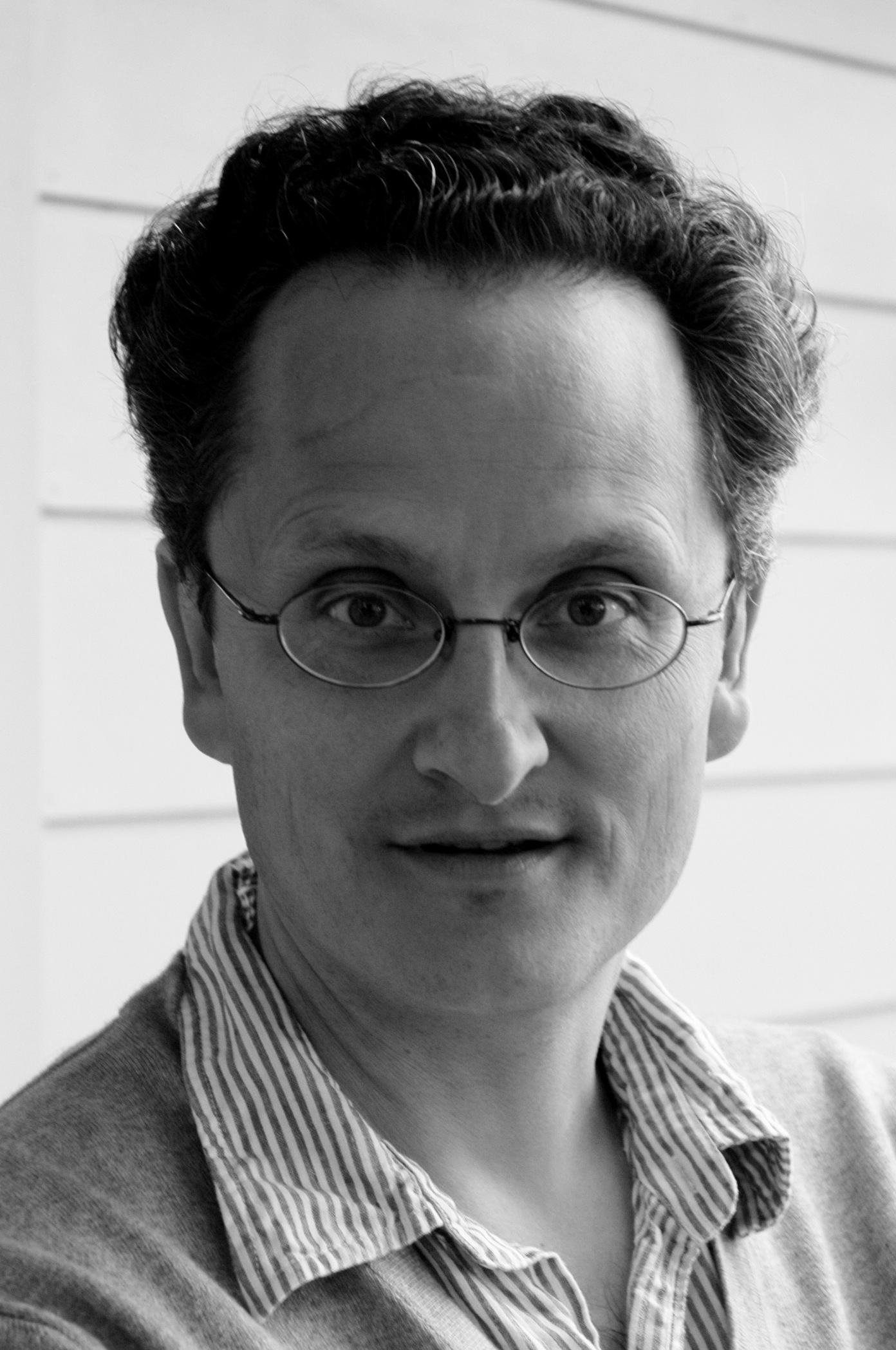
Jan Pinkava (pictured) conceived the idea for the film in 2000.

Jan Pinkava came up with the concept in 2000, creating the original design, sets and characters and core storyline, but he was never formally named the director of the film. By 2004, Pixar added Bob Peterson as a co-director and he was given exclusive control of the story. After three months and lacking confidence in the story development, Pixar management turned to The Incredibles director Brad Bird to direct the film, just as Pinkava departed Pixar in 2005 (although he retained a story credit on the film) while Peterson left the film to return to work on Up. Bird was attracted to the film because of the outlandishness of the concept and the conflict that drove it: that kitchen feared rats, yet a rat wanted to work in one. Bird was also delighted that the film could be made a highly physical comedy, with the character of Linguini providing endless fun for the animators. Bird rewrote the story, with a change in emphasis. He killed off Gusteau, gave larger roles to Skinner and Colette, and also changed the appearance of the rats to be less anthropomorphic.

Because Ratatouille is intended to be a romantic, lush vision of Paris, giving it an identity distinct from the studio's previous films, director Brad Bird, producer Brad Lewis and some of the crew spent a week in the city to properly understand its environment, taking a motorcycle tour and eating at five top restaurants. There are also many water-based sequences in the film, one of which is set in the sewers and is more complex than the blue whale scene in Finding Nemo. One scene has Linguini wet after jumping into the Seine to fetch Remy. A Pixar employee (Shade/Paint department coordinator Kesten Migdal) jumped into Pixar's swimming pool wearing a chef's uniform and apron to see which parts of the suit stuck to his body and which became translucent from water absorption.

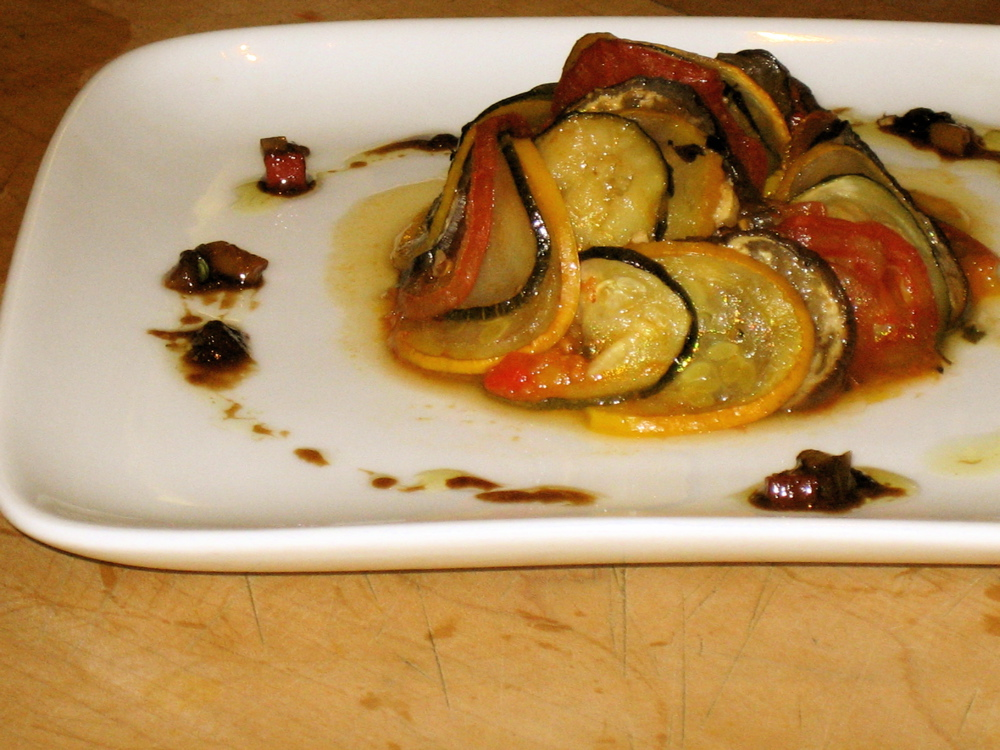
The film's take on the traditional ratatouille dish was suggested by gourmet chef Thomas Keller, a variation known as confit byaldi.

A challenge for the filmmakers was creating computer-generated images of food that would appear delicious. Gourmet chefs in both the U.S. and France were consulted, and animators attended cooking classes at San Francisco-area culinary schools to understand the workings of a commercial kitchen. Sets/Layout department manager Michael Warch, a culinary-academy-trained professional chef before working at Pixar, helped teach and consult animators as they worked. He also prepared dishes used by the Art, Shade/Paint, Effects and Sets Modeling departments. Renowned chef Thomas Keller allowed producer Brad Lewis to intern in his French Laundry kitchen. For the film's climax, Keller suggested a fancy, layered version of the title dish for the rat characters to cook, called "confit byaldi". The same sub-surface light scattering technique that was used on the skin in The Incredibles was used on fruits and vegetables, while new programs gave an organic texture and movement to the food. Completing the illusion were music, dialogue, and abstract imagery representing the characters' mental sensations while appreciating food. The visual flavor metaphors were created by animator Michel Gagné inspired by the work of Oskar Fischinger and Norman McLaren. To create a realistic compost pile, the Art Department photographed fifteen different kinds of produce, such as apples, berries, bananas, mushrooms, oranges, broccoli, and lettuce, in the process of rotting.

The cast members strove to make their French accents authentic yet understandable. John Ratzenberger notes that he often segued into an Italian accent. Ian Holm was cast as the character of Skinner after Bird saw him in The Lord of the Rings trilogy. According to Pixar designer Jason Deamer, "Most of the characters were designed while Jan [Pinkava] was still directing… He has a real eye for sculpture." According to Pinkava, the critic Anton Ego was designed to resemble a vulture. To save time, human characters were designed and animated without toes. Dana Carvey was originally approached for a role but he declined as he was busy raising kids.

Rat expert Debbie Ducommun, also known as the "Rat Lady", was consulted on rat habits and characteristics. Along with Ducommun's insight a vivarium containing pet rats sat in a hallway for more than a year so animators could study the movement of the animals' fur, noses, ears, paws, and tails as they ran. Promotional material for Intel credits their platform for a 30 percent performance improvement in rendering software. They used Ratatouille in some of their marketing materials. The film was animated with traditional techniques rather than motion capture, as stated in a "Quality Assurance Guarantee" at the end of the credits. Although it was initially believed that Pixar included the "guarantee" as a reminder to the Academy after Cars lost the Academy Award for Best Animated Feature to Happy Feet, which used mocap technology, Bird claimed that the "guarantee" was unrelated to Cars's Oscar loss and that it was his idea to include it as he felt there was a trend of using real-time performance capture in animated films instead of the frame by frame methodology he "love[s] & was proud that we had used on Ratatouille."

== Soundtrack ==
Ratatouille is the second Pixar film to be scored by Michael Giacchino after The Incredibles. It is also the second Pixar film not to be scored by Randy or Thomas Newman. The scores feature a wide range of instrumentation and are influenced by various music genres. Giacchino wrote two themes for Remy, one about him with the rat colony and the other about his hopes and dreams. He also wrote a buddy theme for both Remy and Linguini that plays when they are together. In addition to the score, Giacchino wrote the main theme song, "Le Festin", about Remy and his dream to be a chef. French artist Camille (who was 29 at the time of the film's release) was hired to perform "Le Festin" after Giacchino listened to her music and realized she was perfect for the song; as a result, the song is sung in French in almost all versions of the film. The soundtrack album was released by Walt Disney Records on June 26, 2007.

Ratatouille (Original Motion Picture Soundtrack) track listing

No.	Title	Length
1.	"Le Festin" (performed by Camille)	2:50
2.	"Welcome to Gusteau's"	0:38
3.	"This Is Me"	1:41
4.	"Granny Get Your Gun"	2:01
5.	"100 Rat Dash"	1:47
6.	"Wall Rat"	2:41
7.	"Cast of Cooks"	1:41
8.	"A Real Gourmet Kitchen"	4:18
9.	"Souped Up"	0:50
10.	"Is It Soup Yet?"	1:16
11.	"A New Deal"	1:56
12.	"Remy Drives a Linguini"	2:26
13.	"Colette Shows Him le Ropes"	2:56
14.	"Special Order"	1:58
15.	"Kiss & Vinegar"	1:54
16.	"Losing Control"	2:04
17.	"Heist to See You"	1:45
18.	"The Paper Chase"	1:44
19.	"Remy's Revenge"	3:24
20.	"Abandoning Ship"	2:55
21.	"Dinner Rush"	5:00
22.	"Anyone Can Cook"	3:13
23.	"End Creditouilles"	9:16
24.	"Ratatouille Main Theme"	2:09
Total length:		62:23

== Release ==
=== Theatrical ===
Ratatouille was initially scheduled for release on June 9, 2006, but was later pushed back to June 29, 2007. This shift was reportedly made to accommodate the 2006 date for Cars. Ratatouille's world premiere was on June 22, 2007, at Los Angeles' Kodak Theatre. The commercial release was one week later, with the short film Lifted preceding Ratatouille in theaters. Earlier in the year, it had received an Academy Award nomination. A test screening of the film was shown at the Harkins Cine Capri Theater in Scottsdale, Arizona on June 16, 2007, at which a Pixar representative was present to collect viewer feedback. Disney CEO Bob Iger announced an upcoming theatrical re-release of the film in 3D at the Disney shareholders meeting in March 2014.

=== Marketing ===
The trailer for Ratatouille debuted on June 9, 2006, with the release of Cars, its immediate predecessor. It depicts an original scene where Remy is caught red-handed on the cheese trolley in the restaurant's dining area, sampling the cheese and barely escaping the establishment, intercut with separate scenes of the rat explaining directly to the audience why he is taking such risks. Similar to most of Pixar's teaser trailers, the scene was not present in the final film release. A second trailer was released on March 23, 2007. The Ratatouille Big Cheese Tour began on May 11, 2007, with cooking demonstrations and a film preview. Voice actor Lou Romano attended the San Francisco leg of the tour for autograph signings.

The front label of the planned Ratatouille wine to have been promoted by Disney, Pixar, and Costco, and subsequently recalled for its use of a cartoon character.

Disney and Pixar were working to bring a French-produced Ratatouille-branded wine to Costco stores in August 2007, but abandoned plans because of complaints from the California Wine Institute, citing standards in labelling that restrict the use of cartoon characters to avoid attracting under-age drinkers. Moreover, both companies faced other challenges trying to lure audiences, as several stores had been overflowing with merchandise themed to other newly released films like Spider-Man 3, Shrek the Third and Transformers, making it harder to persuade parents to spend an additional cost between $7.99 to $19.99 on a plush rat.

In the United Kingdom, in place of releasing a theatrical trailer, a commercial featuring Remy and Emile was released in cinemas before its release to discourage obtaining unlicensed copies of films. Also, in the United Kingdom, the main characters were used for a commercial for the Nissan Note, with Remy and Emile watching an original commercial for it made for the "Surprisingly Spacious" ad campaign and also parodying it, respectively.

Disney/Pixar was concerned that audiences, particularly children, would not be familiar with the word "ratatouille" and its pronunciation. As a result, the title was spelled phonetically (as "rat-a-too-e") within trailers and on posters. For similar reasons, in the American release of the film, on-screen text in French was printed in English, such as the title of Gusteau's cookbook and the sign telling kitchen staff to wash their hands, although in international versions, such as the British English release and the US Spanish-language DVD release, these are rendered in French. In Canada, the film was released theatrically with text in English: on DVD, the majority of the text (including Gusteau's will) was in French.

=== Home media ===
Ratatouille was released by Walt Disney Studios Home Entertainment on Blu-ray and DVD in North America on November 6, 2007. A new animated short film featuring Remy and Emile entitled Your Friend the Rat was included as a special feature, in which the two rats attempt to entreat the viewer, a human, to welcome rats as their friends, demonstrating the benefits and misconceptions of rats towards humanity through several historical examples. The eleven-minute short uses 3-D animation, 2-D animation, live-action and stop-motion animation, a first for Pixar.

The disc also includes a CGI short entitled Lifted, which was screened before the film during its theatrical run. It depicts an adolescent extraterrestrial attempting to abduct a sleeping human. Throughout the sequence, he is graded by an adult extraterrestrial in a manner reminiscent of a driver's licensing exam road test. The entire short contains no dialogue, which is typical of Pixar Shorts not based on existing properties. Also included among the special features are deleted scenes, a featurette featuring Brad Bird discussing filmmaking and chef Thomas Keller discussing culinary creativity entitled "Fine Food and Film", and four easter eggs. Although the Region A Blu-ray edition has a French audio track, the Region 1 DVD does not, except for some copies sold in Canada.

The DVD release on November 6, 2007, earned 4,919,574 units (equivalent to US$73,744,414) in its first week (November 6–11, 2007), during which it topped the DVD charts, beating out Spider-Man 3 and I Now Pronounce You Chuck & Larry. In total, it sold 12,531,266 units (US$189,212,532) becoming the second-best-selling animated DVD of 2007, both in units sold and sales revenue, behind Happy Feet. In 2014, the film was re-rendered in 3D and in July of that year was released on Blu-ray 3D in the UK, France, and India. In 2019, Ratatouille was released on 4K Ultra HD Blu-ray.

== Reception ==
=== Box office ===
In its opening weekend in North America, Ratatouille opened in 3,940 theaters and debuted at number one with $47.2 million, the lowest Pixar opening since A Bug's Life in 1998. When the film opened, it topped the box office ahead of 20th Century Fox's Live Free or Die Hard. Ratatouille was the first non-sequel film to reach the number one spot since Disturbia debuted two months earlier. The film only stayed in its position for a few days before being taken by Transformers. In France, where the film is set, the film broke the record for the biggest debut for an animated film and dethroned Titanic for the most consecutive weeks at the top of the box office. In the United Kingdom, the film debuted at number one with sales over £4 million. The film grossed $206.4 million in the United States and Canada and a total of $623.7 million worldwide, making it the seventh-highest-grossing Pixar film.

=== Critical response ===
The review aggregator website Rotten Tomatoes reported a 96% approval rating with an average rating of 8.5/10 based on 251 reviews. The site's consensus reads: "Fast-paced and stunningly animated, Ratatouille adds another delightfully entertaining entry—and a rather unlikely hero—to the Pixar canon." On Metacritic, it has a weighted average score of 96 out of 100 based on 37 reviews, the highest of any Pixar film (tied with Toy Story), and the 46th highest-rated film on the site. Audiences surveyed by CinemaScore gave the film a grade "A" on scale of A+ to F. In 2025, it ranked number 73 on The New York Times' list of "The 100 Best Movies of the 21st Century" and number 58 on the "Readers' Choice" edition of the list.

A. O. Scott of The New York Times called Ratatouille "a nearly flawless piece of popular art, as well as one of the most persuasive portraits of an artist ever committed to film"; echoing the character Anton Ego in the film, he ended his review with a simple "thank you" to the creators of the film. Wally Hammond of Time Out gave the film five out of five stars, saying "A test for tiny tots, a mite nostalgic and as male-dominated as a modern kitchen it may be, but these are mere quibbles about this delightful addition to the Pixar pantheon." Andrea Gronvall of the Chicago Reader gave the film a positive review, saying "Brad Bird's second collaboration with Pixar is more ambitious and meditative than his Oscar-winning The Incredibles." Owen Gleiberman of Entertainment Weekly gave the film a B, saying "Ratatouille has the Pixar technical magic without, somehow, the full Pixar flavor. It's Brad Bird's genial dessert, not so much incredible as merely sweetly edible." Peter Travers of Rolling Stone gave the film three-and-a-half stars out of four, saying "What makes Ratatouille such a hilarious and heartfelt wonder is the way Bird contrives to let it sneak up on you. And get a load of that score from Michael Giacchino, a perfect complement to a delicious meal." James Berardinelli of ReelViews gave the film three out of four stars, saying "For parents looking to spend time in a theater with their kids or adults who want something lighter and less testosterone-oriented than the usual summer fare, Ratatouille offers a savory main course." Christy Lemire of the Associated Press gave the film a positive review, saying "Ratatouille is free of the kind of gratuitous pop-culture references that plague so many movies of the genre; it tells a story, it's very much of our world but it never goes for the cheap, easy gag." Justin Chang of Variety gave the film a positive review, saying "The master chefs at Pixar have blended all the right ingredients—abundant verbal and visual wit, genius slapstick timing, a soupcon of Gallic sophistication—to produce a warm and irresistible concoction."

Michael Phillips of the Chicago Tribune gave the film four out of four stars, saying "The film may be animated, and largely taken up with rats, but its pulse is gratifyingly human. And you have never seen a computer-animated feature with this sort of visual panache and detail." Rafer Guzman of Newsday gave the film three out of four stars, saying "So many computer-animated movies are brash, loud and popping with pop-culture comedy, but Ratatouille has the warm glow of a favorite book. The characters are more than the sum of their gigabyte-consuming parts – they feel handcrafted." Roger Moore of the Orlando Sentinel gave the film three out of five stars, saying "Has Pixar lost its magic recipe? Ratatouille is filled with fairly generic animated imagery, a few modest chases, a couple of good gags, not a lot of laughs." Scott Foundas of LA Weekly gave the film a positive review, saying "Bird has taken the raw ingredients of an anthropomorphic-animal kiddie matinee and whipped them into a heady brew about nothing less than the principles of artistic creation." Colin Covert of the Star Tribune gave the film four out of four stars, saying "It's not just the computer animation that is vibrantly three-dimensional. It's also the well-rounded characters ... I defy you to name another animated film so overflowing with superfluous beauty." Steven Rea of The Philadelphia Inquirer gave the film three-and-a-half stars out of four, saying "With Ratatouille, Bird once again delivers not just a great, witty story, but dazzling visuals as well." Bill Muller of The Arizona Republic gave the film four-and-a-half stars out of five, saying "Like the burbling soup that plays a key part in Ratatouille, the movie is a delectable blend of ingredients that tickles the palette and leaves you hungry for more."

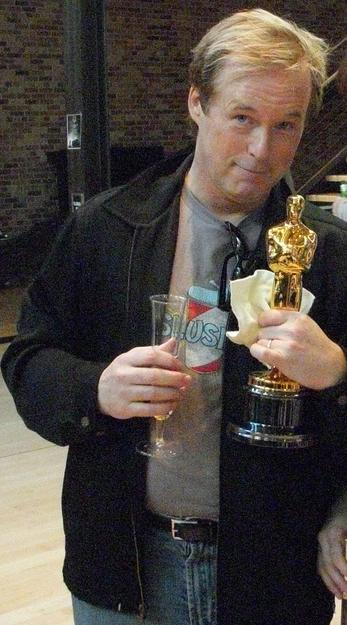
Brad Bird with his second Academy Award for Best Animated Feature

Rene Rodriguez of the Miami Herald gave the film three out of four stars, saying "Ratatouille is the most straightforward and formulaic picture to date from Pixar Animation Studios, but it is also among the most enchanting and touching." Jack Mathews of the New York Daily News gave the film four out of four stars, saying "The Pixar magic continues with Brad Bird's Ratatouille, a gorgeous, wonderfully inventive computer-animated comedy." Anthony Venutolo of NJ Advance Media gave the film three out of four stars, saying "Fresh family fun. Although there are those slightly noxious images of rodents scampering around a kitchen, the movie doesn't stoop to kid-pandering jokes based on backtalk and bodily gases." David Ansen of Newsweek gave the film a positive review, saying "A film as rich as a sauce béarnaise, as refreshing as a raspberry sorbet, and a lot less predictable than the damn food metaphors and adjectives all us critics will churn out to describe it. OK, one more and then I'll be done: it's yummy." Peter Hartlaub of the San Francisco Chronicle gave the film four out of four stars, saying "Ratatouille never overwhelms, even though it's stocked with action, romance, historical content, family drama and serious statements about the creation of art." Richard Corliss of Time gave the film a positive review, saying "From the moment Remy enters, crashing, to the final happy fadeout, Ratatouille parades the brio and depth that set Pixar apart from and above other animation studios." Roger Ebert of the Chicago Sun-Times gave the film four out of four stars, saying "A lot of animated movies have inspired sequels, notably Shrek, but Brad Bird's Ratatouille is the first one that made me positively desire one." Peter Howell of the Toronto Star gave the film four out of four stars, saying "Had Bird gone the safe route, he would have robbed us of a great new cartoon figure in Remy, who like the rest of the film is rendered with animation that is at once fanciful and life-like. It's also my pick for Pixar's best."

Joe Morgenstern of The Wall Street Journal gave the film a positive review, saying "The characters are irresistible, the animation is astonishing and the film, a fantasy version of a foodie rhapsody, sustains a level of joyous invention that hasn't been seen in family entertainment since The Incredibles." Kenneth Turan of the Los Angeles Times gave the film four-and-a-half stars out of five, saying "Brad Bird's Ratatouille is so audacious you have to fall in love with its unlikely hero." Claudia Puig of USA Today gave the film three-and-a-half stars out of four, saying "Ratatouille is delicious fun sure to be savored by audiences of all ages for its sumptuous visuals, clever wit and irresistibly inspiring tale." Miriam Di Nunzio of the Chicago Sun-Times gave the film three-and-a-half stars out of four, saying "Ratatouille will make you wonder why animation needs to hide behind the mantle of 'it's for children, but grownups will like it, too.' This one's for Mom and Dad, and yep, the kids will like it, too." Michael Booth of The Denver Post gave the film three-and-a-half stars out of four, saying "Writer and director Brad Bird keeps Ratatouille moving without resorting to the cute animal jokes or pop-culture wisecracking that ruined so many other recent animated films." Tom Long of The Detroit News gave the film an A, saying "Ratatouille has the technical genius, emotional core and storytelling audacity to lift it into the ranks of [the best] Pixar films, the crème de la crème of modern animation." Liam Lacey of The Globe and Mail gave the film three-and-a-half stars out of four, saying "No sketchy backgrounds here—Ratatouille's scenes feel like deep-focus camera shots. The textures, from the gleam of copper pans to the cobblestone streets, are almost palpable." Desson Thomson of The Washington Post gave the film a positive review, saying "Ratatouille doesn't center on the over-familiar surfaces of contemporary life. It harks back to Disney's older era when cartoons seemed part of a more elegant world with less edgy characters."

In 2011, celebrity chef Anthony Bourdain praised the film, saying "It's a measure of how deficient Hollywood has been in making an accurate restaurant-food based film that far and away the best was about an animated rat. They got the food, the reactions to food, and tiny details to food really right – down to the barely noticeable pink burns on one of the character's forearms."

=== Accolades ===
Ratatouille won the Academy Award for Best Animated Feature at the 80th Academy Awards and was nominated for four others: Best Original Score, Best Sound Editing, Best Sound Mixing, Best Original Screenplay. With five Oscar nominations, the film broke the record for an animated feature film, surpassing the four nominations each of Aladdin, Monsters, Inc., Finding Nemo, and The Incredibles. As of 2013, Ratatouille is tied with Up and Toy Story 3 for the second-most Oscar nominations for an animated film, behind Beauty and the Beast and WALL-E (six).

Furthermore, Ratatouille was nominated for 13 Annie Awards including twice in the Best Animated Effects, where it lost to Surf's Up, and three times in the Best Voice Acting in an Animated Feature Production for Janeane Garofalo, Ian Holm, and Patton Oswalt, where Ian Holm won the award. It won the Best Animated Feature Award from multiple associations including the Chicago Film Critics, the National Board of Review, the Annie Awards, the Broadcast Film Critics, the British Academy of Film and Television (BAFTA), and the Golden Globes. In 2021, members of Writers Guild of America West (WGAW) and Writers Guild of America, East (WGAE) voted the film's screenplay 95th in WGA’s 101 Greatest Screenplays of the 21st Century.

== Legacy ==
=== Video game ===
A primary video game adaptation of the film, titled Ratatouille, was released on June 26, 2007 for Xbox 360, Wii, PlayStation 2, GameCube, Xbox, Game Boy Advance, Nintendo DS, PlayStation Portable, Microsoft Windows, Mac OS X, Java ME, and mobile phones. A PlayStation 3 version was released on October 23, 2007. A Nintendo DS-exclusive game, titled Ratatouille: Food Frenzy, was released in October 2007. Ratatouille is also among the films represented in Kinect Rush: A Disney-Pixar Adventure, released in March 2012 for Xbox 360.

Remy is featured in the video game Kingdom Hearts III. He appears as the head chef for Scrooge McDuck's bistro and participates with Sora in cooking minigames. He is addressed only as "Little Chef" in the game, as he does not speak and cannot reveal his name to the characters. Remy, Linguini, and Colette appear as playable characters in the world builder game Disney Magic Kingdoms, in addition to attractions based on Gusteau's Kitchen and Remy's Ratatouille Adventure. In the game, the characters are involved in new storylines that serve as a continuation of the events of the film. In the video game Disney Dreamlight Valley, Remy appears as one of the characters that the player meets during the progress of the story, being the owner of the valley's restaurant, Chez Remy.

=== Theme park attraction ===
A Disney theme park attraction based on the film has been constructed in Walt Disney Studios Park, Disneyland Paris. Ratatouille: L'Aventure Totalement Toquée de Rémy is based upon scenes from the film and uses trackless ride technology. In the attraction, riders "shrink down to the size of a rat". At the 2017 D23 Expo, Disney announced the attraction would be built at the France Pavilion in Epcot's World Showcase which opened on October 1, 2021, during the 50th anniversary of Walt Disney World and the 39th anniversary of Epcot.

=== Unofficial musical ===
In late 2020, users of the social media app TikTok crowdsourced the creation of a musical based on the film. A virtual concert presentation of it, produced by Seaview Productions, streamed for 72 hours on TodayTix beginning January 1, 2021 to benefit The Actors Fund in response to the COVID-19 pandemic. It is directed by Six co-creator and co-director Lucy Moss from a script adaptation by Michael Breslin and Patrick Foley, both of whom co-executive produced the concert with Jeremy O. Harris. The cast included Kevin Chamberlin as Gusteau, Andrew Barth Feldman as Linguini, Tituss Burgess as Remy, Adam Lambert as Emile, Wayne Brady as Django, Priscilla Lopez as Mabel, Ashley Park as Colette, André De Shields as Anton Ego, Owen Tabaka as young Anton Ego, and Mary Testa as Skinner. The concert raised over $1.9 million for The Actors Fund.

=== Ratatoing ===
If magazine described Ratatoing, a 2007 Brazilian computer graphics cartoon by Vídeo Brinquedo, as a "ripoff" of Ratatouille. Marco Aurélio Canônico of the Brazilian newspaper Folha de S.Paulo described Ratatoing as a derivative of Ratatouille. Canônico discussed whether Ratatoing was similar enough to Ratatouille to warrant a lawsuit for copyright violation. The Brazilian Ministry of Culture posted Marco Aurélio Canônico's article on its website. To date no sources have been found to indicate that Pixar took legal action.

=== References in popular culture ===
The film has often been referenced in popular culture since its release, being mentioned or parodied on shows such as Saturday Night Live, My Name Is Earl, The Simpsons, Breaking Bad, Key & Peele, Robot Chicken, Orange Is the New Black, Teen Titans Go!, Difficult People, The Good Place, Once Upon a Time, Brooklyn Nine-Nine, and Ted Lasso, as well as in the films The Five-Year Engagement (2012), The Suicide Squad (2021), Teenage Mutant Ninja Turtles: Mutant Mayhem (2023), Zootopia 2 (2025), and in comedian John Mulaney's comedy special New in Town.

A parody of Ratatouille is a significant plot thread in the 2022 science-fiction film Everything Everywhere All at Once. In the middle of the film, the main character Evelyn Quan Wang (Michelle Yeoh) attempts to explain the multiverse and the concept of "verse-jumping" (temporarily linking one's consciousness to another version of themselves in a different universe, and accessing all the emotions, memories, and skills in the process) to her family using the Pixar film as an analogy, only to misremember it as being about a raccoon and being titled Raccacoonie. Later, in one of several parallel universes, Evelyn is a teppanyaki chef who works with another teppanyaki chef named Chad (Harry Shum Jr.) who is being puppeteered by the anthropomorphic Raccacoonie (voiced by Randy Newman) who is hiding under Chad's chef hat, much like Remy and Linguini; during the film's climactic montage, Evelyn exposes Raccacoonie and he is taken away by animal control, before she has a change of heart and helps Chad rescue Raccacoonie. Reportedly inspired by producer Jonathan Wang's father's habit of misremembering the names of popular films, the running joke was described by IGN as "one of the film's highlights", while Alison Herman of The Ringer noted a thematic resonance as both films were about "the virtues of creativity within material constraints".

== Future ==
In June 2026, even when Oswalt said he would like to do a sequel, Brad Bird stated that he had no interest in making a sequel and had consistently turned down the idea whenever casually asked by Pixar. Despite this, in August 2026, Pete Docter stated, "We’re always exploring to see what we can do with these characters."

== Works cited ==
- Price, David (2008). The Pixar Touch: The Making of a Company. New York: Alfred A. Knopf. ISBN 978-0-307-26575-3.
