= Sylvestre Amoussou =

Beninese actor turned film director

- Born: 31 December 1964 (age 61); Benin
- Occupations: Actor; Film director
- Known for: Africa Paradis (2006)

Sylvestre Amoussou (born 31 December 1964) is a Beninese film director, actor, producer, and screenwriter, best known for his 2006 film Africa Paradis, a satire on immigration.

== Early life ==
Sylvestre Amoussou was born 31 December 1964 in Benin, later moving to France.

== Career ==
Amoussou was a stage, film, and television actor in France. He had roles in Black Mic-Mac 2 (1988), Elisa (1995), Fantôme avec chauffeur, and Paris selon Moussa (2003).

After living in France for 20 years, and experiencing the lack of interesting roles offered to black actors, Amoussou decided to make his own films. He made several short films before making his first feature film, which was released in 2006. In Africa Paradis, the politics of immigration is turned on its head: the economic fortunes of Europe and Africa are reversed, and immigrants struggle to gain entrance to Africa from Europe.

His 2017 anti-colonial film L'orage africain: un continent sous influence (The African Storm, 2017) received an enthusiastic reception from audiences at the Panafrican Film and Television Festival of Ouagadougou (FEPASCO) and received the festival's Silver Stallion of Yennenga award.

== Selected filmography ==
=== As actor ===
- Black Mic-Mac 2 (1988)
- Elisa (1995)
- Fantôme avec chauffeur
- Paris selon Moussa (2003)
- En place (Represent, 2023)

=== As director ===
- Les Scorpionnes (1997, short film)
- Achille (1999, a series of 3 episodes)
- Africa Paradis le court-métrage (2001, short film)
- L'Argent Sale (2003)
- Africa paradis, 2006 (director)
- Un pas en avant - Les dessous de la corruption (One Step Forward - The Bottom of Corruption, 2011)
- L'orage africain: un continent sous influence (The African Storm, 2017)
