= Confit byaldi =

Variation of ratatouille

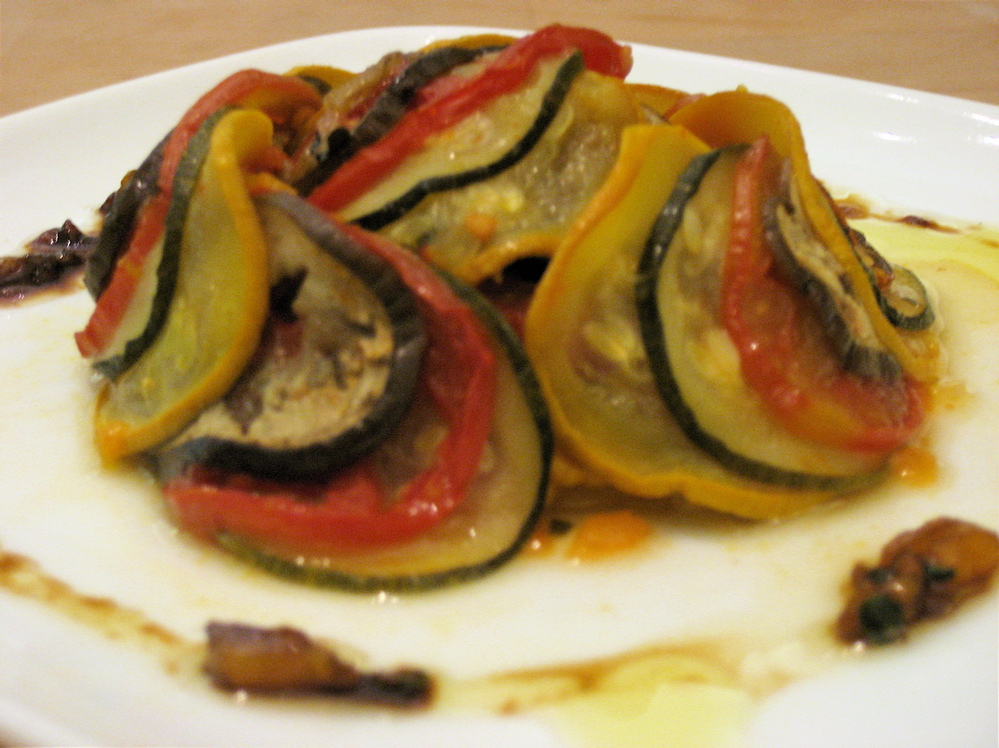
- Type: Main course or side dish
- Main ingredients: Courgette (zucchini), yellow squash, aubergine (eggplant), Roma tomatoes, yellow onions, garlic, herbs

Confit byaldi (French pronunciation: [kɔ̃fi bjaldi]) is a variation on the traditional French dish ratatouille by the French chef Michel Guérard.

== History ==
The name is a play on the Turkish dish "İmam bayıldı", which is a stuffed eggplant.

The original ratatouille recipe has the vegetables fried before baking. Since at least 1976, some French chefs have prepared the ratatouille vegetables in thin slices instead of the traditional rough-cut. Michel Guérard, in his book founding cuisine minceur (1976), recreated lighter versions of the traditional dishes of nouvelle cuisine. His recipe, confit bayaldi, differed from ratatouille by not frying the vegetables, removing peppers and adding mushrooms.

American celebrity chef Thomas Keller first wrote about a dish he called "byaldi" in his 1999 book The French Laundry Cookbook. Keller's variation of Guérard's added two sauces: a tomato and pepper sauce at the bottom (piperade), and a vinaigrette at the top. He served as food consultant to the Pixar film Ratatouille, allowing its producer, Brad Lewis, to shadow for two days in the kitchen of his restaurant, the French Laundry. Lewis asked Keller how he would cook ratatouille if the most famous food critic in the world were to visit his restaurant. Keller decided he would make the ratatouille in confit byaldi form, and fan the vegetable rounds accordion-style with a palette knife.

== Preparation and serving ==
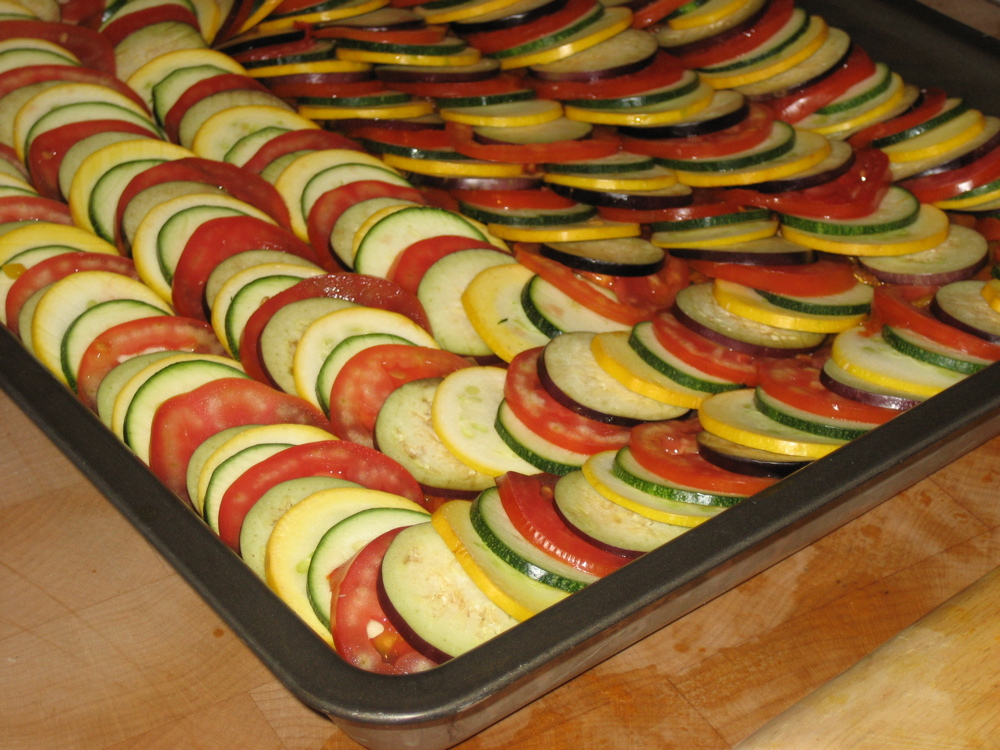
Vegetable rounds arranged on a baking tin

According to Thomas Keller's recipe, a piperade is made of peeled, finely chopped, and reduced peppers, yellow onions, tomatoes, garlic, and herbs. The piperade is spread thinly in a baking tray or casserole dish, then layered on top with evenly sized, thinly sliced rounds of zucchini, yellow squash, Japanese eggplant, and roma tomatoes, covered in parchment paper, then baked slowly for several hours to steam the vegetables. The parchment is removed so that the vegetables roast, acquiring additional flavor through caramelization. To serve, the piperade is formed into a small mound, and the rounds arranged in a fanned-out pattern to cover the piperade base. A balsamic vinaigrette is drizzled on the plate, which may be garnished.

== See also ==
- İmam bayıldı
- List of casserole dishes
- List of vegetable dishes
