= Africa Paradis =

2006 film directed by Sylvestre Amoussou

- Directed by: Sylvestre Amoussou
- Written by: Sylvestre Amoussou
- Starring: Stéphane Roux; Eriq Ebouaney; Sylvestre Amoussou
- Cinematography: Guy Chanel
- Edited by: Nicolas Chaudeurge
- Music by: Wasis Diop
- Distributed by: Metis Productions
- Release date: November 18, 2006
- Running time: 86 minutes
- Countries: France; Benin
- Language: French

Africa Paradis is a 2006 satirical speculative fiction film written and directed by Beninese actor Sylvestre Amoussou. It was produced in France and Benin and was intended to comment on the situation of African refugees in Europe.

== Plot ==
In the year 2033, the United States of Africa is a thriving and affluent country located in Africa. At the same time, Europe struggles with economic and political crisis, poverty and underdevelopment. Olivier is a computer scientist who lives in France with Pauline, a teacher. Both are unemployed with few prospects given Europe's dire economy. The desperate couple decide to immigrate to Africa in hope of finding a better life, even knowing they will face anti-European discrimination in Africa.

On arrival in Africa, Olivier and Pauline's entrance visa is rejected. The couple then try to illegally cross the border hidden in a smuggler vehicle, but are stopped by border police and detained until they can be deported back to France. Olivier manages to escape, and is taken in by a group of poor white Africans who live in housing projects. He eventually steals the identity of a dead white man so he will have employment documentation.

Meanwhile, Pauline gets a job as a domestic servant to Modibo Koudossou, a politician who is sponsoring a controversial immigration reform bill to address the flood of economic refugees from Europe. Against a backdrop of political intrigue that includes an assassination attempt by corrupt political opponents, Pauline and Modibo grow increasingly attracted to one another. Eventually Olivier is caught and faces deportation to Europe, forcing Pauline to make a choice between the two men and the course of her own life.

== Cast ==
- Stéphane Roux as Olivier Morel
- Eriq Ebouaney as M'Doula
- Sylvestre Amoussou as Modibo Koudossou
- Charlotte Vermeil as Pauline
- Sandrine Bulteau as Clémence
- Martial Odone as M'Douala
- Mylène Wagram as Koudossou
- Emil Abossolo-Mbo as Yokossi
- Christian Gibert as Woytek
- Thierno Ndiaye Doss as Le ministre (as Thierno Ndiaye)
- Cheik Doukouré as Kobaou
- Jean-Pierre Beau as Sylvain
- Nathalie Chaban as Charlotte
- N'Gwamoué Diabaté as Papy
- Sonia Kagna as Mamy

== Reception ==
In The Moving Arts Film Journal, reviewer Alison Frank considered Africa Paradis to be "enjoyable as a comedy" while also thought-provoking, but also noted the film "felt a little amateurish" making it difficult to become fully involved in the story.
