= Panafrican Film and Television Festival of Ouagadougou =

Annual film festival held in Ouagadougou, Burkina Faso

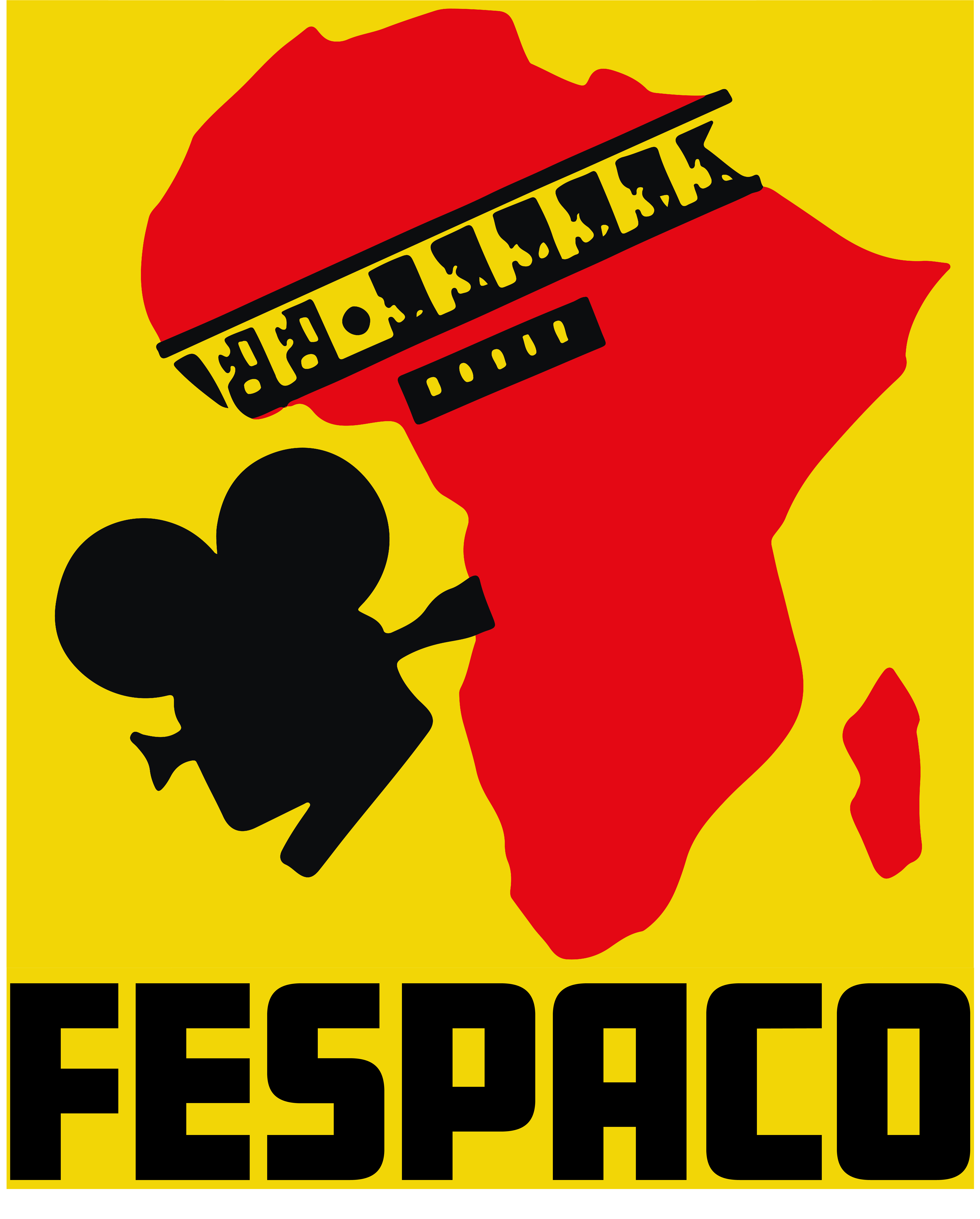
- Location: Ouagadougou, Burkina Faso
- Founded: 1969
- Website: FESPACO

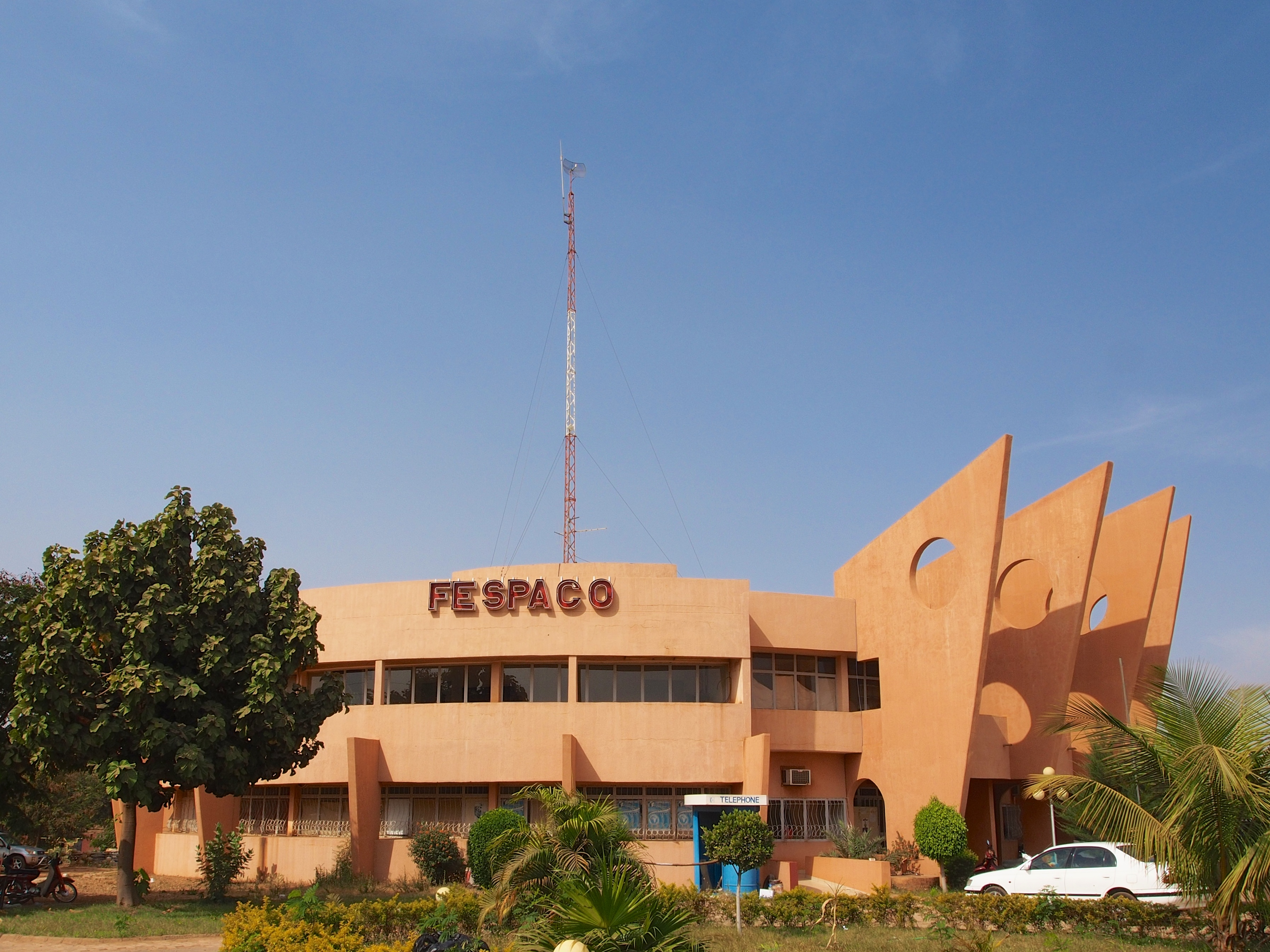
FESPACO headquarters, Ouagadougou

The Panafrican Film and Television Festival of Ouagadougou (French: Festival panafricain du cinéma et de la télévision de Ouagadougou, or FESPACO) is a film festival in Burkina Faso, held biennially in Ouagadougou, where the organization is based. It accepts for competition only films by African filmmakers and chiefly produced in Africa. FESPACO is scheduled in March every second year, two weeks after the last Saturday of February. Its opening night is held in the Stade du 4-Août, the national stadium.

The festival offers African film professionals the chance to establish working relationships, exchange ideas, and to promote their work. FESPACO's stated aim is to "contribute to the expansion and development of African cinema as means of expression, education and awareness-raising". It has also worked to establish a market for African films and industry professionals. Since FESPACO's founding, the festival has attracted attendees from across the continent and beyond.

== History and founding ==
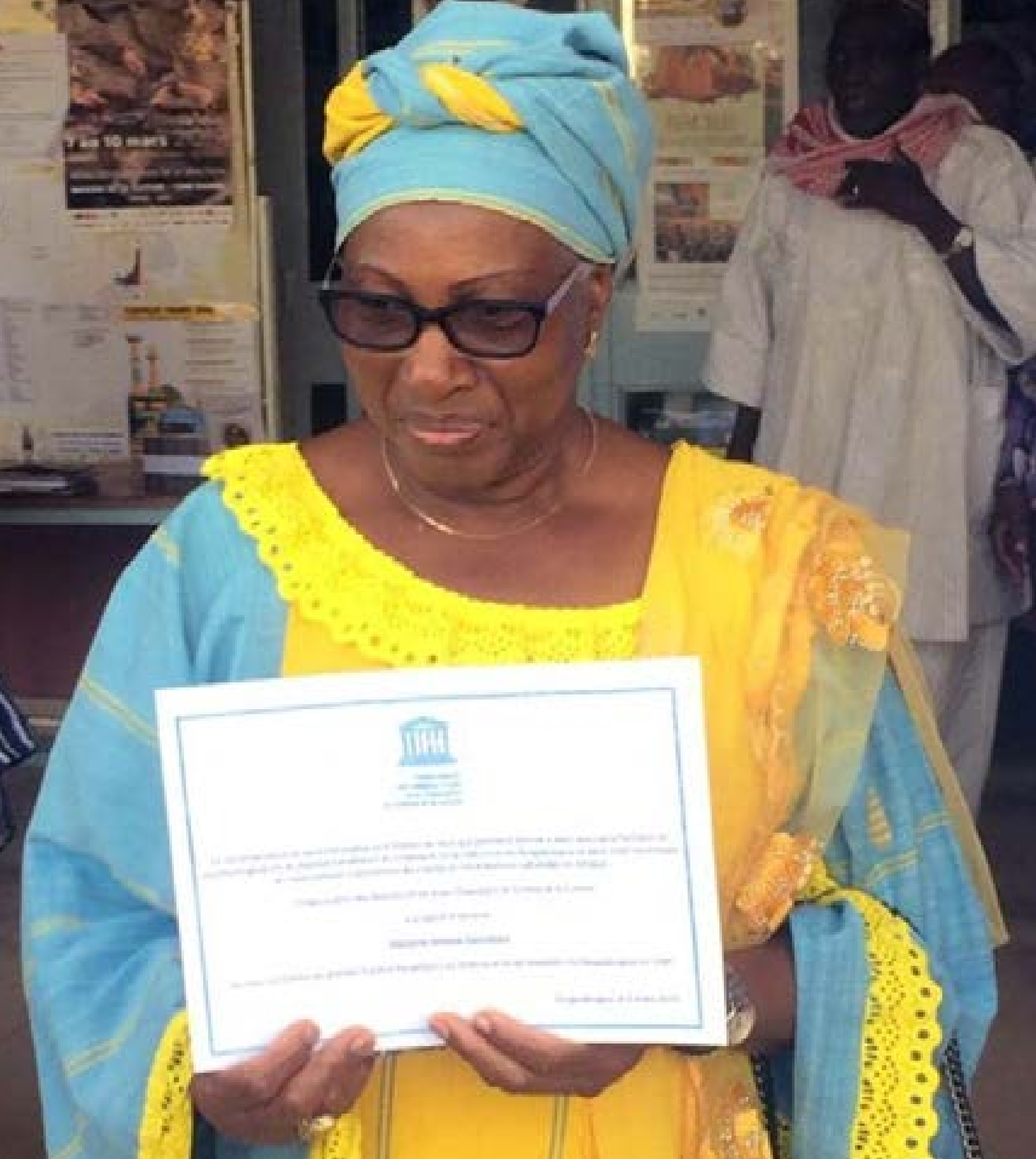
Festival co-founder Alimata Salembéré, after receiving a certificate of appreciation from the Director-General of UNESCO, as a guest of honour at the 26th edition of FESPACO

The film festival was founded as the Festival Panafricain du Cinéma et de la Télévision de Ouagadougou in 1969, at the Carthage Film Festival in Tunis. A committee at the festival involving several of the same filmmakers also laid the groundwork for the foundation of the Pan African Federation of Filmmakers (FEPACI), which was formally established in 1970.

Alimata Salambere, the cultural minister of Burkina Faso from 1987 to 1991, was one of the founders of the festival. At its third edition in 1972, the festival was named FESPACO for short, keeping its full title as "Festival Panafricain du Cinéma et de la Télévision de Ouagadougou". FESPACO was recognized formally as an institution by governmental decree on 7 January 1972. Its award ceremony and base of operations is Ouagadougou, the capital of Burkina Faso, where the annual awards ceremony is also held.

In 1972, the Étalon de Yennenga award was established in honor of Princess Yennenga, the mythical founder of the Mossi empire, to reward the feature fictional or documentary film most representative of African identity. The first winner of the best film award was Le Wazzou Polygame by Oumarou Ganda of Niger. Since then, the best film award has been won by directors from Cameroon, Morocco, Mali, Nigeria, Ivory Coast, Algeria, Burkina Faso, Ghana and the Democratic Republic of the Congo.

=== Evolution from 1969 to 2022 ===
The festival has evolved into an internationally recognized and respected event, regarded as the main event of African Cinema.

At the festival's founding in 1969, five African nations: Upper Volta (Burkina Faso), Cameroon, Ivory Coast, Niger and Senegal, were represented, as well as France and the Netherlands. A total of 23 films were shown. At its second edition, the participant African countries rose to nine, including for the first time Algeria, Tunisia, Guinea, Mali, and Ghana, and a total of 40 films were shown. In 1983, the festival included MICA (le Marche International du Cinema et de la television Africaine), a market for African film stock and video footage.

From 1985 onward, the festival adopted different themes for the annual event, starting with "the cinema, people, and liberation". The theme for the 2007 festival was "the actor in the creation and promotion of African films".

As the festival became more prominent, its budget and sponsors increased; the donor countries include Burkina Faso, Denmark, Finland, France, Germany, Netherlands, Sweden, Republic of China. Donor organizations include AIF (ACCT), PNUD, UNESCO, UNICEF, European Union and Africalia. Due to its international recognition, FESPACO has enabled African filmmakers to show their talents and sell their products in the international market, as well as to promote development of African products and technicians in the industry′.

The delegate generals of FESPACO since 1972 have been Louis Tombiano, from 1972 to 1982; Alimata Salembéré, from 1982 to 1984; Filippe Savadogo, from 1984 to 1996, Baba Hama, from 1996 to 2008, Michel Ouedraogo, from 2008 to 2014, Ardiouma Soma, from 2014 to 2020, and Alex Moussa Sawadogo, from 2020 until present day.

The new headquarters of FESPACO (previously located in the premises of the Economic and Social Council near the Roundabout of the United States) and work on which began in 1994, was inaugurated in 2005 not far from the African Cinematheque.

The ransacking of the French Institute during demonstrations following the coup d'état of September 2022 deprived the festival of two screening rooms in the city centre.

== Main initiatives ==
- African international film and television market: FESPACO is a festival that promotes African filmmakers and facilitates the screening of all African films. This unique festival in Africa enables contacts and exchange between film and audiovisual professionals of Africa and also contributes to the expansion and development of African cinema as a means of expression, education and awareness rising.
- Promotion of African cinema and culture: African cinema is promoted through publication of catalogues, FESPACO news, FESPACO newsletter, and maintenance of an African film library, which has film archives and a data bank. In addition, it supports a traveling cinema. As the festival allows exclusively African films in competition, it supports raising the quality of African films and the filmmakers.
- Non-profit screenings in rural areas: FESPACO also promotes non-profit screenings in rural areas, in collaboration with non-governmental organizations or associations in schools and other public or private institutions.
- Promotion of African cinema in other international festivals: FESPACO organizes various film events, such as film week and film premieres. It also promotes African cinema in other international festivals.
- MINIFESPACO: promotion of FESPACO in national events. FESPACO organized MINIFESPACO, held in Ouahigouya (Burkina Faso) from 5 to 8 June 2013, at Institut Olvido, to extend audiences for African films. The first edition was held from June 5 to 8, 2013 and allowed the screening of a dozen films selected for the 2013 edition.

== Awards ==
The most prestigious award of the festival is the "Étalon d'or de Yennenga" (Golden Stallion of Yennenga) or short Golden Stallion), named after the legendary founder of the Mossi empire. The "Étalon d'or de Yennenga" is awarded to the African film that best shows "Africa's realities"; A Silver Stallion and Bronze Stallion (for 2nd and 3rd place) have been awarded since 2005.

Other special awards include the Oumarou Ganda Prize, given for the best first film, and the Paul Robeson Prize for the best film by a director of the African diaspora. (The latter is named for a major 20th-century American actor, singer and civil rights activist in the United States.)

== Ouagawood ==
Ouagawood is the name given to the African film industry whose films are presented in Ouagadougou during FESPACO. It was used for the first time by a BBC journalist and the daily La Libre Belgique during FESPACO 2011.

The term "Ouagawood" is a portmanteau combining Ouaga, the diminutive of "Ouagadougou", capital of Burkina Faso, and that of another symbol of the film industry, "Hollywood" (similar to Bollywood and Nollywood). This name did not however gain popularity.

== See also ==
- African cinema
- Africa Movie Academy Awards
- FESPACO 2023
- Film festivals in Africa
- List of television festivals
