= Clay pot cooking =

Process of cooking food in pottery

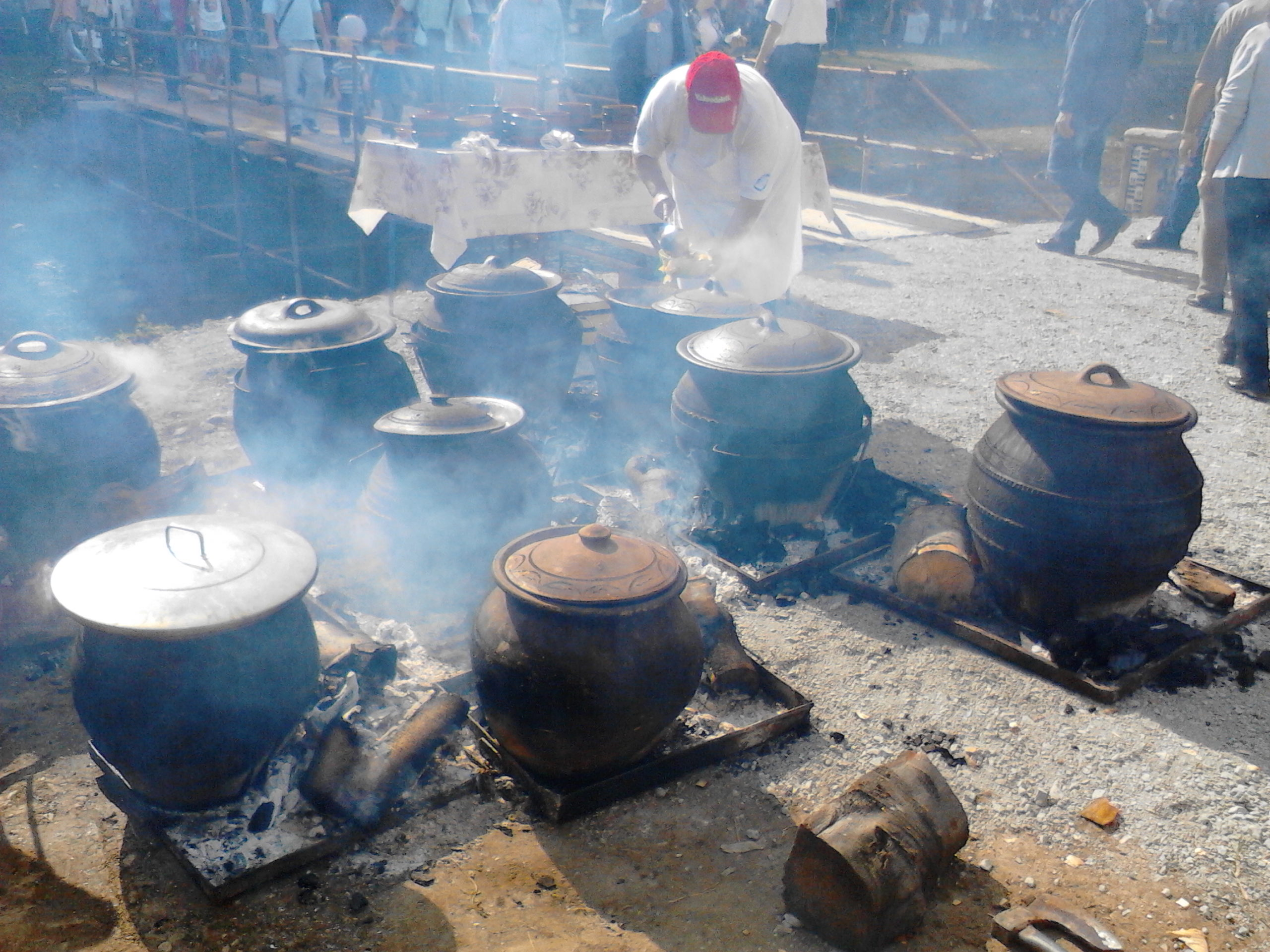
Cooking of svadbarski kupus (wedding cabbage) in ceramic pots, Serbia

Clay pot cooking is a process of cooking food in a ceramic pot.

== History ==
Cooking in unglazed clay pots which are first immersed in water dates at least to the Etruscans in the first century BC but likely dates to several centuries earlier. The Romans adapted the technique and the cooking vessel, which became known as the Roman pot, a cooking vessel similar to those made since April 1967 by the German company Römertopf. According to Paula Wolfert, "all Mediterranean food used to be cooked in clay."

In the Han dynasty, pots unglazed on the exterior known as fus (now called sandy pots) were used for wet clay cooking.

In Japan clay pots are mentioned from the 8th century and originally referred to as nabe. As pots made from other materials entered use, the Japanese clay pots were distinguished by calling them donabe; do means clay or earth.

Cooking in clay pots became less popular once metal pots became available. Clay remained popular for those dishes that depended on the unique qualities of clay cooking; Food & Wine called out such dishes as biryani, cassoulet, daube, tagine, jollof rice, kedjenou, cazuela, and baked beans.

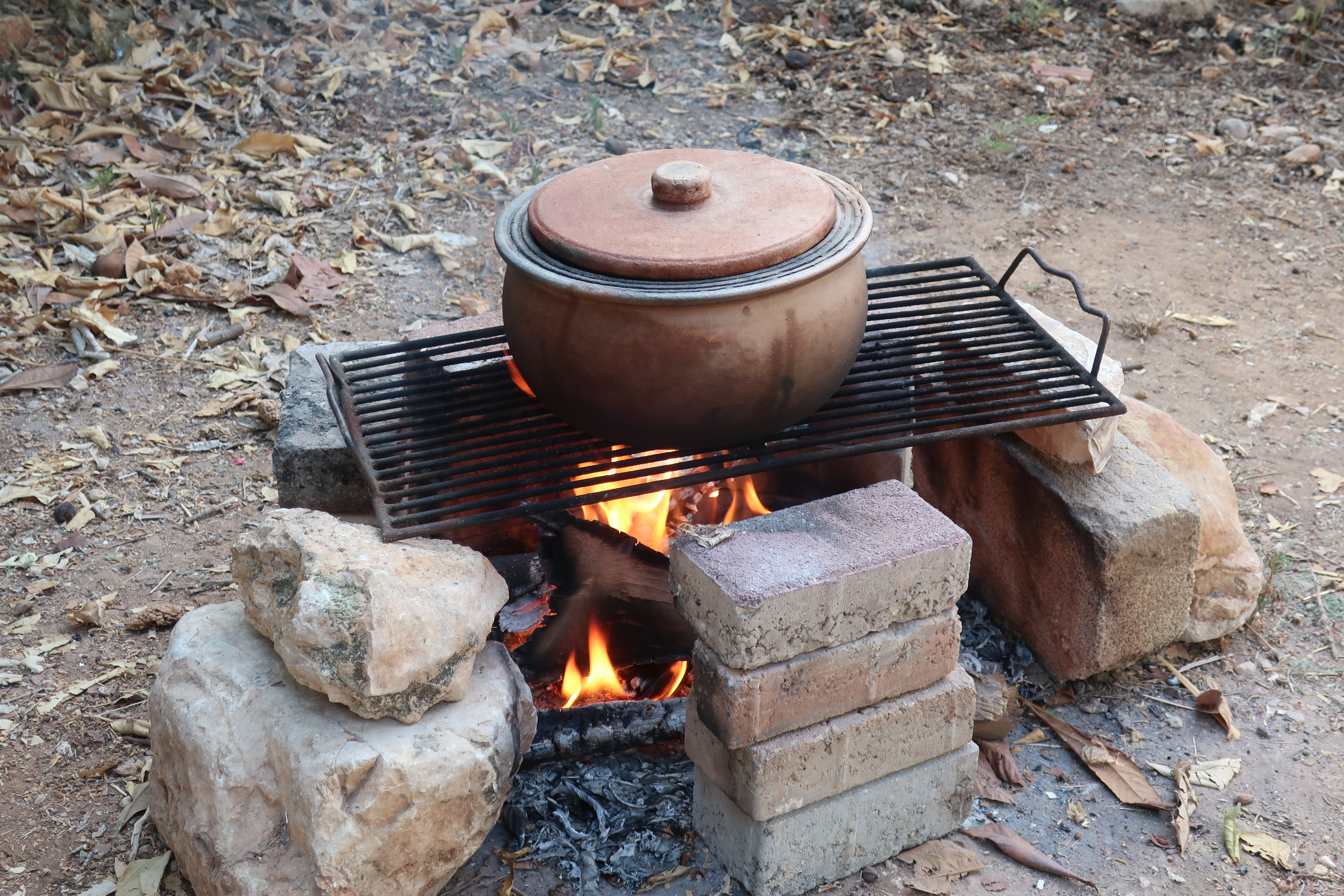
Earthenware cooking pot on gridiron

== Properties ==
Clay cookers allow food to be cooked with minimal additional liquids or fats.

Individual clay beds are considered to provide specific properties for cooking, and cooking vessels of a particular type often are valued for being made of the traditional type of clay. The micaceous clay found at Taos Pueblo holds heat for a long time. The pots made from this clay are considered to contribute flavor to what is cooked within them.

The clay from Lake Biwa contains tiny fossils which incinerate and produce small pockets of air, which also hold heat. The pots made from this clay are considered to contribute to flavor to what is cooked within them.

Food & Wine tested multiple dishes in multiple clay pots and said that "In test after test, we found that everything cooked in clay tasted better than the same recipes cooked in metal pans" and that the only drawback to using clay cooking vessels is that they were not indestructible.

== Cooking techniques ==
Different cultures have different techniques of cooking food in clay pots. Some use pots that are fully finished by burnishing and therefore do not require the pot to be soaked each time before use. Some are unfinished and must be soaked in water for 30–45 minutes before each use to avoid cracking. The design and shape of the pot differ slightly from one culture to another to suit their style of cooking.

Seasoning is important to prevent cracking of the vessel when exposed to high heat. Clay pots are initially seasoned with oil and hot water but may be fully seasoned only after the first several uses, during which food may take longer to cook. It is also essential to avoid sudden temperature changes, which may cause the pot to crack. Heat should be started low and increased gradually both on the stovetop and in the oven.

The food inside the pot loses little to no moisture because it is surrounded by steam, creating a tender, flavorful dish. Water absorbed within the walls of the pot prevents burning so long as the pot is not allowed to dry completely. Because no oil needs to be added with this cooking technique, food cooked in clay is often lower in fat than food prepared by other methods.

=== Wet clay cooking ===
The Chinese sandy pot and the Römertopf are both soaked before being filled with food and covered with the lid, which has also been soaked. Both pots go into a cold oven. The sandy pot can also be started on the stove on a burner set very low.

== Characteristics ==
Food cooked in clay is widely considered to acquire an "earthy" taste from the pot. Pots used for many years are believed to acquire a seasoning that contributes to the dish, and cooks often hope to acquire the pots used by their predecessors.

== In Asian cuisines ==
=== Balkans ===
In the Balkans multiple cuisines use a clay pot, often called a güveç, to cook ghivetch and other related dishes. The comleks is a Turkish bean pot.

=== South Asia ===
In the southern states of Andhra Pradesh, Kerala, Tamil Nadu and Telangana in India, the traditional pot used for cooking is called chatti. There are many different types of pots used in the different cultures of North India, Pakistan, Bangladesh.

==== India ====
In northern states, including Punjab, Uttar Pradesh, Haryana, Rajasthan, the cooking pots are called handi. Traditionally, Indian chefs could cook many dishes simultaneously by stacking handi while cooking.

==== Sri Lanka ====
People in Sri Lanka use clay pots to make many dishes including pahi fish curry, called abul thiyal; accharu, a chutney; as well as some meats, rice, and several types of freshwater fish called Lula, Hunga, Magura and Kawaiya.

=== Greater China ===
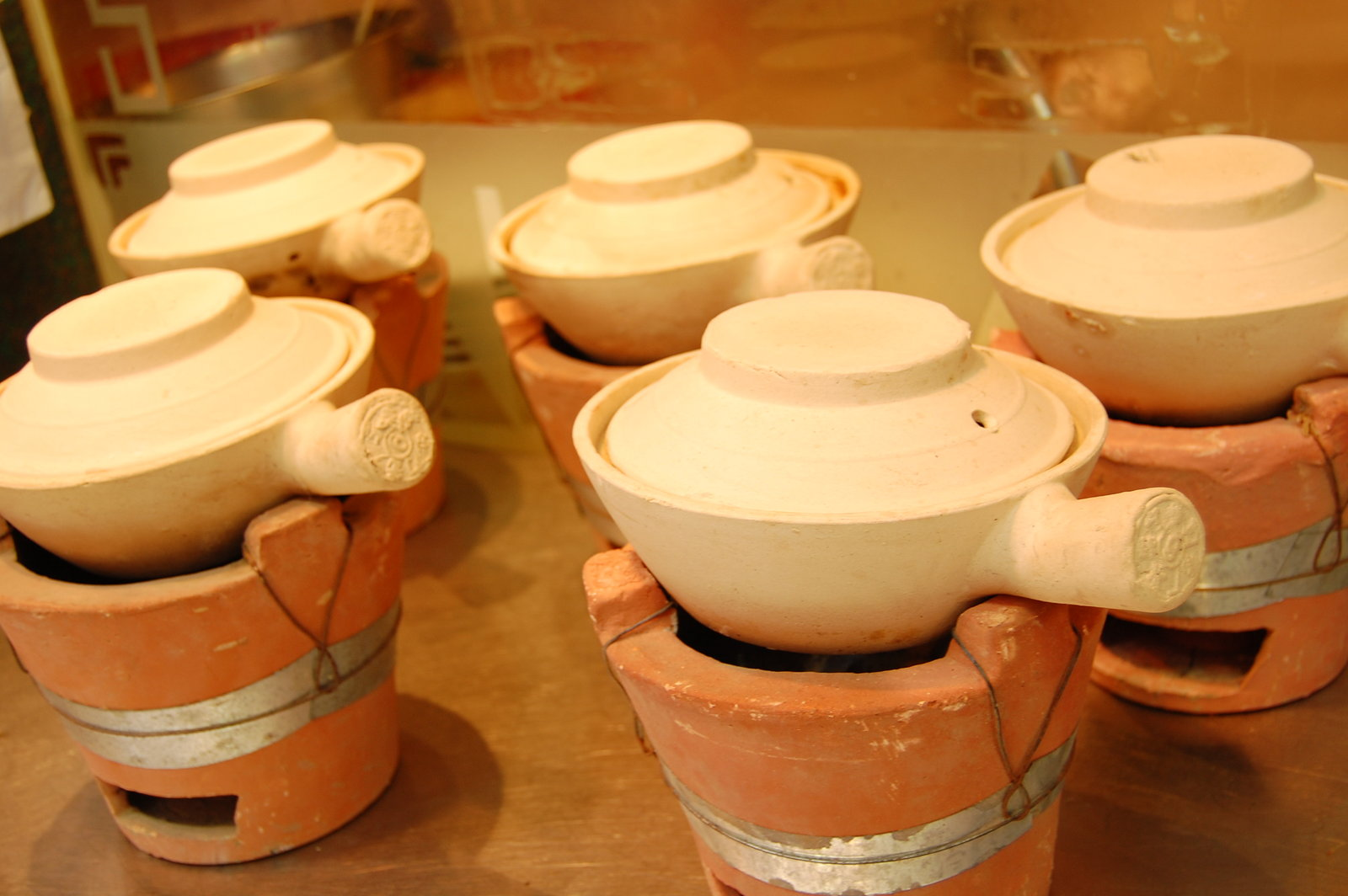
Chinese claypots, used in cooking either food or medicine

In China, the pot used for such cooking is generally known as shaguo (Chinese: 砂鍋; pinyin: shāguō; Cantonese Yale: sāwō) or boujai (Chinese: 煲仔; Cantonese Yale: bōu jái), a Cantonese word for 'little pot'. Clay pot dishes are sometimes labeled as 'hot pot' or 'hotpot' dishes on the menus of Chinese restaurants in English-speaking areas of the world, but they should not be confused with hot pot dishes that are served in a large metal bowl and cooked at the table. In Taiwan, the chicken dish sanbeiji is prepared in a clay pot.

Another common Chinese clay pot is the sandpot or sandy pot, a round pot with a lid, glazed on the inside and unglazed on the outside, which allows them to be soaked before cooking but not add liquid to the ingredients. After soaking the pots are filled with food and placed in a cold oven or started over a very low burner. As of 1996 sandy pots were made in various sizes from individual serving sizes to 5 quart sizes. They are made from a specific clay which is mixed with sand before a very high-temperature firing. The sandy pot evolved from the fu, which was used in the Han dynasty to cook a dish called weng.

Common dishes are claypot rice and little pot rice.

=== Japan ===
In Japan, the donabe is a traditional cooking vessel. It is made from a clay that is porous and coarse. In the area around Iga, Iga-yaki (Iga-style) donabe, have been made since 1832; Iga-yaki pottery in general dates back to the 7th century and is highly valued. It became particularly popular for donabe during the Edo period. The highest-quality donabe can take two weeks to make. There are multiple styles of donabe made for the preparation of different dishes.

Donabe can be used over an open flame, and food is often served out of the donabe.

A culture surrounding donabe developed called nabe o kakomu, which means 'surrounding the pot' or a communal meal. The concept has been featured repeatedly in the media and in donabe cookbooks. According to Naoko Takei Moore, donabe culture "teaches the concept of ichigo-ichie, or "every moment is a once-in-a-lifetime treasure".

With use, donabe develop a patina of crackling of the interior glaze called kannyu. This patina is valued as a sign of character.

=== Korea ===
In Korea, the earthenware pot is called ddukbaegi, often used for soups as seen in Korean restaurants. The stone pot is called dolsot, which is heavier and has a more marbled appearance, used to cook dolsot bibimbap.

=== Vietnam ===
The stew-like dish kho is cooked in a pot. The pot is most often called nồi đất in Vietnamese, although, depending on its size and use, it may also be called nồi kho cá, nồi kho thịt, nồi kho tiêu, or nồi kho tộ.

=== Palestine ===
Clay vessels are used in several dishes in Palestinian cuisine, a zibdiye (Arabic: زبدية) is an unglazed clay bowl used extensively in the Gaza Strip as a cooking vessel (but also as mortar and pestle and serving dish), its used to prepare dishes like zibdiyit gambari; a shrimp stew that is baked in a zibdiye.

Qidreh (Arabic: قدرة, lit. 'clay vessel') is a ceremonial rice and meat dish traditionally cooked in a clay pot that is placed in a communal oven, it is named after the pot it is cooked in.

=== Philippines ===
The traditional pot used for cooking is the palayok.

=== Indonesia ===
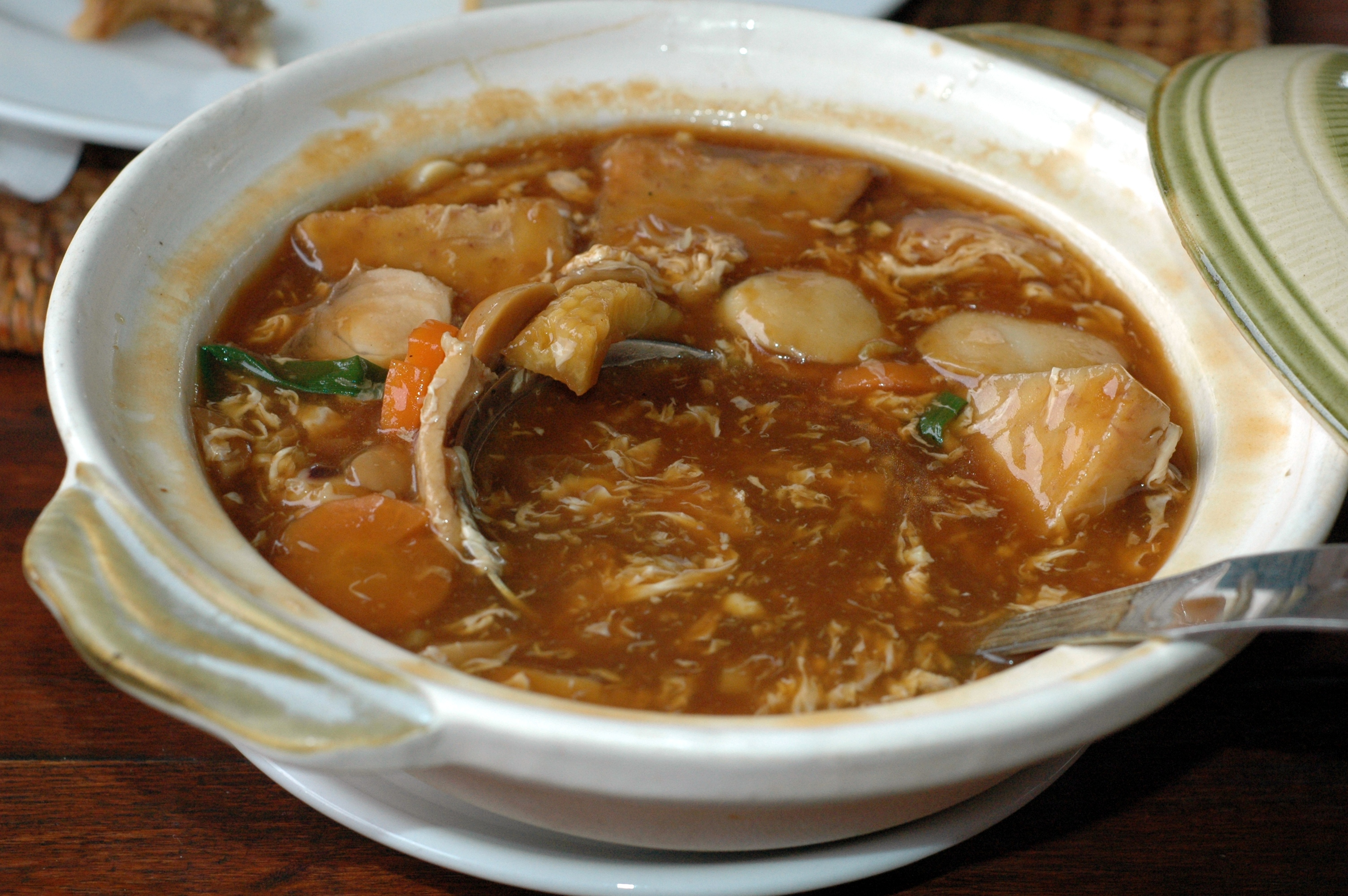
Sapo tahu tofu and vegetables cooked in claypot

The traditional pot used for cooking is called kuali or gentong. The famous cuisine is empal gentong (beef with coconut milk soup). Chinese Indonesian sapo tahu is tofu and vegetables cooked in claypot.

== In African cuisines ==
=== Ethiopia ===
Traditionally, all food was cooked in specialized clay pots. Some traditional dishes are still cooked in clay pots as the same flavor cannot be achieved with metal cookware.

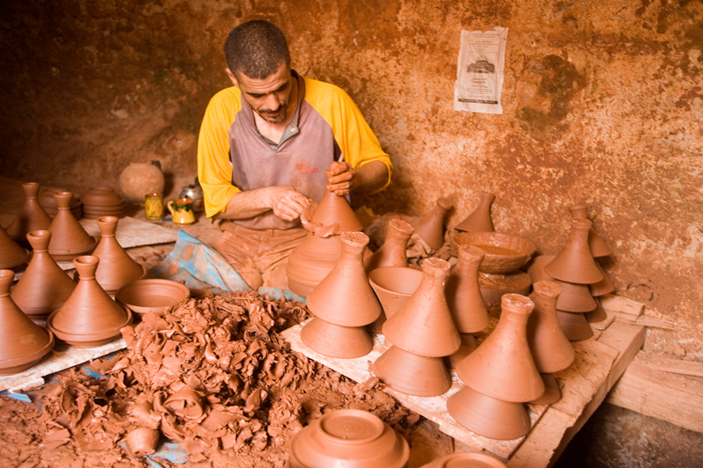
Tajine potter

=== Morocco ===
The tajine is a North African, two-piece pot used in Moroccan cuisine. The bottom part is a broad, shallow bowl, while the top is tall and conical, or sometimes domed. The tall lid acts to condense rising steam and allow the moisture to roll back down into the dish. The tajine lends its name to the meat stew that is typically cooked in this pot.

Another Moroccan clay pot is the tagra, which is used to bake fish. A Moroccan bean pot is the gedra.

== In European cuisines ==
=== France ===
In French cuisine the daubiere is used to cook daubes. A tripiere is a specialized earthenware pot for cooking tripe. The diable is an unglazed potbellied container used to dry-cook chestnuts or potatoes. The tian is a low rectangular pan for making tians or gratins.

=== Germany ===
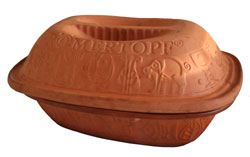
A Römertopf

Clay roasting pots called Römertopf ('Roman pot') are a recreation of the wet-clay cooking vessels used by the Etruscans, and appropriated by the Romans, by at least the first century BC. They are used for a variety of dishes in the oven and are always immersed in water and soaked for at least fifteen minutes before being placed in a cold oven. Since its introduction in 1967, it has influenced cooking traditions in Germany and neighbouring countries.

=== Greece ===
A yiouvetsi is similar to a güveç. Moussaka is made in these.

=== Spain ===
In Spanish cooking a ceramic roaster known as olla de barro is used. Another clay pot used in Spain is the cazuela.

=== Italy ===
The pignatta is a vase-shaped pot used for cooking beans in the coals of a fireplace or in a wood-fired oven. Another Italian clay pot is the tiella, which is a wide glazed clay pot used in Apulia and Calabria. In Tuscany the coccio and fiasco are bean pots.

Dishes commonly prepared in clay pots include ribollita.

== In South American cuisines ==
Clay pots are used in various South American dishes, including cazuela, which is named for the Spanish cooking pot.

== In North American cuisines ==
Native American civilizations traditionally cooked in clay pots, although they fell out of favor after European settlers' introduction of metal cookware. In the modern United States some cooks choose to use clay pots for health or environmental reasons. In New England and other regions, baked beans were traditionally cooked with salt pork in a beanpot in a brick oven for six to eight hours. In the absence of a brick oven, the beans were cooked in a beanpot nestled in a bed of embers placed near the outer edges of a hearth, about a foot away from the fire. "Bean hole" cooking may have originated with the native Penobscot people and later practiced in logging camps. A fire would be made in a stone-lined pit and allowed to burn down to hot coals, and then a pot with seasoned beans would be placed in the ashes, covered over with dirt, and left to cook overnight or longer. The beans were a staple of New England logging camps, served at every meal.

== See also ==
Clay pot cooking at the Wikibooks Cookbook subproject
