= Bender (surname) =

The surname Bender derives from German origin.

In Germany, it is a form of Fassbinder or Fassbender (Cooper). It is an occupational name.

== Academics ==
- Carl M. Bender (born 1943), American applied mathematician and mathematical physicist
- David A. Bender, nutritional biochemist
- Harold H. Bender (1882–1951), professor of philology at Princeton University
- Harold S. Bender (1897–1962), professor of theology
- Lauretta Bender (1897–1987), American child neuropsychiatrist, developer of the Bender-Gestalt Test
- Lionel Bender (1934–2008), American linguist
- Margaret Bender, American anthropologist
- Mark Bender Gerstein, American physical and biological scientist
- Sóley Sesselja Bender (born 1953), Icelandic academic
- Tom Bender (architect) (fl. 1970s-present), American architect, one of the American founders of the "green architecture" and "sustainability" movements

== Arts and entertainment ==
- Aimee Bender (born 1969), American novelist
- Chris Bender (film producer) (born 1971), American film producer
- Chris Bender (singer) (1972–1991), American R&B singer
- Darren Bender, known in the UK TV industry for launching several long running new filmmaker initiatives
- Dawn Bender (born 1935), American actress
- Howard Bender (born 1951), American comics artist
- Jack Bender (born 1949), American film and television director, television producer and former actor
- Karen Bender, American fiction and nonfiction writer
- Landry Bender (born 2000), American actress
- Lawrence Bender (born 1957), American film producer
- Lon Bender (fl. 1977-present), American sound editor, businessman and inventor
- Steve Bender (1946–2006), German musician and record producer, formerly of the group Dschinghis Khan
- William Bender (1930–2014), American music critic

== Military ==
- Chester R. Bender (1914–1996), fourteenth Commandant of the United States Coast Guard
- Hans-Wilhelm Bender (1916–1982), German World War II Luftwaffe bomber pilot
- Stanley Bender (1909–1994), United States Army staff sergeant awarded the Medal of Honor

== Politics ==
- Austin Letheridge Bender (1916–1980), mayor of Chattanooga, Tennessee (1969–1971)
- Birgitt Bender (born 1956), German politician
- David Bender, political activist and host of the radio show "Politically Direct" on Air America Radio
- George H. Bender (1896–1961), Republican politician
- John Bender (Ohio politician), member of the Ohio House of Representatives (1993–2000)
- Lisa Bender (born 1978), American politician and city planner
- Osvaldo Bender (1934–2024), Brazilian businessman and politician
- Riley A. Bender (1890–1973), Republican presidential candidate
- Robert Bender (1936–2025), American politician
- Ryszard Bender (1932–2016), Polish politician and historian
- Silvia Bender (born 1970), German politician
- Mario Bender (born 1966), German politician

== Sports ==
- Anthony Bender (born 1995), American baseball player
- Bob Bender (born 1957), American National Basketball Association assistant coach
- Charles Chief Bender (1884–1954), American Hall-of-Fame baseball pitcher
- Denise Bender (fl. 1970s-1980s), American retired soccer player
- Dragan Bender (born 1997), Croatian basketball player in the Israeli Basketball Premier League
- Garrett Bender (born 1991), American rugby union player
- Gary Bender (born 1940), American retired sportscaster
- Jacob Bender (born 1985), National Football League player
- Jakob Bender (1910–1981), German footballer
- John R. Bender (1882–1928), American football player and coach of college football, basketball, and baseball
- Jonathan Bender (born 1981), American retired National Basketball Association player
- Jules Bender (1914–1982), American basketball player
- Lars Bender (born 1989), German footballer, twin brother of Sven Bender
- Lars Bender (footballer, born 1988), German footballer
- Lou Bender (1910–2009), American basketball player
- Manfred Bender (born 1966), German football manager and former player
- Sven Bender (born 1989), German footballer, twin brother of Lars Bender
- Tim Bender (born 1957), American former snowmobile and NASCAR driver
- Todd Bender, American skeet shooter
- Tom Bender (footballer) (born 1993), Welsh footballer
- Walter Bender (Canadian football) (born 1961), American player of gridiron football

== Other ==
- Amy Bender (born 1965), American sports reporter and producer
- Sir Brian Bender (1949–2021), British civil servant
- Bryan Bender (born 1972), American journalist
- Charles Bender (1896–1993), Canadian rabbi
- Doris Marie Bender (1911–1991), American social worker
- Frank Bender (1941–2011), American forensic artist
- Hans Bender (1907–1991), German parapsychologist
- Levi Yitzchok Bender (1897–1989), rabbi and leader of the Breslov community in both Uman and Jerusalem
- Michael L. Bender (born 1942), former Chief Justice of the Colorado Supreme Court
- Steven Bender (1950–2010), American serial entrepreneur
- Walter Bender (born 1956), American software engineer and expert in electronic publishing

== Fictional characters and nicknames ==
- Bloody Benders, a family of serial killers
- Ostap Bender, a fictional con man who appeared in the novels The Twelve Chairs and The Little Golden Calf by Soviet authors Ilya Ilf and Yevgeni Petrov

== See also ==
- Anthony Strollo (1899–1962), New York mobster also known as "Tony Bender"
