= Giouvetsi =

Baked meat dish

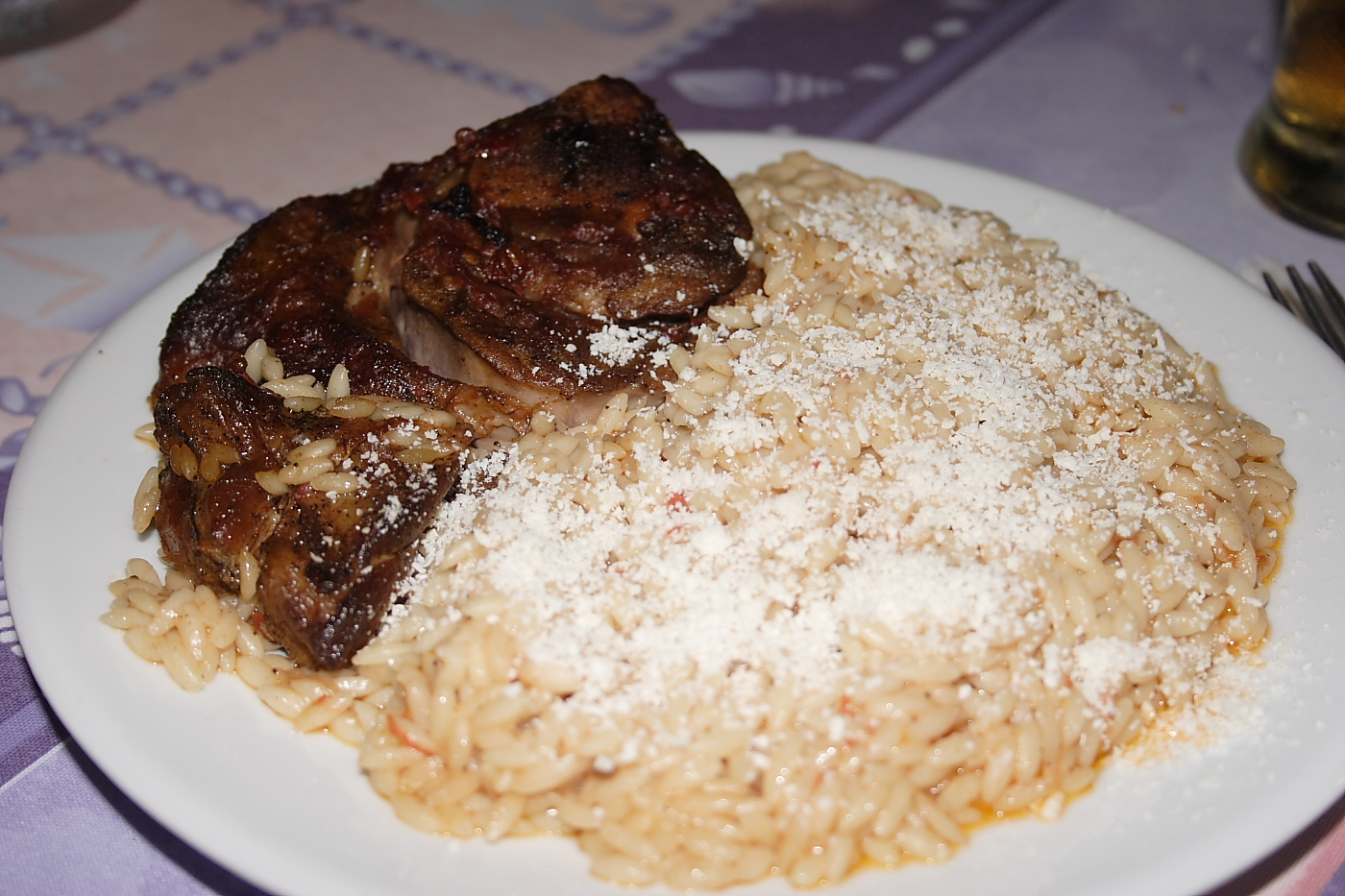
- Alternative names: Youvetsi
- Course: Pasta
- Place of origin: Greek
- Main ingredients: Meat (chicken, lamb or beef), pasta, tomato sauce (with cinnamon or bay leaves)

Giouvetsi, yiouvetsi, or youvetsi (Greek: γιουβέτσι, pronounced [ʝuˈvetsi], from Turkish güveç) is a Greek dish made with chicken, lamb or beef and pasta, either kritharaki (orzo) or hilopites (small square noodles), and tomato sauce (usually spiced with allspice and sometimes cinnamon, cloves or bay leaves). Other common ingredients include onions/shallots, garlic, beef stock, and red wine. It is characteristically baked in a clay pot, a güveç, and served with grated cheese.

Paula Wolfert called it "one of the most famous of all Greek Island lamb dishes."

== See also ==
- Ghivetch, a Balkan food
- List of pasta dishes
