= Sorkun, İskilip =

Village in Turkey

Sorkun
- Village
- Country: Turkey
- Province: Çorum
- District: İskilip
- Population (2022): 289
- Time zone: UTC+3 (TRT)

Sorkun is a village in the İskilip District of Çorum Province in Turkey. Its population is 289 (2022).

The people of Sorkun have "for centuries" specialized in the production of the güveç, an earthenware pot fashioned from locally-dug clay, used for making ghivetch, a savoury meat and vegetable stew.
