= Güveç =

Earthenware pot style

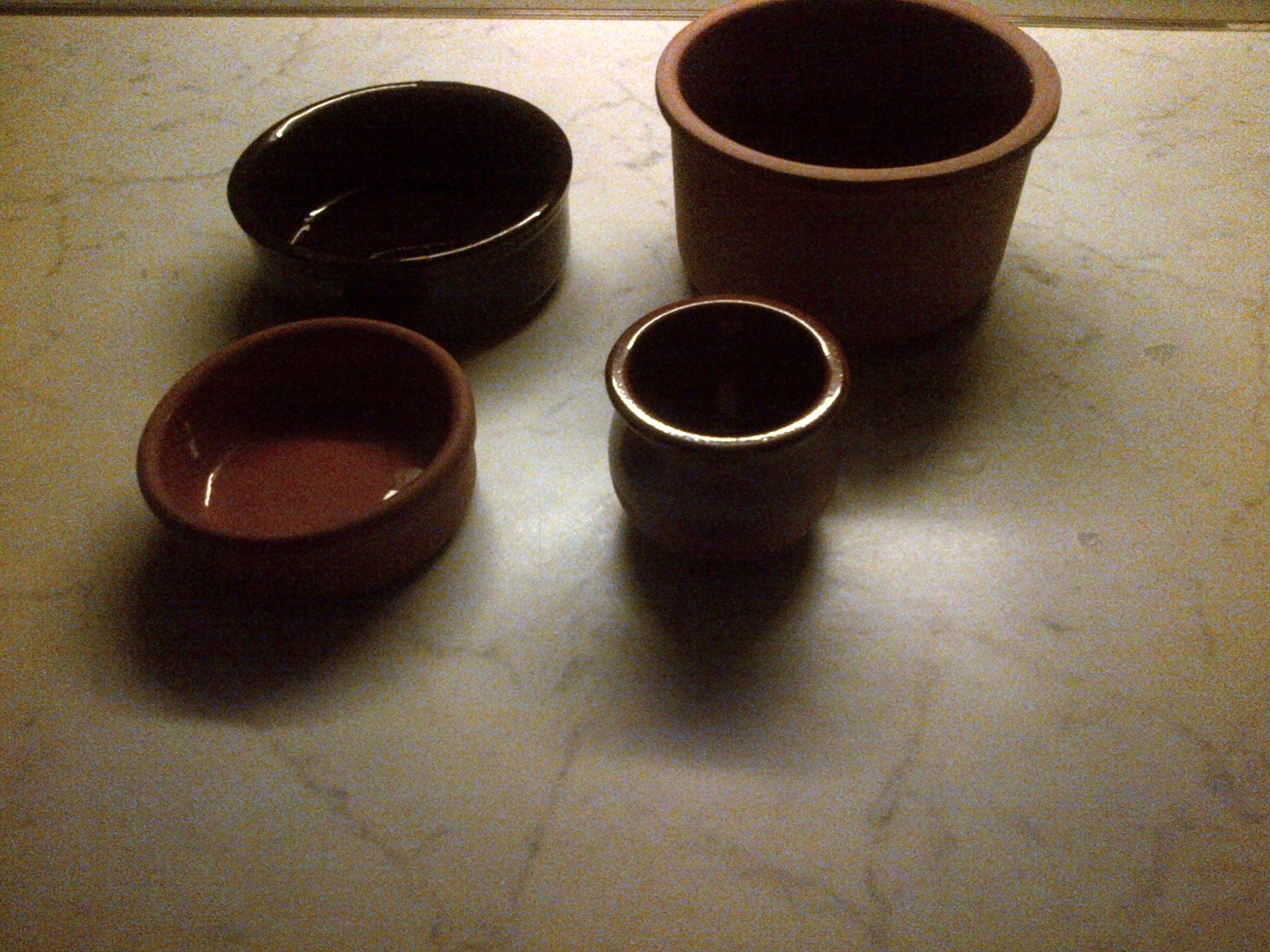
- Güveç and other earthenware pots
- Alternative names: Đuveč
- Region or state: Balkans

Güveç (Turkish pronunciation: [ɟyˈvetʃ]) is a family of earthenware pots used in Balkan, Persian, Turkish, and Levantine cuisine; various casserole or stew dishes cooked in them are called ghivetch. The pot is wide and medium-tall, can be glazed or unglazed, and the dish in it is cooked with little or no additional liquid.

== Etymology ==
Güveç was first mentioned in Dīwān Lughāt al-Turk as Küdeç or Küzeç. The Old Turkic word "Küdeç" means a kind of container made of baked clay, which was derived from the Turkic root "küd-" (to wait, to graze).

== Construction ==
Clay is combined with water and sand and some combination of straw, hay, sawdust or wood ash and kneaded to remove any air bubbles. The pot is thrown or handshaped, allowed to partially dry, and the surfaces smoothed to make them non-porous. After the pot dries completely it is glazed and kiln-fired.

The people of Sorkun have "for centuries" specialized in the production of the pot out of locally dug clay.

== Dishes ==
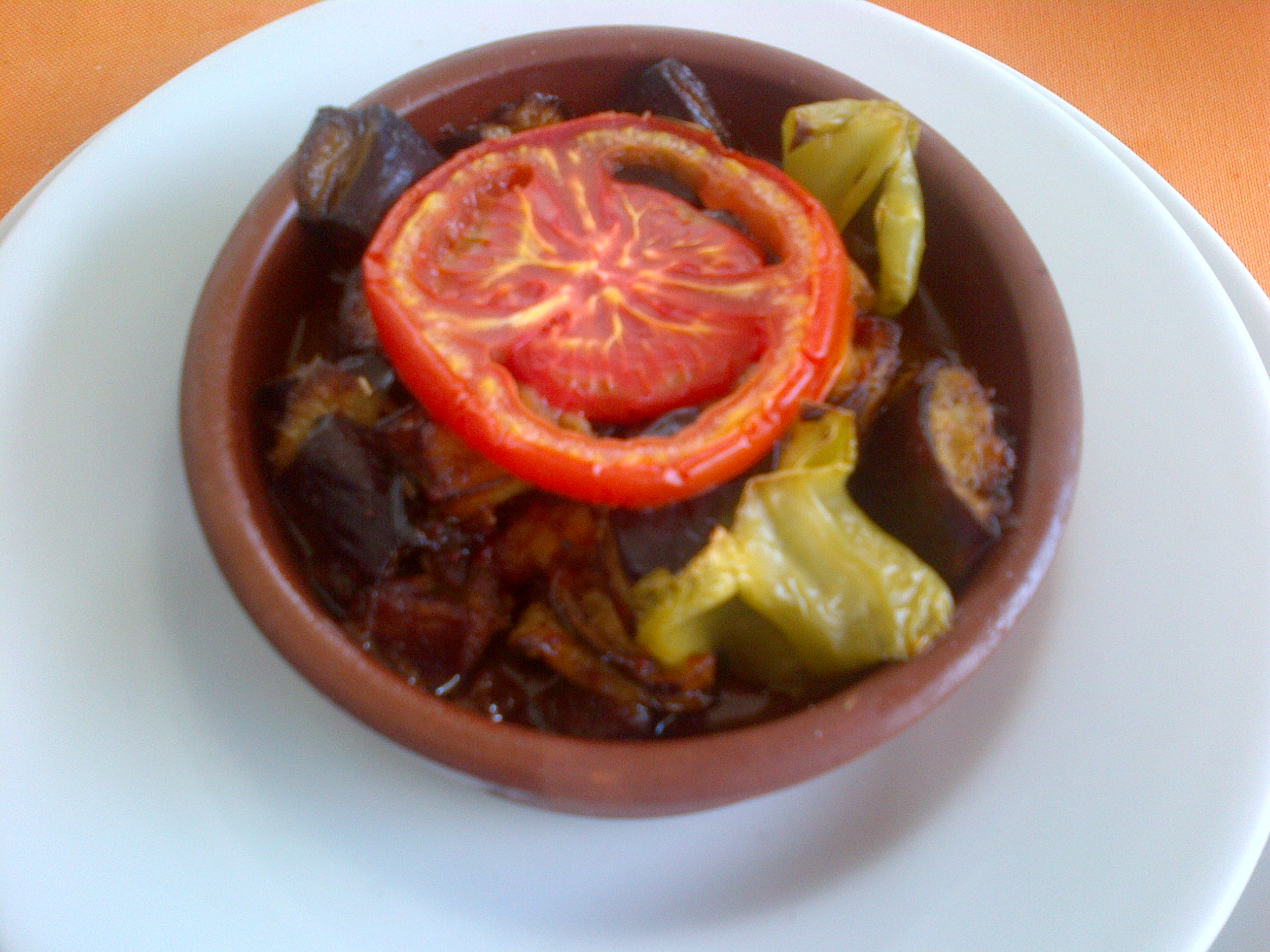
Türlü güveç

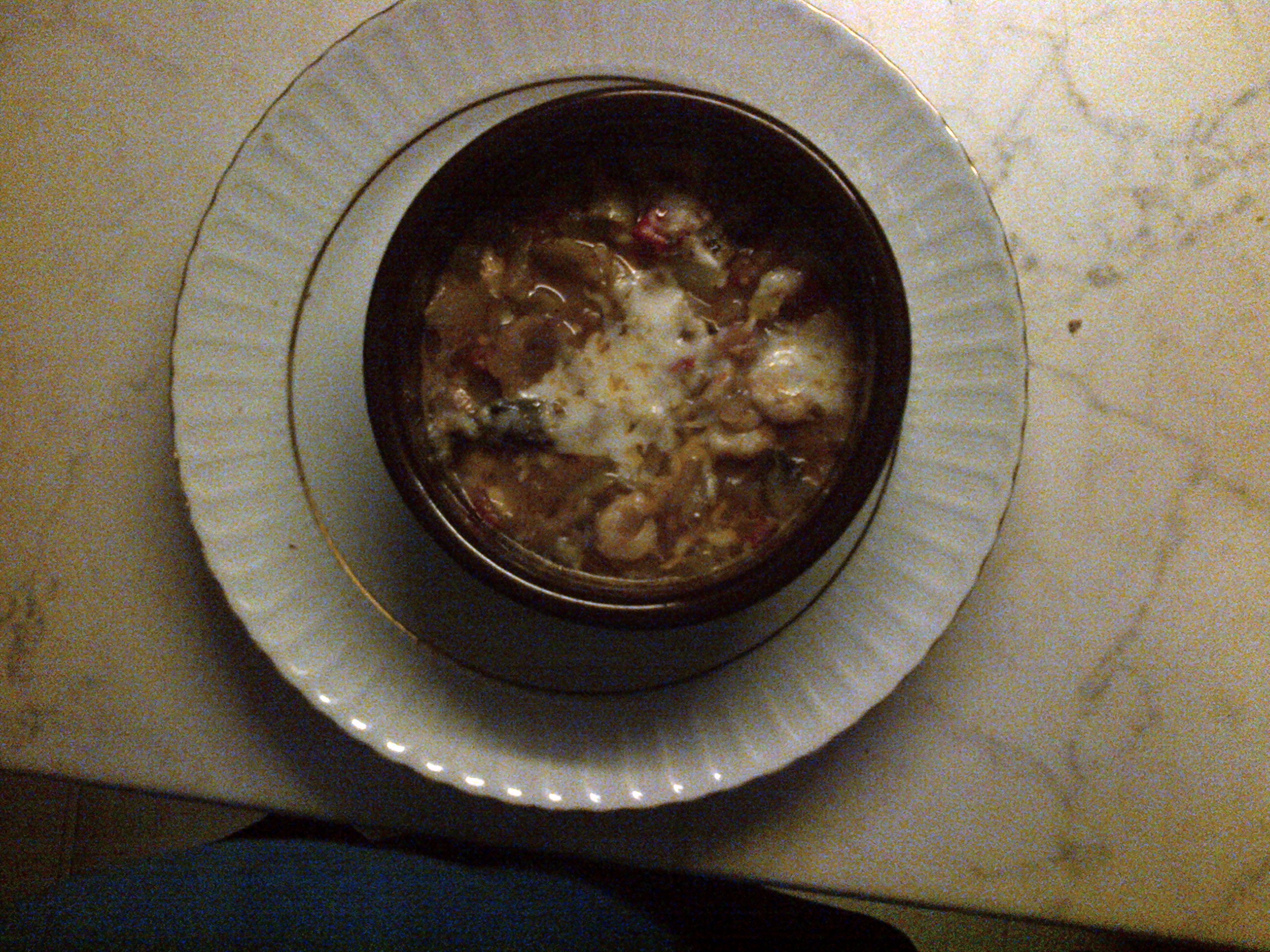
Karides güveç

Dishes traditionally made in such pots are known throughout the Balkans as a traditional autumn vegetable stew, but are most closely associated with Romania and Bulgaria, where it is called ghivetch.

The name đuveč, an earthenware casserole in which the Turkish dish đuveč is traditionally prepared, comes from the Turkish güveç "earthenware pot"; dishes include türlü güveç (or kuzu güveç) and karides güveç.

Güveç dishes can be made in any type of oven-proof pan, but according to Paula Wolfert clay or earthenware pots are preferred for the "earthy taste and aroma" they impart.

== See also ==
- Chanakhi
- Khoresht
- Piti
