= Piti (food) =

Armenian dish with meat and chickpeas

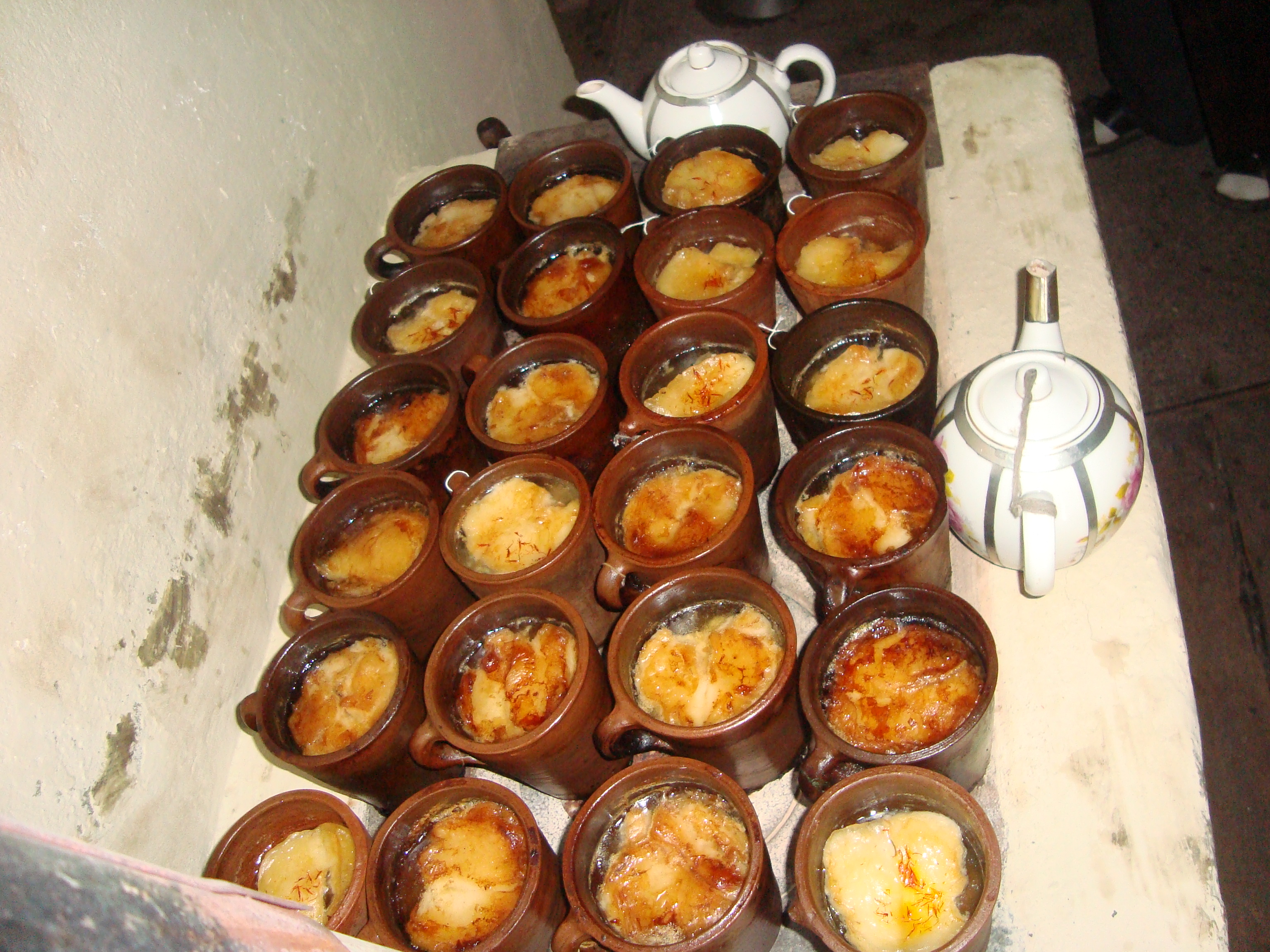
- Shaki piti
- Type: Soup
- Region or state: South Caucasus
- Serving temperature: Hot
- Main ingredients: Mutton, vegetables (tomatoes, potatoes, chickpeas)

Piti is a soup in the cuisines of the South Caucasus and its bordering nations, and is prepared in the oven in individual crocks with a glazed interior (called piti in Turkic languages). It is made with mutton and vegetables (tomatoes, potatoes, chickpeas), infused with saffron water to add flavour and colour, all covered by a lump of fat, and cooked in a sealed crock. Piti is served in the crock, usually accompanied by an additional plate for "disassembling" the meat and the liquid part with vegetables, which may be eaten separately as the first (soup with veg.) and second (meat) course meal.

Piti is a variety of abgoosht, particularly popular in Iran. In Armenia, it is called putuk (Armenian: պուտուկ), the Armenian word for crock.

== Ingredients ==
The main ingredients of piti are mutton, tail fat, chickpeas, potato, onions, dried alycha or other kinds of cherry plum and saffron. Meat is gradually simmered with already soaked chickpeas in piti-pots. Potatoes, onions, alycha and saffron infusion are added 30 minutes before the meal is ready. Sumac powder is also served separately.

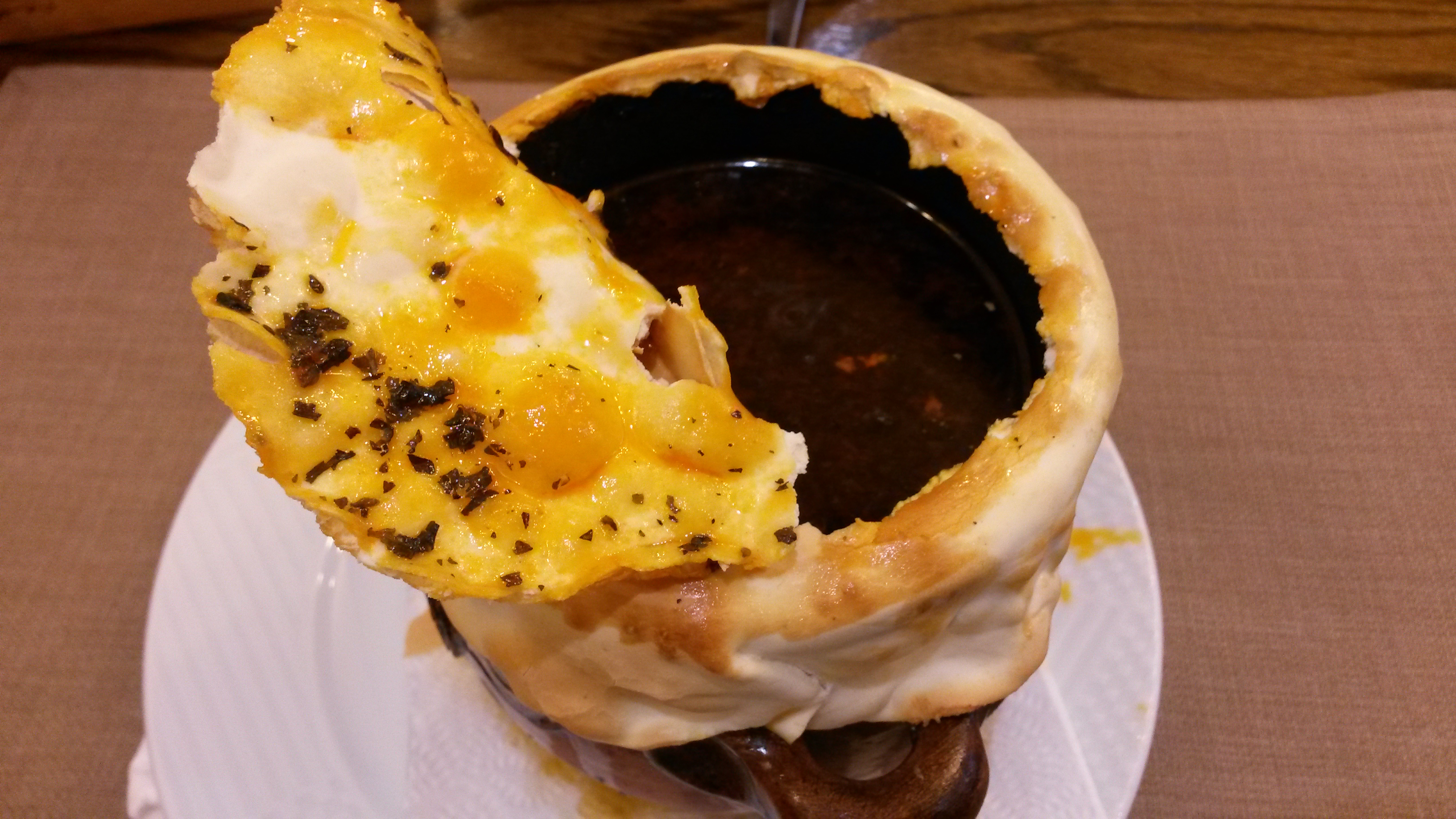
Putuk or piti cooked with covering bread in Armenia

In Armenia, putuk (Armenian word for crock) is traditionally served directly in the clay pot in which it was cooked. The soup is often accompanied by an Armenian leavened bread called matnakash, which can be dipped into the broth. In some regions, the soup is consumed in two steps. Firstly, the broth is served with the bread, and secondly the meat gets added to the broth and the side dish gets served. The main ingredients include lamb meat, mutton, tail fat chickpeas, potatoes, onions, dried alycha and saffron.

In Azerbaijan, piti is eaten in two steps. Firstly, bread is crumpled on a plate and then spiced. After that, the broth is poured over it. Secondly, more crumpled bread is added to the plate and the remainder of the Piti (mutton fat, meat and vegetables) are poured over, mixed together, and eaten.

=== Shaki piti ===
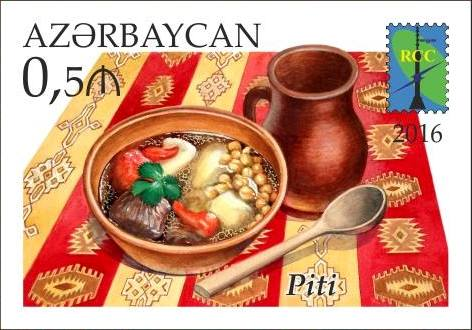

Shaki piti uses boiled chestnuts. It is cooked in a pot. First, chickpeas, mutton and tail fat are put in the pots. After that, water is added and the dish is cooked.

== See also ==
- Abgoosht
- Bozbash
- Chanakhi
- Đuveč
- List of soups

== Sources ==
- V.V. Pokhlebkin, National Cuisines of the Peoples of the Soviet Union, Tsentrpoligraf Publ. House, 1978 (in Russian); English edition: V.V. Pokhlebkin, Russian Delight: A Cookbook of the Soviet People, London: Pan Books, 1978
