= Benfer =

Benfer is a surname. Notable people with the surname include:

- Friedrich Benfer (1905–1996), Italian film actor
- Haps Benfer (1893–1966), American football and basketball player

== See also ==
- Bender (surname)
