= Sesselja =

Sesselja may refer to:

- Sesselja Sigmundsdottir
- Sóley Sesselja Bender
