= Türlü =

Turkish vegetable stew

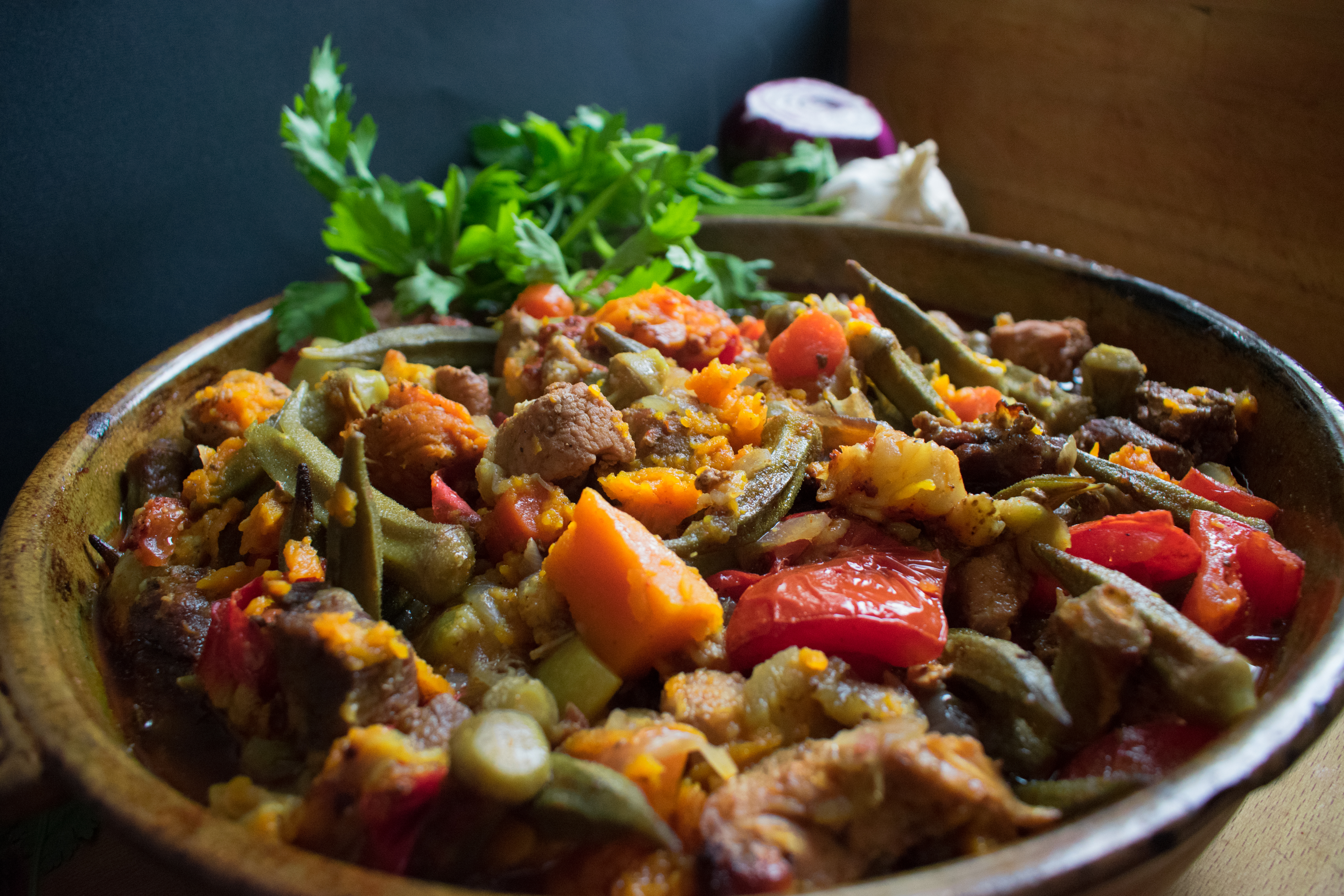
- Macedonian turli tava
- Alternative names: Tourlou; turli perimesh; turli tava
- Course: Main
- Associated cuisine: Turkish; Albanian; Bulgarian; Greek; Macedonian
- Serving temperature: Hot

Türlü is a Turkish casserole made of stewed vegetables that may also include stewed meat. Varieties of the dish are also found in different Balkan cuisines. In particular, it is known as turli perimesh or simply turli in Albania, tourlou in Greece, and turli tava in North Macedonia.

The name derives from the Old Turkic word türlüg, meaning "variety". Türlü may be cooked in a clay cooking pot called güveç. This version of the dish is called türlü güveç in Turkey and in Bulgaria. The Macedonian version, turli tava, is traditionally made in a similar earthenware cooking pot, called tava.

The basic ingredients of türlü vary greatly. The dish usually includes potatoes, eggplant, and okra. Green beans, bell peppers, carrots, zucchini, tomatoes, onions, and garlic can also be added. Meat versions are made with beef, lamb, or veal, and in the Balkans also with pork. Other common ingredients include cooking oil, water, salt, black pepper or crushed red pepper, and tomato paste or pepper paste. The ingredients are mixed and baked in an oven.

== History ==
According to the food historian Priscilla Mary Işın, the oldest türlü recipe dates back to the 18th century. It called for meat, garlic, vegetables such as eggplant, zucchini, and okra, as well as unripe grapes. It also stressed the importance of food presentation.

== Gallery ==
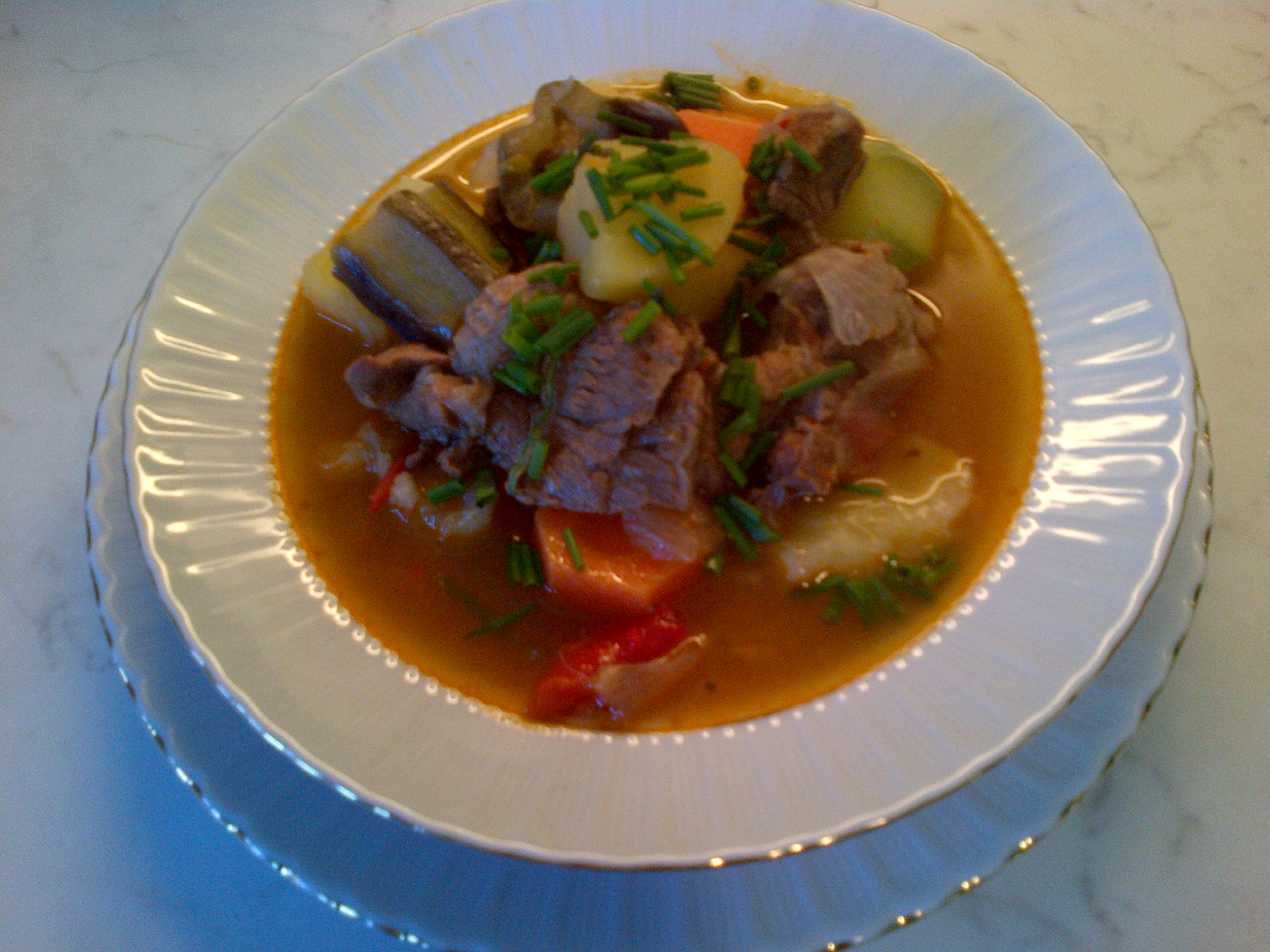
Türlü with veal

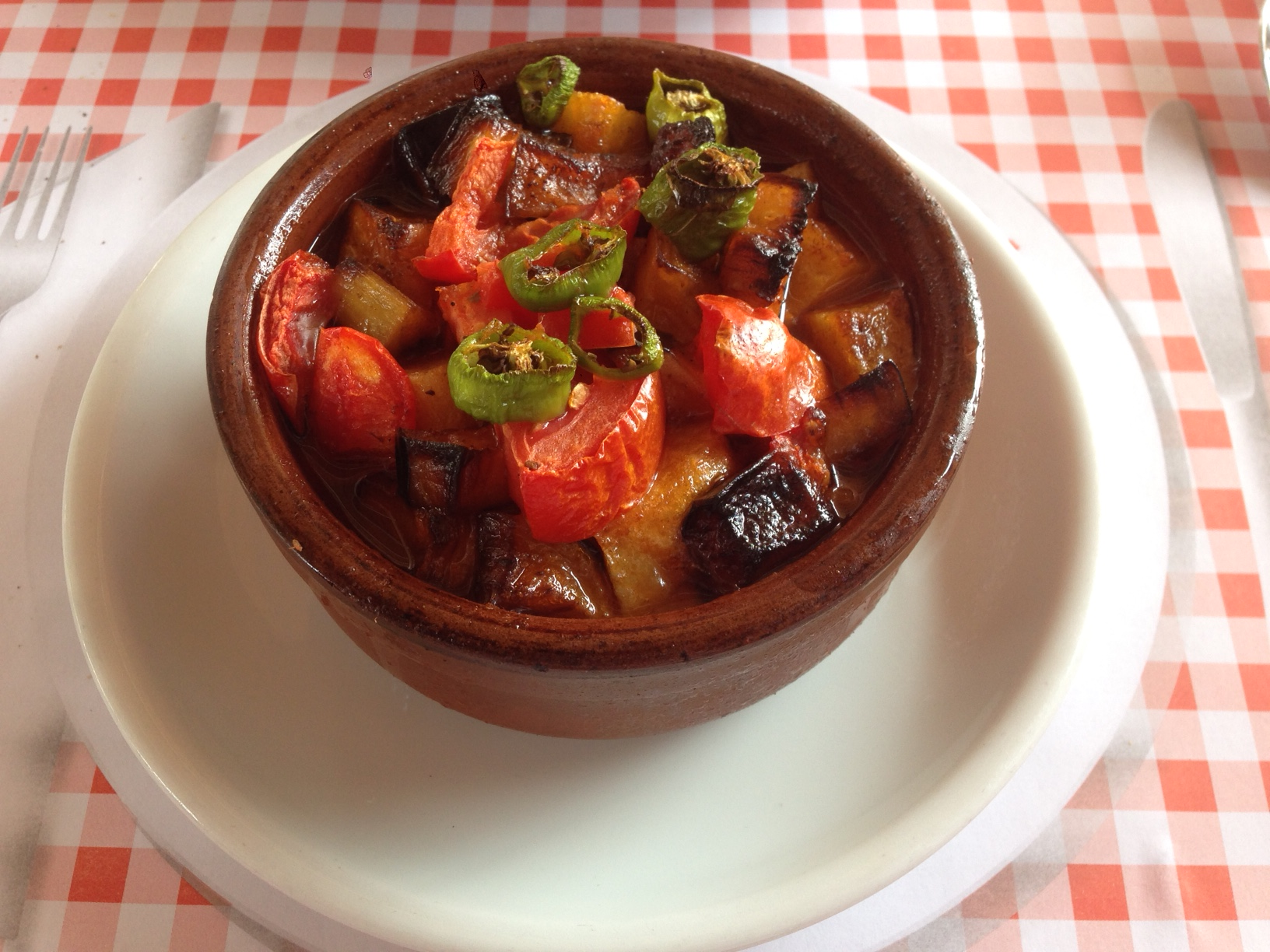
Türlü in a güveç

== See also ==
- Ajapsandali
- Bamia
- Caponata
- Chanakhi
- Ghivetch
- Khoresh
- Pinakbet
- Pisto
- Ratatouille
