= William Bayer =

American novelist

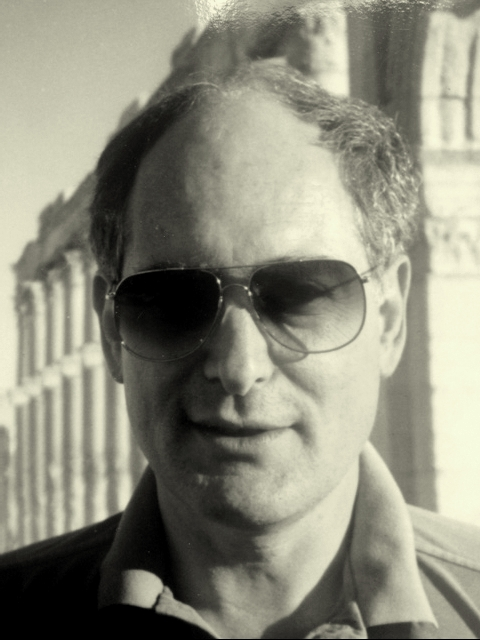
- Born: Cleveland, Ohio, U.S.
- Education: Sidwell Friends School; Hawken School; Phillips Exeter Academy; Harvard College
- Occupation: Novelist
- Spouse: Paula Wolfert
- Relatives: Eleanor Perry (mother); Leo G. Bayer (father)
- Writing career
- Pen name: David Hunt
- Genre: Psychological crime fiction

William Bayer (pronounced “byer”) is an American novelist, the author of twenty-one books including The New York Times best-sellers Switch and Pattern Crimes.

Bayer has written a series of novels featuring fictional New York Police Department lieutenant Frank Janek. He has also written adaptions of his novels for television, and written for other TV shows. Switch was the source for seven television movies, including two four-hour mini-series. In all of them the main character, NYPD Detective Frank Janek, was played by the actor Richard Crenna. All seven movies were broadcast nationally by CBS in prime time.

Bayer's books have been translated into French, Italian, German, Dutch, Japanese, and nine other languages. He has written two novels under the pseudonym David Hunt, later republished in ebook editions under his own name. He wrote and directed the 1971 feature film Mississippi Summer which won the Best First Feature Award (the "Hugo") at the 1970 Chicago International Film Festival.

== Personal life ==
Bayer is the son of attorney Leo G. Bayer and dramatist Eleanor Rosenfeld Bayer, later known as the screenwriter Eleanor Perry. He describes his family background as "secular Jewish" and identifies as such. During the 1940s his parents wrote and published four mysteries using the pen name "Oliver Weld Bayer." They also wrote a children's book, Dirty Hands Across The Sea, edited a non-fiction anthology, Cleveland Murders, and co-wrote a play Third Best Sport which was produced on Broadway.

Bayer attended the Sidwell Friends School in Washington, D.C.; Hawken School in Lyndhurst, Ohio, and graduated from Phillips Exeter Academy. He graduated cum laude from Harvard College, Cambridge, Massachusetts and then served as an officer with the United States Information Agency in Vietnam for six years. He has been a grantee of the American Film Institute and of the National Endowment for the Arts.

He is married to cookbook author Paula Wolfert, and has lived with her in Tangier, Morocco; New York City, Martha's Vineyard; and in Newtown, Connecticut. They moved to San Francisco and Sonoma, California in 1994. Though their home was not harmed, the 2017 Tubbs Fire affected him deeply: "The fires are going to be a defining point for me, for my life here in Sonoma," he said in 2018. As of September 2021 they reside in the Hudson Valley in New York State.

== Critical comments ==
Of Bayer's novel The Magician's Tale, Marilyn Stasio wrote in The New York Times: "A strange seductive story as eerie as a midnight walk in the fog. [Bayer] starts the fog machine by introducing us to the bleak world that a San Francisco photographer named Kay Farrow sees when she looks out from eyes that are completely colorblind. Her nocturnal prowls through the Tenderloin district take on a terrible purpose after the bizarre murder of a handsome street hustler who was her favorite model and friend. The voice of the storyteller grows more intimate, more mesmerizing, once the narrative begins to explore the shadowy depths of the victim's past. But it is Kay's extraordinary vision that arrests us; with the starkness of a reverse negative, it shows us light and dark, truth and deception, reality and illusion, even good and evil in ways we never imagined."

Of Bayer's novel Pattern Crimes, Seymour Krim wrote in The Washington Post: "There is an electricity to Bayer's writing — rich design, crackling fabric — that sets it apart from the usual competent thriller. Bayer is a bona fide novelist, you first think to yourself, but it is really the combination of the two, formula writer and writer-writer (not unlike Dashiell Hammett) that puts Mr. Bayer in a special niche." Tom Dowling, reviewing Pattern Crimes in The San Francisco Examiner wrote: "Bayer has got the real stuff: a pounding narrative line; real people you can identify with; dialogue that snaps with authority even as it advances the exposition; a riveting sense of locale. Bayer is the new king of the crime fiction heap. At a minimum he has written one unputdownable book."

Thomas Keneally (author of Schindler's List) wrote of Switch: "This is a novel in which the grit and madness of New York are palpable. As well as engrossing the reader utterly, it does high honor to the grand tradition of the American psychological thriller, and despite the riveting nature of its central act of horror, it also traces an exhilarating love affair between two bloodied but triumphantly humane survivors of the city's attrition."

Joseph McLellan, reviewing Tangier in The Washington Post: "The city is the main character of this intricate novel in which East and West meet convulsively and with mutual puzzlement. William Bayer keeps scrupulously the narrative promises he has made and implied, the strands woven so cleverly and in such complex patterns, dyed with a strong influence of atmosphere, that one proceeds willingly, even hastily, through the close-packed pages. As the pages turn and evidence accumulates, it's hard to avoid the conclusion that what we have on our hands is the work of a moralist. He is writing about sex, yes, and colorful enigmatic foreigners, yes, and Islamic (specifically Moroccan) folkways, yes – but beneath it all he is writing about colonialism and the violence implicit therein. Bayer conceals what he is up to with considerable skill until the reader is firmly hooked and it is too late to back out." Ben Pleasants, reviewing Tangier in The Los Angeles Times, wrote: "The graceful prose is as dazzling as the white washed city in full sun."

Author T. Jefferson Parker wrote: "The Dream of the Broken Horses is a hypnotic blend of suspense, mystery and revelation. Erotically charged and poetically rendered, it worked its way straight into my own dreams. It's great to read a smart, sexy thriller and this is one I recommend."

== Awards ==
His novel Peregrine, the first novel to feature Janek, won the 1982 Mystery Writers of America Edgar Award for best novel. The French edition of The Dream Of The Broken Horses was awarded the 2005 Prix Mystère de la critique for best foreign crime novel as was the French edition of Switch. Bayer received the 1994 Prix Calibre 38 for the French edition of Mirror Maze, and the 1998 Lambda Literary Award for best mystery for The Magician's Tale. In 2020, his novel The Murals was short-listed for The International Association Of Crimewriters/North America, Dashiell Hammett Prize for “literary excellence in crime writing.”

== Style and themes ==
Bayer's novels fall into the category of psychological crime fiction, and several have been described as "neo-noir." His books are highly regarded for their strong atmospherics and sense of place (Tangier, Jerusalem, Buenos Aires, Manhattan and San Francisco, with The Magician's Tale and Trick of Light both set entirely in San Francisco.). Starting with Blind Side, and then more consistently with The Magician's Tale and the books that followed, he shifted from third-person narration to first-person narrators— some male, others female, ranging in age from 18 to 50. But despite this shift in narrative strategy, similar motifs and themes appear in many of his books: troubled psychoanalysts; photographs, photography and photographers; psycho-eroticism; obsessive labyrinthine quests; relationships defined by disparities of power; art and art-making; and antagonists the seeds of whose villainy are traced back by detectives (i.e. Janek) to Bayer's actual hometown, Cleveland.

== Bibliography ==
=== Frank Janek novels ===
- Peregrine, St. Martins Press], 1981, ISBN 0-312-92644-8 (1982 Edgar Award winner)
- Switch, Linden Press/Simon & Schuster), 1984, ISBN 0-671-49424-4
- Wallflower, Villard 1991, ISBN 0-679-40047-8
- Mirror Maze, Villard 1994, ISBN 0-679-41459-2

==== Frank Janek television adaptations ====
- Doubletake (1985, two-episode miniseries for CBS, adapted from Switch)
- Internal Affairs (1988, TV movie for CBS)
- Murder in Black and White (1990, TV movie for CBS)
- Murder Times Seven (1990, TV movie for CBS)
- Terror on Track 9 (1992, TV movie for CBS)
- The Forget-Me-Not Murders (1994, TV movie for CBS, adapted from Wallflower)
- The Silent Betrayal (1994, TV movie for CBS)

=== Standalone novels ===
- In Search of a Hero, The World Publishing Company, 1962
- Stardust, Delacorte Press, 1974
- Visions of Isabelle, Delacorte Press, 1975, ISBN 0-440-09315-5
- Tangier, E. P. Dutton, 1978, ISBN 0-525-21410-0
- Punish Me With Kisses, Congdon & Lattes, 1981, ISBN 0-671-41991-9
- Pattern Crimes, Villard 1987, ISBN 0-394-55876-6
- Blind Side, Villard 1989, ISBN 0-394-57257-2
- Tarot, fr:Payot & Rivages (France), 2001, ISBN 978-2-7436-0832-3
- The Magician's Tale, G. P. Putnam's Sons, 1997, ISBN 978-0-399-14260-4 (1998 Lambda Literary Awards winner). (Originally published under the pen name "David Hunt.")
- Trick of Light, G. P. Putnam's Sons, 1998, ISBN 0-399-14393-9 (Originally published under the pen name "David Hunt")
- The Dream of the Broken Horses, Atria (imprint of Simon & Schuster,) 2002, ISBN 0-7434-0336-3
- City of Knives, Crossroad Press, 2013, ISBN 978-1-937530-37-2
- Hiding In The Weave, Crossroad Press, 2014, ISBN 978-1-937530-58-7
- The Luzern Photograph, Severn House, 2015, ISBN 978-0-7278-8546-3
- The Murals, Severn House, 2019, ISBN 978-0-7278-8973-7

=== Nonfiction ===
- Breaking Through, Selling Out, Dropping Dead & Other Notes On Filmmaking, Macmillan, 1971, revised 1989, ISBN 0-87910-123-7
- The Great Movies, a Ridge Press Book, Grosset & Dunlap, 1973, ISBN 0-448-22176-4
