= Bozbash =

Mutton stew associated with the Caucasus

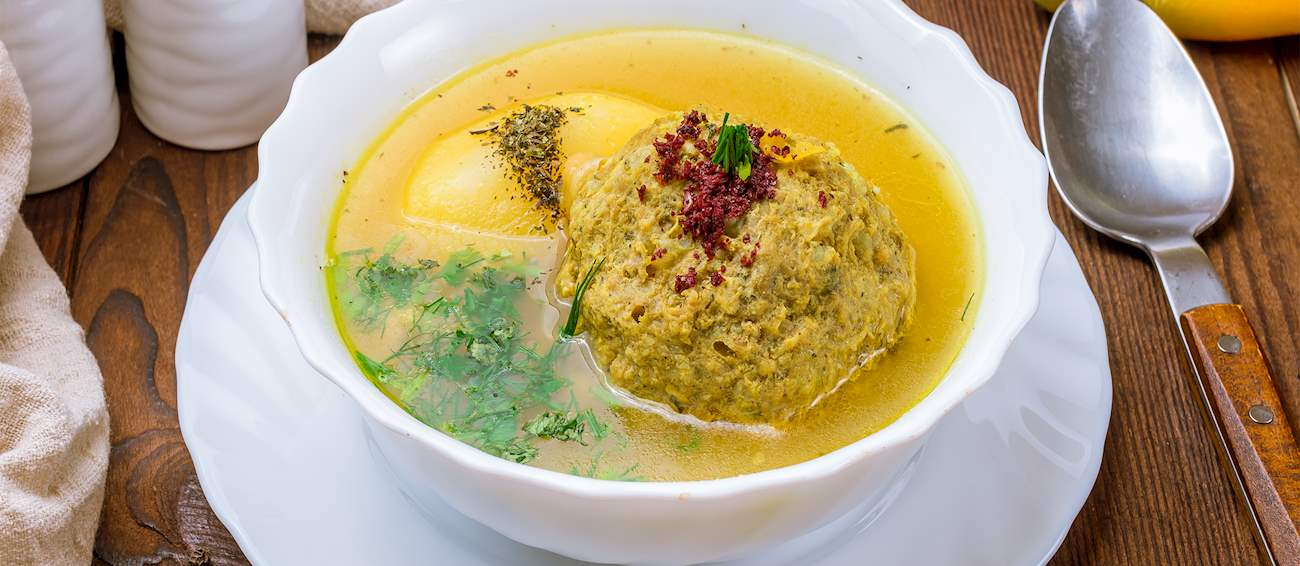
Küftə (meatball) bozbash

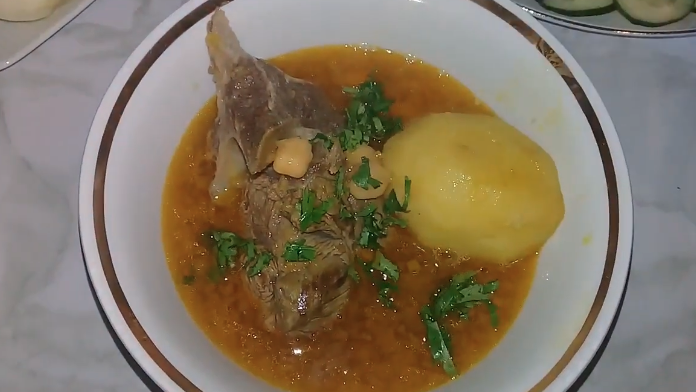
Tikə (chunky) bozbash

Bozbash (Armenian: բոզբաշ [bozˈbɑʃ]; Azerbaijani: bozbaş [bozˈbɑʃ]; Persian: آبگوشت بزباش) is a traditional meat stew (also described as a soup) that is popular in Armenia, Azerbaijan and Iran.

== History and etymology ==
Bozbash is a word of Azerbaijani origin. It may be derived from Azerbaijani boz (light gray) and bash (head), which in turn may point to the light color of the dish when it's cooked. The küftə (meatball) version of the dish resembles a gray head when cooked.

Bozbash is also the Azerbaijani name of the Iranian dish abgoosht-e sabzi. Ghanoonparvar notes that bozbash was introduced "relatively late" into Iranian cuisine; Mirza Ali-Akbar Khan, the chef of Naser al-Din Shah Qajar (r. 1848–1896), was reportedly the first to mention it. He classified it as part of a group of meat stews and soups, often eaten cold.

According to William Pokhlyobkin, bozbash is the most popular Armenian soup.

== Ingredients and preparation ==
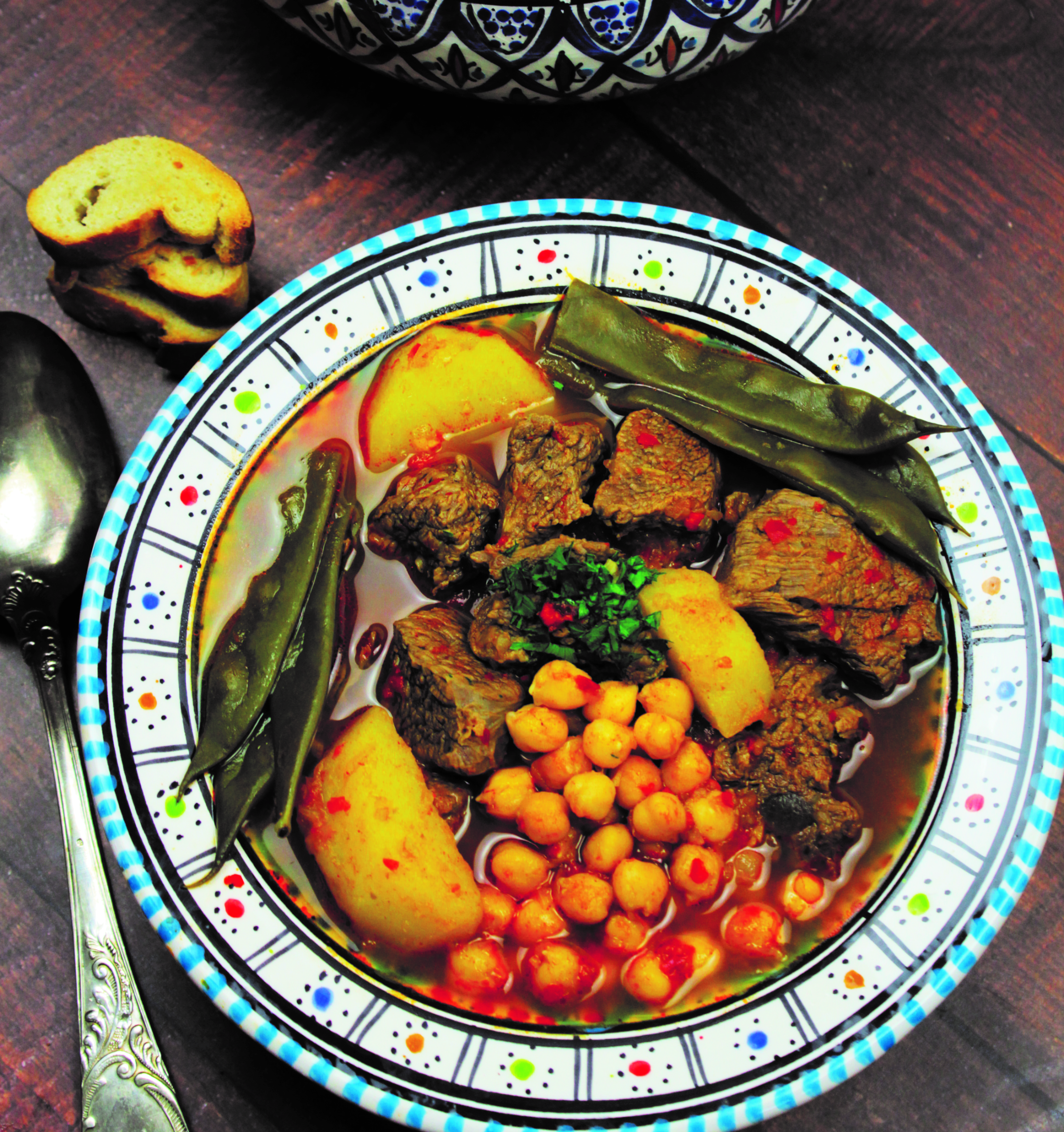
Bozbash in Armenian cuisine

In Azerbaijan, there are varieties of bozbash, such as küftə and tikə (or parça) bozbash, which is made from lamb or beef meat.

Alan Davidson describes bozbash in the Azerbaijani cuisine as:

Meatballs can be incorporated in the famous soup/stew called bozbash (see also Armenia), which exemplifies the tendency in the whole region [Caucasus] to create dishes which are on the frontier between soups and stews.

Ghanoonparvar notes in relation to bozbash:

It is made with meat (usually lamb), red or white beans, green vegetables, herbs (e.g., parsley, fenugreek, mint), onions and leeks, dried limes (līmū-ye ʿomānī), and spices (mainly salt, pepper, and turmeric). These ingredients are simmered together in water over low heat for several hours. As with most ābgūšts, when the ingredients are thoroughly cooked, the solids are usually removed and mashed to a pulp, known as gūšt-e kūbīde. The broth and the pulp are then served separately with flat bread and a pickled green-vegetable relish.

In Armenian cuisine, there is a variation rarely seen outside the Caucasus, shoushin bozbash, made from lamb, quince, apple, and mint. Other Armenian varieties include Sisian bozbash, Yerevan bozbash, Etchmiadzin bozbash, and winter bozbash.

== Sources ==
- Bender, David A. (2014). "Bozbash". A Dictionary of Food and Nutrition (4 ed.). Oxford University Press. ISBN 978-0191752391.
- Davidson, Alan (2014). Jaine, Tom (ed.). The Oxford Companion to Food (3 ed.). Oxford University Press. ISBN 978-0199677337.
- Ghanoonparvar, Mohammad R. (1989). "BOZBĀŠ". In Yarshater, Ehsan (ed.). Encyclopædia Iranica. Vol. IV/4: Bolbol I–Brick. London and New York: Routledge & Kegan Paul. p. 425. ISBN 978-0-71009-127-7.
