= Abgoosht =

Traditional and original Iranian stew and food

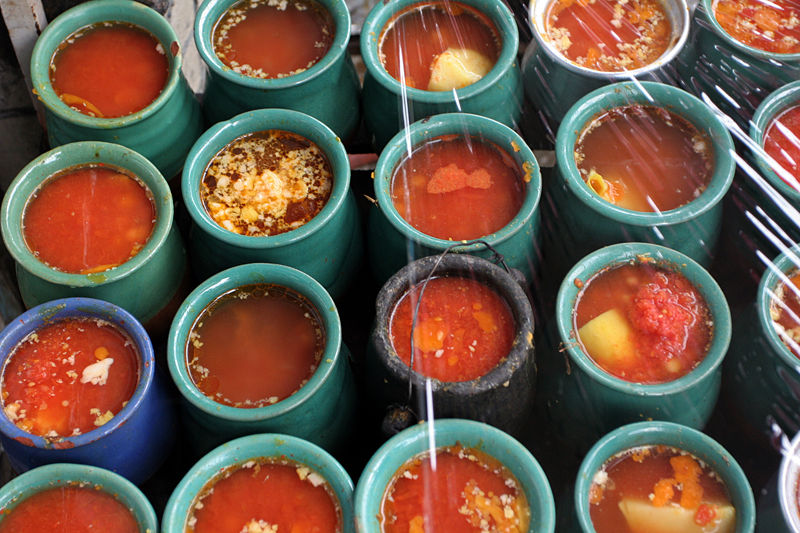
- Abgoosht in dizi pots
- Alternative names: Dizi, abgosht, abgusht, chainaki
- Course: Main course
- Place of origin: Iran (Ancient Persia)
- Region or state: Iran
- Associated cuisine: Iranian cuisine
- Created by: Iranians
- Main ingredients: lamb, chickpeas, white beans, onion, potatoes, and tomatoes, turmeric, and dried lime
- Food energy (per serving): 400 kcal (1,700 kJ)

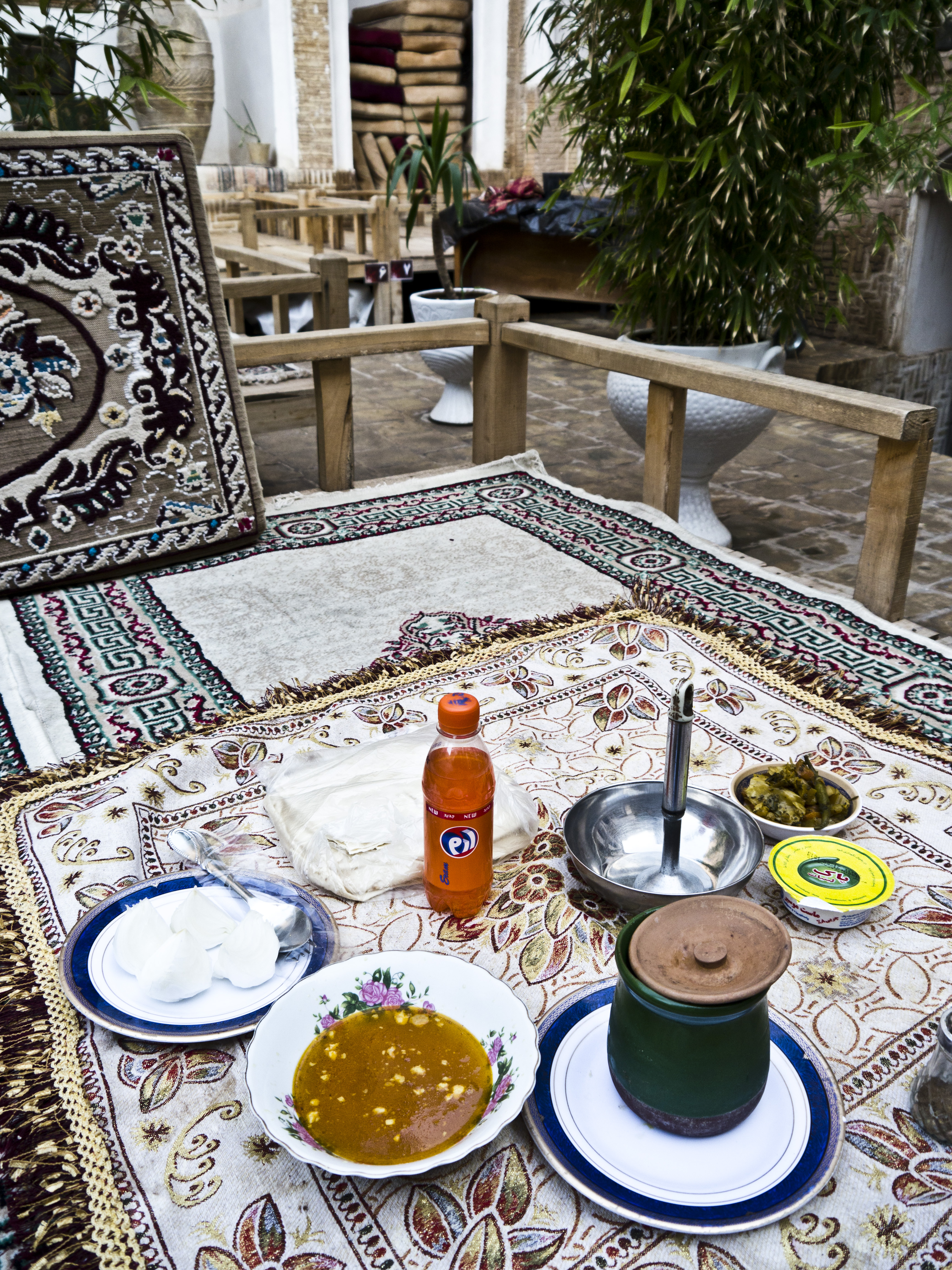
Abgoosht served at a traditional-style restaurant in Iran

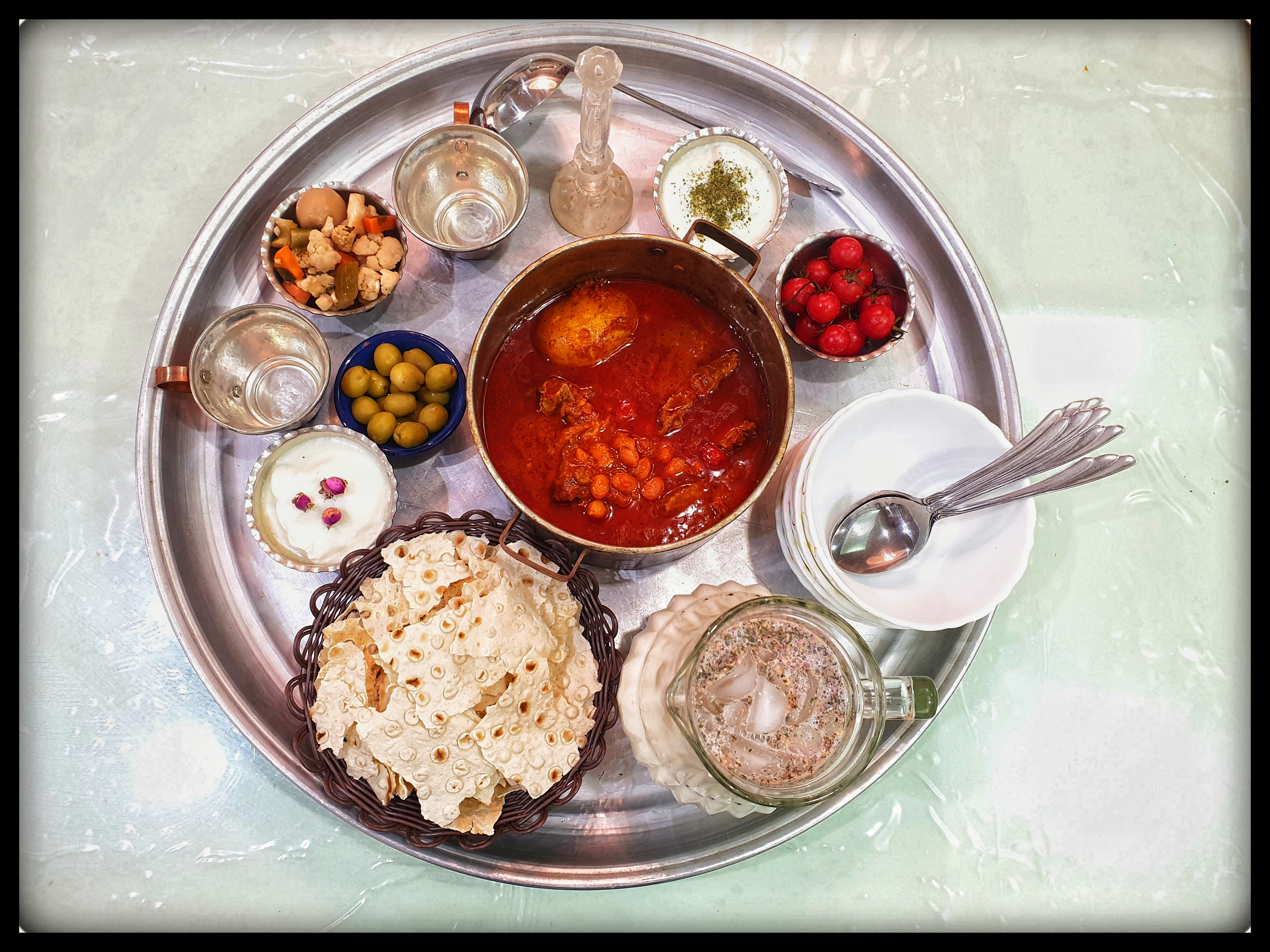
A dizi dish during consumption

Abgoosht or abgusht (Persian: آبگوشت Âbgušt, pronounced [ɒːbˈɡuːʃt]; literally "meat broth") is an Iranian stew. It is also called dizi (Persian: دیزی, pronounced [diːˈziː]), which refers to the traditional stoneware crocks it is served in. Some describe it as a "hearty mutton Persian soup thickened with chickpeas."

== Preparation ==
Ābgoosht is usually made with lamb, chickpeas, white beans, onion, potatoes, tomatoes, turmeric, and dried lime. Other variations exist in the beans used, such as kidney beans and black-eyed peas. The ingredients are combined and cooked until done, at which point the dish is strained. The solids are mashed as gusht kubideh (Persian: گوشت کوبیده, literally "mashed meat") which is desired in two stages; First, they eat its juice with pieces of bread or dried bread (for the useful use of dry bread) and the rest of the ingredients are eaten with a meat grinder completely beaten or unbeaten with bread, onions and seasonings such as pickles and vegetables. The popular Azerbaijani dish piti is a variety of abgoosht and encompasses many similar dishes in the region.

== Variations ==
=== Assyrian abgoosht ===
Assyrians of northwestern Iran, particularly surrounding Urmia, traditionally make abgoosht using beef, lime, kidney beans, and chickpeas, which is served in a lime broth with potatoes and eaten with onions and lavasha (an Assyrian bread) on the side. Assyrians typically make abgoosht in the winter. The regional pronunciation is "abgoosh", without the 't' (ܐܒܓܘܫ).

=== Armenian abgoosht ===
A similar dish in Armenia is also called abgoosht. The difference is that in Armenia beef rather than lamb is used.

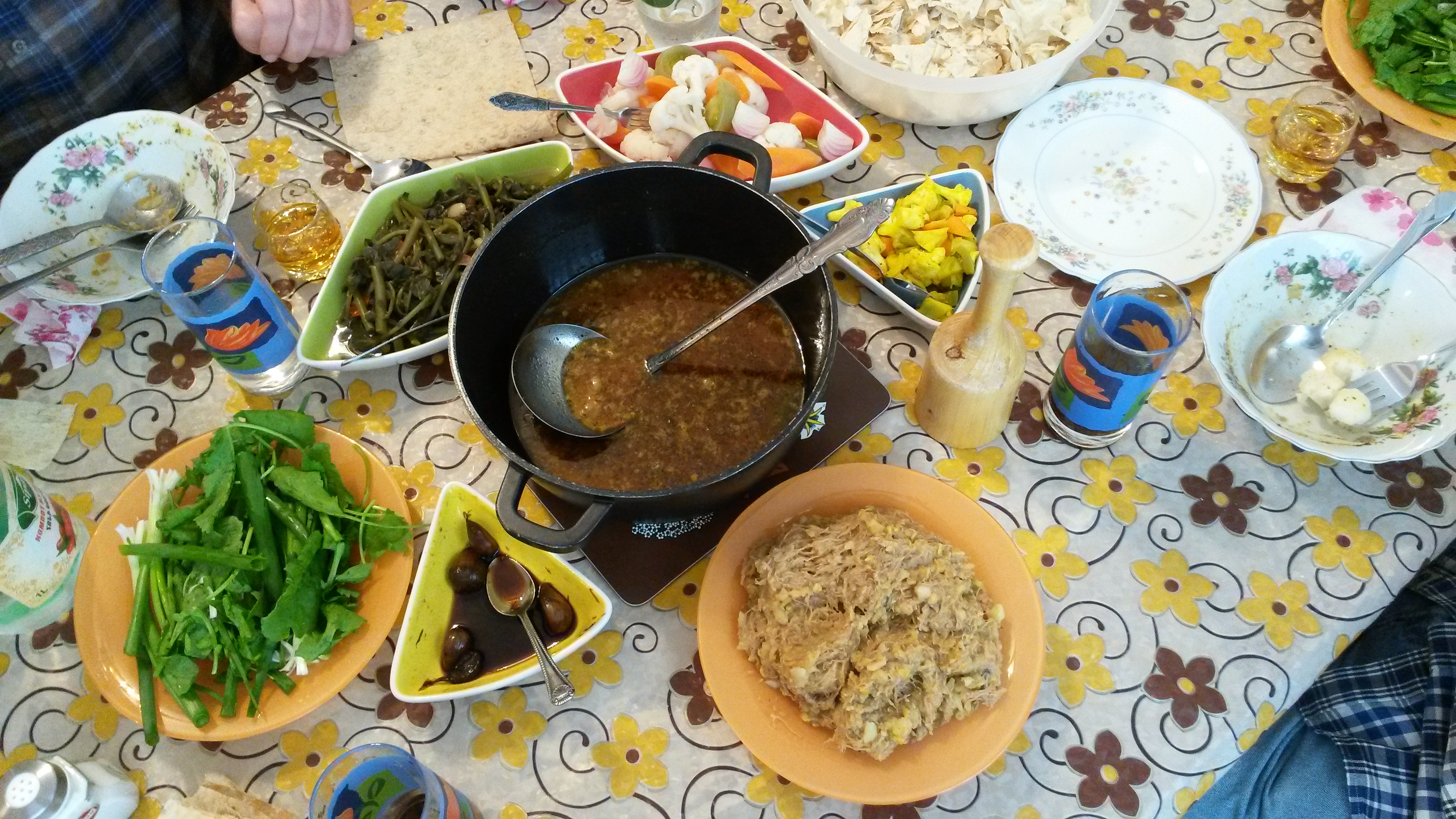
Abgoosht with various side dishes in Armenia

=== Piti (Caucasus) ===
Piti (or putuk) is a variation of abgoosht in the cuisines of the Caucasus and neighboring nations.

== See also ==
- Bozbash
- Armenian cuisine
- Assyrian cuisine
- Iranian cuisine
- Goulash
- List of lamb dishes
- Stock (food)
