= Chanakhi =

Traditional Georgian dish

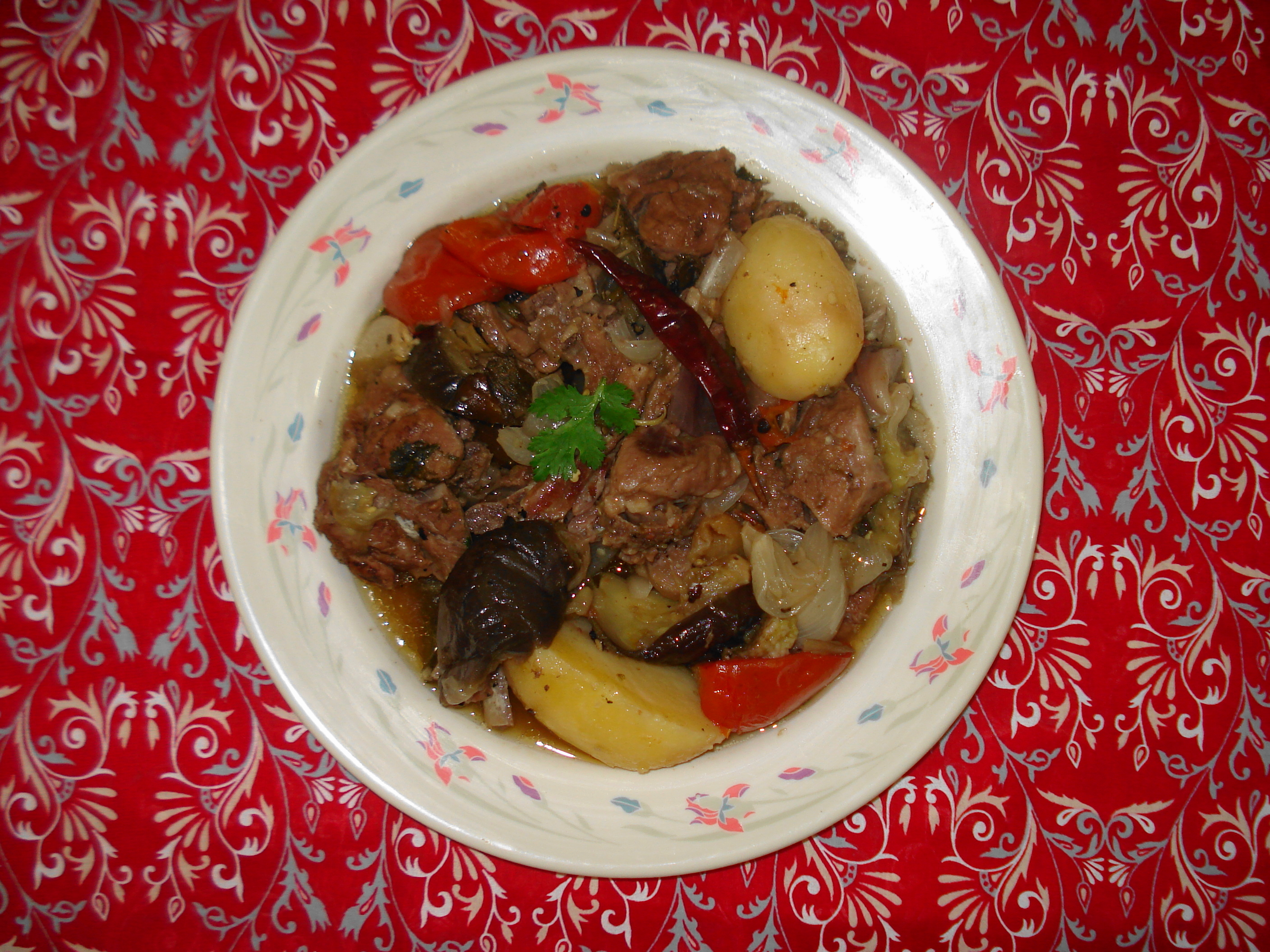
- Chanakhi
- Alternative names: Georgian: ჩანახი
- Type: Stew
- Course: Main course
- Place of origin: Georgia
- Serving temperature: Hot
- Main ingredients: Lamb, tomatoes, aubergines, potatoes, garlic, greens
- Other information: Traditionally prepared in individual clay pots

Chanakhi (Georgian: ჩანახი) is a traditional Georgian dish of lamb stew with tomatoes, aubergines, potatoes, greens, and garlic.

== Preparation ==
Chanakhi is preferably prepared in individual clay pots and served with bread and cheese. The lamb is placed in the pot with the already-melted butter. Onions, eggplants, potatoes, chopped greens, and tomatoes are added in separate layers. After pouring the water, the dish is cooked slowly in the oven for 4.5-5 hours.

== See also ==
- Chakapuli
- Piti
- Ghivetch
- Türlü
- List of lamb dishes
