= Todd Bender =

American sport shooter

- Born: Todd Bender

Todd Bender is an American skeet shooter from Alpharetta, Georgia. He attended Trinity University from 1979 to 1982, receiving a B.S. in Business Administration. He won three straight National Collegiate Shooting Championship titles, from 1979 through 1981, and was a member of the United States national team for competition at the 1979 and 1981 World Championships. While on the shooting team at Trinity, Todd received instruction from Trinity shooting coach, "Colonel" Tom Hanzel.

Over the years, he has compiled 26 NSSA World Championships and been named to a record 27 consecutive Men's First All-American Teams. He holds the highest average in skeet history, .9972 HOA Average on 5750 targets. In international competition, Todd won the Canadian Open in 1998, the English Open (UK) 2003, and the Australian Nationals in 2008.. Todd won the 2011 New Zealand 12g National Skeet (234/234), National Doubles (98) and O/A High Gun (247).

Todd was named the first Master Instructor for the National Skeet Shooting Association, has been trained by the UK's Clay Pigeon Shooting Association (CPSA) and is an Honorary Fellow in England's Institute of Clay Shooting Instructors. Todd is recognized as the leading authority in shooting instruction. For 15 years, his series of best-selling DVDs have set the standard for instructional shooting videos within the industry. Todd was inducted into the National Skeet Shooting Hall of Fame in 1999, and in the same year was inducted into the first class of Trinity University's Athletic Hall of Fame.

Today, Todd Bender is a shooting coach, and author articles on the subject for the Skeet Shooting Review, Shotgun Sports and Clay Shooting UK. Todd retired from competition after the world shoot in 2021.
