= Osvaldo Bender =

Brazilian politician (1934–2024)

Member of the Chamber of Deputies of Brazil for Rio Grande do Sul
- In office February 1987 – January 1995

Personal details
- Born: Osvaldo Afonso Bender; 1 August 1934 Santo Ângelo, Rio Grande do Sul, Brazil
- Died: 17 March 2024 (aged 89) Três Passos, Rio Grande do Sul, Brazil
- Party: PDS (1986–1993); PPR (1993–1995)
- Occupation: Businessman

Osvaldo Afonso Bender (1 August 1934 – 17 March 2024) was a Brazilian businessman and politician. A member of the Democratic Social Party and later the Reform Progressive Party, he served in the Chamber of Deputies from 1987 to 1995.

Bender died in Três Passos on 17 March 2024, at the age of 89.
