= Karides güveç =

Turkish shrimp dish

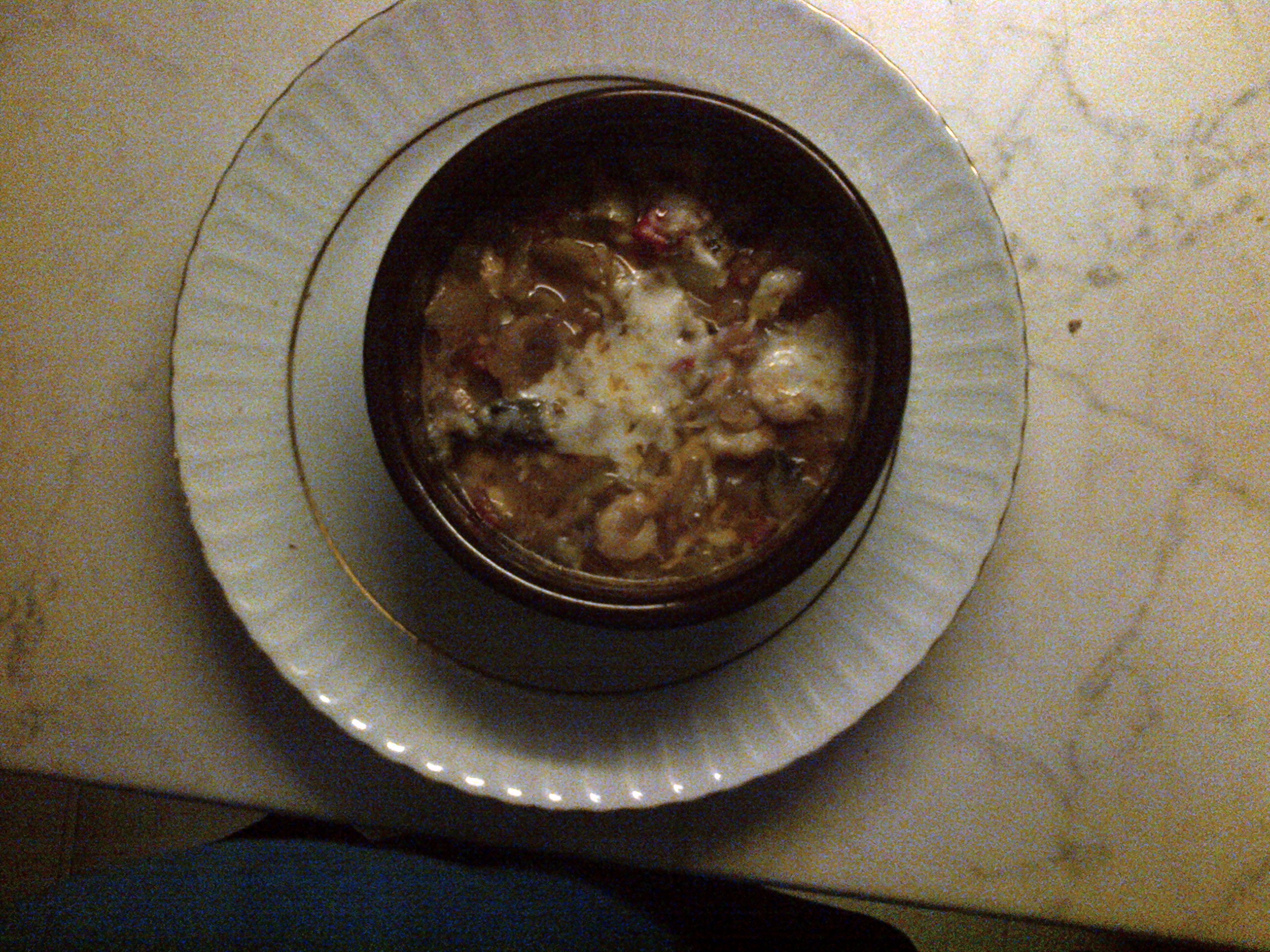
- Karides güveç
- Type: Casserole
- Place of origin: Turkey

Karides güveç is a shrimp dish in Turkish cuisine. It also contains tomato, tomato paste, garlic, onion, chili pepper and optionally mushroom. It is usually cooked and served in croks or relatively smaller sized güveçs, by adding melted kaşar on top of the dish.

It is consumed more commonly in meyhanes and birahanes (pubs) as well as houses and restaurants. It is considered an entrée.

== See also ==
- Midye dolma
- List of shrimp dishes
