= David A. Bender =

British writer and academic

Professor David A. Bender is an author and academic teaching nutrition and biochemistry. He is Professor of Nutritional Biochemistry at University College London, University College London; and Sub-Dean (Teaching) for the Royal Free and University College Medical School.

He is Executive Editor of the Journal of the Science of Food and Agriculture and author of the Oxford University Press publications A Dictionary of Food and Nutrition and Nutrition: A Very Short Introduction.
