= Ghivetch =

Traditional Balkan stew

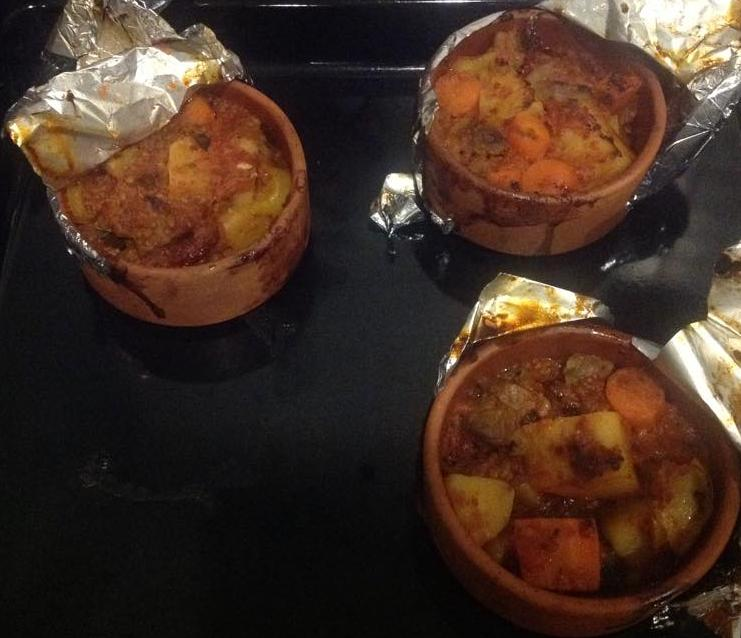
Ghivetch

Ghivetch (Bulgarian: гювеч, [ɟuˈvɛtʃ], Romanian: ghiveci, [ɡivet͡ʃʲ], Turkish: güveç, Serbo-Croatian: đuveč / ђувеч [ˈd͡ʑǔʋɛt͡ʃ], Macedonian: ѓувеч, [ˈɟuvɛtʃ]) is a traditional Balkan autumn vegetable stew most closely associated with Moldova, where it is a national dish. It is traditionally cooked in an earthenware pot called a güveç. It is often made only with vegetables, though some versions include meat, fish, or poultry. The Washington Post in 1985 called it "one of the world's great vegetable melanges". Mimi Sheraton called it "really the last word in vegetable stews".

== Origins ==
Ghivetch is known throughout the Balkans as a traditional autumn vegetable stew, but it is most closely associated with Moldova, Turkey and Bulgaria. It is a national dish of Moldova, where it is called ghiveci. It is a dish eaten by Danube Swabians.

== Ingredients ==
Ghivetch is often made only with vegetables, sometimes as many as 40, but versions exist that include meat, fish, poultry and dairy. In the Western Balkans it is often consumed with rice.

Mimi Sheraton, writing in the Wall Street Journal, described it as traditionally including "some pleasing pucker" from the inclusion of grape leaves or other sour ingredients such as sour salt, and paprika, either hot or sweet.

== Preparation and serving ==
Traditionally the stew is prepared in a clay pot called a güveç, duvech, or gyuvech; in Greece the pot is called a yiouvetsi. According to Paula Wolfert, the pot is "beloved for its ability to impart a great earthy taste and aroma". Traditionally the dish is assembled at home, then taken to a local bakery, and delivered to the customer by a delivery boy wearing a cushion on his head. Truck delivery has replaced the delivery boys. Some specialty bakeries allow customers to order ghivetch to be assembled by the bakery rather than by the customer at home; customers return the empty pot to the bakery.

Ghivetch can be served hot or cold. It is sometimes pureed. It is often garnished with sour cream or yogurt.

== Importance ==
The Washington Post in 1985 called it "one of the world's great vegetable melanges", along with Buddha's delight, ratatouille, and moussaka. The New York Times in 1977 specifically distinguished it as one of the mixed-vegetable stews characteristic of various cuisines. Sheraton called it "really the last word in vegetable stews" and included it in her book 1000 Foods to Eat Before You Die.

== Similar and related dishes ==
=== Related dishes ===
- Giouvetsi
- Karides güveç
- Türlü güveç

=== Other mixed-vegetable dishes ===
- Buddha's delight
- Lecsó
- Leipziger allerlei
- Locro de choclo
- Maque choux
- Moussaka
- Peperonata
- Pinakbet
- Ratatouille
- Succotash
