= Sóley Sesselja Bender =

Icelandic academic (born 1953)

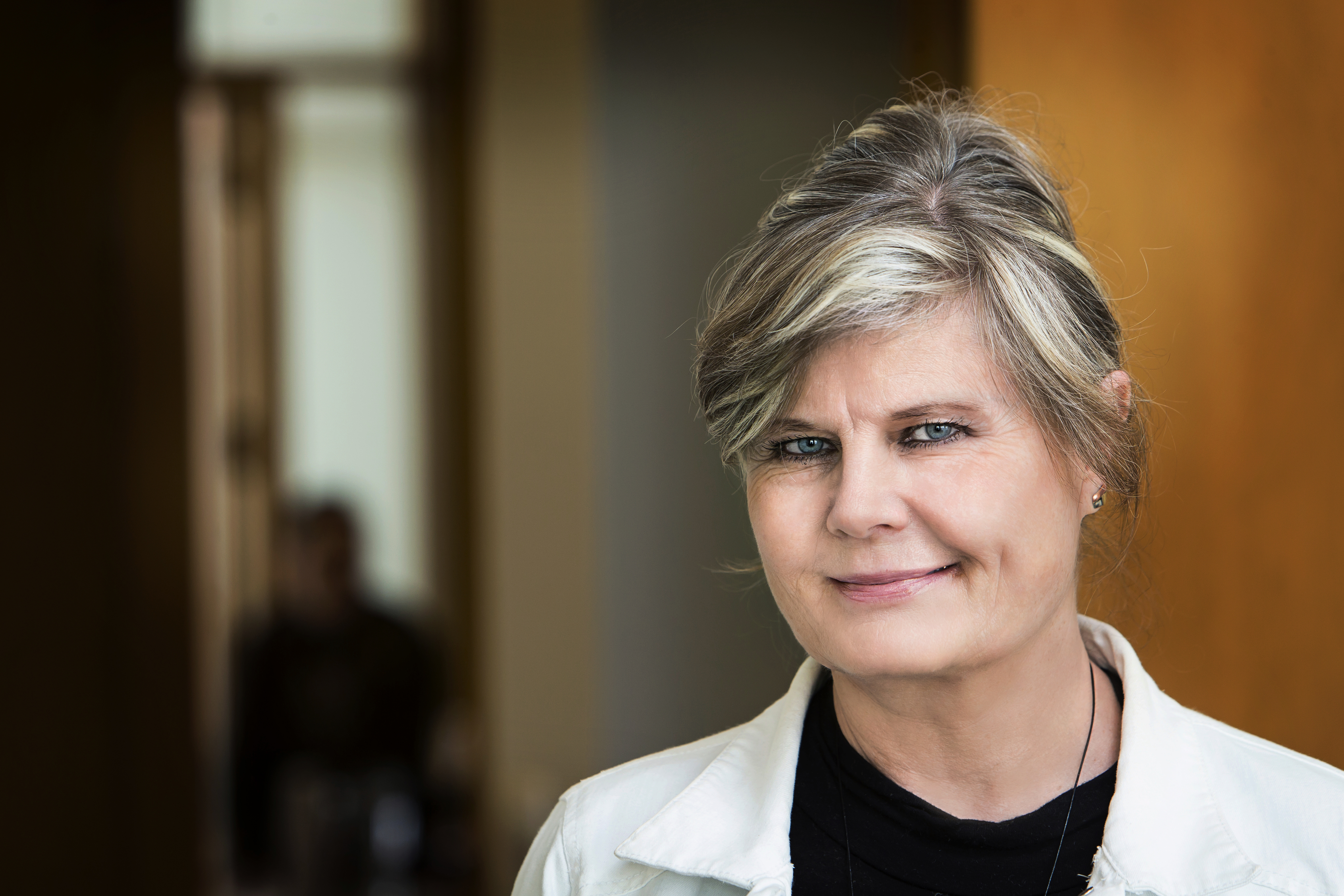
- Born: 26 July 1953 (age 73)
- Occupation: professor at the Faculty of Nursing of the University of Iceland

Sóley Sesselja Bender (born 26 July 1953) is a professor at the Faculty of Nursing of the University of Iceland. Her specialty is sexual and reproductive health, where she has worked for years on these health matters. She has pioneered in the development of teaching in the field of sexual and reproductive health, contraceptive counselling, and sexual and reproductive health policy formulation in Iceland and internationally.

== Professional experience ==
Sóley completed her matriculation examination from Menntaskólinn í Reykjavík (Junior College in Reykjavik) in 1973. That year she enrolled in the then new Nursing Programme at the University of Iceland. She graduated with a BS degree in Nursing in 1977, thus becoming one of the first nurses in Iceland with this degree. After completing studies, she taught epidemiology and family planning at the Shanta Bhawan Nursing School in Kathmandu, Nepal (1978–1979), worked from 1979 to 1980 in the Emergency Room of City Hospital in Reykjavik and a year in the Surgical Ward of St. Mary's Hospital in Minneapolis. In 1981 she became a licensed nurse in Minnesota. She completed an MS degree in Family Planning Administration from the Department of Obstetrics and Gynecology within Medical School of the University of Minnesota in 1983. From 1985 to 1986, she was Director of Nursing of the National University Hospital's Maternity and Gynaecology Department. In 1985, she began teaching nursing part-time at the University of Iceland and became a professor in 2009 at the Faculty of Nursing. Sóley completed a doctoral programme in Health Sciences at the University of Iceland's Faculty of Medicine in 2005. Her dissertation dealt with adolescent pregnancies. Sóley was Director of Nursing Studies from 1994 to 1995 and the Dean of the Faculty of Nursing from 2007 to 2009. She was an affiliate faculty at the University of Minnesota's Department of Nursing from 2009 to 2012. In 2007 she was licensed to practice in Iceland as a Specialist in Sexual- and Reproductive Health

== Confidential, social, and academic work ==
In 1985, Sóley helped found the Icelandic Sexology Association. She founded the Icelandic Association for Sexual and Reproductive Health in 1992 and chaired it the first eight years. At that time, the association became a full-fledged member of the International Planned Parenthood Federation (IPPF). Under the auspices of the Icelandic Directorate of Health and in collaboration with the Ministry of Education, Science and Culture, Sóley supervised interdisciplinary work culminating in the first comprehensive sexuality education program, "Sex Education, Life Values, and Decisions". This was introduced in the upper grades of compulsory schools throughout Iceland in 1991, and she also edited the Icelandic version. Sóley has collaborated for years with the European region of WHO on sexual and reproductive health. She was a regional advisor in this field within the European region from 2007 to 2013. In addition, as a representative of the Ministry of Welfare, she was in a group preparing an action plan for sexual and reproductive health in Europe. This plan entered into force in 2016. For many years, Sóley has answered queries on the University of Iceland's Science Web. Sóley has served on many committees and in positions of confidentiality outside the Faculty of Nursing. Through the years, she has chaired many committees under the auspices of the Ministry of Welfare and the Ministry of Health and written explanatory reports for parliamentary bills. Noteworthy in this regard is her chairing of a committee preparing an explanatory report on a comprehensive review of Act no. 25/1975 on information and counselling on sexuality and reproduction and abortions and sterilisation. In 2019, the Directorate of Health founded the first Professional Council on Sexual and Reproductive Health, and Sóley is one of its representatives.

== Research ==
Sóley's research has dealt with sexual and reproductive health and especially focused on sexuality education for youths, sexual and reproductive health services, adolescent pregnancy, sexual behaviour of youths, contraceptive use and sexuality during pregnancy and after birth. She has also been developing the screening instrument HEILUNG. Its purpose is to check the health of young people, including sexual and reproductive health. Sóley was a co-researcher in The International Sexuality Description Project 2 (ISDP-2). Sóley has written many scientific articles and chapters in books on sexual and reproductive health. She has given many lectures on sexual and reproductive health at domestic as well as international scientific conferences.

== Teaching ==
Sóley has developed teaching on sexual and reproductive health for students in nursing and midwifery. She organised the development and founding of an inter-disciplinary diploma program in sexology at the University of Iceland and has been its director since it started in 2010. She chaired a steering committee from 2010 to 2017 that developed and implemented the first interdisciplinary curriculum for students in the University of Iceland's School of Health Sciences.

== Personal life ==
Sóley is married to Friðrik Kristján Guðbrandsson, specialist in Otolaryngology-Head and Neck Surgery, and they have three children. Sóley's parents were Kristján S. Bender, author (1915–1975) and Þorbjörg Þórarinsdóttir Bender, nurse (1914–1994).

== Main written works ==
=== Articles ===
- Sóley S. Bender (2019). Ráðgjöf um getnaðarvarnir á Kvennadeild Landspítalans í 20 ár. Ljósmæðrablaðið, 97(1), 20–24.
- Schmitt, D.P., Alcalay, L., Allik, J., Alves, I.C.B., Anderson, C.A., Angelini, A.L. Asenorpf, J.B., Austers, I., Balaguer, I., Baptista, A. og Bender, S.S. et al. (alls 190 höfundar). (2017). Narcissism and the Strategic Pursuit of Short-Term Mating: Universal Links across 11 World Regions of the International Sexuality Description Project-2. Psychological Topics, 26, 1, 89-137
- Bender, S.S. og Fulbright, K. (2013). Content analysis: A review of perceived barriers to sexual and reproductive health services by young people. The European Journal of Contraception and Reproductive Health Care, 18, 159–167.
- Sóley S. Bender (2006). Kynlífsheilbrigði: Þörf fyrir stefnumótun. Tímarit hjúkrunarfræðinga, 4(82), 52–56.
- Bender, S.S. og Kosunen, E. (2005). Teenage contraceptive use in Iceland: A gender perspective. Public Health Nursing, 22(1), 17–26.
- Bender, SS og Geirsson, RT (2004). Effectiveness of pre-abortion counseling on post-abortion contraceptive use. Contraception, 69:481-487.
- Bender, S.S., Geirsson, R.T. og Kosunen, E. (2003). Trends in teenage fertility, abortion and pregnancy rates in Iceland compared with other Nordic countries 1976-99. Acta Obstet Gynecol Scand, 82, 38–47.

=== Original writings on teaching ===
- Sóley S. Bender, Guðbjörg Edda Hermannsdóttir og Solveig Jóhannsdóttir (2011). Ungt fólk og kynlíf. Reykjavík: Háskólaprent. Ætlað til kennslu í framhaldsskólum.
- Sóley S. Bender (2010). Kynveruleiki í ljósi kynheilbrigðis. Kynfræðsluefni fyrir 8. bekk grunnskólans. Tilraunaútgáfa til forprófunar.
- Sóley S. Bender, Guðbjörg Edda Hermannsdóttir og Solveig Jóhannsdóttir (2001). Ungt fólk og heilbrigt kynlíf. Reykjavík: Fræðslusamtök um kynlíf og barneignir. Útgáfa fyrir tilraunakennslu. Ætlað til kennslu í framhaldsskólum.
- Sóley S. Bender (1989). ALNÆMISVARNIR. Fræðsluefni og leiðbeiningar fyrir framhaldsskóla. Reykjavík: Heilbrigðis-og tryggingamálaráðuneytið og menntamálaráðuneytið.
- Sóley S. Bender (1988). ALNÆMISVARNIR Fræðsluefni og leiðbeiningar fyrir efstu bekki grunnskóla. Reykjavík: Heilbrigðis-og tryggingamálaráðuneytið og menntamálaráðuneytið.
