= Paula Wolfert =

American food author specialised in Mediterranean, and in particular Moroccan, cuisine

- Born: April 7, 1938 (age 88); Brooklyn, New York, U.S.
- Education: Columbia University (1959)
- Occupation: Author
- Spouse: William Bayer
- Children: 2
- Relatives: Eleanor Perry (mother-in-law)
- Writing career
- Subject: Cooking

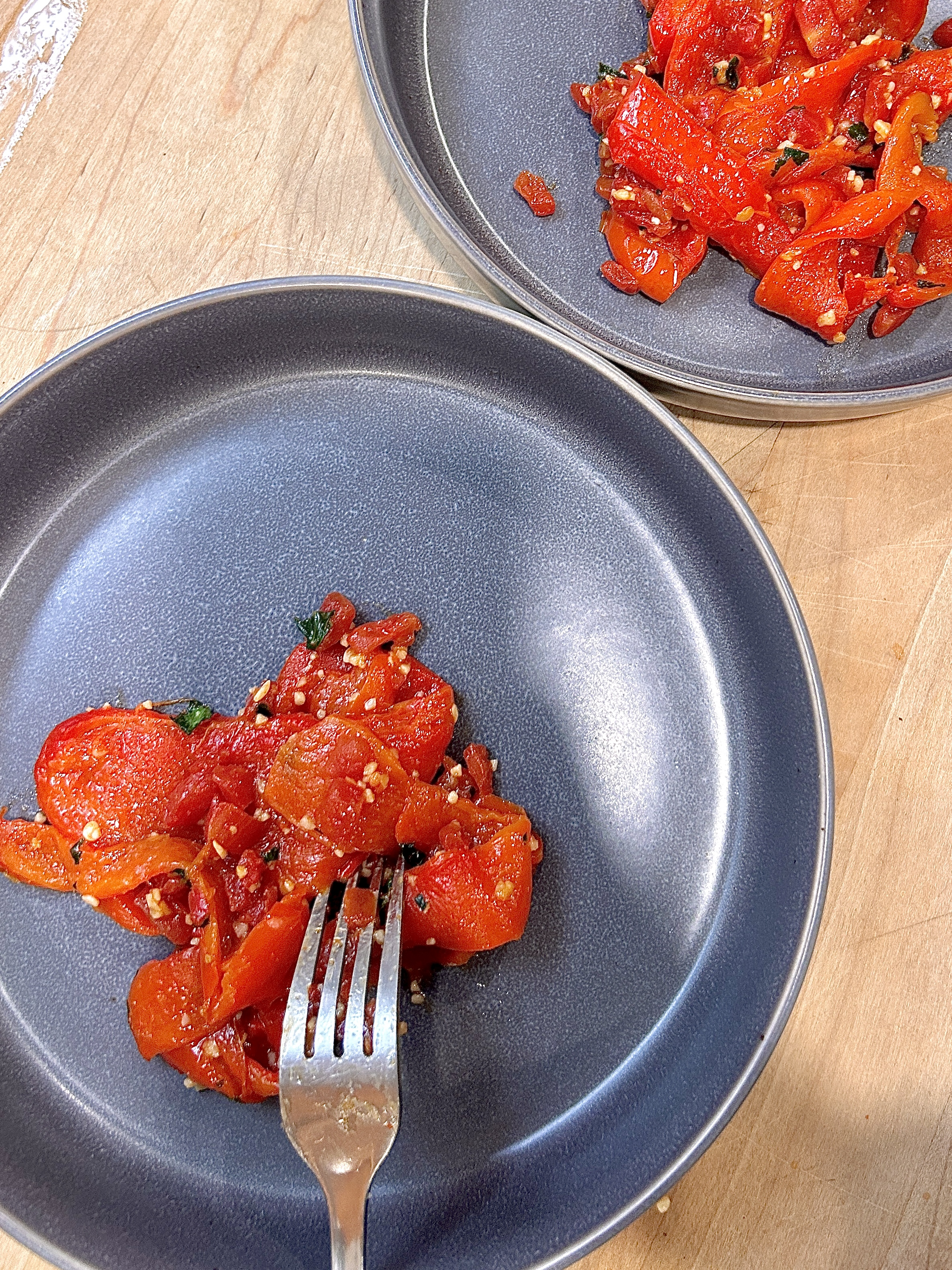
Moroccan grilled red pepper salad from "The Food of Morocco" by Paula Wolfert.

Paula Miriam Wolfert (née Harris; born April 7, 1938) is an American author of nine books on cooking and the winner of numerous cookbook awards including what is arguably the top honor given in the food world: The James Beard Foundation Medal For Lifetime Achievement. A specialist in Mediterranean food, she has written extensively on Moroccan cuisine including two books, one of them (The Food of Morocco) a 2012 James Beard Award winner. She also wrote The Cooking of South-West France, and books about the cuisine of the Eastern Mediterranean, slow Mediterranean cooking and Mediterranean clay pot cooking.

== Early and personal life ==
Wolfert was born April 7, 1938, in Brooklyn, New York, daughter of Sam and Frieda Harris. She attended Columbia University in New York between 1956 and 1959, earning a degree in English. During that time, her mother gave her a series of six lessons with Dione Lucas, an English chef who ran a cooking school in New York. "I loved it," she said. "I loved it better than school. I grew up on cottage cheese and melon, and my mother was on a diet her whole life. She had no interest in food."

She is married to crime fiction writer William Bayer and is the mother of two children, Nicholas and Leila.

== Alzheimer's activist ==
In late 2013 she said that she had been diagnosed with MCI (Mild Cognitive Impairment), an early stage of Alzheimer's disease. She told The Washington Post that she had stopped teaching and culinary writing in order to devote herself completely to Alzheimer's activism: speaking out about the disease, urging people who suspect that they may have it to get tested, and asserting her belief that "denial is not a viable option." Also in 2013 she was featured in a segment on the PBS NewsHour in which she spoke about her role as an Alzheimer's activist.

== Biography ==
A biography, Unforgettable, The Bold Flavors of Paula Wolfert's Renegade Life by Emily Kaiser Thelin, was published in early April 2017. This publication received considerable comment in The New York Times, The Washington Post, The San Francisco Chronicle, and other publications.

== Critical commentary ==
In a review of Wolfert's Mediterranean Grains and Greens, Nicholas Lemann wrote in Slate: "The dream of every artist is to be a genius who is also wildly popular, but the way it usually works out is that there is an inexact fit between giftedness and broad appeal. Every one of the arts has a spectrum of esteem with the rich and unrespected at one end, the difficult and audience-less at the other, and most people somewhere in between. This is no less true in cookbook writing than it is in literature or painting or music. In the foodie world, the William Gaddis, the Ad Reinhardt, the John Cage, the inaccessible deity, is Paula Wolfert. A cynic might take Wolfert, and Wolfert fans like me, for reverse snobs, down-homing to mask the fundamental one-upmanship. But this would be vile calumny. Wolfert is merely a perfectionist and a visionary, and such people should be our heroes."

Of her book The Cooking of Southwest France, Alice Waters wrote: "A true culinary zealot, Paula Wolfert champions forgotten dishes, uncovers regional cooking in surprising places, and reminds us of our resources and roots. In writing about the earthy food of France's Southwest, she teaches us how to cook foods that are traditional, slow and sustainable." Of the same book, French Laundry chef Thomas Keller wrote: "Americans have only recently come to know what the people of Southwest France have known for generations--that the key to great cooking is in its simplicity and depth of flavor. In this book, Paula has taught us to fully enjoy each bite, to share our joy through the food we cook and serve."

== Awards ==
- May, 2018, Wolfert received the James Beard Foundation Award for Lifetime Achievement.
- The 2013 IACP (International Association of Cooking Professionals) Culinary Classics Book Award and the 2008 James Beard Foundation Cookbook Hall Of Fame Award for her first book Couscous and Other Good Food from Morocco.
- The 1983 French's Tastemaker Award for her The Cooking of South-West France. This book was also a finalist for the British Andre Simon Award.
- The 1988 Cook's Magazine Platinum Award for Best American Cookbook for her Paula Wolfert's World of Food.
- The 1994 IACP Julia Child Award for Best International Cookbook and the 1994 James Beard Award for Best International Cookbook for her The Cooking of the Eastern Mediterranean.
- The 1996 M. F. K. Fisher Award for her Saveur Magazine article "Return To Morocco."
- The 1999 James Beard Award for Best International Cookbook and the 1999 Food&Wine "Best of the Best" Cookbook Award for her Mediterranean Grains and Greens.
- The 1998 Salon International Livre du Gourmand Award for Lifetime Achievement.
- The 2004 IACP Julia Child Award for Best International Cookbook for The Slow Mediterranean Kitchen: Recipes of a Passionate Cook.
- The 2012 James Beard Award for Best International Cookbook for The Food of Morocco. This book was also a finalist for the British Andre Simon Award.

== Bibliography ==
- Couscous and Other Good Food from Morocco, Harper & Row 1973, ISBN 0-06-014721-0
- Mediterranean Cooking, Quadrangle/The New York Times 1977, revised HarperPerennial 1994, ISBN 0-81-290660-8
- The Cooking Of South-West France, Dial Press 1983, revised Wiley 2005, ISBN 0-38-527463-7
- Paula Wolfert's World of Food, Harper & Row 1988, ISBN 0-06-015955-3
- The Cooking of the Eastern Mediterranean, HarperCollins 1994, ISBN 0-06-016651-7
- Mediterranean Grains and Greens, HarperCollins 1998, ISBN 0-06-017251-7
- The Slow Mediterranean Kitchen, Wiley 2003, ISBN 0-471-26288-9
- Mediterranean Clay Pot Cooking, Wiley 2009, ISBN 978-0-7645-7633-1
- The Food of Morocco, Ecco 2011, ISBN 978-0-0619-5755-0
