= Pisto =

Spanish dish

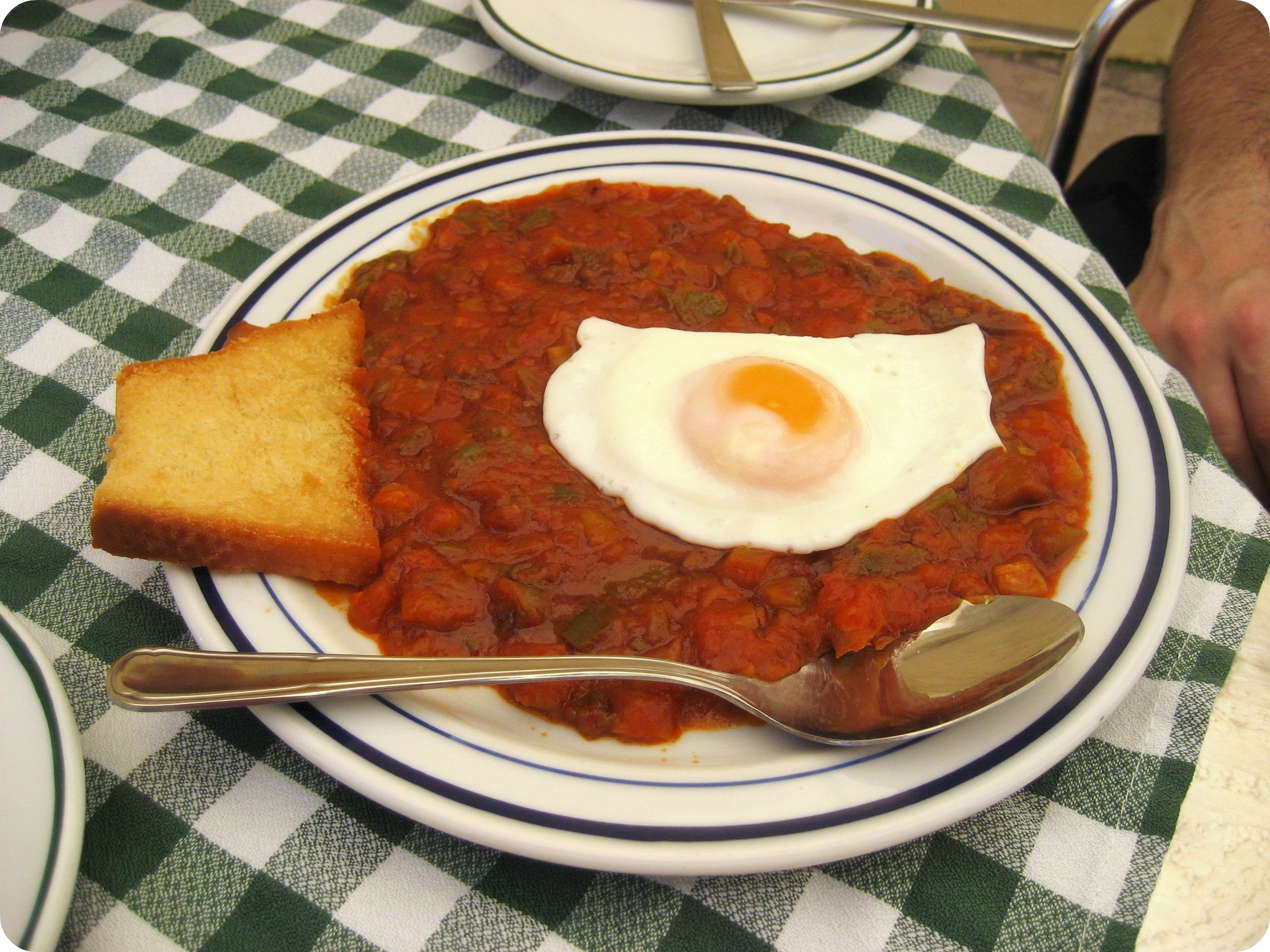
- Alternative names: Pisto manchego
- Type: Stew
- Place of origin: Spain
- Region or state: La Mancha
- Serving temperature: Warm
- Main ingredients: Tomatoes, onions, eggplants or courgettes, green and red peppers, olive oil

Pisto (also known as pisto manchego) is a Spanish dish originally from the Region of Murcia, Castilla–La Mancha and Extremadura. It is made of tomatoes, onions, eggplant or courgettes, green and red peppers, and olive oil. It is usually served warm as a starter or to accompany another dish. It is often served with white rice, bread, a fried egg on top or with pieces of cured ham. It is also used as the filling for empanadas and tartlets (empanadillas).

The dish is sometimes formally named pisto manchego, from its origins in the historical region of La Mancha (mostly situated in the region of Castilla–La Mancha); it is also found in similar versions in Extremadura (pisto extremeño). Pisto a la bilbaína, from Bilbao in the Basque Country, is similar to pisto manchego but usually includes only courgettes and green peppers in tomato sauce, sometimes lightly scrambled with eggs.

== See also ==
- Galayet bandora (the Levant)
- Huevos rancheros (Mexico)
- Lecsó (Hungary)
- Matbukha (North West Africa)
- Menemen (Turkey)
- Piperade (Gascon/French/Basque)
- Shakshouka (the Mediterranean and Middle East)
- Ratatouille
