= Huevos al albañil =

Mexican breakfast dish

Huevos al albañil (“bricklayer eggs”) is a Mexican cuisine breakfast dish of eggs, garlic, tomatoes, and chile de árbol. Huevos al albañil are usually served with refried beans and corn tortillas. In Mexico City, it is typically served in salsa verde, and in Oaxaca, it is prepared as an egg omelet smothered in spicy sauce and flavored with epazote. Occasionally, the dish is also accompanied by slices of panela cheese, strips of poblano pepper, crema, or chopped onion.

It is named for construction workers, who need a dish that is quick and easy to make on-the-go with rudimentary utensils.

== See also ==
- List of egg dishes
- List of Mexican dishes
- Huevos motuleños
- Huevos rancheros
- Menemen
- Shakshouka
- Stir-fried tomato and scrambled eggs
- Strapatsada
