= Strapatsada =

Popular dish in many regions of Greece

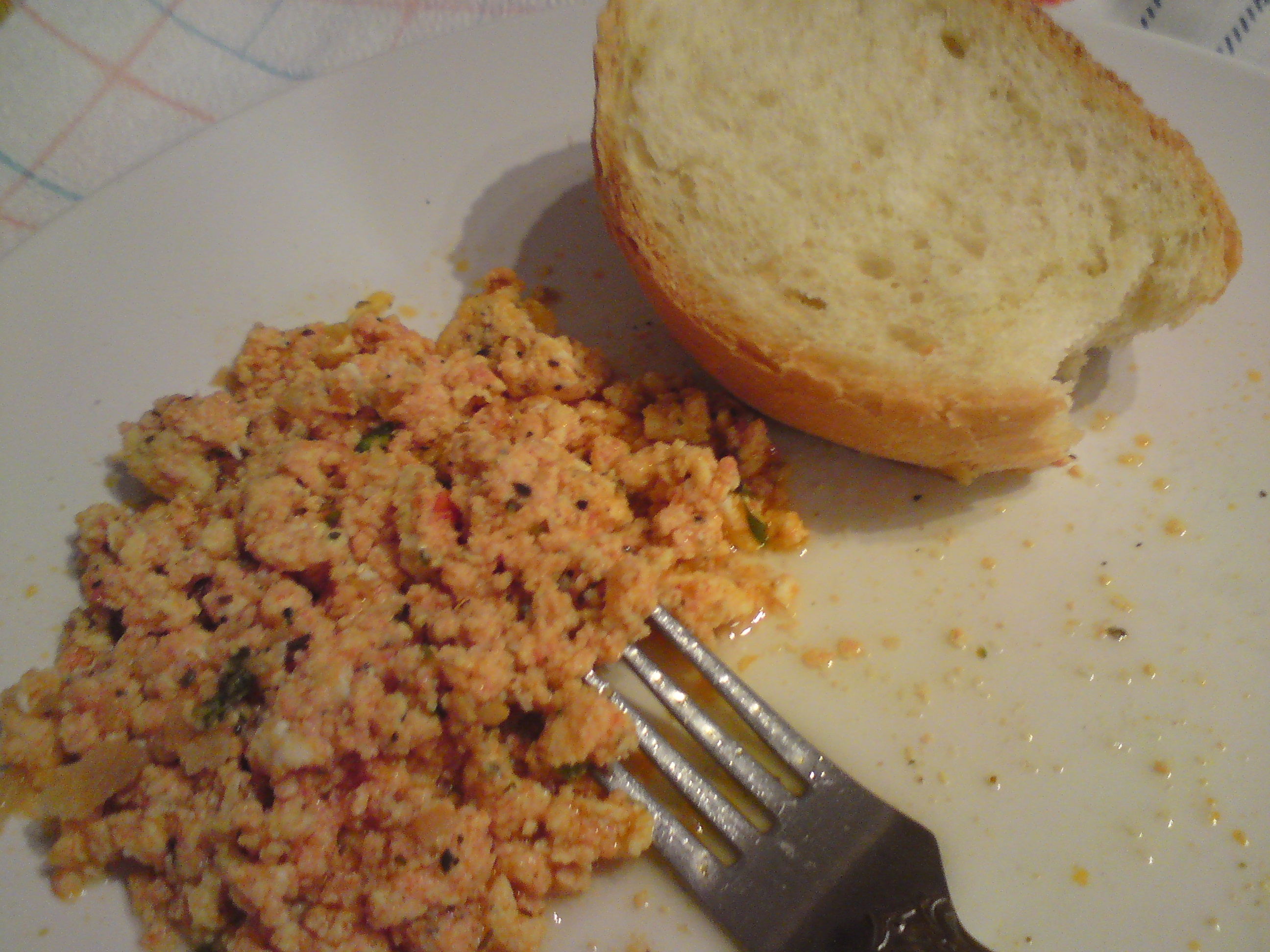
- Strapatsada served plain with fresh bread.
- Alternative names: Kagianas
- Course: Breakfast or snack
- Place of origin: Greece
- Serving temperature: Hot or cold
- Main ingredients: Fresh tomatoes, eggs and olive oil
- Ingredients generally used: Feta cheese

Strapatsada (Greek: στραπατσάδα) is a popular dish in many regions of Greece, especially the Ionian Islands, due to the availability and low cost of its ingredients (fresh tomatoes, eggs and olive oil). It is often prepared "on the spot" and served for lunch or a light snack; however, it can also be served cold. The dish is also known as kagianas, koskosela (in Cyclades) or menemeni.

Preparing strapatsada is quick and easy: the chopped or pureed tomatoes are cooked in a frying pan with olive oil and pepper until they become a thick sauce. The beaten eggs are then added to the sauce and scrambled. Feta cheese can optionally be added just before turning off the heat (salt is usually not necessary if feta is used). Oregano, thyme or other dried herbs are often added as seasoning.

The dish is especially popular in the summer, when fresh tomatoes abound. The name comes from the Italian word "strapazzare" which means breaking an egg and mix it all while cooking.

Sometimes, especially in the Peloponnese, Strapatsada is made like shakshouka, in which the tomatoes are fried, and eggs are poached in the tomatoes, although this practice is quite rare.

== See also ==
- Shakshouka
- Scrambled eggs
- Piperade
- Menemen (food)
- Huevos rancheros
