= Sataraš =

Vegetable stew

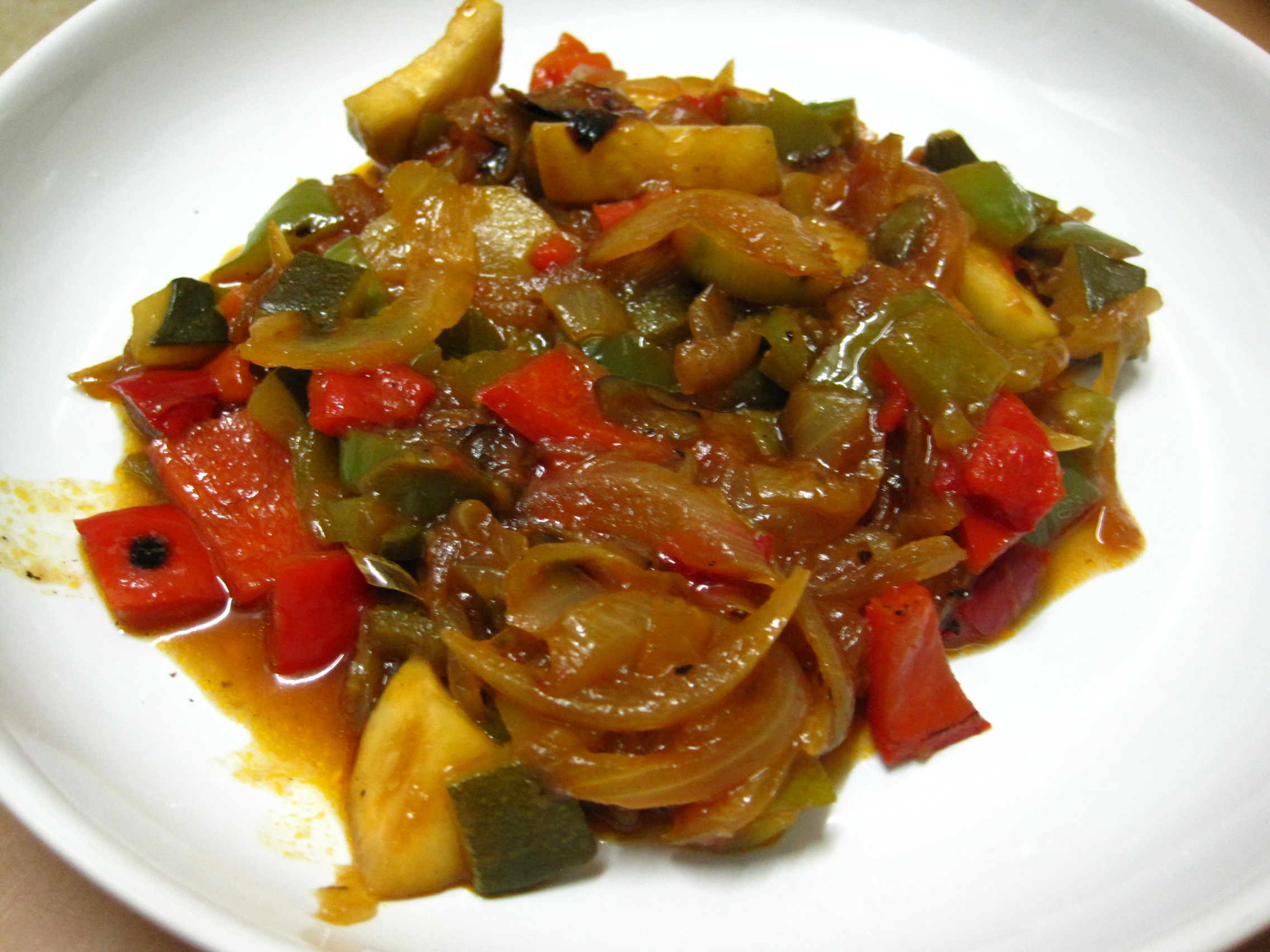
- Type: Stew
- Course: Main course
- Region or state: Bosnia and Herzegovina, Croatia, Serbia
- Serving temperature: Hot
- Main ingredients: Vegetables (bell peppers, tomatoes, onions)

Sataraš is a light vegetable stew made of bell peppers, tomatoes, onions and condiments that is popular throughout Southeast Europe.

It is very similar to a Hungarian dish, lecsó, and a Turkish dish, menemen, from which this stew may have descended during the Ottoman imperial period.

== See also ==
- Bosnian cuisine
- Croatian cuisine
- Serbian cuisine
- Matbucha
- Peperonata
