= Menemen (food) =

Turkish tomato and egg dish similar to shakshouka

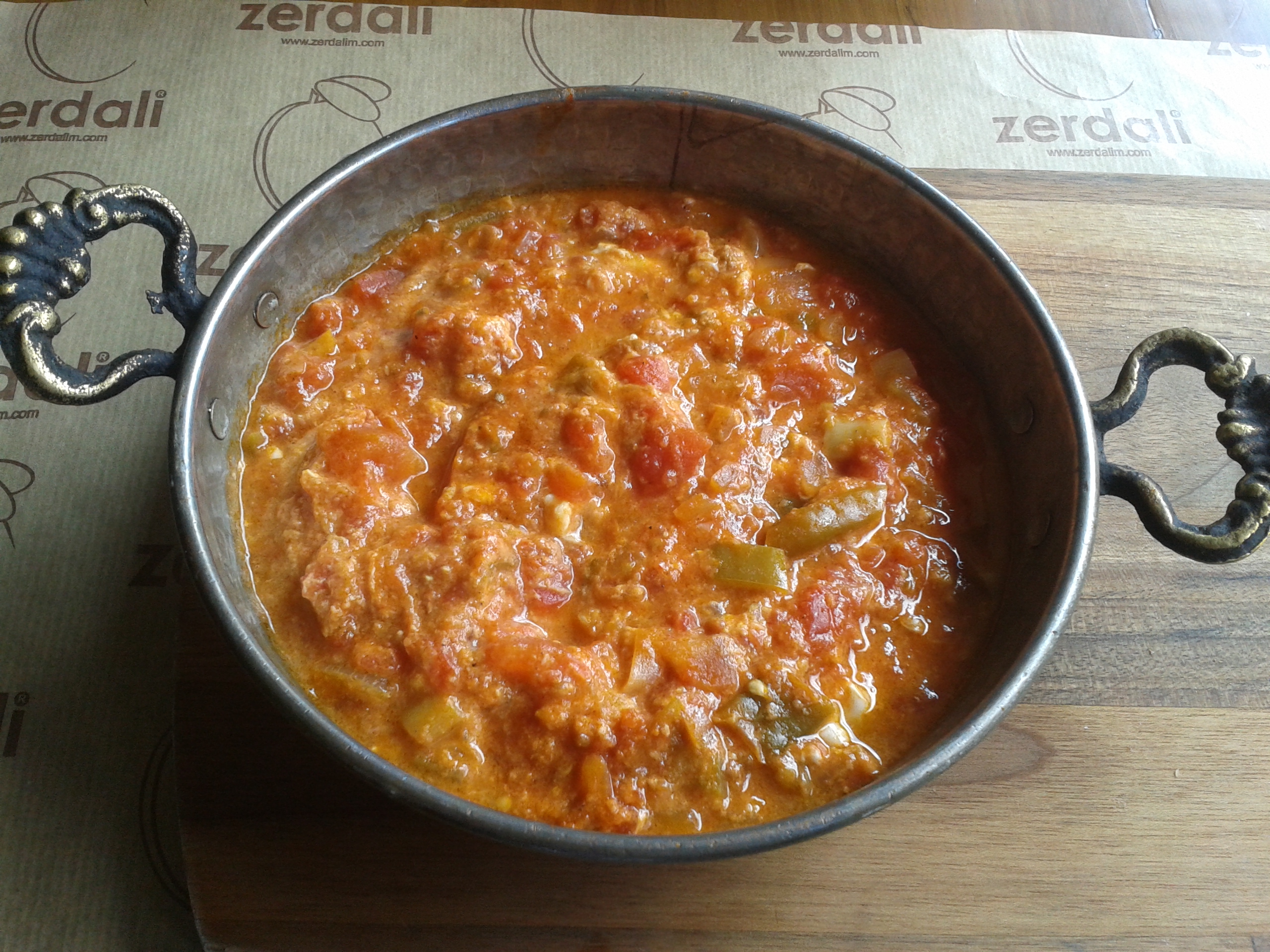
- Menemen in a sahan
- Course: Breakfast
- Place of origin: Turkey
- Region or state: Menemen, İzmir Province
- Created by: Cretan Muslims
- Main ingredients: Eggs, tomato, green peppers, and spices such as ground black and red pepper, salt and oregano, onion, garlic, chili powder
- Food energy (per serving): 120 kcal (500 kJ)
- Similar dishes: Shakshouka, piperade

Menemen is a popular traditional Turkish dish that includes eggs, tomato, green peppers, and spices such as ground black and red pepper cooked in olive oil. Menemen is commonly eaten for breakfast and served with bread. Its name originates from Menemen, a small town in İzmir Province. Menemen may be made with onions, but the addition of onions is often debated and is more common when the dish is eaten as a main dish, rather than at breakfast.

Menemen is similar to the Hungarian lecsó and Serbo-Croat sataraš.

Turkish şakşuka, although it shares the same etymology as shakshouka (from a North African Arabic dialect meaning "mixed"), is a completely different dish which does not include eggs. Menemen also differs from çılbır, as the latter is a traditional Turkish dish made of poached eggs and yoghurt, instead of tomatoes

== History ==
According to several accounts, menemen developed in Menemen after Cretan Muslims resettled there during the 1923 population exchange between Greece and Turkey. These settlers are said to have initially prepared simple dishes of wild greens with eggs and olive oil, later adapting a local tomato-based stew by substituting eggs for meat during a period of economic hardship, with green peppers added afterward to give the dish its present form. The dish reportedly spread beyond the region after the 1930s.

== Preparation ==
The tomatoes used for menemen are typically finely diced, although it has variations of grated and in form of canned pastes. Grated and diced tomatoes can also be mixed together to have various textures. If onions are of preference, they may be added to the pan with the green chili peppers while they are sautéed with heated butter or oil. Aleppo pepper may be added. The addition of onions is often debated and it is commonly used when menemen is not eaten in breakfast but as the main dish. Some Turkish cooks like Saniye Anne insist that a proper menemen cannot be made without onions. In 2018, Turkish food critic Vedat Milor launched a Twitter poll to resolve the discussion about onion within menemen. The poll became widely popular, with 437,657 people voting. The vote proved inconclusive, as the onion faction only had a narrow victory, with 50.6% of the vote.

Sucuk, a dried salami-like sausage, can be added to the pan after the peppers have softened. This adds some flavor to the oil; the sucuk can be removed from the pan before the tomatoes are added to avoid overcooking, although not necessary. The tomatoes become very soft and the mix not be too watery when the eggs are added. The eggs may be beaten together with salt, pepper and any desired fresh herbs or added directly to the pan. If pastırma is being used, it is added to the pan with the eggs. Kaşar cheese or white cheese may optionally be added on top of the eggs just before they finish cooking, along with a garnish of fresh herbs or scallions. It is usually served in the pan in which it is cooked, a double-handled cooking pan known as sahan, together with fresh bread.

Some variations may include mushrooms or minced lamb. Different spices may be added according to taste including cumin, paprika, mint, and thyme.

== See also ==
- Huevos rancheros
- Mish-mash
- Piperade
- Scrambled eggs
- Shakshouka
- Strapatsada
- List of egg dishes
