= Hungarian sausages =

Sausages of Hungarian cuisine

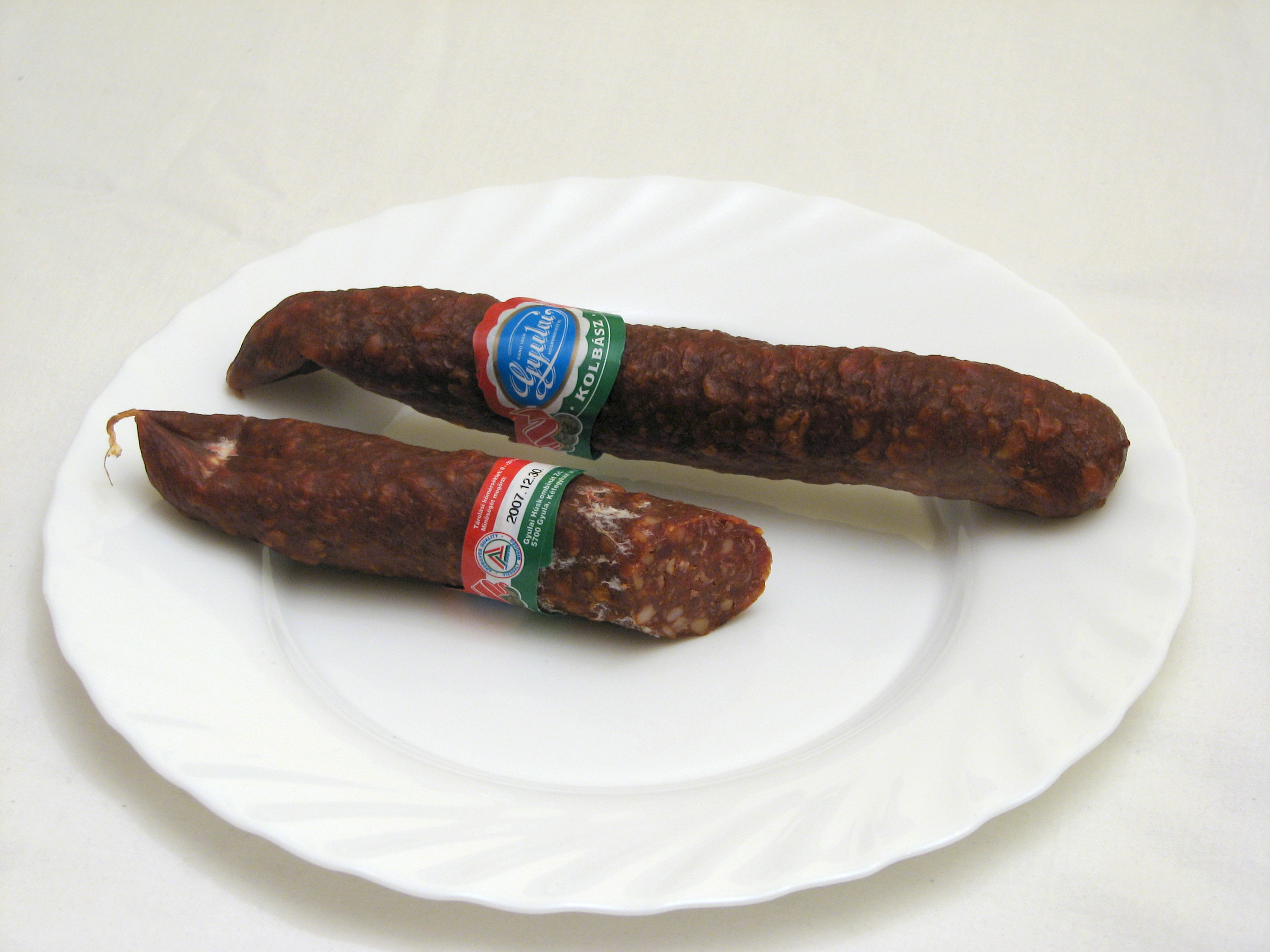
Hungarian Gyulai Kolbász

Hungarian sausages are sausages found in the cuisine of Hungary. Hungary produces a vast number of sausage types. They may be boiled, fresh or dried, and smoked, with different spices and flavors, hot or mild. Hungarian cuisine uses different types of sausages in many ways such as in dishes, for example, in stews like paprikás krumpli or in soups such as bean goulash.

These sausages may be eaten like a cold cut or used in a main course. Hungarian cuisine uses these different types of sausages in many ways such as in stews, soups, potato stews like "paprikás krumpli" (paprika-based stew with spicy sausage and potatoes), bean soups like Jókai bableves, some goulash soup variations, pastry dishes, or even in salads.

The smoked sausages may contain bacon, ground pork, beef, horse, boar or lamb, paprika, salt, garlic, black pepper, allspice, white pepper, caraway, nutmeg, zest, marjoram, cayenne pepper, sugar, white wine or cognac. Sausages may have additional ingredients like liver, mushroom, bread, rice, lemon juice, eggs, cream or milk.

The meat is coarsely ground and salted. If garlic is added, it is mashed in water to produce a slurry and added to the meat along with spices. The sausage is then stuffed into natural casings in 1-foot links - usually using the small intestine of the pig. This traditionally took place outside on the fall day when a pig was slaughtered. The sausage is then hung overnight to allow the flavors to meld and some of the grease to drip out. It is now ready to be used fresh and unsmoked. The unsmoked sausages are typically roasted with sauerkraut or red or green cabbage, and served with mashed potatoes.

The dry sausages are cold smoked and hung to cure before consumption.

== Cooked sausages ==
=== Kolbász ===
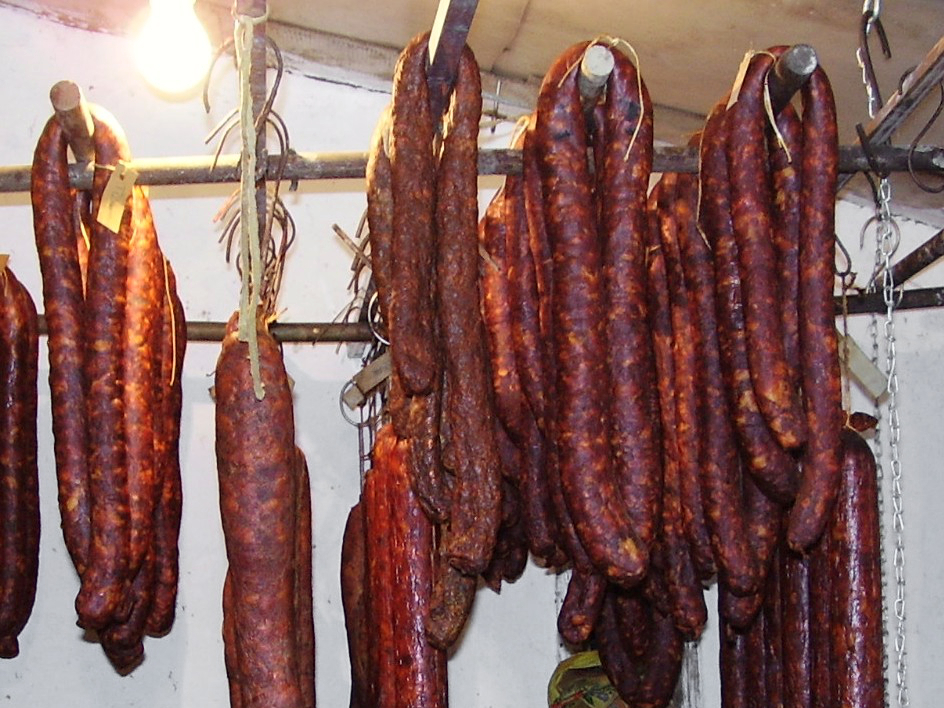
Csabai kolbász

Kolbász is a traditional Hungarian smoked sausage seasoned with paprika, garlic, and other spices. The best known and most popular versions are:

- Gyulai sausage is named after the Hungarian town of Gyula, and has PGI protection. It is slow cooked while being beech wood smoked. It is made from pork, 'szalonna' (Hungarian bacon fat), garlic, pepper, caraway, and a Hungarian red paprika. At the World Exhibition of Food in Brussels 1935, the Gyulai kolbász was awarded a gold diploma. The sausage may be cut into thin slices and eaten alone or with bread. They are also added to many Hungarian dishes including lecsó and potato/egg casserole (rakott krumpli).
- Csabai sausage is made in the town Békéscsaba, and also has Protected Geographical Status (PGI) protection. is very similar to the Gyulai type. It is made in mild and hot versions, both characterized by beech wood smoking and a strong paprika flavor. It is spicier and heavier on paprika.
- Csemege kolbász is an mildly spiced cooked smoked sausage
- Cserkész kolbász is a cooked smoked sausage made from beef and pork.
- Debreceni kolbász is usually unsmoked or lightly smoked. It contains pork, beef, salt, garlic, pepper, and a generous amount of paprika that produces a pungent orange red color.
- Lecsókolbász, a spicy cooked smoked sausage made specifically for serving as part of the dish lecsó, a vegetable stew with peppers and tomatoes.

=== Hurka ===
Hurka (Hungarian: [ˈhurkɒ]) are boiled sausages that come in two main types "májas" (liver sausage), and "véres" (blood sausage). The main ingredient is liver and rice, or blood and rice. Spices include pepper, salt, and marjoram. Hurka is usually fried before eating.

=== Other cooked sausages ===
- Virsli is a long, thin hot dog like sausage made from beef and pork. It is usually eaten boiled and served with bread and mustard.
- Párizsi (also called parizer or Paris sausage) is a soft, pale, finely ground sausage similar to Bologna. It is widely used as a cold cut.

== Uncooked sausages ==
=== Szalámi ===
Hungary's most famous salami is téliszalámi (winter salami). It is traditionally made from Mangalitsa pork and seasoned with white pepper and allspice. It is cold smoked and slow cured in winter conditions to develop its characteristic flavor.

The Mangalica pig is a native Hungarian breed known for its high fat meat, which is used to make premium salami and other traditional sausages. Its meat is often seasoned with paprika, salt, and garlic.

== See also ==
- List of dried foods
- List of smoked foods
