= Huevos motuleños =

Yucatán breakfast dish

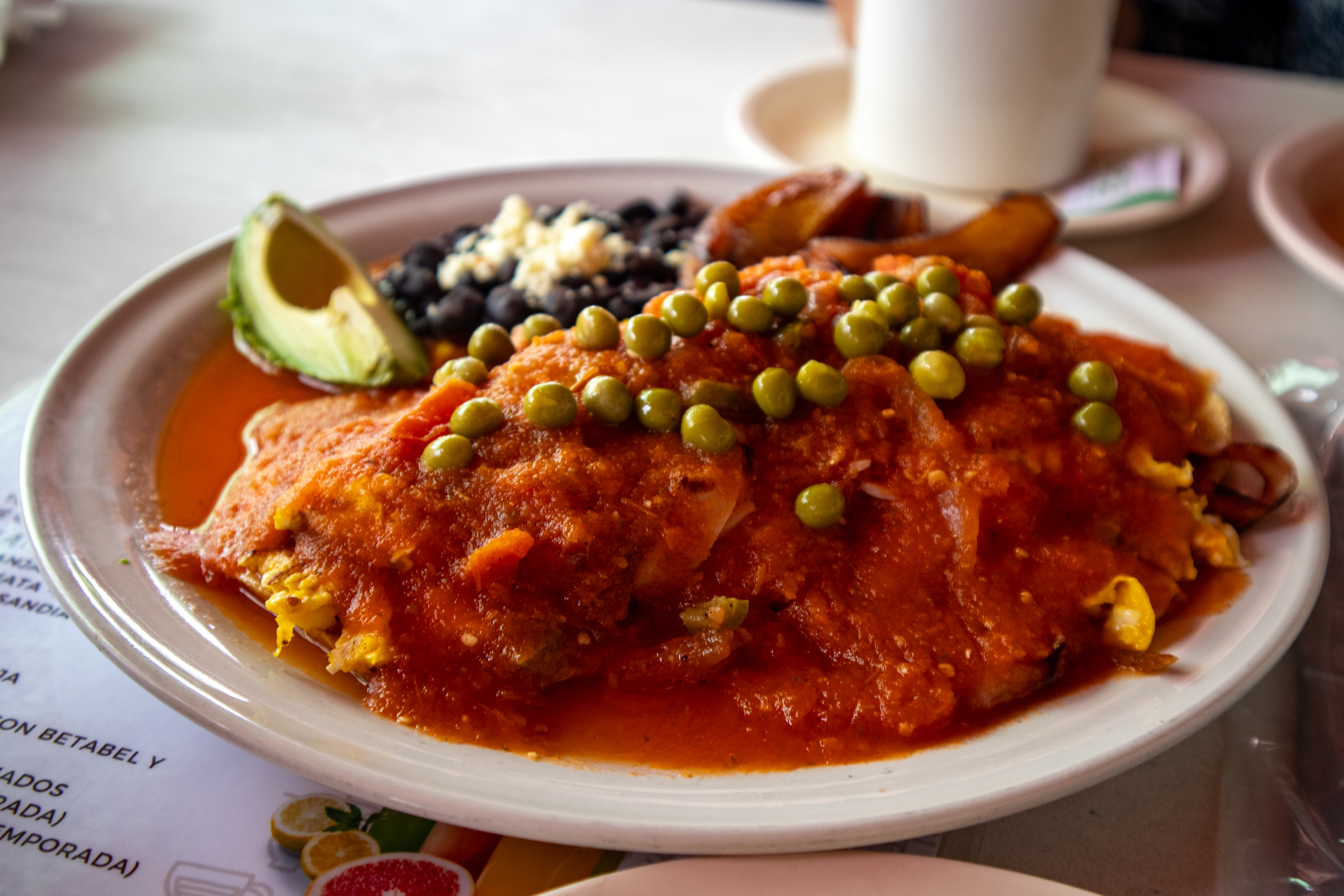
- Course: Breakfast
- Place of origin: Mexico
- Region or state: Motul, Yucatán
- Main ingredients: Tortillas, eggs, black beans, cheese

Huevos motuleños (pronounced [ˈweβos motuˈleɲos]) is a breakfast food which originated in the town of Motul (Yucatán). The dish is made with eggs on tortillas with black beans and cheese, often with other ingredients such as ham, peas, plantains, and hot sauce. In addition to being served in many restaurants in Yucatán, Quintana Roo and Oaxaca, this breakfast dish is also common in Cuba and Costa Rica.

== See also ==
- Huevos rancheros
- List of egg dishes
- List of Mexican dishes
