= Piperade =

Basque vegetable dish

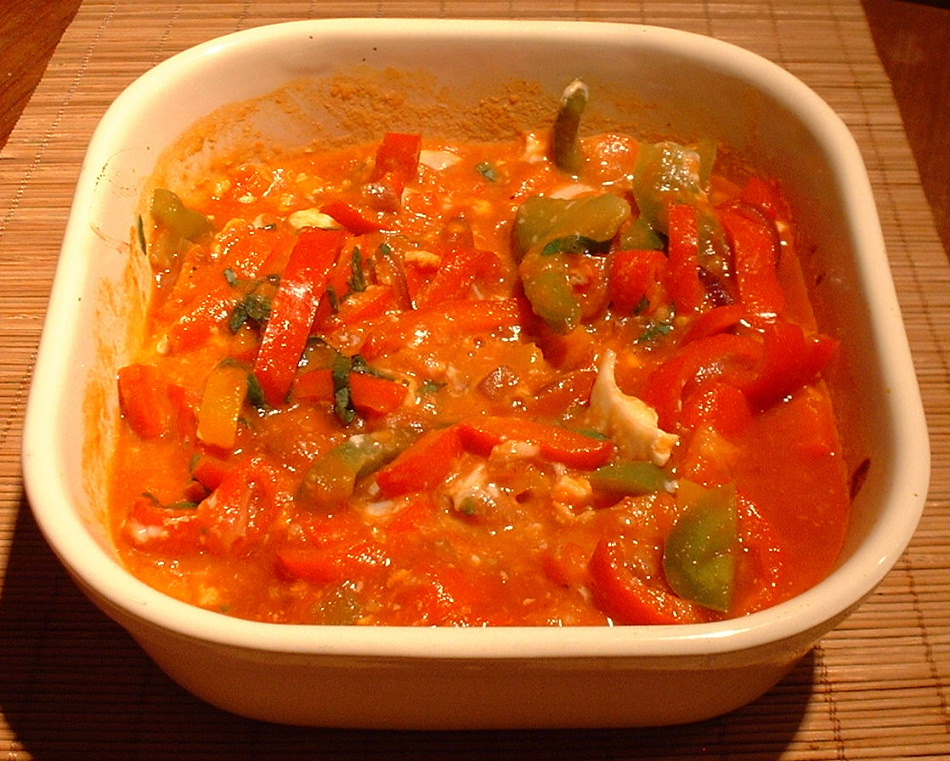
- Course: Entrée or side dish
- Place of origin: Gascony (France)
- Region or state: Basque Country, Gascony
- Main ingredients: Onions, green peppers, tomatoes, red Espelette pepper

Piperade (Gascon and French) or piperrada (Basque and Spanish), from piper (pepper in Gascon and in Basque), is a Gascon and Basque dish prepared with onion, green peppers, and tomatoes sautéd and flavoured with red Espelette pepper. The colours coincidentally reflect the colours of the Basque flag (red, green, and white). It may be served as a main course or as a side dish. Typical additions include egg, garlic, or meats such as ham.

== See also ==
- Lecsó
- Matbucha
- Peperonata
- Pico de gallo
- Qalayet bandora
- Salsa
- Sataraš
