= Qalayet bandora =

Levantine tomato, onion, and hot pepper dish

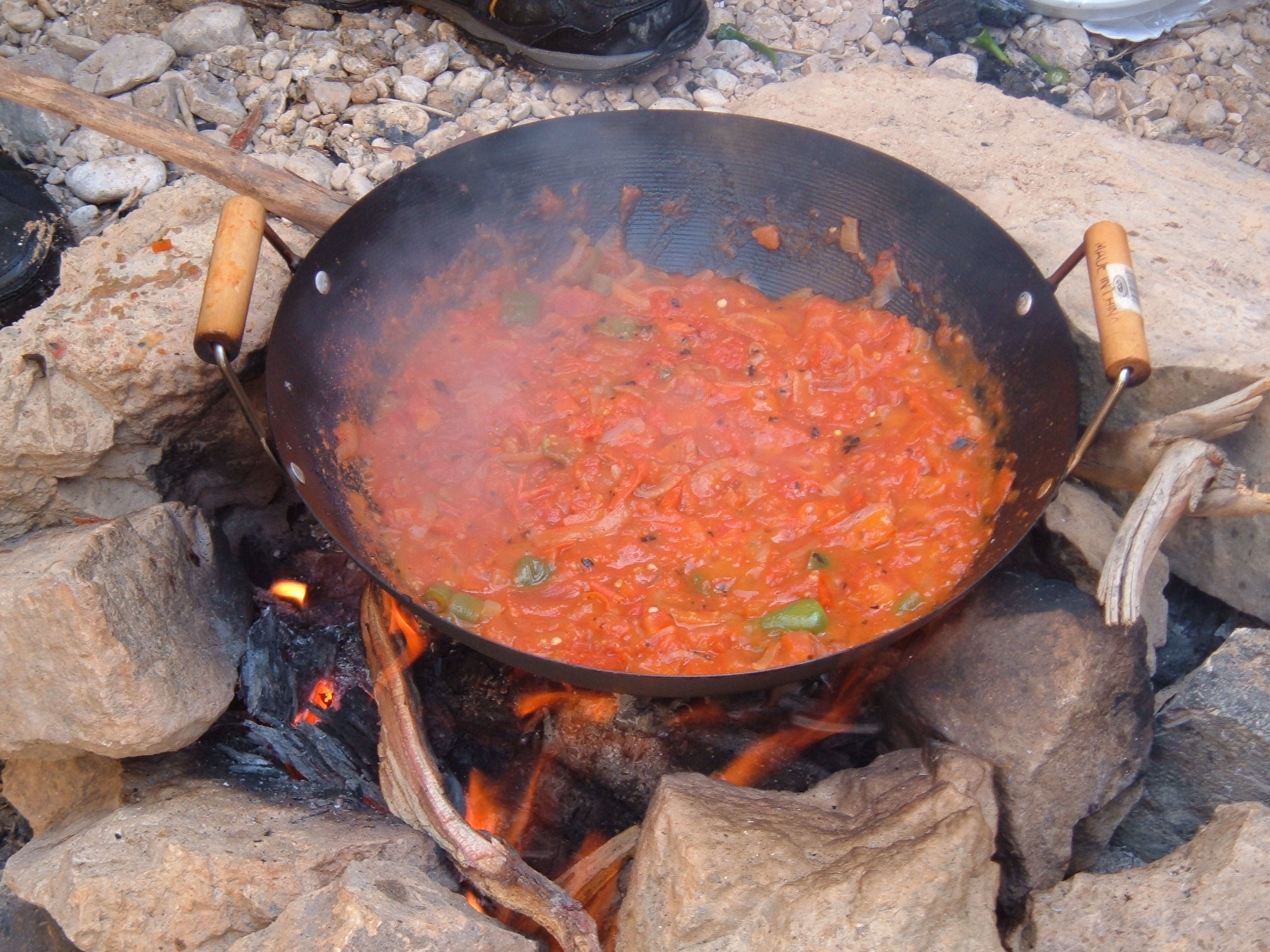
- Qalayet bandora cooked over a campfire in Wadi Mukheiris, near the Jordanian coast of the Dead Sea.
- Type: Main dish Meze; Side
- Course: Breakfast; Lunch; Dinner
- Place of origin: Lebanon, Palestine, Syria, Jordan
- Region or state: Levant
- Associated cuisine: Levantine
- Serving temperature: Hot
- Main ingredients: Tomatoes; Onions and/or garlic Olive oil
- Ingredients generally used: Salt, hot peppers
- Variations: Qalayet bandora bi lahma Shakshuka
- Food energy (per serving): 165 kcal (690 kJ)
Nutritional value
(per serving)
- Protein: 10 g
- Fat: 12 g
- Carbohydrate: 4 g

Qalayet bandora (Arabic: قلّاية بندورة أو مسقّعة البندورة, lit. 'pan of tomatoes') is a simple Levantine dish of tomatoes, onions, hot peppers (usually serranos or jalapenos), olive oil, and salt. It is popular across the Levant, but especially in Jordan and Palestine on account of its easy preparation and healthy ingredients.

To make the dish, the olive oil is heated in a large frying pan. The onions and peppers are diced and the tomatoes are cubed and optionally peeled. The onions are then added and cooked until translucent, at which point the rest of the ingredients are added and the mixture is sautéed until it is thick but not dry. Qalayet bandora is usually eaten with warm pita bread, which is used to scoop it up, though qalayet bandora can also be served over rice and eaten with utensils. When served in a restaurant or at a formal event, it is often garnished with toasted pine nuts.

Many varieties of the dish exist, including with meat (ground beef or beef or lamb stew meat), fried eggs, or garlic.

== History ==
The origin of the dish is disputed, one of the earliest documented references to frying tomatoes in olive oil dates to 1544; 16th century Italian physician Pietro Andrea Mattioli wrote that tomatoes were fried in Italy in a manner similar to mushrooms, cooked in olive oil and seasoned with salt.

== Culture ==
Palestinians and Jordanians traditionally prepare qalayet bandora during the olive harvest season.

Because it is an easy one-pot meal, qalayet bandora is often eaten while camping or backpacking.

In 2019, king Abdullah II of Jordan stated in a widely-reported interview that qalayet bandora was his favorite dish. He cited the preference in response to a question about his public image, describing it as an indication that he was an ordinary person.

== See also ==
- Huevos rancheros
- Lecsó, a similar Hungarian dish
- Matbukha, the Maghrebi version
- Pisto (from Spain)
- Shakshuka, like qalayet bandora but with eggs and spices added.
