= Saniye Anne Yemekleri =

YouTube channel

Saniye Anne Yemekleri ("Mother Saniye Foods") is the YouTube channel of Saniye Karataş, which has over 570,000 subscribers. The videos for her channel are filmed by her son Süleyman Karataş. Karataş, who lives in İzmir, Turkey, turned 77 in 2018. She insists that a proper menemen is made with onions. (The inclusion of onions in the traditional breakfast dish is an often debated topic in Turkey.)

Karataş was born to a farming family in the village of Mersindere, in Salihli, Manisa. She started the YouTube channel to help pay for her son's prosthetic leg after his leg was amputated due to a medical condition. Her son first began filming her with a cell phone camera at a time when the family was struggling to pay medical bills. Karataş had recently had bypass surgery, and her son's surgery came soon after. Süleyman uploaded the film to YouTube and it received thousands of hits—Saniye's fans began to send her messages calling her "Saniye Anne" (anne means mother in Turkish) and sending in requests for recipes. She was invited to Google's Women and Technology Symposium at the Çırağan Palace.
