= Shakshouka =

Maghrebi dish of eggs poached in a sauce

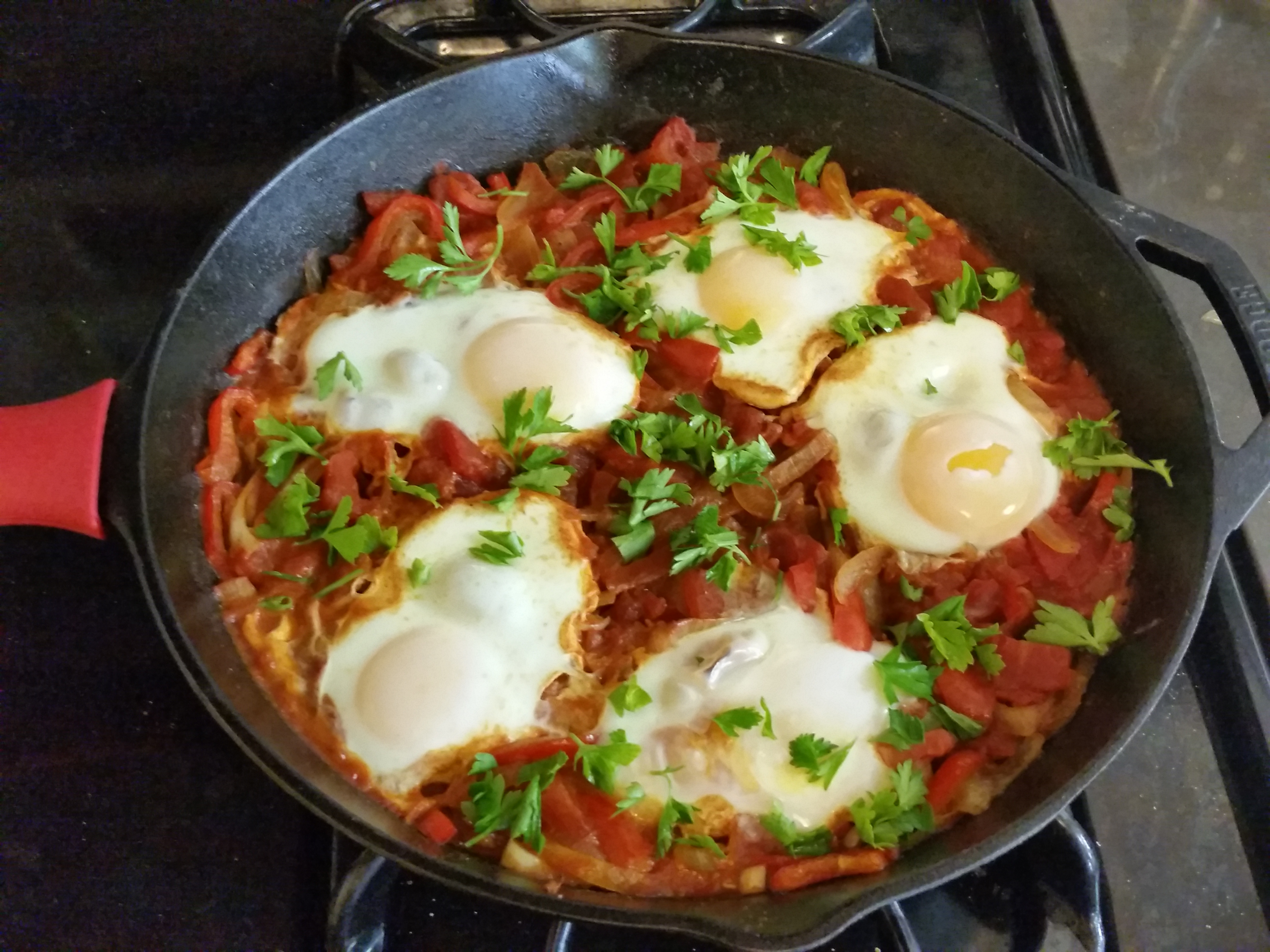
- Shakshouka in a cast iron pan
- Alternative names: Shakshuka, chakchouka
- Type: Main dish
- Place of origin: Ottoman North Africa
- Main ingredients: Tomatoes, olive oil, peppers, onion, garlic, spices

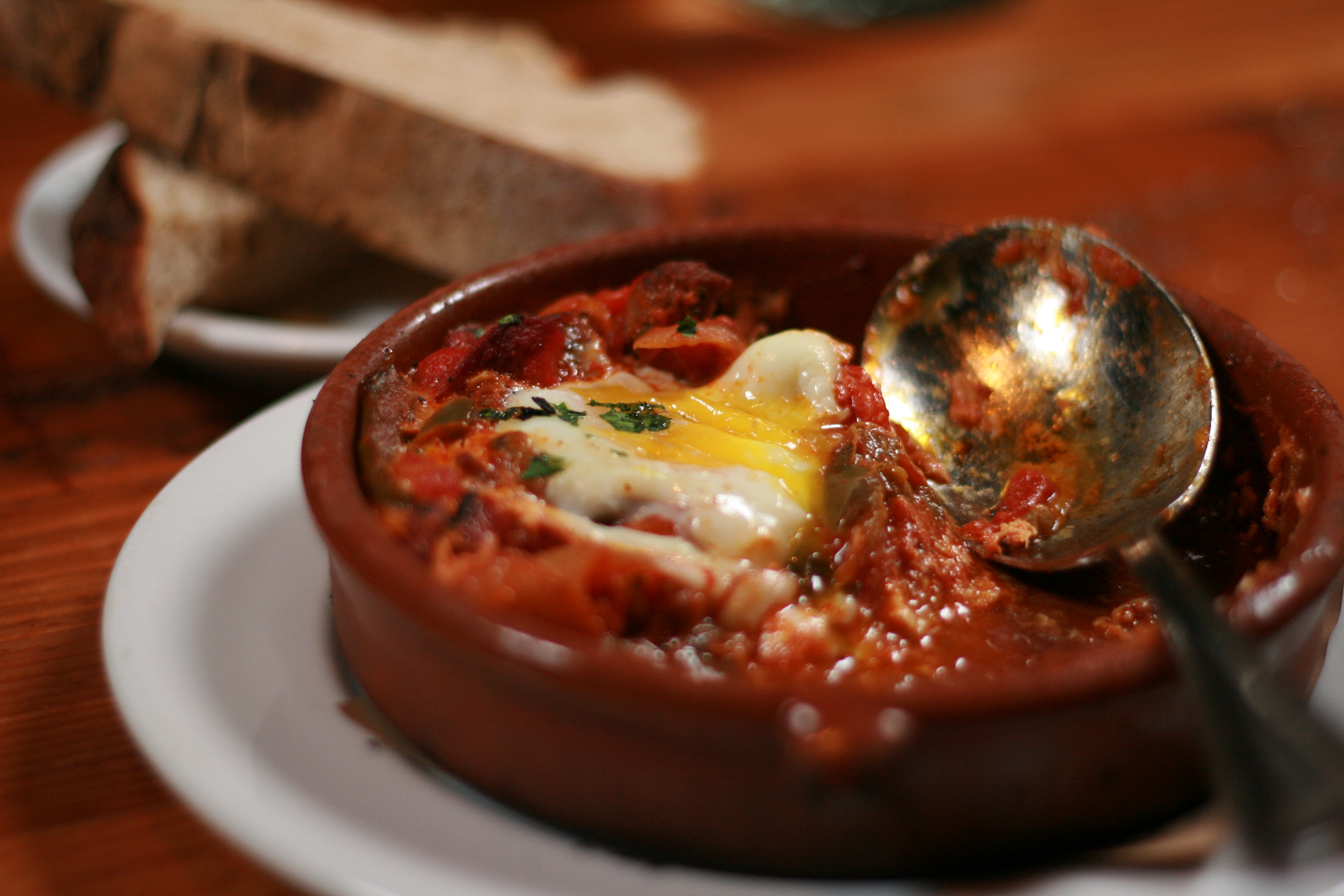
Individual portion of shakshouka

Shakshouka (Note: Arabic: شكشوكة, romanized: šakšūkah) (Note: also spelled shakshuka or chakchouka) is a Maghrebi dish of eggs poached in a sauce of tomatoes, olive oil, peppers, onion, and garlic, commonly spiced with cumin, paprika, and cayenne pepper. Shakshouka is a popular dish throughout North Africa and the Middle East.

== Etymology ==
Shakshuka is a word for "mixture" in Algerian Arabic, and "mixed" in Tunisian Arabic. The Oxford English Dictionary describes the English version of the word as being borrowed from more than one origin: an onomatopoeic Maghribi Arabic word, related to the verb shakshaka meaning "to bubble, to sizzle, to be mixed up, to be beaten together", and the French word Chakchouka, which was borrowed into English in the nineteenth century, and which itself had been borrowed into French from Algerian Arabic.

== History ==
Gil Marks, while noting some similarities with the Ottoman dish menemen, suggests that shakshouka evolved from şakşuka which spread to the Maghreb through the influence of the Ottoman Empire. Anthony Buccini noted similarities between a wider range of vegetable stews. He and Noam Sienna conclude that both shakshouka and menemen, among other dishes like piperade and ratatouille, are members of a wider family of vegetable stews of common ancestry appearing throughout the western Mediterranean.

The migration of Maghrebi Jews in the 1950s brought the dish to Israel, where it was subsequently widely adopted. The dish was not previously associated with Palestinian or Levantine cuisine. Shakshouka began appearing in Israeli restaurants in the 1990s.

== Variations ==
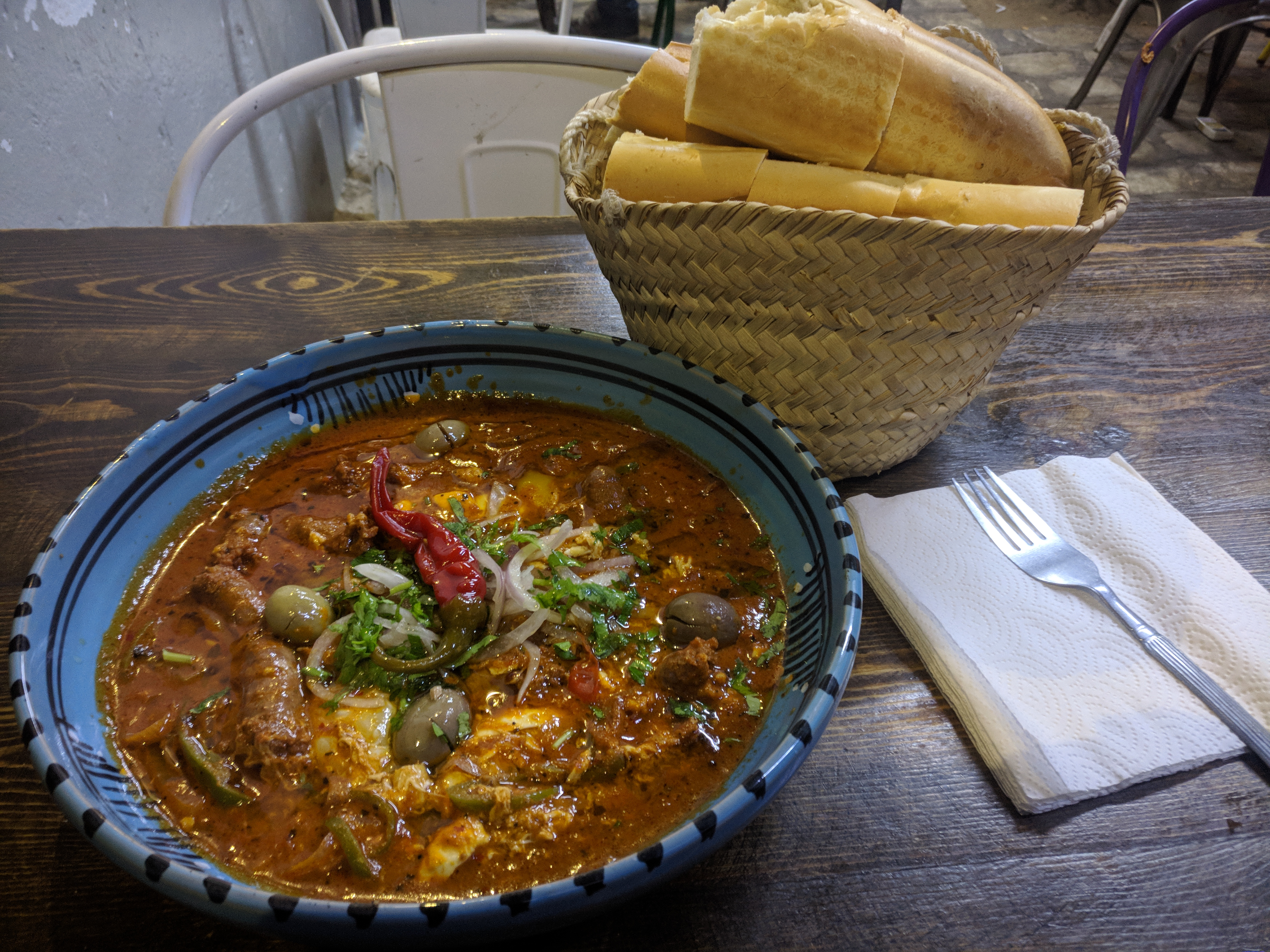
Merguez shakshuka

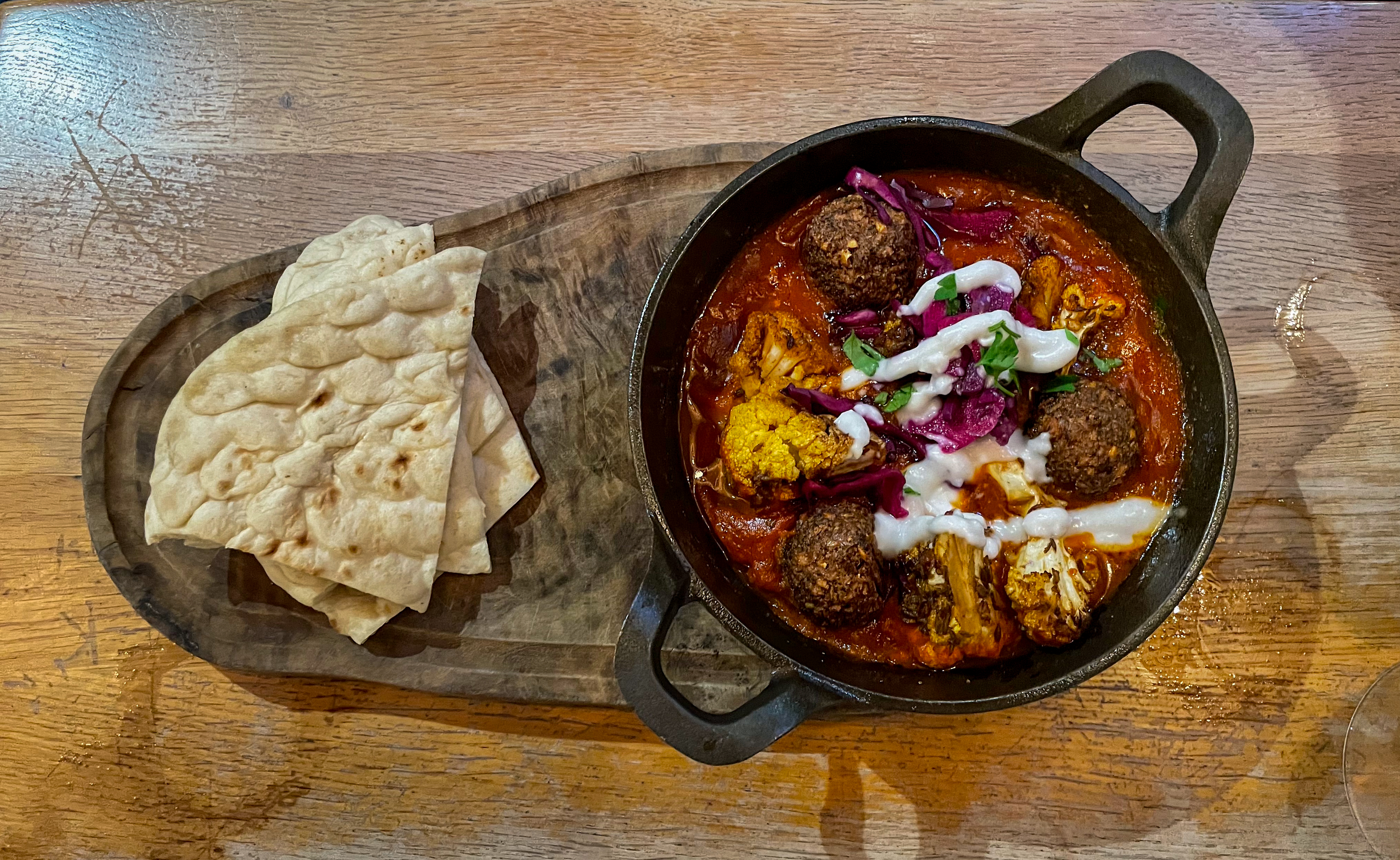
Vegan shakshouka, with falafel in place of eggs

Many variations of the basic sauce are possible, varying in spice and sweetness. Some cooks add preserved lemon, salty sheep milk cheeses, olives, harissa or a spicy sausage such as chorizo or merguez. Shakshouka is made with eggs, which are commonly poached but can also be scrambled, like in the Turkish menemen.

In Algeria, shakshouka is commonly eaten as a side dish, and there are countless variations of it, each with their own unique blend of ingredients. One such variation is hmiss, which is often served alongside traditional kesra bread. Hmiss typically includes grilled peppers, tomatoes, and garlic. In Tunisia, a similar dish called slata meshouia is enjoyed, but it differs from hmiss with the addition of onions, cumin and tuna.

In Syria, jaz maz is a similar eggs-and-tomatoes dish, it is sometimes referred to as shakshouka.

In Morocco, there is a dish referred to as bīḍ w-maṭiša (بيض ومطيشة "egg and tomato").

In Egypt, the dish features the typical poached eggs in a spiced tomato-based sauce but with some variations in ingredients. The base consists of sautéed onions, garlic, and chopped bell peppers cooked until softened. Chopped tomatoes or tomato paste is then added, along with spices such as cumin, paprika, and chili powder. Once the sauce thickens, eggs are cracked directly into the mixture and poached until the whites are set but the yolks remain runny. It is garnished with fresh herbs like parsley and cilantro, sometimes also a sprinkle of domiati cheese. The dish is commonly eaten with warm eish baladi, and is a popular choice for breakfast in the country.

Some variations of shakshouka can be made with lamb mince, toasted whole spices, yogurt and fresh herbs. Spices can include ground coriander, caraway, paprika, cumin and cayenne pepper. Tunisian cooks may add potatoes, broad beans, artichoke hearts or courgettes to the dish. The North African dish matbukha can be used as a base for shakshouka.

Because eggs are the main ingredient, it often appears on breakfast menus in English-speaking countries, but in the Arab world as well as Israel, it is also a popular evening meal, and, like hummus and falafel, is a Levantine regional favorite. On the side, pickled vegetables and North African sausage called merguez might be served, or simply bread, with mint tea.

In Jewish culture, a large batch of tomato stew may be made on Friday for the Sabbath dinner and the leftovers used on Sunday morning to make a breakfast shakshouka with eggs. In Andalusian cuisine, the dish is known as huevos a la flamenca; this version includes chorizo and serrano ham. In Italian cuisine, there is a version of this dish called uova in purgatorio (eggs in purgatory) that adds garlic, basil or parsley.

== See also ==
- List of Middle Eastern dishes
- Qalayet bandora
- Huevos rancheros
- Lecsó
- Taktouka
- Stir-fried tomato and scrambled eggs, an East Asian dish
