= Lecsó =

Hungarian dish

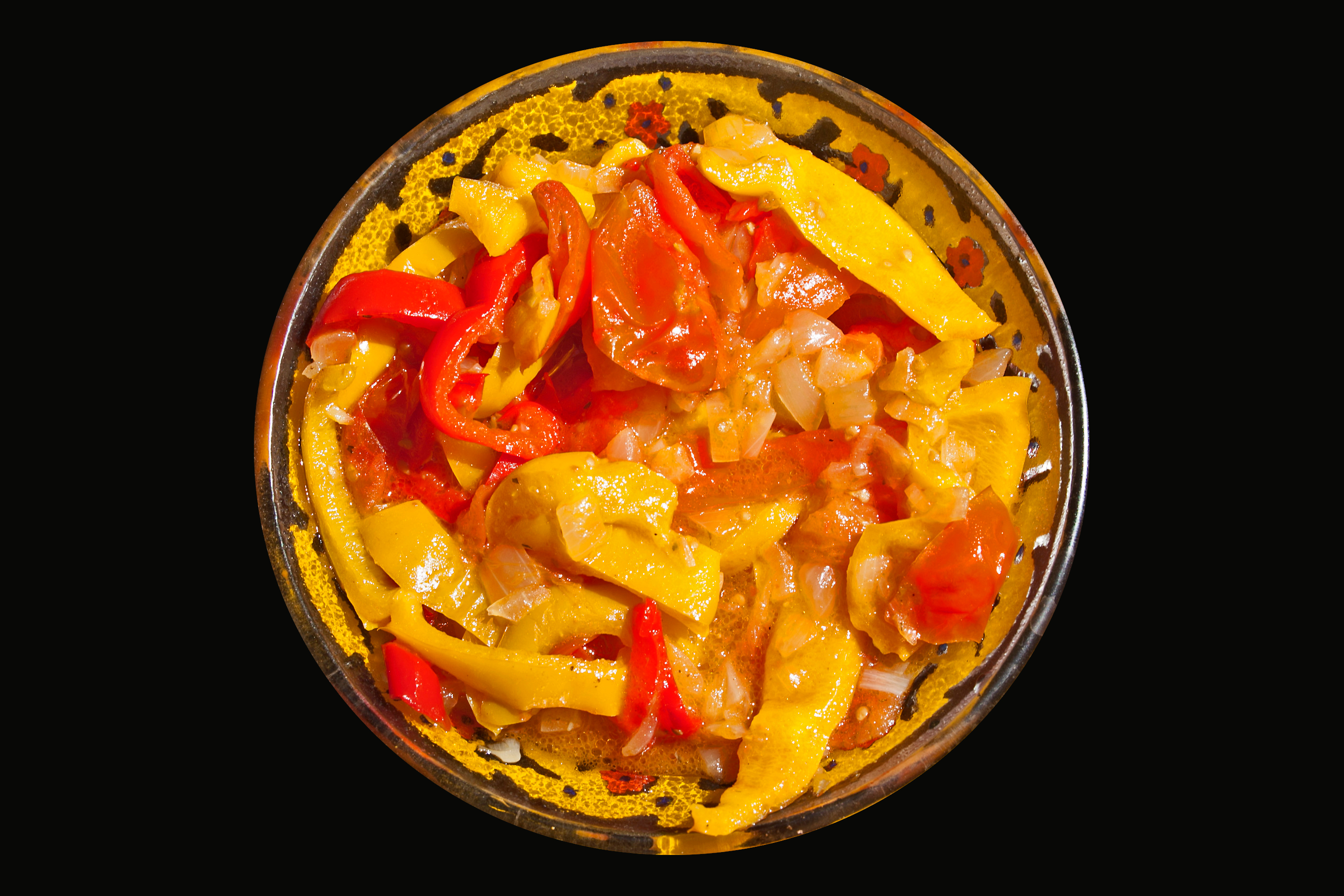
- A portion of Hungarian lecsó on a plate
- Type: Stew
- Place of origin: Hungary
- Main ingredients: Peppers, tomatoes, onions, lard, salt, ground paprika

Lecsó (/ˈlɛtʃoʊ/ LETCH-oh, Hungarian: [ˈlɛt͡ʃoː]; Czech and Slovak: lečo; Polish: leczo [ˈlɛt͡ʂɔ]; German: Letscho [ˈlɛtʃo]; Ukrainian: лечо, romanized: lecho; Russian: лечо, romanized: lyecho, IPA: [ˈlʲetɕɵ]), also anglicized as lecho, is a Hungarian thick vegetable ragout or stew which traditionally contains yellow pointed peppers, tomato, onion, salt, and ground sweet and/or hot paprika as a base recipe. The onions and peppers are usually sauteed in lard, bacon fat, or sunflower oil. Garlic can also be a traditional ingredient. It has also been adopted into Slovak, Austrian, Czech, Polish, Ukrainian, Bulgarian and Armenian cuisine.

Most Hungarian recipes recommend the mildest variant of Hungarian wax pepper, which are in season August–October which is also when field tomatoes are at their best. Other recipes suggest using both bell pepper and banana pepper as alternatives.

It is similar to the Serbo/Croatian sataraš and Turkish şakşuka.

== History ==
Once peppers and tomatoes reached the Old World, they were quickly embraced in cooking by Turks, Arabs, and Sephardic Jews, who often prepared the two vegetables in a straightforward stew. The Ottomans brought this concept to the Balkans during their rule. Lecsó in particular is believed to have emerged in Hungary in the 19th century, inspired by a similar dish prepared by ethnic Bulgarians in Hungary. Hungarians typically enhanced it by adding paprika.

== Varieties ==
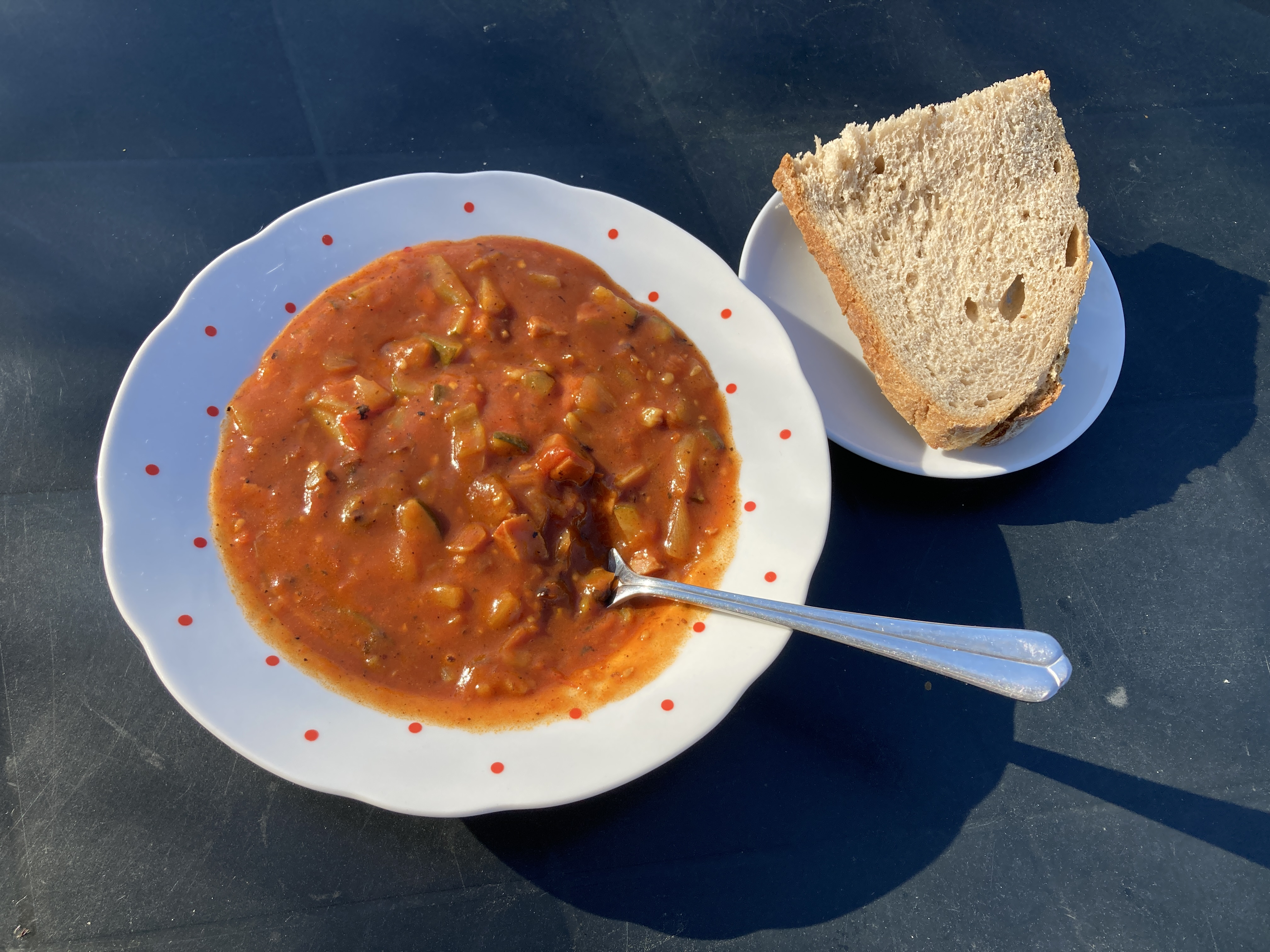
Homemade Czech "lečo".

There is a large variety of lecsó, the base of all being a mixture of tomatoes and peppers (both sweet and hot, especially using hot Bogyioszlo peppers), onions, spiced with salt, ground caraway seeds ("komeny"), red paprika powder and sometimes garlic. Some recipes may also use bay leaf, ground black pepper, or thyme, but those are not original ones. To make the perfect lecsó base, one must render the lard from the smoked bacon (if that is used instead of oil, which is also common), and fry the onion slices until the edges become slightly brownish. Next the pepper slices must be added and fried until crisp. The tomatoes come last because, if added at the beginning, they would soak the onions and the peppers.

Lecsó may be served with cooked rice or mixed with scrambled eggs. It is also commonly served as a hot dish, for example, with fried fish and sour cream or in a Hungarian style crepe (palacsinta). Most of the recipes are with sausage (called "kolbász" such as lecsókolbász, made specifically for this purpose, or Debrecener sausage) bacon, or Frankfurter. Some are decorated with slices of hard-boiled eggs or thickened with beaten eggs. If meat is added, it may be added first and fried with the onions and pepper slices.

Lecsó, like its French semi-counterpart ratatouille, often stands alone as a lunch dish, in which case it is often consumed with bread. Plain lecsó can be served as a side dish accompanying various main dishes, for example roasted chicken, pheasant, pork, beef, or Eszterhazy steak. It is widely believed in Hungary that the best lecsó is made over an open fire in a "bogrács" (a cauldron), a Hungarian-style barbecue. In Hungary, the dish is very popular and even has its own festivals.

In Germany, lecsó is referred to as Letscho and often used as the primary ingredient of a sauce that is used with many different meals. It is usually made of tomatoes, peppers, and onions among other regional additions.

In Poland, lecsó (called leczo) is usually made from red pepper, zucchini, tomatoes, onion and garlic, sausage, and spiced with powdered chilli pepper. Leczo should be served hot and spicy. It probably came to Poland from Hungary.

Romani people have their own variety called cigánylecsó.

== See also ==
- Ajvar, a Serbian and Croatian spread made of red peppers
- Sataraš, a similar dish that is popular in the Balkans
- Peperonata, a similar dish from southern Italy
- Piperade, a similar dish found in the Basque Country and Gascony
- List of stews
- Galayet bandora, a similar Jordanian dish
- Matbucha, a similar dish from the Maghreb.
