= Salsa (food) =

Condiment used in Mexican cuisine

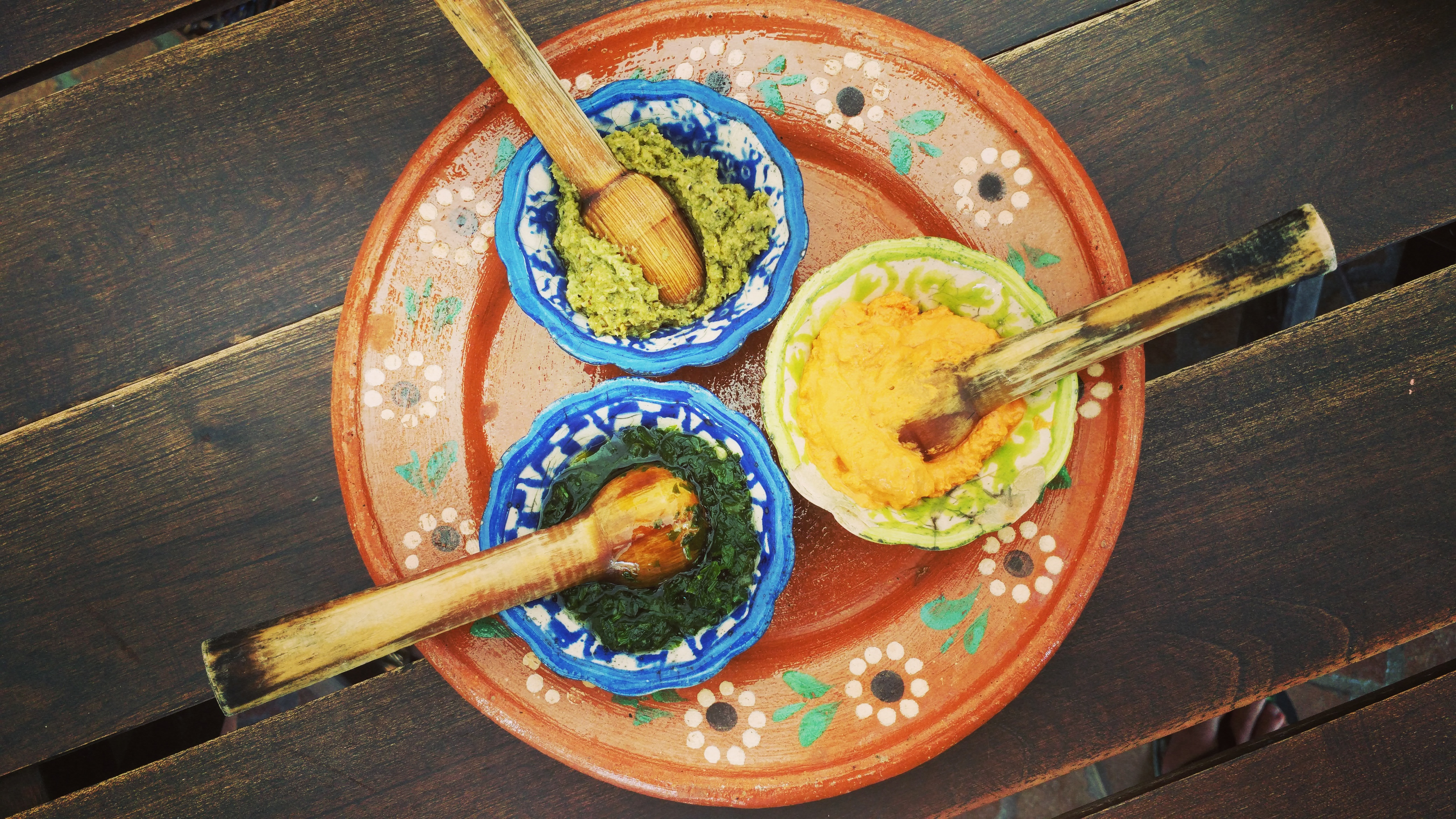
- A variety of salsas. Clockwise from top: habanero, chipotle, and chimichurri.
- Type: Condiment
- Region or state: Mexico

A salsa is any of a variety of sauces used as condiments for tacos and other Mexican and Mexican-American foods, and as dips for tortilla chips. They may be raw or cooked, and are generally served at room temperature.

Though the word salsa means any kind of sauce in Spanish, in English, it refers specifically to these Mexican table sauces, especially to the chunky tomato-and-chili-based pico de gallo, as well as to salsa verde.

Tortilla chips with salsa are a ubiquitous appetizer in Mexican-American restaurants, but not in Mexico itself.

A dish of sauce or relish is as indispensable to the Mexican table as our salt, pepper, and mustard.

— Diana Kennedy, The Cuisines of Mexico

== History ==
The use of salsa as a table dip was popularized by Mexican restaurants in the United States. In the 1980s, tomato-based Mexican-style salsas gained in popularity. In 1992, the dollar value of salsa sales in the United States exceeded those of tomato ketchup.

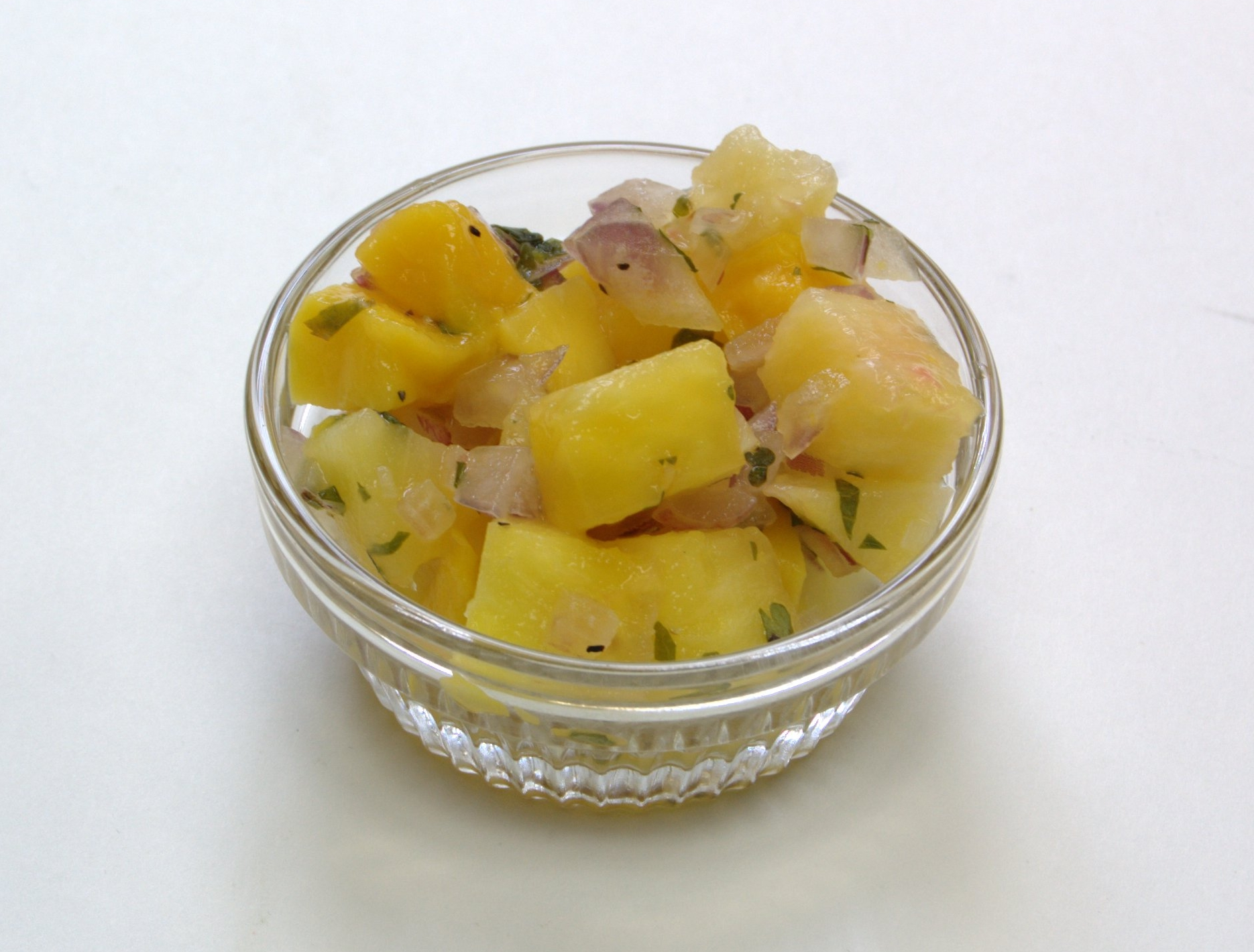
Salsa made with jalapeños, mango, pineapple, red onion and cilantro (coriander)

Tomato-based salsas later found competition from salsas made with fruit, corn, or black beans. Since the 2000s sweet salsas combining fruits with peppers like habanero, Scotch bonnet and datil have grown in popularity and are served with frozen dessert, cheesecakes, and pound cakes. In the United States, salsa is used in marinades, salad dressings, stews, and cooked sauces. In addition to accompanying various fish, poultry, and meat dishes, it is also used as a condiment for baked potatoes, pasta dishes, and pizza.

== Types ==
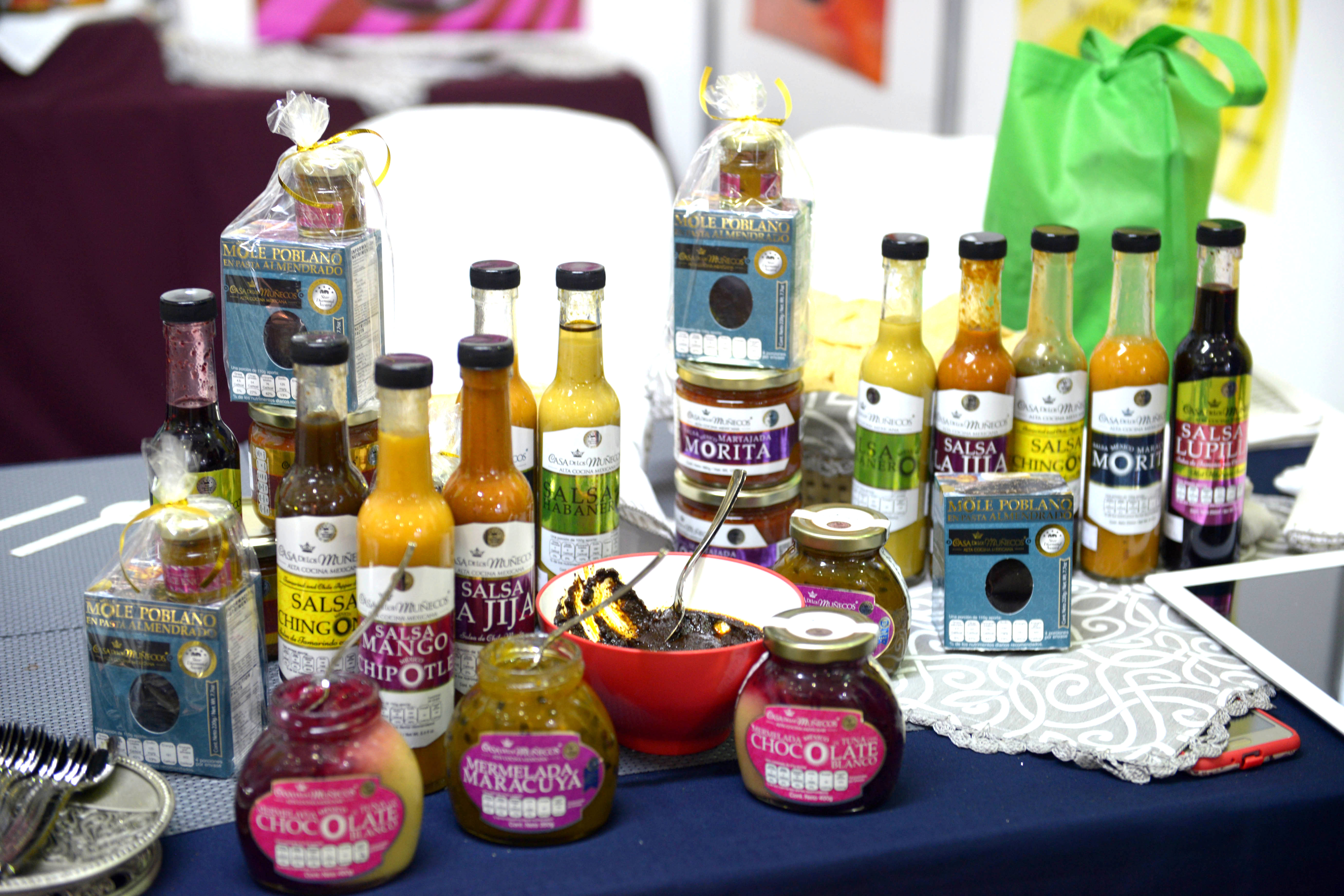
Various types of Mexican salsas, including moles

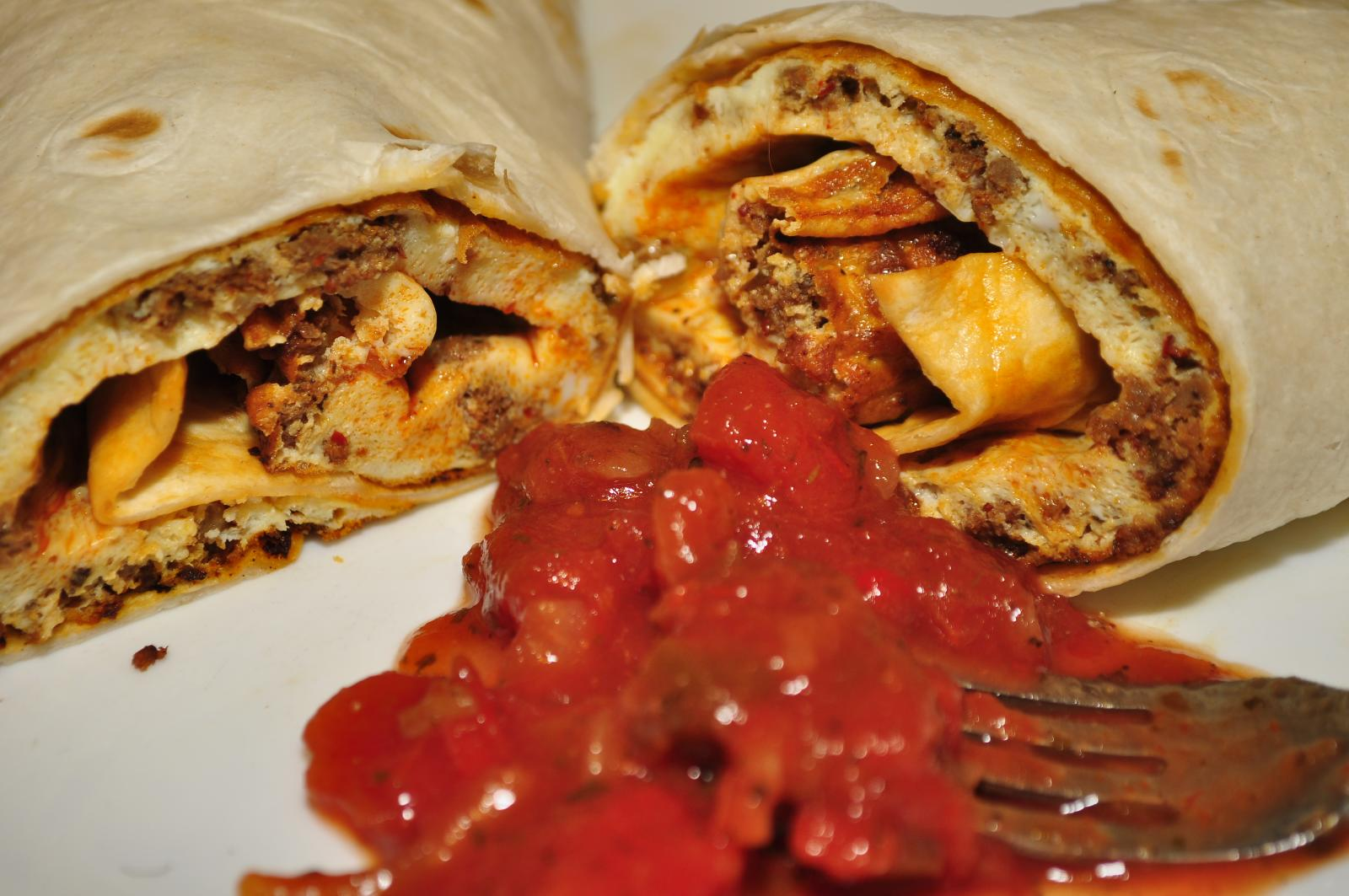
A chorizo-and-egg breakfast burrito with salsa

Salsa is a common ingredient in Mexican cuisine, served as a condiment with tacos, stirred into soups and stews, or incorporated into tamale fillings. Salsa fresca is fresh salsa made with tomatoes and hot peppers. Salsa verde is made with cooked tomatillos and is served as a dip or sauce for chilaquiles, enchiladas, and other dishes. Chiltomate is a widely used base sauce made of tomatoes and chiles. The type of pepper used for chiltomate varies by region, with fresh green chiles being more common than habanero in Chiapas. Tamales are often identified according to the type of salsa they are filled with, either salsa verde, salsa roja, salsa de rajas, or salsa de mole.

Mexican salsas were traditionally produced using the mortar and pestle–like molcajete, although blenders are now used. Mexican salsas include:

- Salsa roja, one of the two most common and well known types of salsa, "red sauce", is used as a condiment in Mexican and Southwestern (U.S.) cuisines; usually includes cooked tomatoes, chili peppers, onion, garlic, and fresh cilantro (coriander).
- Salsa cruda, "raw sauce", is an uncooked mixture of chopped tomatoes, onions, jalapeño chilies, and cilantro.

== Importance of proper storage ==
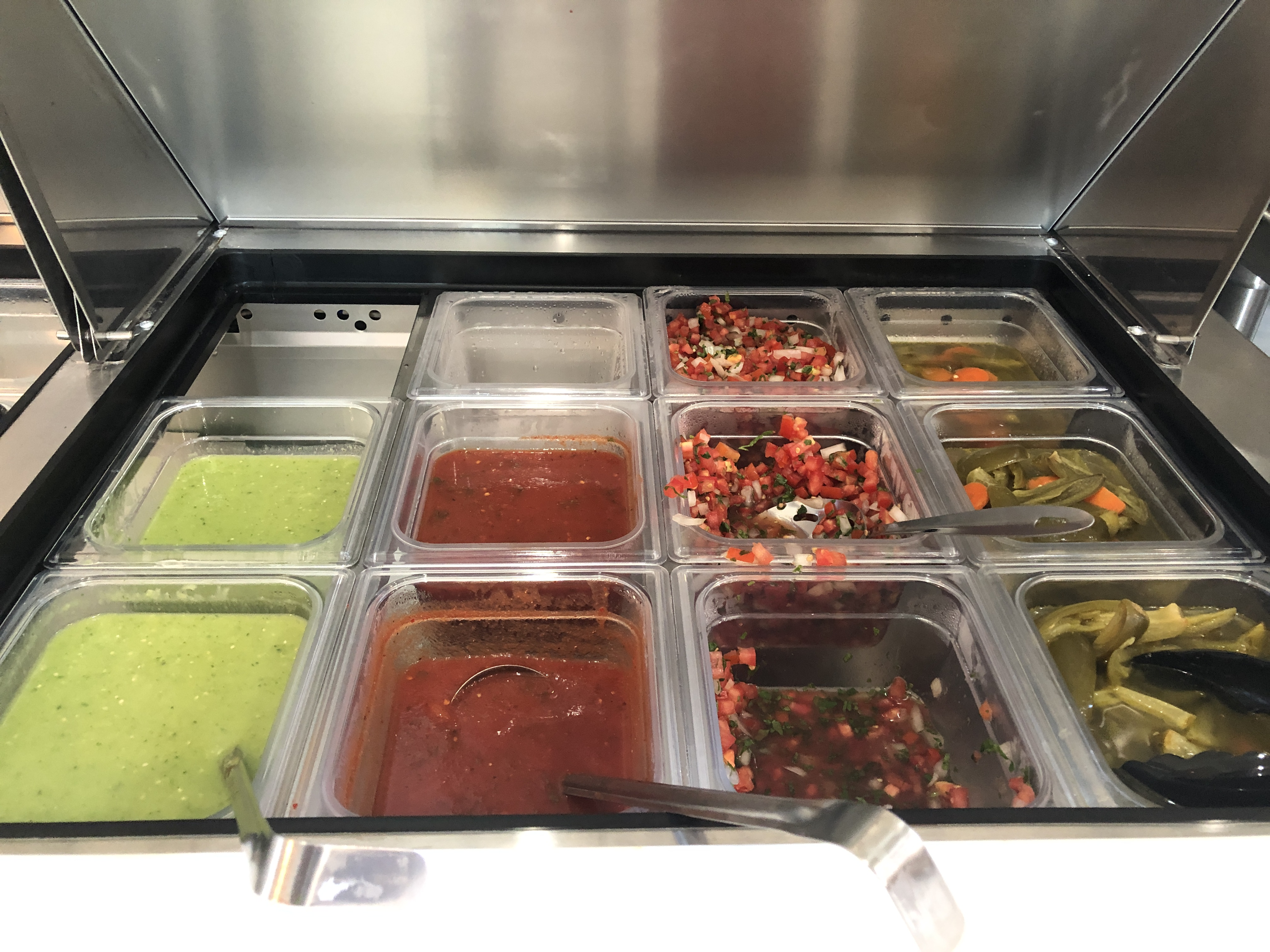
A salsa bar at a Mexican restaurant in California

The WHO says care should be taken in the preparation and storage of salsa and any other types of sauces, since many raw-served varieties can act as growth media for potentially dangerous bacteria, especially when unrefrigerated.

In 2002, a study by the University of Texas–Houston found sauces contaminated with E. coli in:

- 66% of the sauces from restaurants tested in Guadalajara, Jalisco, Mexico
- 40% of those from restaurants tested in Houston, Texas

In 2010, the CDC reported that 1 in 25 foodborne illnesses between 1998 and 2008 was traced back to restaurant sauces (carelessly prepared or stored).

A 2010 paper on salsa food hygiene described refrigeration as "the key" to safe sauces. The study also found that Salmonella would not grow in salsa with fresh lime juice, fresh (but not powdered) garlic, and a pH of 3.6.

== See also ==
- Ajika
- Dipping sauce
- Hot sauce
- Mole (sauce)
- List of condiments
- List of Mexican dishes
- Matbucha
- Qalayet bandora
- Sofrito
