= Şakşuka =

Turkish side dish of vegetables cooked in olive oil

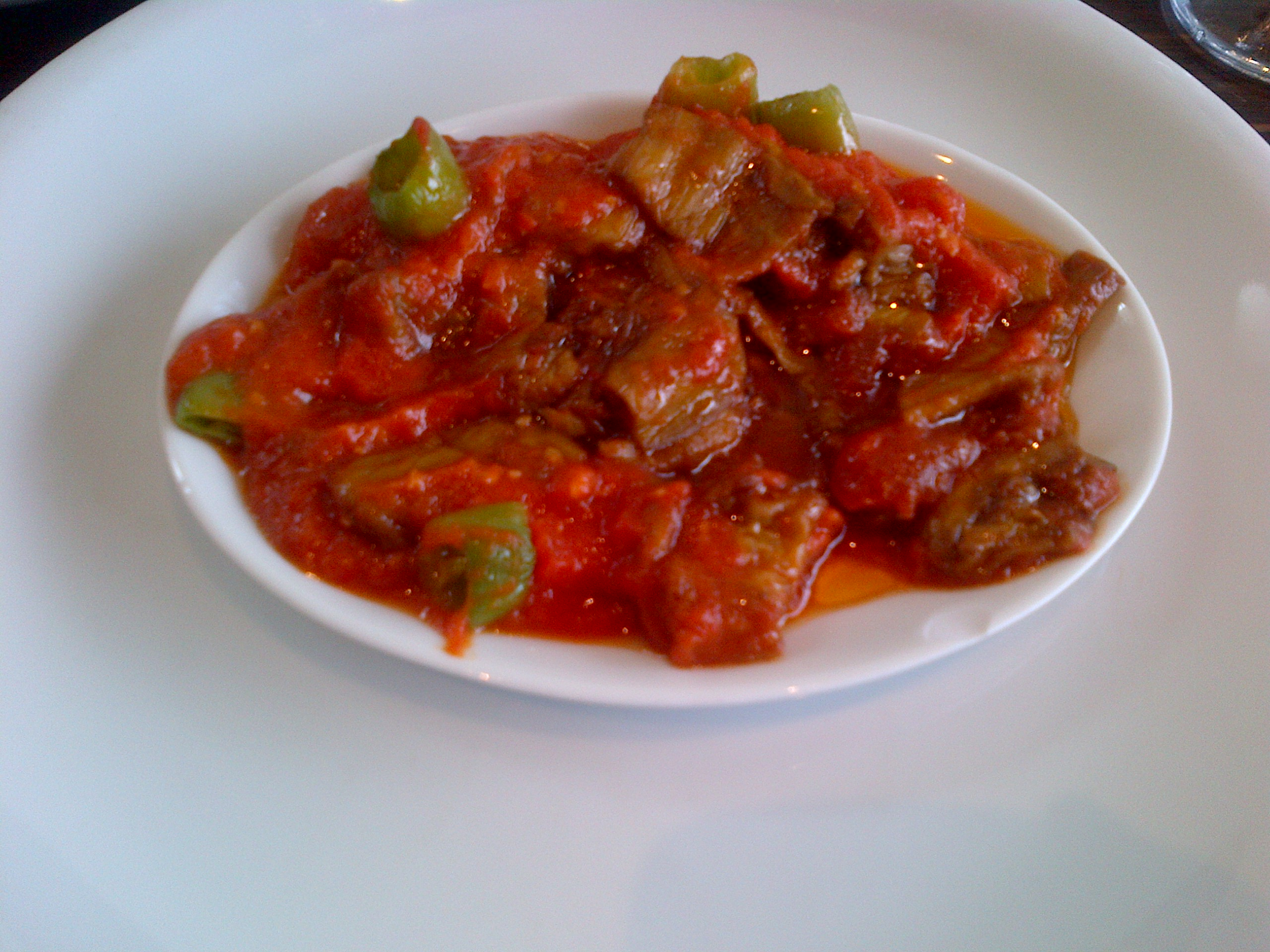
Şakşuka

Şakşuka is a Turkish side dish or meze made of vegetables cooked in olive oil. The particular vegetable may vary from region to region, but eggplant is a common choice. Balıkesir şakşuka is made with green tomatoes. The dish sometimes includes potato and peppers as well.

Although it shares the same etymology as shakshouka (from a North African Arabic dialect meaning "mixed"), Turkish şakşuka is a completely different dish which does not include eggs and is therefore vegan. The closest analogue to shakshouka in Turkish cuisine is menemen, which is essentially a shakshouka without harissa. Conversely, Turkish şakşuka is more akin to other Mediterranean dishes of roasted or fried vegetables in olive oil and tomato sauce, such as the Sicilian caponata, the Provençal ratatouille, and the Greek briam.

== See also ==
- Shakshouka
- Chakhchoukha
