= Huevos rancheros =

Mexican breakfast dish

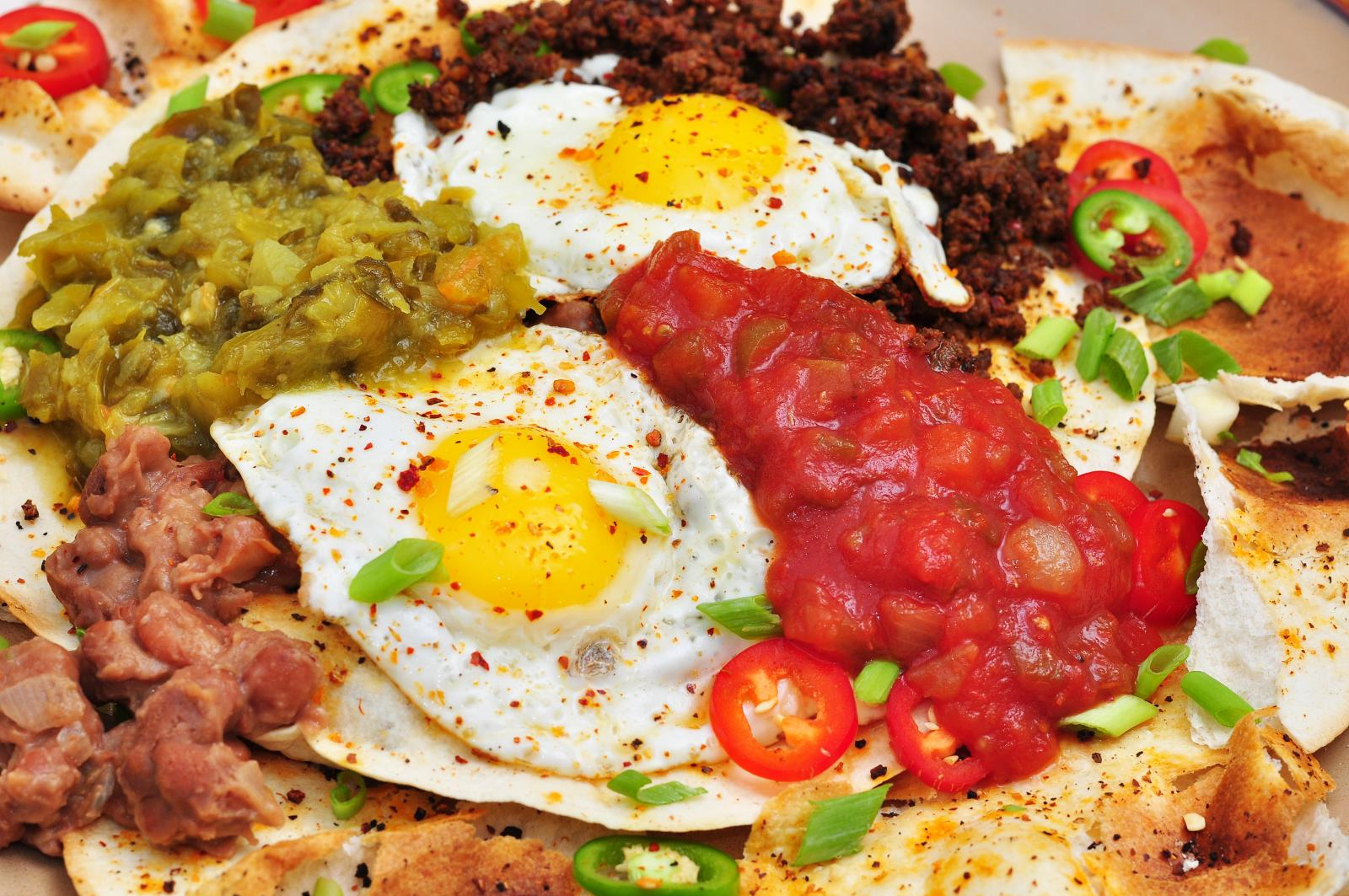
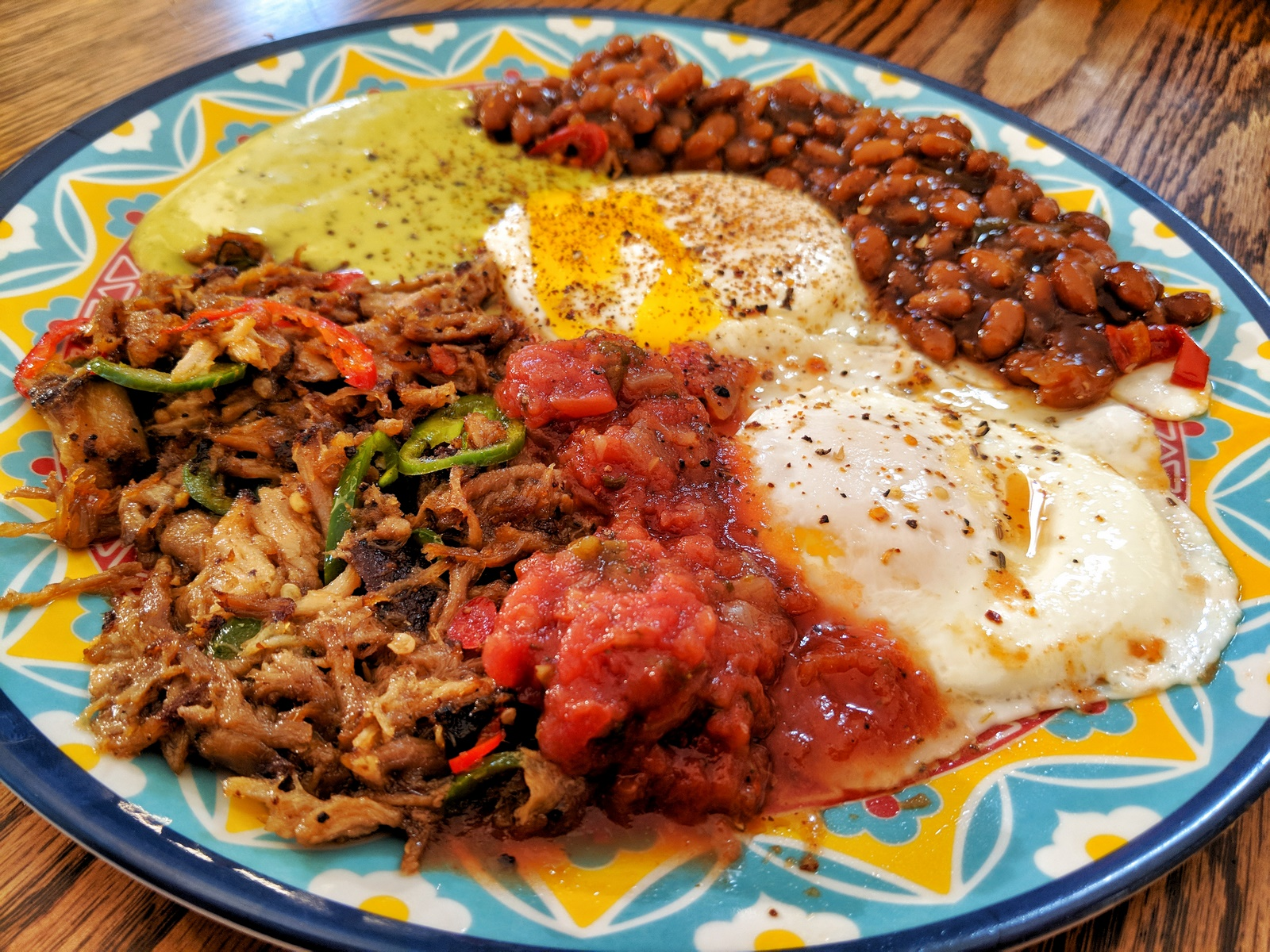
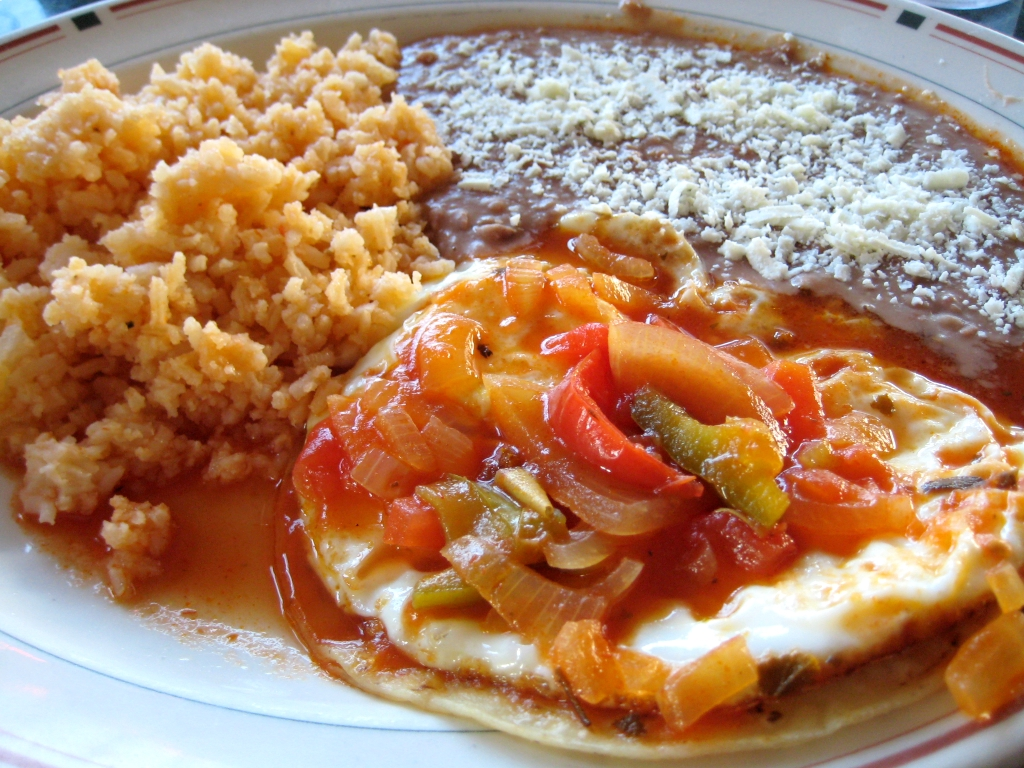
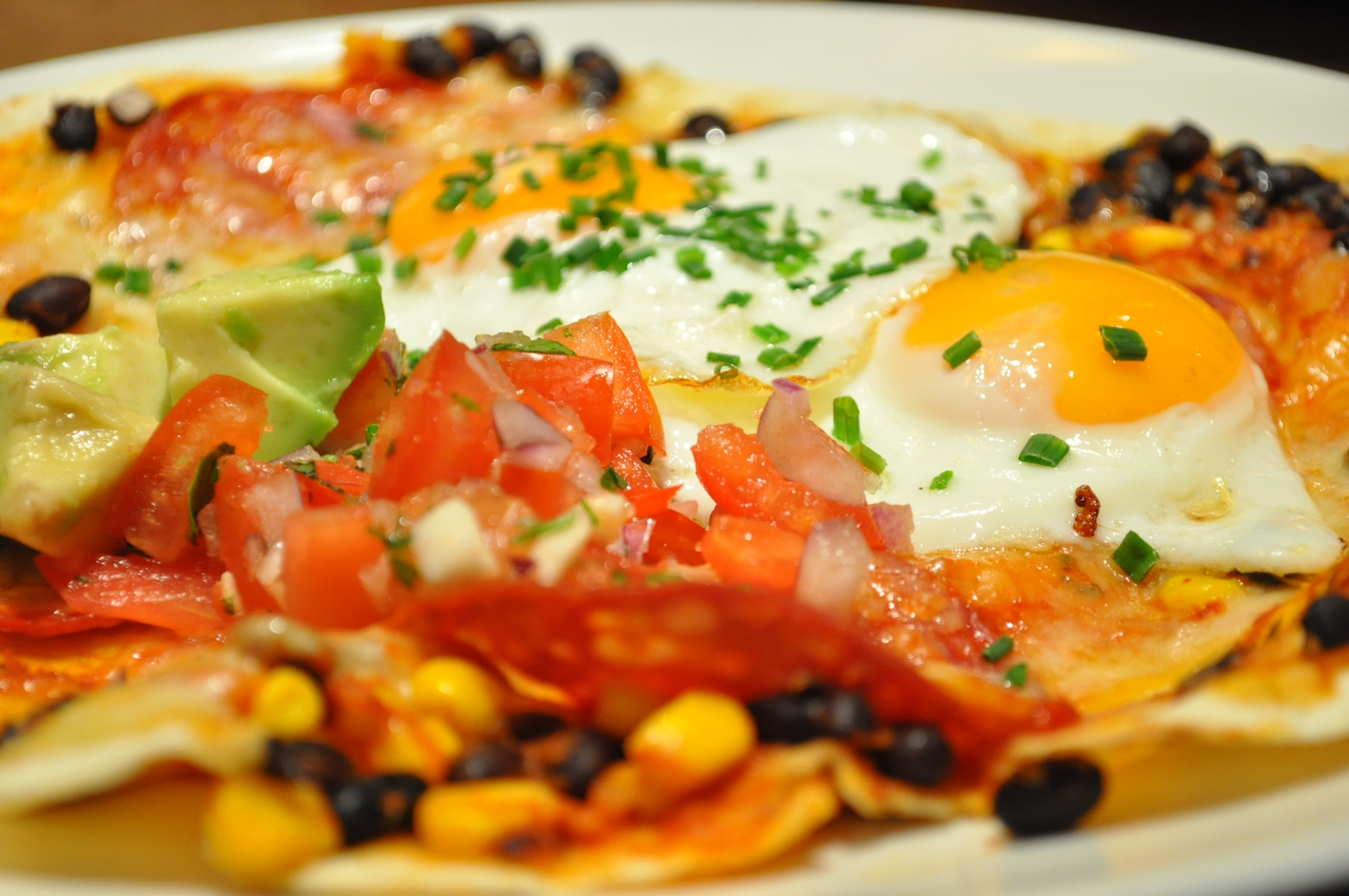
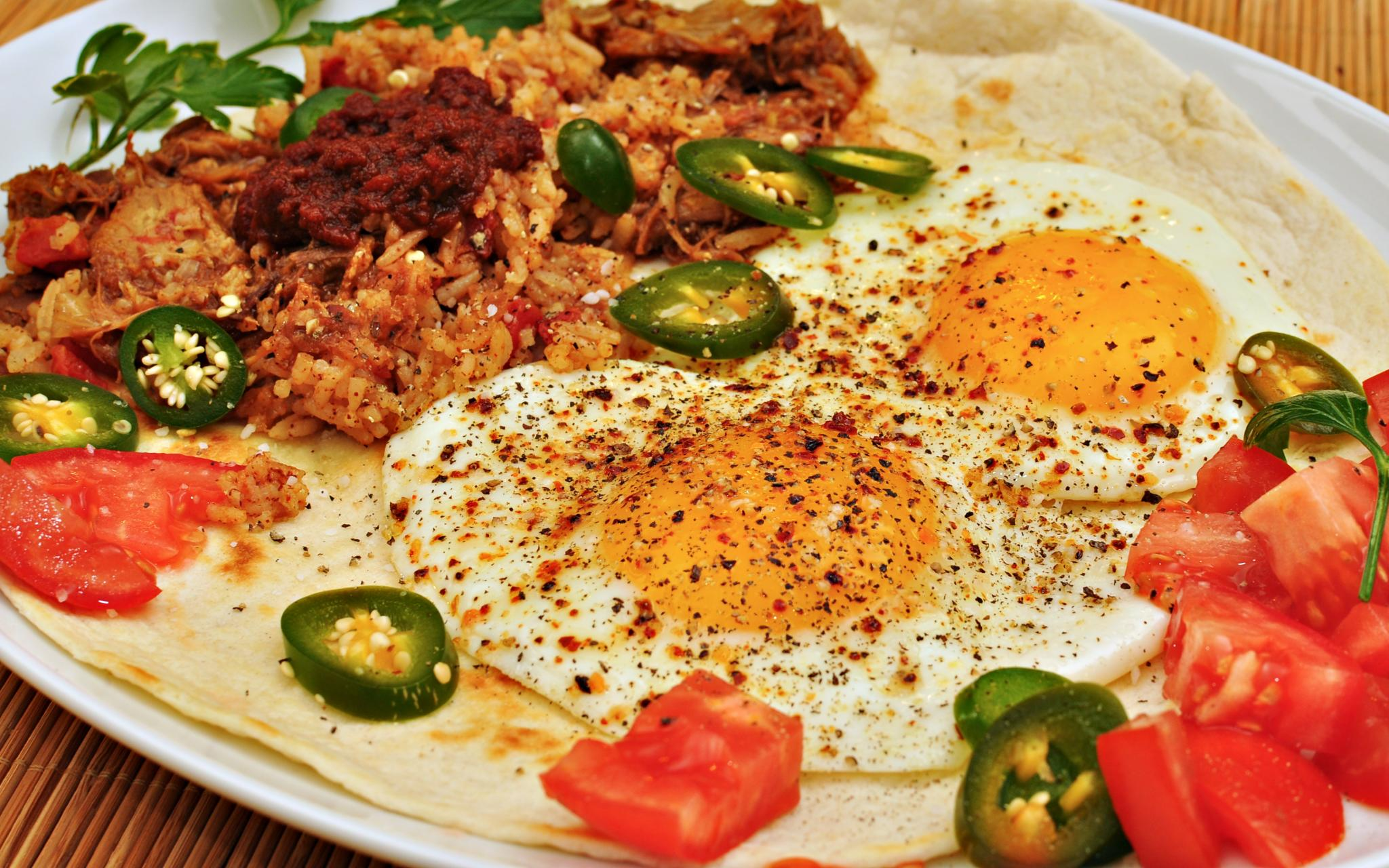
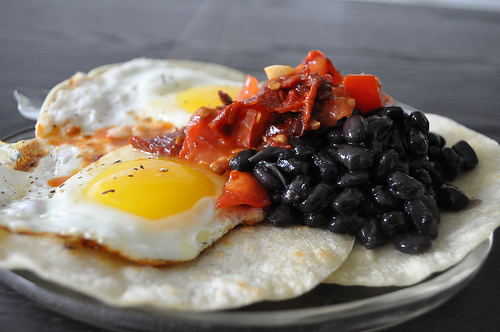
- Different preparations of huevos rancheros
- Course: Breakfast
- Place of origin: Mexico
- Main ingredients: Tortillas, eggs, salsa, refried beans, avocado or guacamole

Huevos rancheros (Spanish pronunciation: [ˈweβos ranˈtʃeɾos], 'ranch-style eggs') is a breakfast egg dish served in the style of the traditional large mid-morning fare on rural Mexican farms.

== History ==
The label "ranchero" refers to the rancheros or vaqueros (cowherds or cowboys), the men in charge of cattle and horses in the Mexican haciendas; the name can be translated as “cowboy eggs”. It was typical among the rancheros to cook their dishes, such as beef, pork, turkey, and even eggs, in a chile sauce (salsa). The original name of the dish, as it appears in 19th century Mexican cookbooks, was "huevos estrellados en chile colorado" (sunny side-up eggs in red chile sauce) or “huevos estrellados en chile verde” (sunny side-up eggs in a green chile sauce); the moniker “rancheros” was applied by people from the cities.

The eggs were simply cooked in a mixture of red or green chile sauce and lard. A recipe for the dish appears in Manuel Galvan Rivera’s “El Nuevo Cocinero Mexicano en Forma de Diccionario” (1845), where it instructs the reader to use pasilla and ancho chiles, both toasted and deveined, and roasted tomatoes for the red salsa, or green chiles and tomatillos for the green salsa. The salsa was then put in a pot with lard to fry, after which the eggs were cracked opened and dropped into it to cook. When ready, they were removed and served sprinkled over with “queso añejo rallado” or grated aged cheese.

Another recipe, but under the name "Huevos Rancheros", appears in a Puebla manual in 1898, and it is the same recipe as the one in Galvan Rivera’s cookbook:

Huevos rancheros - Remove the veins from some pasilla chiles, with a third of the ancho chiles, both deveined, toasted and ground with roasted tomatoes. They are then boiled in a little water and fried in lard, leaving the broth of a medium thickness and well-seasoned with enough salt. The eggs are cracked into it, and when they are ready, they are removed one by one, placing them on the platter. They are then covered with the remaining sauce and sprinkled with grated aged cheese and well-fried, well-browned onions.

In her book Mexico as I saw it (1901), Ethel Brilliana Tweedie, while eating in a Mexico City restaurant, recounts:

“Before the menu arrived, a bundle of knives and forks were thrust on the marble table before us, and sticking on to the ends of the forks were rolls of bread. Dish No. 1 was Huevos Rancheros, which means eggs served ranche fashion. A couple of eggs are fried for a portion, put on to a plate and covered over with chilli sauce. Everything Mexican has chilli in it, and, not infrequently, garlic! How the folk eat all the peppers, chillis, and survive, is marvellous, but they do!”

In all three cases, there is no mention of tortillas or any other side dish, it was simply eggs cooked in a red or green chile sauce.

== Basic dish ==
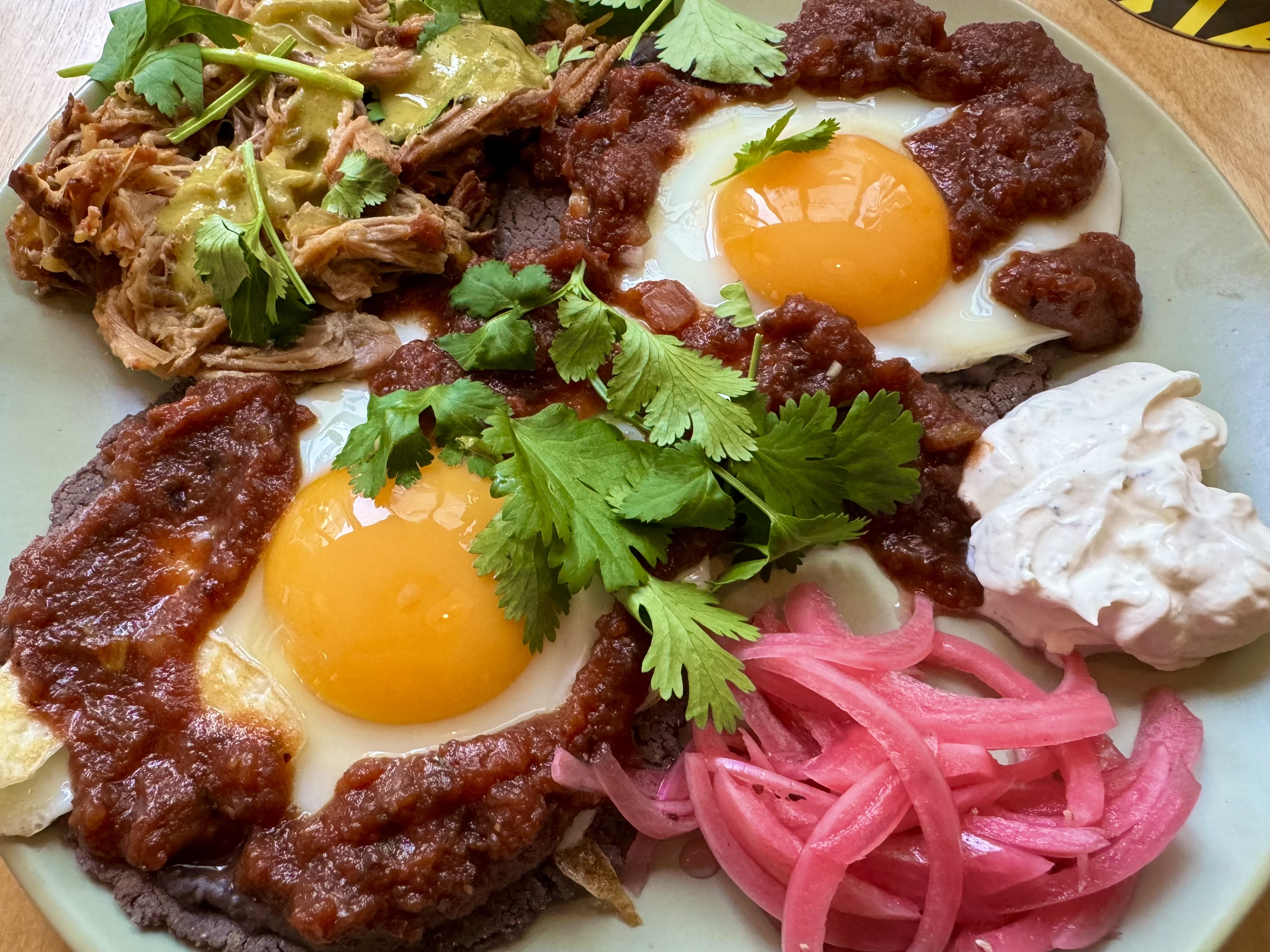
Huevos rancheros with eggs, refried beans, blue corn tortillas, carnitas, salsa, pickled onions, sour cream, and cilantro

The basic dish consists of fried eggs served on lightly fried or charred corn or flour tortillas topped with a spicy salsa made of tomatoes, chili peppers, and onion. Common accompaniments include refried beans, Mexican-style rice, and guacamole or slices of avocado, with cilantro as a garnish.

== Variants ==
As the dish spread beyond Mexico, variations using pureed chile or enchilada sauce instead of tomato-chili pico de gallo have appeared. Non-Mexican additions such as cheese, sour cream, and lettuce also have become common additions beyond the dish's native range.

In New Mexico, huevos rancheros use red or green New Mexico chile instead of ranchero sauce, rarely include rice, and typically include hash browns, refried beans, and melted cheese on top. In some cases, meat is also included.

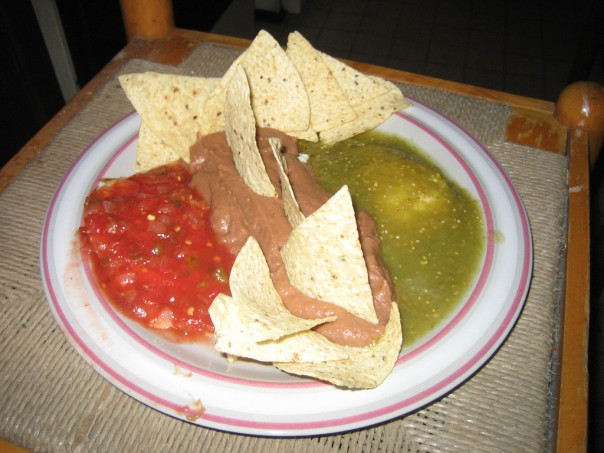
Huevos divorciados

Huevos divorciados (divorced eggs) are simply two eggs served in the same style as huevos rancheros but with a different sauce for each egg – usually a salsa roja and a salsa verde.

Similar dishes are huevos motuleños of Yucatan and New Mexican enchiladas montadas.

Another variation, huevos ahogados or drowned eggs, is a traditional Mexican breakfast of eggs poached in a tomato-chile salsa.

== See also ==
- Huevos motuleños
- List of egg dishes
- List of Mexican dishes
- Menemen
- Shakshouka
