= Matbucha =

Cooked tomato salad

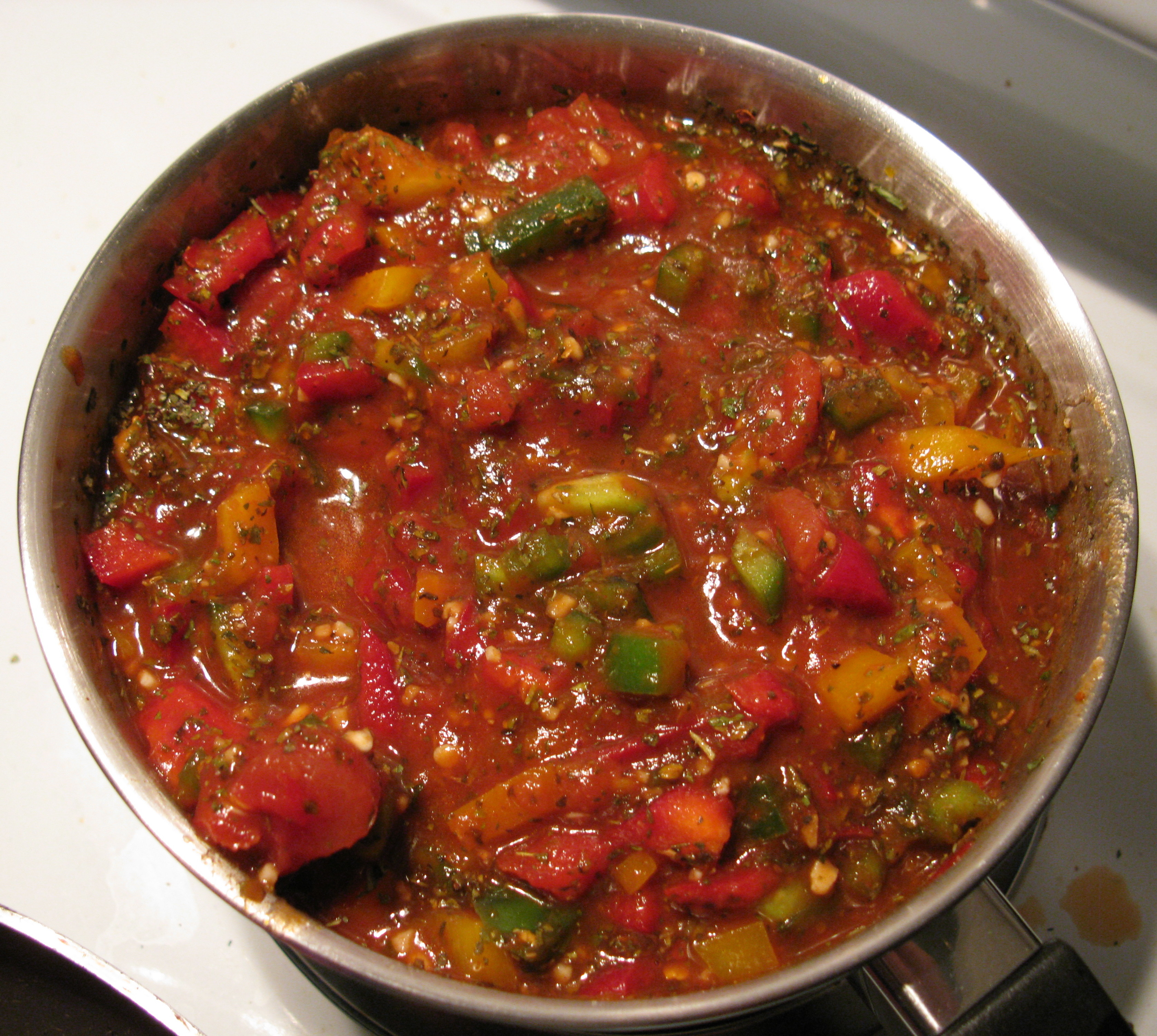
- Course: Appetizer
- Place of origin: Morocco
- Region or state: North Africa
- Created by: Amazigh (Berbers)
- Main ingredients: Tomatoes, bell peppers, garlic, chili peppers

Matbucha (Arabic: مطبوخة, maṭbūkhah; Hebrew: מטבוחה; French: salade cuite) is a North African condiment or cooked salad consisting of cooked tomatoes and roasted bell peppers seasoned with garlic and chili pepper, and slow-cooked for a number of hours. It is traditionally served in North Africa with a traditional Moroccan bread and as a condiment typically served as part of an appetizer, often as part of a salad course. It is a widespread dish in Israel after being introduced by Moroccan Jews and is commonly served for Friday night Shabbat dinner.

== Preparation ==
Matbucha is prepared by cooking tomatoes, bell peppers, chilis, and garlic over low heat for many hours until they cook down into a smooth, thick spread similar to jam in consistency.

== Commercial variants ==
Brands include Sabra (by Osem), Achla (by Strauss-Elite), and others. In recent years, matbucha has become available in the United States under the New York Shuk brand, among several others.

There is also a version made with eggplants.

== See also ==
- List of Moroccan dishes
- List of Israeli dishes
