= Cinema of Benin =

The Cinema of Benin refers to the film industry of the Republic of Benin in West Africa.

== History ==
Sources differ as to the which was the first Beninese film, with some pointing to the short Lumière des hommes (1954, director unknown), with others pointing to the work of Pascal Abikanlou, who made a number of documentaries in the 1960s, followed by his first feature film Sous le signe du vaudou in 1974. Richard De Medeiros was another noted director of the early independence years, beginning with 1970's Le roi est mort en exil, an examination of Béhanzin, the last king of Dahomey. He went on to make the feature-length Le nouveau venu (1972), which explored the issue of corruption and the conflict between modernity and tradition in Benin. François Okioh made a number of short documentaries in the 1980s, as well as the feature-length dramas Ironou (1985) and Enfants de... (1985). Noted filmmakers of the last two decades are Jean Odoutan (Barbecue Pejo, 2000; Pim-Pim Tché, 2010), Idrissou Mora Kpai (Si-Gueriki, la reine-mère, 2002) and Sylvestre Amoussou (Africa Paradis, 2006).

== List of Beninese films ==
This is a sortable list of films produced in Benin.

Year	Title	Director	Genre	Notes
1954	Lumière des hommes	?	Short	English title: Light of Men
1967	Ganvié, mon village	Pascal Abikanlou	Documentary, short	English title: Ganvié, My Village
1968	Escale au Dahomey	Pascal Abikanlou	Documentary, short	English title: Stopover in Dahomey
1969	Premières offrandes	Pascal Abikanlou	Documentary, short	English title: First Offerings
1969	Fête de l'igname	Pascal Abikanlou	Documentary, short	English title: Yam Festival
1970	Le roi est mort en exil	Richard de Medeiros	Drama, short	English title: The King Died in Exile
1971	Opération Sonader	Pascal Abikanlou	Documentary, short	English title: Operation Sonader
1971	De l'eau et de l'ombrage	Pascal Abikanlou	Documentary, short	English title: Water and Shade
1972	Téké, hymne au Borgou	Richard de Medeiros	Documentary, short	English title: Téké, Hymn of Borgou
1972	Silence et feu de brousse	Richard de Medeiros	Drama, short	English title: Silence and Bushfire
1974	Sous le signe du vaudou	Pascal Abikanlou	Drama	English title: Under the Sign of Voodoo
1975	L'Afrique au Rendez-vous de l'Année Sainte	Pascal Abikanlou	Documentary short	English title: Africa at the Rendezvous of the New Year
1976	Le Nouveau venu	Richard De Medeiros	Drama	English title: The Newcomer
1980	Ces Collines ne sont pas muettes	François Okioh	Documentary, short	English title: These Hills are not Silent
1982	Le Fleuve a tout emporté	François Okioh	Documentary, short	English title: The River Swept Everything
1983	Ogu	François Okioh	Documentary, short	
1985	Enfants de...	François Okioh	Drama	English title: Infants of...
1985	Ironou	François Okioh	Drama	
1989	Dan xome royaume des Huegbadjavi	Pascal Abikanlou	Documentary	English title: Dan Xome, Kingdom of Huegbadjavi
1991	Debout les morts	?	Television production	English title: Up the Dead
1991	Les Tresseurs de Corde	François Okioh	Drama	English title: The Mat Cutters
1992	Vent de l'espoir	Pascal Abikanlou	Documentary	English title: Wind of Hope
1993	Ouidah 92	Pascal Abikanlou	Documentary	
1998	Divine carcasse	Dominique Loreau	Drama	English title: Divine Carcass
1999	Génération perdue	M. Pounie		English title: Lost Generation
2000	Barbecue-Pejo	Jean Odoutan	Drama	
2000	Le Pays Idaasha	François Okioh	Drama	English title: Dassa Country
2002	Si-Gueriki, la reine-mère	Idrissou Mora Kpai	Drama	English title: Si-Gueriki, the Queen Mother
2004	La Valse des gros derrières	Jean Odoutan		English: The Waltz of the Big Behinds
2006	Abeni	Tunde Kelani	Drama	Benin-Nigeria co-production
2006	Africa Paradis	Sylvestre Amoussou	Drama/comedy	English title: Africa Paradise
2006	Abeni 2	Tunde Kelani	Drama	Benin-Nigeria co-production
2006	Crânes épais... lèvres fausses	François Okioh	Documentary, short	English title: Thick Skulls... False Lips
2007	L'Amazone candidate	Sanvi Panou	Documentary	English title: The Amazon Candidate
2010	Pim-Pim Tché	Jean Odoutan	Drama	
2010	Shed No Tears	Kaitlyn Summerill	Documentary	
2011	Un pas en avant - Les dessous de la corruption	Sylvestre Amoussou	Comedy	English title: One Step Forward - The Bottom of Corruption
2011	Indochine, sur les traces d'une mère	Idrissou Mora Kpai	Documentary	English title: Indochina: Traces of a Mother
2011	Femme d'Afrique	Milja Viita	Documentary short	English title: Woman of Africa
2011	Larmes de sang	Laitan Faranpojo & Mark Koumagnon		English title: Tears of Blood
2012	La personne de Georges Adéagbo	Matteo Fritelli	Documentary	English title: The Person of Georges Adéagbo
2012	Possessed by Voodoo	Sergey Yastrzhembskiy	Documentary	
2012	The Camp	Jean-Frédéric de Hasque	Documentary	
2014	Dreamcycles	Nelson Roubert	Documentary	
2015	Gangbé!	Arnauld Robert	Documentary	
2016	Vindicte	Ange-Régis Hounkpatin	Drama, short	English title: Retribution
2016	Bight of the Twin	Hazel Hill McCarthy III	Documentary	
2016	Dassa-Zoume	Christophe Blanpied	Documentary, short	
2017	L'orage africain: un continent sous influence	Sylvestre Amoussou	Drama	English title: The African Storm
2017	Studio Harmattan	Stefanos Pavlakis	Experimental short	
2018	In Search of Voodoo: Roots of Heaven	Djimon Hounsou	Documentary	
2018	ZanKlan	Arcade Assogba	Drama, short	
2018	When God is Among Us	Aidan Macaluso	Documentary, short	

== See also ==
- Culture of Benin
- List of African films
