= Pantheon =

Pantheon may refer to:

- Pantheon (religion), a set of gods belonging to a particular religion or tradition, and a temple or sacred building
- Pantheon, Rome, Italy, a Catholic church and former Roman temple

Pantheon may also refer to:

== Buildings and memorials ==
- Pantheon, Rome, Italy, a Catholic church and former Roman temple
- Panthéon, Paris, France, a monument
  - Place du Panthéon, a square
- Pantheon, London, England, an 18th-century place of entertainment
- Pantheon of Illustrious Men, a royal site in Madrid, Spain
- Pantheon of National Revival Heroes, a Bulgarian national monument and ossuary
- Pantheon, Moscow, Russia, a planned but uncompleted memorial tomb
- Pantheon Theatre, Vincennes, Indiana, U.S.
- Pantheon of the House of Braganza, a royal site in Lisbon, Portugal
- National Pantheon, Portugal, a national monument and tomb in Lisbon
- National Pantheon of Venezuela, a burial place and former church in Caracas
- National Pantheon of the Heroes, a national monument in Asunción, Paraguay
- Khojivank Pantheon of Tbilisi, an Armenian architectural complex in Tbilisi, Georgia
- Komitas Pantheon, a cemetery in Yerevan, Armenia
- Mtatsminda Pantheon, a necropolis in Tbilisi, Georgia
- Didube Pantheon, a cemetery in Tbilisi, Georgia
- Saburtalo Pantheon, a necropolis in Tbilisi, Georgia
- Panteón Nacional Román Baldorioty de Castro, a burial place in Ponce, Puerto Rico
- National Pantheon of the Dominican Republic, a former church and burial place in Santo Domingo
- Panteón de Marinos Ilustres, a naval memorial in Cádiz, Spain
- Panteón de San Fernando, a burial place in Mexico City
- Tancredo Neves Pantheon of the Fatherland and Freedom, a monument in Brasília, Brazil

== Arts and entertainment ==
=== Comics ===
- Pantheon (Marvel Comics), a fictional organization
- Pantheon (Lone Star Press), a comic book series
- Pantheon, a 2010 four-issue comic book limited series by IDW Publishing

=== Gaming ===
- Pantheon (role-playing game), a 2000 book
- Pantheon: Rise of the Fallen, a massively multiplayer online role-playing game
- Pantheon, an unreleased computer game by Frog City Software

=== Other uses in arts and entertainment ===
- Panthéon (album), by Booba, 2004
- Pantheon (Dance Gavin Dance album), an album by Dance Gavin Dance, 2025
- "Pantheon", a song by InMe from the 2012 album The Pride
- Pantheon (book), a 12th-century book by Gottfried von Viterbo
- The Pantheon, a 1798 collection of written pieces compiled by Nikolay Karamzin
- Pantheon Books, a Random House imprint
- Pantheon (film), a 2017 French short film
- Pantheon (TV series), an American animated drama TV series
- Pantheon, Rome (photograph), a 1990 Thomas Struth photograph

== Other uses ==
- Pantheon (desktop environment), a Linux desktop environment
- Pantheon (mythical creature), a mythical or imaginary creature used in heraldry, particularly in Britain
- Pantheon (roller coaster), at Busch Gardens Williamsburg, U.S.
- Pantheon (software), a web development platform
- Pantheon, a production company established by Jean-Pierre Isbouts

== See also ==
- Panthea (disambiguation)
- Parthenon (disambiguation)
  - Parthenon, a former temple on the Athenian Acropolis, Greece
- Pantheon ad Lucem, a 2004 collection by designer Alexander McQueen
- Panthéon Club, a political group of the French Revolution
- Pantheon Fossae, a geological feature on Mercury
- Pantheon High, a manga
