= Assogba =

Assogba is both a given name and a surname. Notable people with the name include:

- Assogba Oké (1903–1973), Beninese politician
- Arcade Assogba, Beninese filmmaker
- Nestor Assogba (1929–2017), Beninese Catholic archbishop
- Youssouf Assogba (born 2001), Beninese footballer
