= Panthea (disambiguation) =

Panthea is a genus of the owlet moth family.

Panthea may also refer to:

== People ==
- Julia Drusilla (16–38), a member of the Roman imperial family, given the title of "Panthea" upon her death
- Panthea, mistress of Lucius Verus (130–169), co-emperor of Ancient Rome
- Panthea, pen name of Sophia Dobson Collet (1822–1894), English feminist freethinker
- Panthea Grant Boone, second wife of Lilburn Boggs, sixth governor of Missouri

== Fictional characters ==
- Panthea, in the Jacobean stage play A King and No King
- Panthea, in the lyrical drama Prometheus Unbound by Shelley
- Panthea, in the 1953 American film Slaves of Babylon
- Lady Panthea Vyne, in the UK television movie The Lady and the Highwayman
- Panthea Vyse, in the audio drama The Diet of Worms
- Queen Panthea, antagonist of the CGI animated television series Mia and Me

== Other uses ==
- Panthea (film), a 1917 American silent drama film
- Panthea; or, the Captive bride, a tragedy, a 1789 work by Thomas Maurice
- Panthea, an American ship - see List of shipwrecks in January 1827
- Panthea, a poem by Oscar Wilde

== See also ==
- Pantheon (disambiguation)
