= Idrissou Mora-Kpai =

Beninese-American filmmaker

- Born: Idrissou Mora-Kpai; July 14, 1967 (age 59); Béroubouay, Benin
- Education: MFA Film Production
- Alma mater: Konrad Wolf Film University of Babelsberg; Free University of Berlin
- Occupations: Director, producer, screenwriter, editor, lecturer
- Years active: 1996–present
- Awards: Recipient of the John Simon Guggenheim Memorial Foundation Fellowship, and Prince Claus Fund
- Website: https://idrimora.com

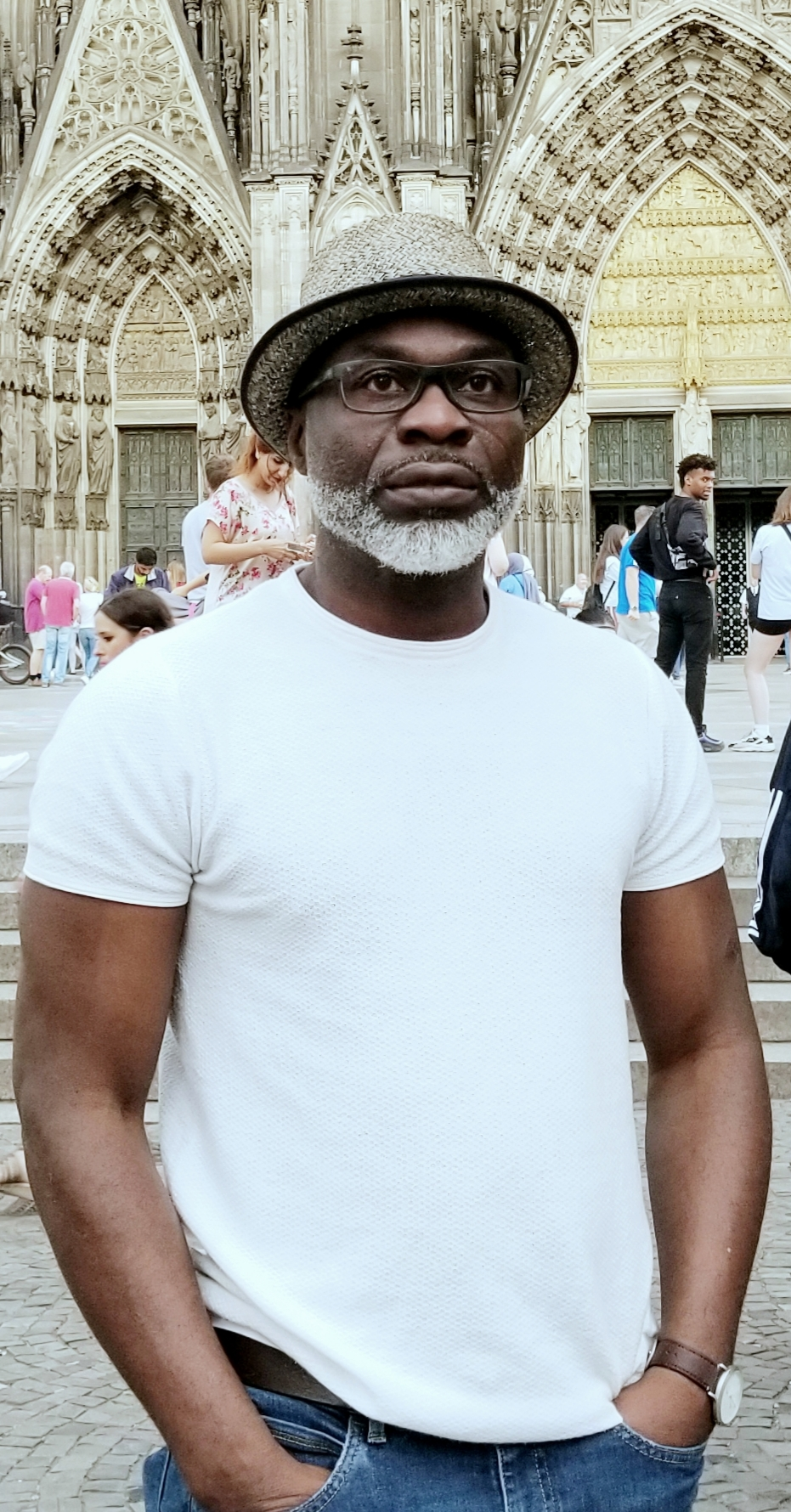

Idrissou Mora-Kpai (born 14 July 1967), is a Beninese-American filmmaker. He is most notable as the director of critically acclaimed films Indochina Traces of a Mother, Arlit The Second Paris, and Si-Gueriki The Queen Mother. He is a recipient of the John Simon Guggenheim Memorial Foundation Fellowship and the Dutch Prince Claus Award

== Personal life ==
He was born on 14 July 1967 in Béroubouay, Northern Benin to a family of commercial cattle farmers. His father was Mora-Kpai Sounon Dangnon and mother was Bougnon Yarou Signangui.

He graduated with M.A. degree at the Konrad Wolf Film University of Babelsberg, Germany. He also worked as a visiting lecturer at Cornell University, Duke University, University of Pittsburgh and Ithaca College. Currently he lives in the US. As of 2024 Mora-Kpai accepted an associate professorship at Pratt Institute in Brooklyn, New York.

== Career ==
At the age of 13, he moved to Cotonou and attended high school. At the age of 19, he went to Algeria and then emigrated via Italy to Germany. Then he studied North American studies at the Free University of Berlin from 1988 to 1993. After the graduation, he studied film production at the Konrad Wolf Film University from 1994 to 1999. During this university period, he made several two short films, Transient and Fake Soldiers.

In 1999, Idrissou moved to Paris and made his maiden documentary,Si-Gueriki in 2002. The film received critical acclaim and international attention. It was screened at the International Film Festival Rotterdam (IFFR), Cinema du Réel, Paris and the Copenhagen International Film Festival (CIFF). The film later awarded Best Documentary Award at the Festival International du Film Francophone de Namur.

In 2002, he founded the production company 'MKJ Films'. With the production house, he produced two other films; Arlit The Second Paris was screened at The Berlin International Film Festival at the Sheffield International Documentary Festival and was subsequently awarded, among others, the Best Documentary Award and the TV5 Award at the Festival International du Film Francophone de Namur, the best documentary award at the Asian and Latin American Film Festival, Milan, the best documentary award at the Muestra de Cine Africano de Tarifa. His film Indochina Traces of a Mother produced with the same company, was screened at the Busan International Film Festival, at the Cannes International Film Festival, French Institute Screening. The film attracted the media’s attention due to exposing a hitherto little know piece of history about African Soldiers fighting for in the French Indochina war. Indochina was awarded the best documentary award at the Alger International Film Festival.

In 2019, he made the documentary film America Street. It explores the daily struggles of an African-American community in Charleston, South Carolina after the 2015 Walter Scott killing. The film received critical acclaim and was screened at several film festivals, including FID Marseille.

In 2026, he completed another documentary, Border Life, which screened at the Dakhla International Film Festival in Morocco in June of that year. He also directed the short narrative film The Waiting Room, which is currently in post-production.

== Filmography ==
Year	Film	Role	Genre	Ref.
1996	Transient	Director, producer, writer, editor	Short film	
1999	Fake Soldiers	Director, writer	Short film	
2002	Si-Gueriki, la reine-mère	Director	Documentary	
2005	Arlit: The Second Paris	Director, producer, writer	Documentary	
2011	Indochina Traces of a Mother	Director, producer	Documentary	
2019	America Street	Director, producer, cinematographer	Documentary	
2026	Border Life	Director, producer, cinematographer	Documentary	

== See also ==
- Cinema of Africa
- Cinema of Benin
