= Ange-Régis Hounkpatin =

Franco-Beninese filmmaker

- Born: Ange-Régis Hounkpatin; Cotonou, Benin
- Occupations: Director, producer, screenwriter
- Years active: 1979–present

Ange-Régis Hounkpatin, is a French–Beninese filmmaker and screenwriter.

== Personal life ==
He was born and raised in Cotonou, Benin.

== Career ==
After high school graduation, Hounkpatin moved to France to study literature. Eventually he entered the Femis school for cinema in 2009. He made the film Rêves de lions while in his final-year and later won the Youth Award at the Côté Court Festival of Pantin in 2014. His film Cage was then selected at the Champs-Élysées Film Festival in 2016. In 2015, he made the film Vindicte which was shot in Benin and was selected at the Paris Courts Devant Festival in 2016. The film also won the Best Cinematography award at the Feedback Film Festival in Toronto.

In 2017, he directed his fifth short-movie Pantheon. The film received critical acclaim and officially selected to screen at The African Film Festival 2017, the Atlanta Film Festival 2018 and the Filmfest Dresden 2018. The film won the Bridging the Borders Award at Palm Springs International Festival of Short Films 2017. In the same year, the film received Honorable Mention at Kolkata International Film Festival.

== Filmography ==
Year	Film	Role	Genre	Ref.
2013	Rêves de lions	Director, writer	Short film	
2015	Vindicte	Director, writer	Short film	
2016	Cage	Director, writer	Short film	
2017	Panthéon	Director, writer	Short film	

== See also ==
- Cinema of Benin
