= Basilica of Nuestra Señora de Atocha =

Church in central Madrid, Spain

Royal Basilica of Our Lady of Atocha
- Real Basílica de Nuestra Señora de Atocha
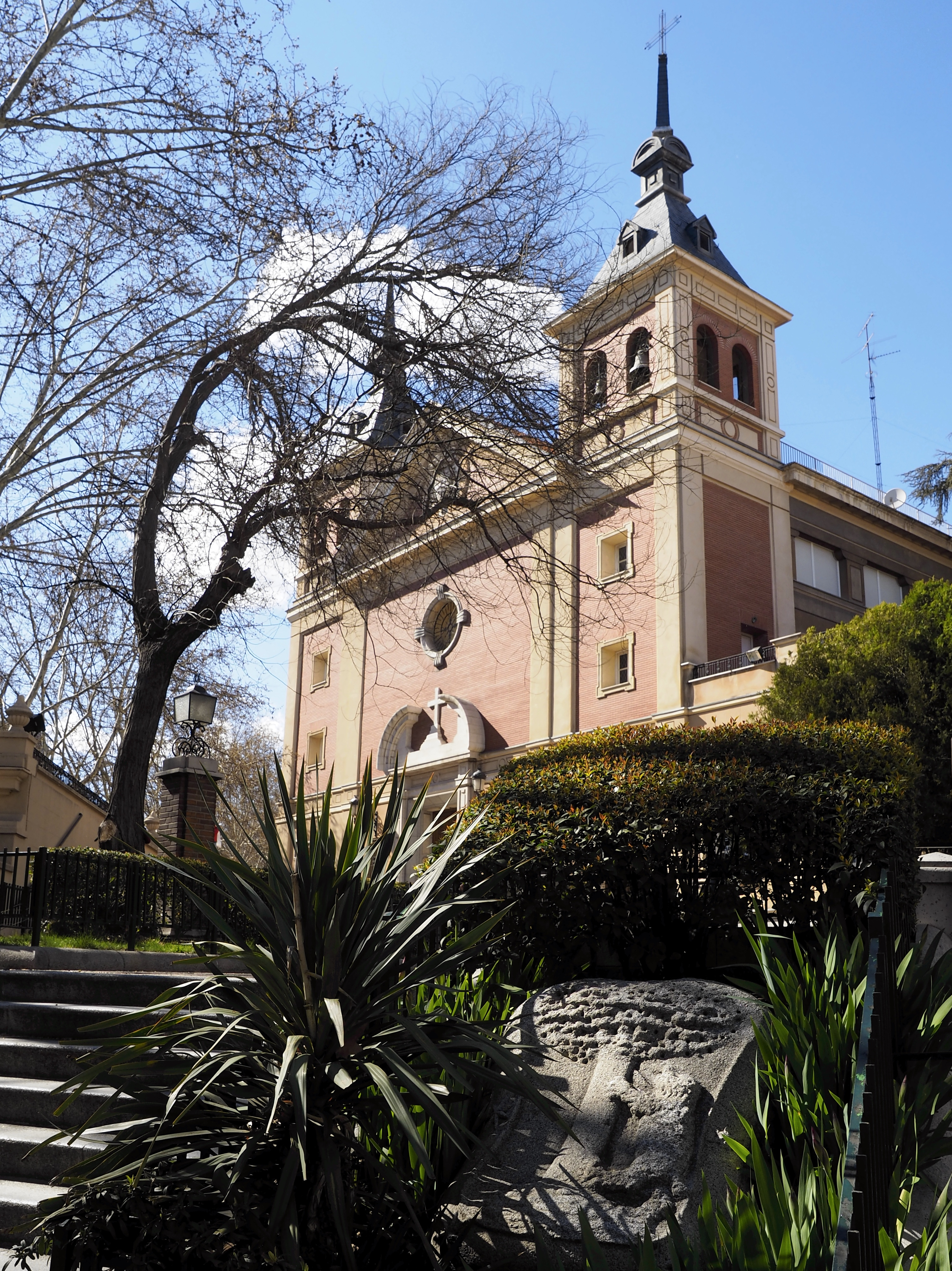
- Main façade of the basilica

- Location of the Cathedral in Madrid

Religion
- Affiliation: Roman Catholic Church
- Province: Archdiocese of Madrid
- Rite: Roman
- Ecclesiastical or organisational status: Active
- Patron: Our Lady of Atocha
- Year consecrated: 1150
- Status: Basilica

Location
- Location: Madrid, Spain
- Coordinates: 40°24′19.17″N 3°40′59.57″W

Architecture
- Type: Church
- Style: Herrerian
- Groundbreaking: 1150
- Completed: 1951

Website
- Website of the Basilica

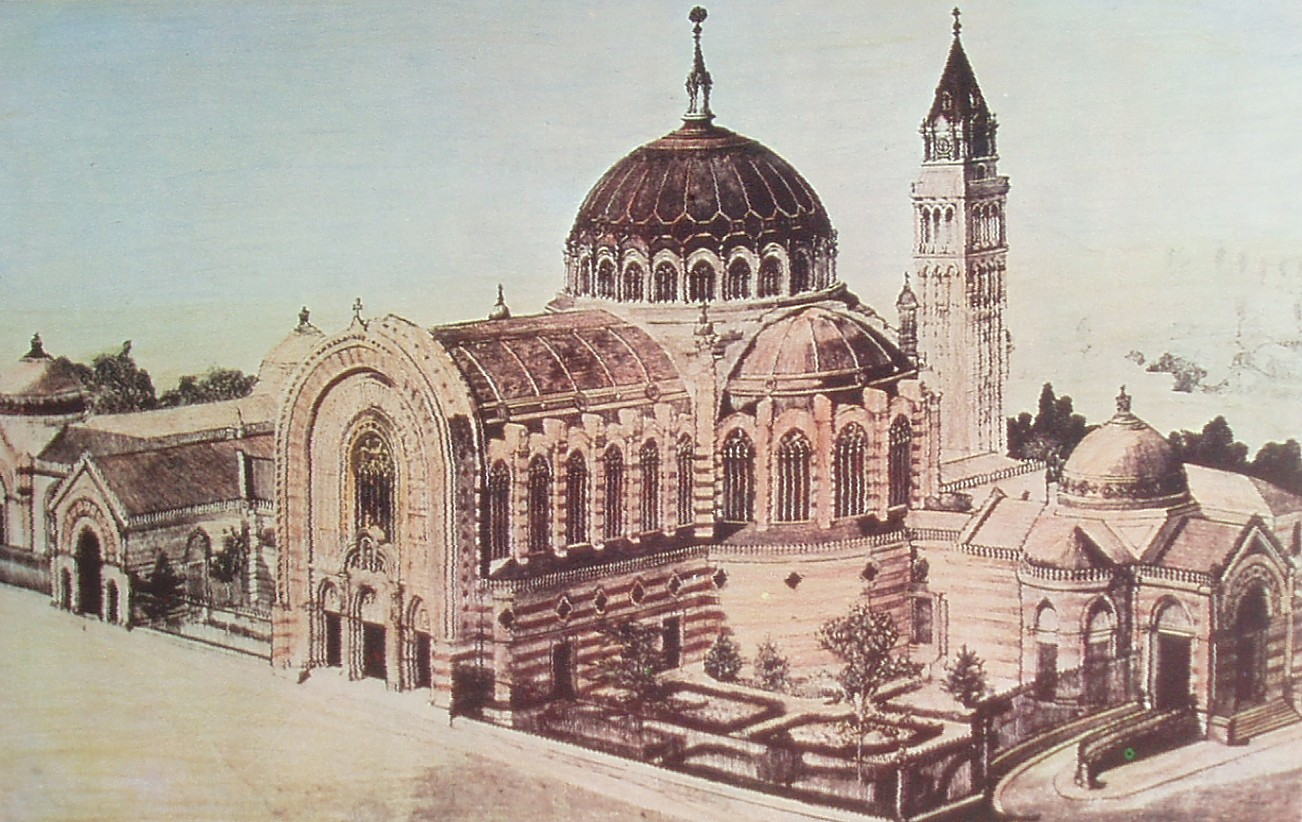
Original project by Fernando Arbós y Tremanti for the basilica, belltower, and pantheon.

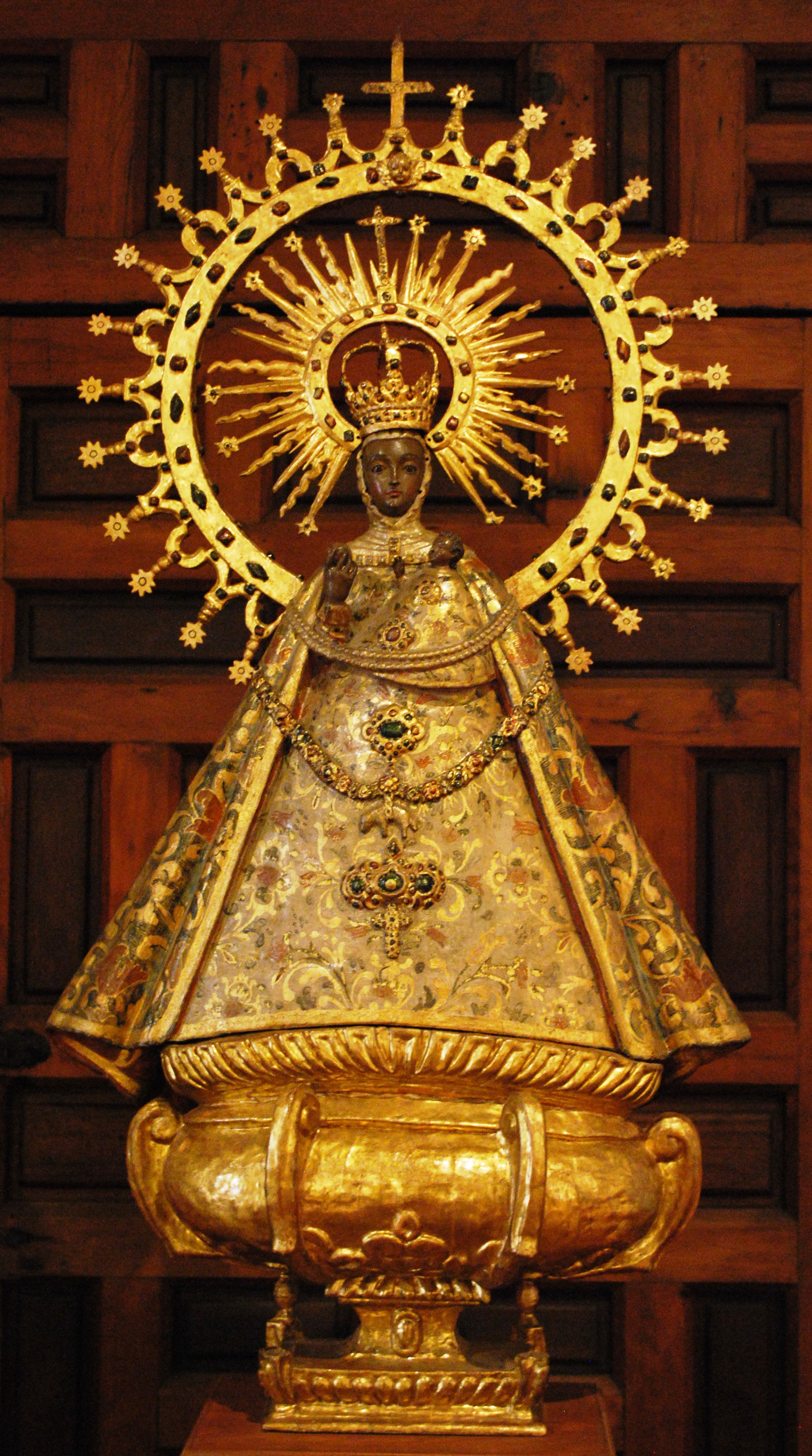
Our Lady of Atocha with rich dresses.

The Royal Basilica of Our Lady of Atocha or Real Basílica de Nuestra Señora de Atocha is a large church in central Madrid on Avenida de la Ciudad de Barcelona, 1. It is run by the Dominican order.

== History ==
It is one of the six basilica churches in Madrid, alongside the Our Father Jesús de Medinaceli, San Francisco el Grande, St. Michael's Basilica, Madrid, Basílica Hispanoamericana de Nuestra Señora de la Merced, and Church of La Milagrosa.

The buildings on the site have a long history. The original name refers to a lost icon from a chapel which was found among some high grasses -referred to as tocha- during the time of the Reconquista. The site was given to the Dominican order in 1523 by concession of Pope Adrian VI. The old church was in disrepair and rebuilt in the 1890s in a Neo-Byzantine style designed by Fernando Arbós y Tremanti.

The church was destroyed on 20 July 1936 during the Spanish Civil War. Its reconstruction was completed in 1951.

Adjacent to the church is the Pantheon of Illustrious Men or Panteón de Hombres Ilustres of Madrid. It holds the remains of only a former president of the council of ministers, José Canalejas, however it also contains a number of interesting monuments from and just after the turn of the 19th century.

== See also ==
- Catholic Church in Spain
- List of oldest church buildings
