= Pantheon (film) =

2017 French short film by Ange-Régis Hounkpatin

- Film poster
- Directed by: Ange-Régis Hounkpatin
- Written by: Ange-Régis Hounkpatin
- Produced by: Myrina Mané
- Starring: William Edimo; Bass Dhem; Sophia Elisabeth; Hugo Marí
- Cinematography: Noé Bach
- Edited by: Marie Estelle Dieterle
- Music by: Alexandre Verbiese
- Production company: TS Productions
- Release date: 22 June 2017 (United States)
- Running time: 25 minutes
- Country: France
- Language: French

Pantheon is a 2017 French short film directed by Ange-Régis Hounkpatin and produced by Myrina Mané for TS Productions. The film stars William Edimo in the lead role along with Bass Dhem, Sophia Elisabeth and Hugo Marí. The film rotates around Saloman, a 35 years old taxi driver who is a son of a Beninese immigrant.

The film had its premier on 22 June 2017 at Palm Springs International Film Festival, USA. The film received critical acclaim and was officially selected to screen at The African Film Festival 2017, the Atlanta Film Festival 2018 and the Filmfest Dresden 2018. The film won the Bridging the Borders Award at the Palm Springs International Festival of Short Films 2017. In the same year, the film received Honorable Mention at Kolkata International Film Festival.

== Cast ==
- William Edimo as Saloman
- Bass Dhem as Elias
- Sophia Elisabeth as Melanie CIA Agent
- Hugo Marí as Oba
