= Church of Saint Manuel and Saint Benedict =

- Iglesia de San Manuel y San Benito (Spanish)
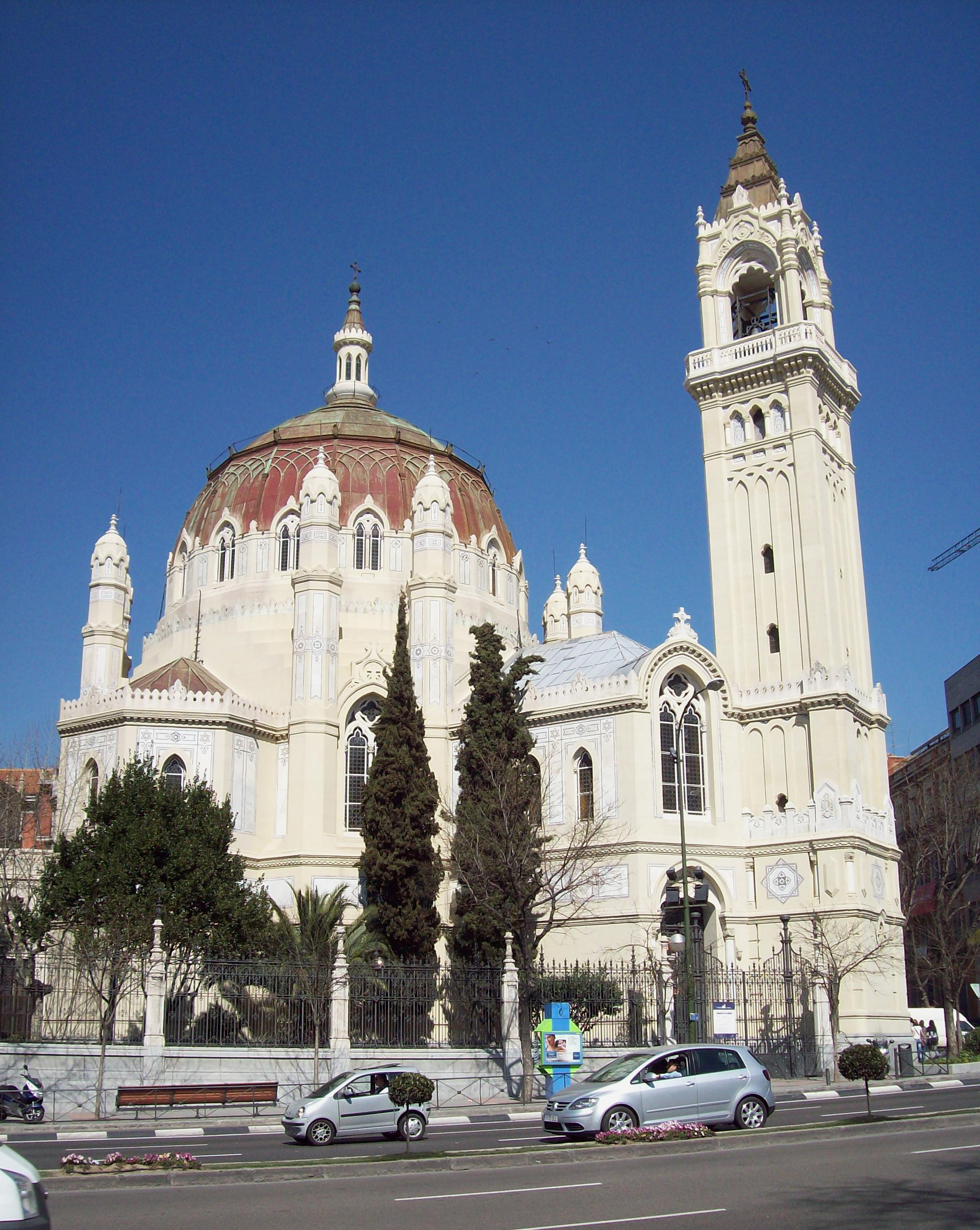

- Location within Spain
- 40.420794°N 3.6861°W
- Location: Madrid, Spain

Spanish Cultural Heritage
- Official name: Iglesia de San Manuel y San Benito
- Type: Non-movable
- Criteria: Monument
- Designated: 1982
- Reference no.: RI-51-0004652

Saint Manuel and Saint Benedict (Spanish: San Manuel y San Benito) is a Catholic church located in Madrid, Spain.

The building, which was designed by Fernando Arbós y Tremanti, was built at the beginning of the twentieth century in Neo-Byzantine style. It was declared Bien de Interés Cultural in 1982.

== See also ==
- Catholic Church in Spain
