= Arcade Assogba =

Beninese filmmaker

- Born: Arcade Assogba; Benin
- Education: Institut Cinématographique de Ouidah
- Occupations: Director, writer, producer
- Years active: 2002–present

Arcade Assogba, is a Beninese filmmaker. He has contributed vastly to the cinema of Benin by making several workshops for digital communication for various major cultural events in Benin such as International Film Festival of Ouidah and the Benin International Theater Festival, Fitheb. He is also notable as the director critically acclaimed short film, ZanKlan.

== Personal life ==
From 2006 to 2009, Assogba studied cinema at the Institut Cinématographique de Ouidah (ICO). Then he obtained a master's degree in human and social sciences from Paris 1 Pantheon Sorbonne University and his master's degree in Law from the University of Abomey-Calavi in Benin.

== Career ==
Assogba started cinema career as a first assistant director on several feature films shot in Benin. He collaborated with renowned international directors such as Sylvestre Amoussou, Jean Odoutan, Pablo César and Heidi Specogna and Pascale Obolo in several documentary films. In 2018, he made his directorial debut with the documentary Crossing.... After the success of the film, he made the Short ZanKlan in the same year. The short received positive reviews from critics and screened and won awards at several film festivals. In 2019, the film won 2nd best prize at Rebiap festival international de films, Benin.

== Filmography ==
Year	Film	Role	Genre	Ref.
2004	Braves de la route des esclaves	Director	Film	
2010	Pim-Pim Tché	Second assistant director	Film	
2010	Das Schiff des Torjägers	unit manager	Documentary	
2011	Un pas en avant - Les dessous de la corruption	Second assistant director	Film	
2018	La Traversée…	Director, writer	Documentary	
2018	ZanKlan	Director, writer, producer	Short film	
2019	A living tree means a living planet	Director	Documentary	

== See also ==
- Festival de Baía das Gatas
