= Fernando Arbós y Tremanti =

Spanish architect (1844–1916)

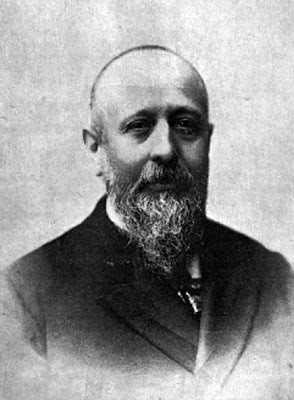
Fernando Arbós (date unknown)

Fernando Arbós y Tremanti (22 October 1844, Rome - 18 December 1916, Madrid) was a Spanish architect; best known for the Iglesia de San Manuel y San Benito.

== Life and work ==
He was born in Rome to the painter, Manuel Arbós, and his wife Gertrudis. From 1862 to 1865, he studied the fine arts in Paris. In 1869, he began to study architecture in Madrid. The following year, together with José María Aguilar y Vela, he won a competition for a public project, sponsored by the "Monte de Piedad y Caja de Ahorros de Madrid" (now known simply as the Caja Madrid).

After completing that project, he continued to work for them; designing their headquarters, in the Plaza de Celenque (now demolished), and their Casa de las Alhajas (House of Jewelry), in the nearby Plaza de San Martín, which is still in use as an exhibition hall. He also designed La Casa Encendida, another bank building which is now a cultural center, and structures for the "Necrópolis del Este", now known as the Cementerio de la Almudena (1877).

When the original Basilica of Nuestra Señora de Atocha was demolished in 1890 and the streets were realigned, the Board of Trustees held a competition for a new temple. Arbós was awarded first prize and oversight of the project, but it was never fully realized. Only the cloister and the bell tower were completed. The cloister is now part of the Pantheon of Illustrious Men. The unfinished temple was severely damaged during the Spanish Civil War. It was eventually demolished and rebuilt.

== Selected projects ==
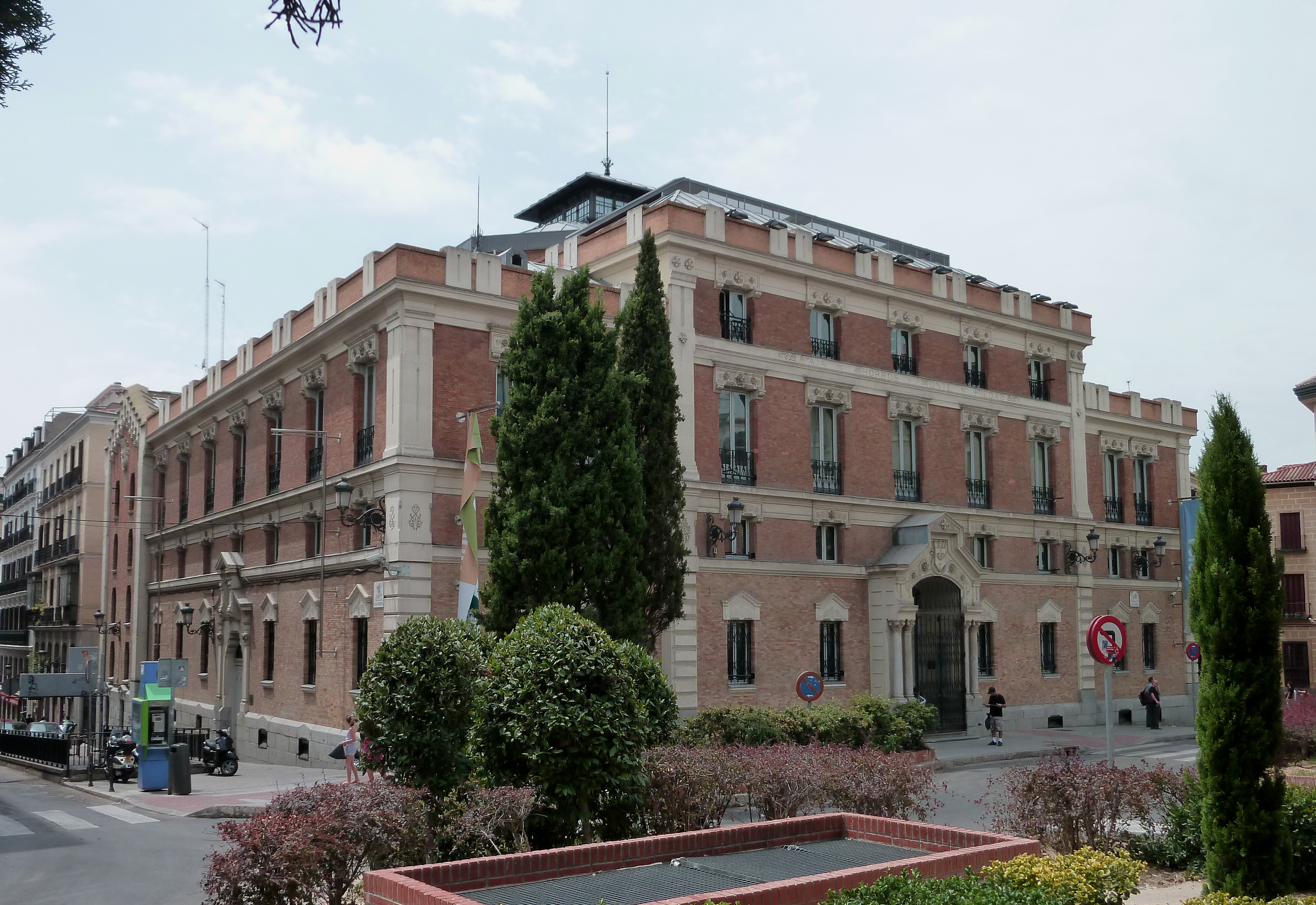
Casa de las Alhajas

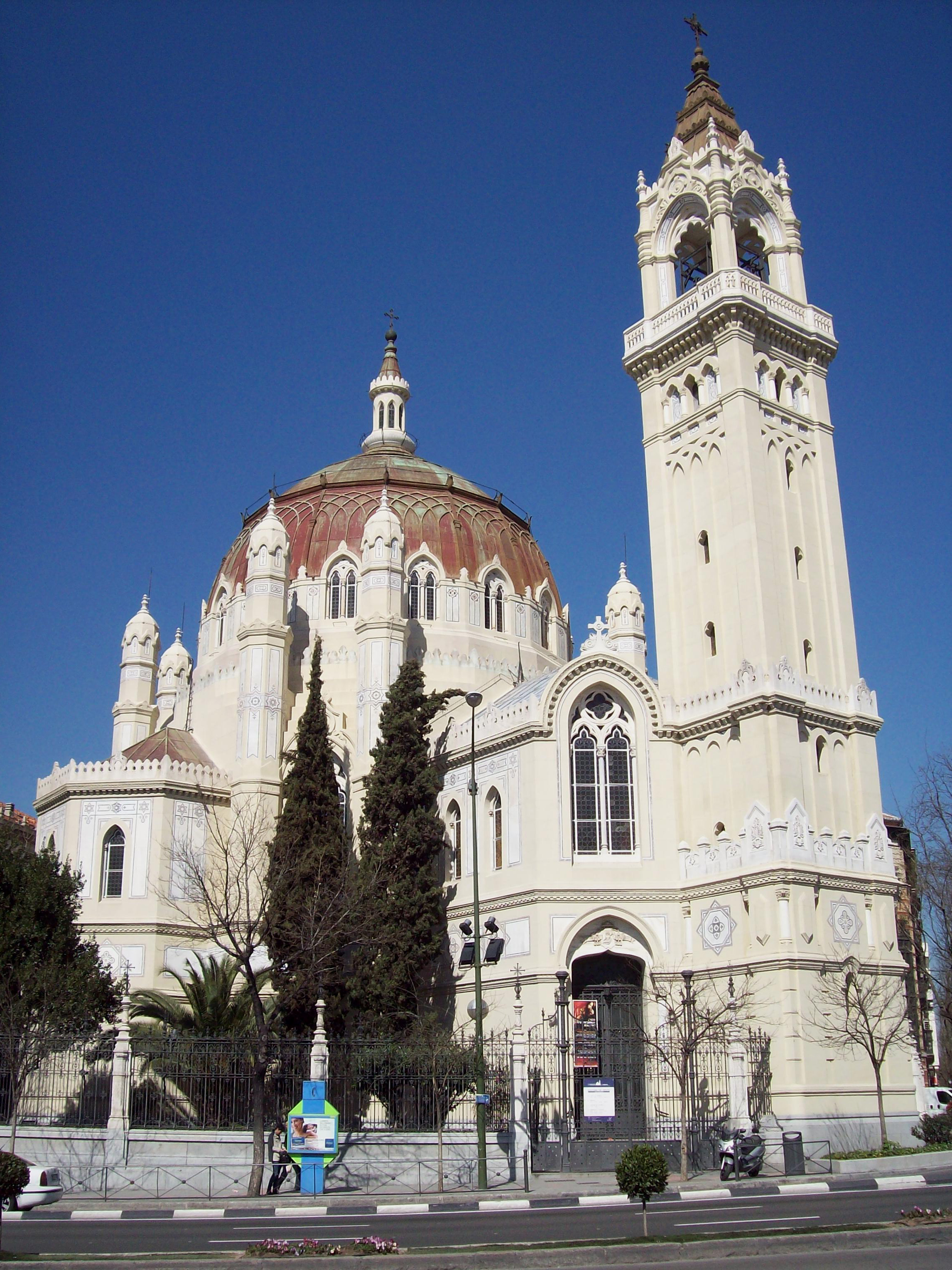
Iglesia de San Manuel y San Benito

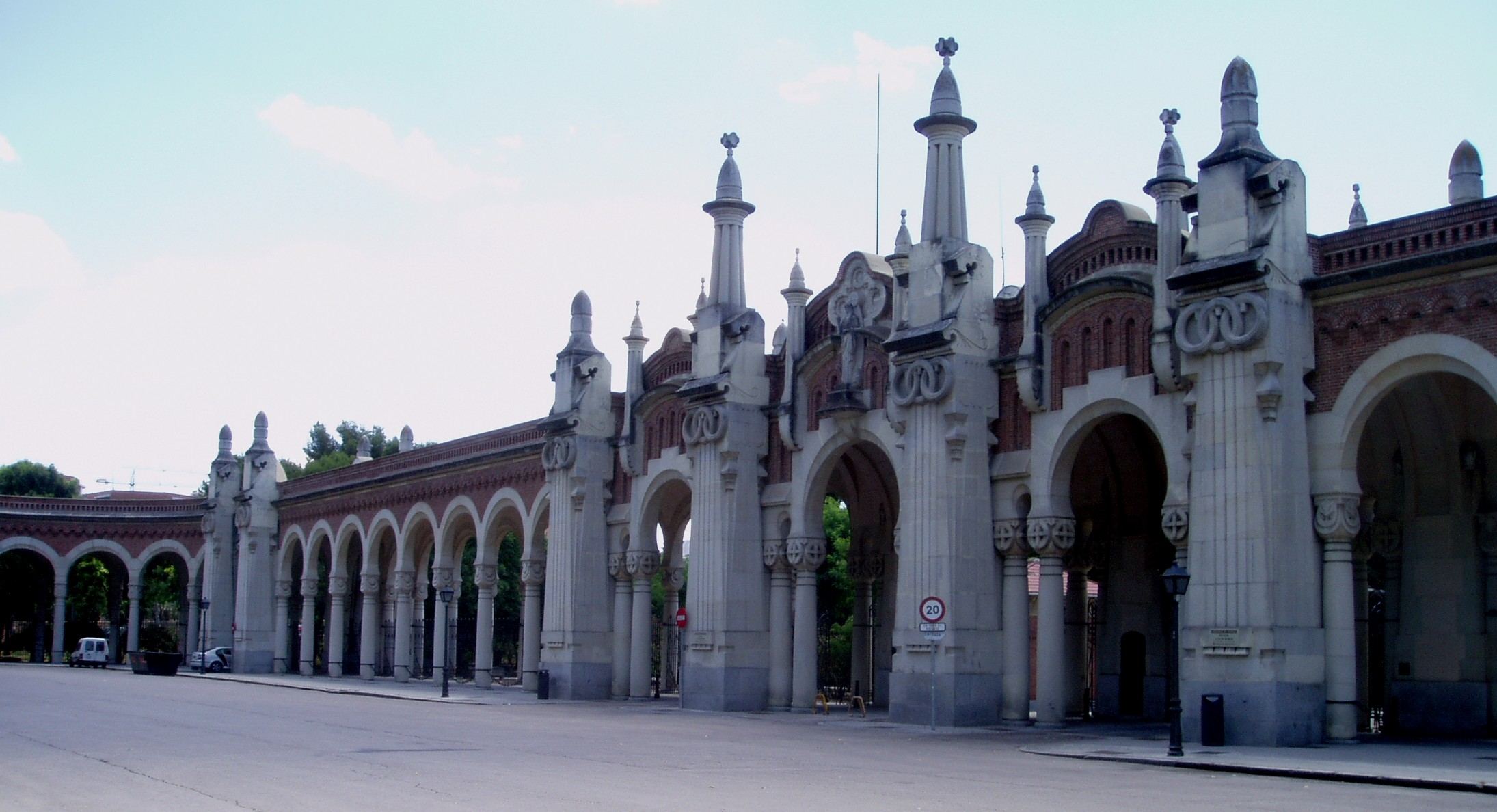
Cementerio de la Almudena (entrance)

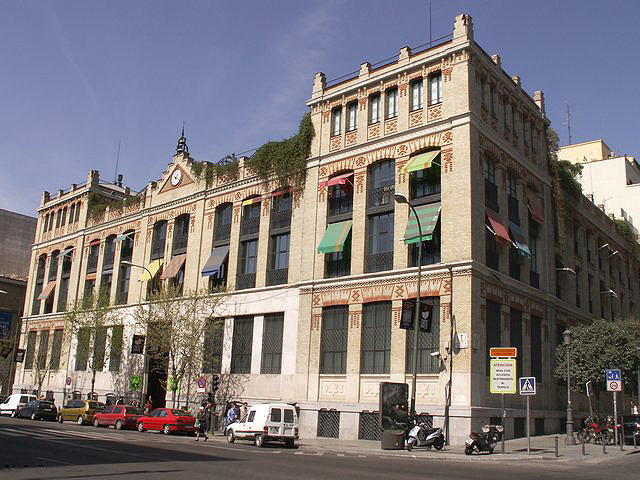
Casa Encendida
