= Parthenon (disambiguation) =

The Parthenon is a former temple in Athens, Greece.

Parthenon may also refer to:

- Parthenon, Arkansas
- Parthenon (Nashville), a replica of the Athens Parthenon
- The Parthenon (newspaper), a student newspaper of Marshall University
- The Parthenon (painting), an 1871 painting by Frederic Edwin Church
- Parthenon: Rise of the Aegean, a board game
- The Parthenon (mountain), a mountain of the Du Cane Range, in Tasmania, Australia

== See also ==
- Pantheon (disambiguation)
- Operation Parthenon, a 1964 British plan for military intervention in Zanzibar
- Parthenon Zihuatanejo, the palatial house of Arturo Durazo Moreno in Mexico
