= Stefanos Pavlakis =

Greek filmmaker

- Born: Stefanos Pavlakis; 1974 (age 51–52); Athens, Greece
- Education: Edinburgh Napier University; University of Dundee; Duncan of Jordanstone College of Art and Design
- Occupations: Director, writer, producer
- Years active: 2005–present
- Website: https://www.stefanos-pavlakis.com

Stefanos Pavlakis (born 1974), is a Greek filmmaker and writer. He has contributed vastly to the cinema of Benin by making critically acclaimed documentaries, The Eye of the Beholder, Studio Harmattan and Drive Through.

== Personal life ==
In 2003, he completed a B.A. in Film & Photography at Edinburgh Napier University. Then in 2005, he graduated with an M.F.A. and later Ph.D. from the University of Dundee, Duncan of Jordanstone College of Art and Design.

== Career ==
In 2009, he started collaborating with the two Berlin-based companies 'Expedere', 'The Story Factory' and produced short documentaries, advertisements and performative events.

== Filmography ==
Year	Film	Role	Genre	Ref.
2009	Backgrounds Up Front	Producer, editor	Short film	
2014	The Eye of the Beholder	Director, producer, writer, cinematographer, editor	Documentary short	
2015	Drive Through	Director, producer, writer, cinematographer, editor, actor, art director	Short film	
2017	Studio Harmattan	Director, producer, writer, cinematographer, editor	Documentary short	

== See also ==
- Cinema of Benin
