= La Casa Encendida =

Building in Madrid, Spain

Coordinates: 40°24′21.41″N 3°41′59.04″W

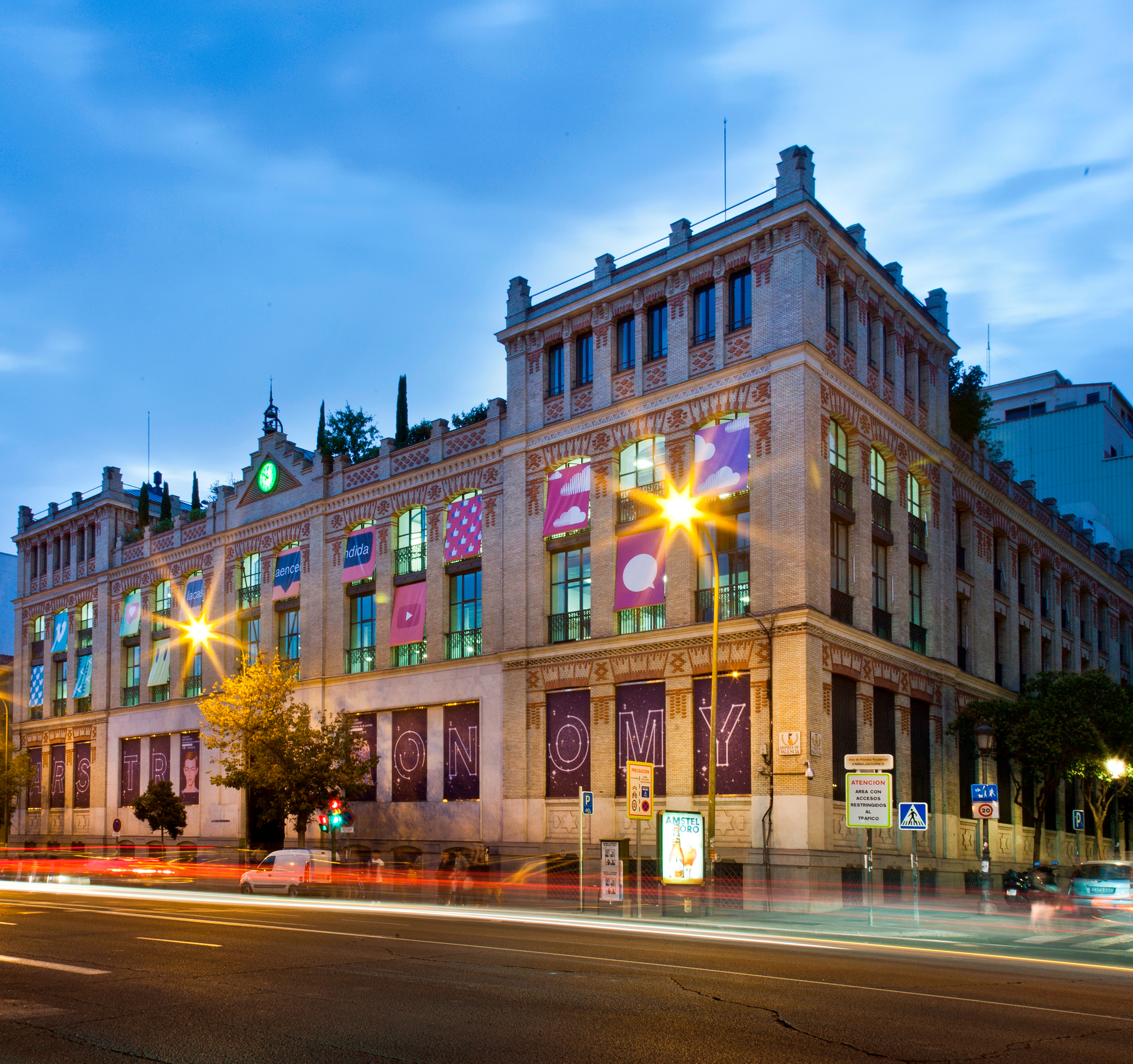
- Interactive map of the La Casa Encendida area

General information
- Location: Valencia Ring Road, 2, 28012, Spain
- Year built: 1911—1913

La Casa Encendida is a social and cultural centre in central Madrid (on the Ronda de Valencia where it is met by Calle Valencia). It began operations in December 2002.

It belongs to the Fundación Montemadrid (the formal title of which is Fundación Obra Social y Monte de Piedad de Madrid), a social responsibility entity set up by the Spanish bank Caja Madrid.

Among its activities are avant-garde art exhibitions, and running courses and workshops on social matters, culture and the environment. The cultural programme includes performance art, film, exhibitions and other forms of contemporary creativity. It developed as a place which particularly supports young artists.

The name La Casa Encendida ('The Burning House' in English) is taken from the eponymous book of the poet Luis Rosales Camacho, whose heirs gave their permission for its use.

== History and construction of the building ==
It was designed by the architect Fernando Arbós y Tremanti and the first stone was laid on 1 May 1911.

In its early years the building was used as the office of the bank Caja de Ahorros y Monte de Piedad de Madrid (the formal name of Caja Madrid). It was known as El Monte ('The Mount') and also as La Casa de Empeños ('The Pawnshop') because the Monte de Piedad ('Mount of Piety') in Spain had been an institutional pawnbroker run as a charity (i.e. no interest was charged on its loans) until its merger with Caja de Ahorros de Madrid ('Savings Bank of Madrid') in 1869.

The building is organized around a central courtyard. Its symmetrical facade is aesthetically novel when compared with other banking buildings of the period. The facade blends brick and granite using a mixture of Italianate and Neo-Mudéjar styles.

== Gallery ==
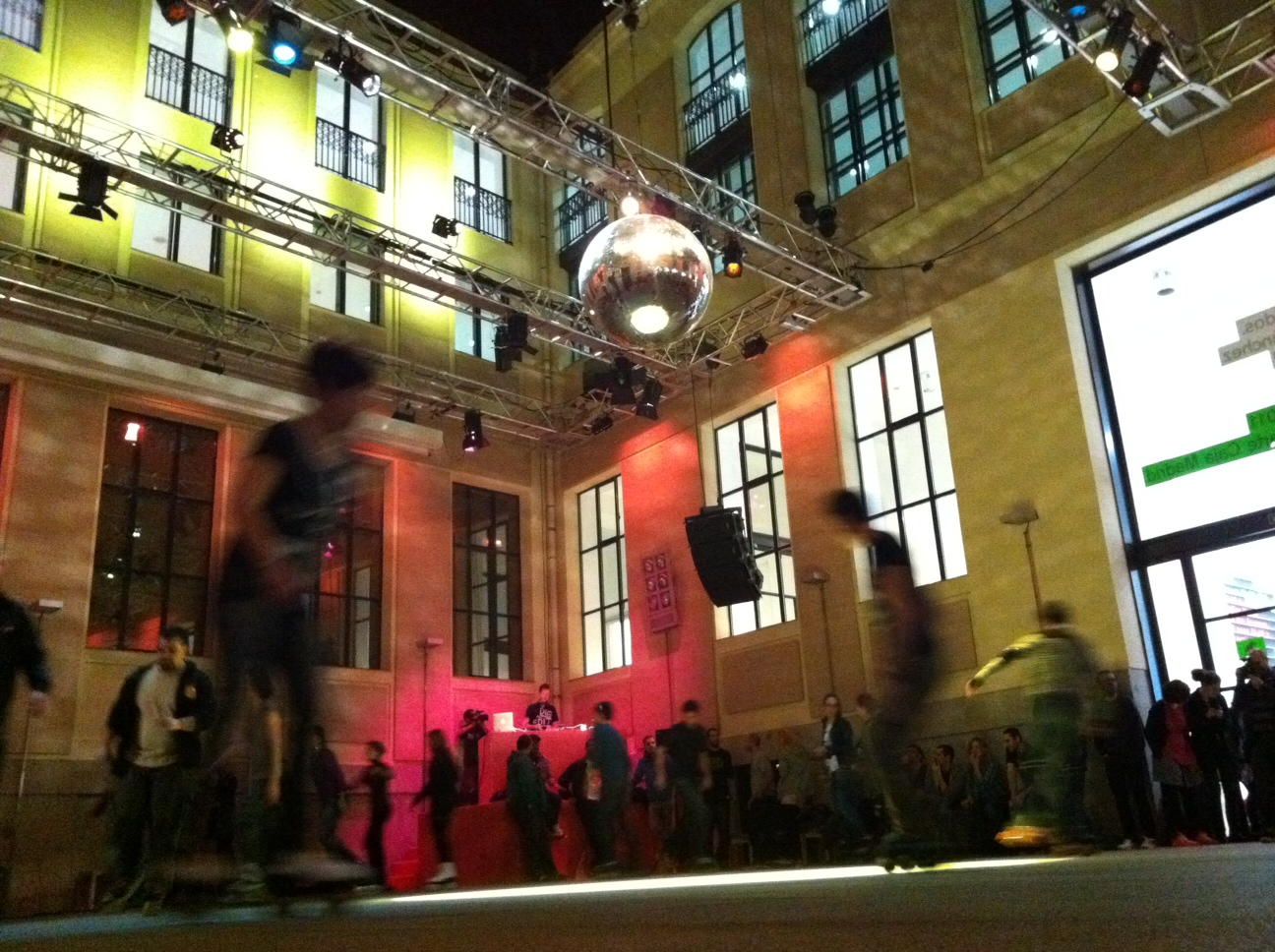
A roller disco-themed event, 2011

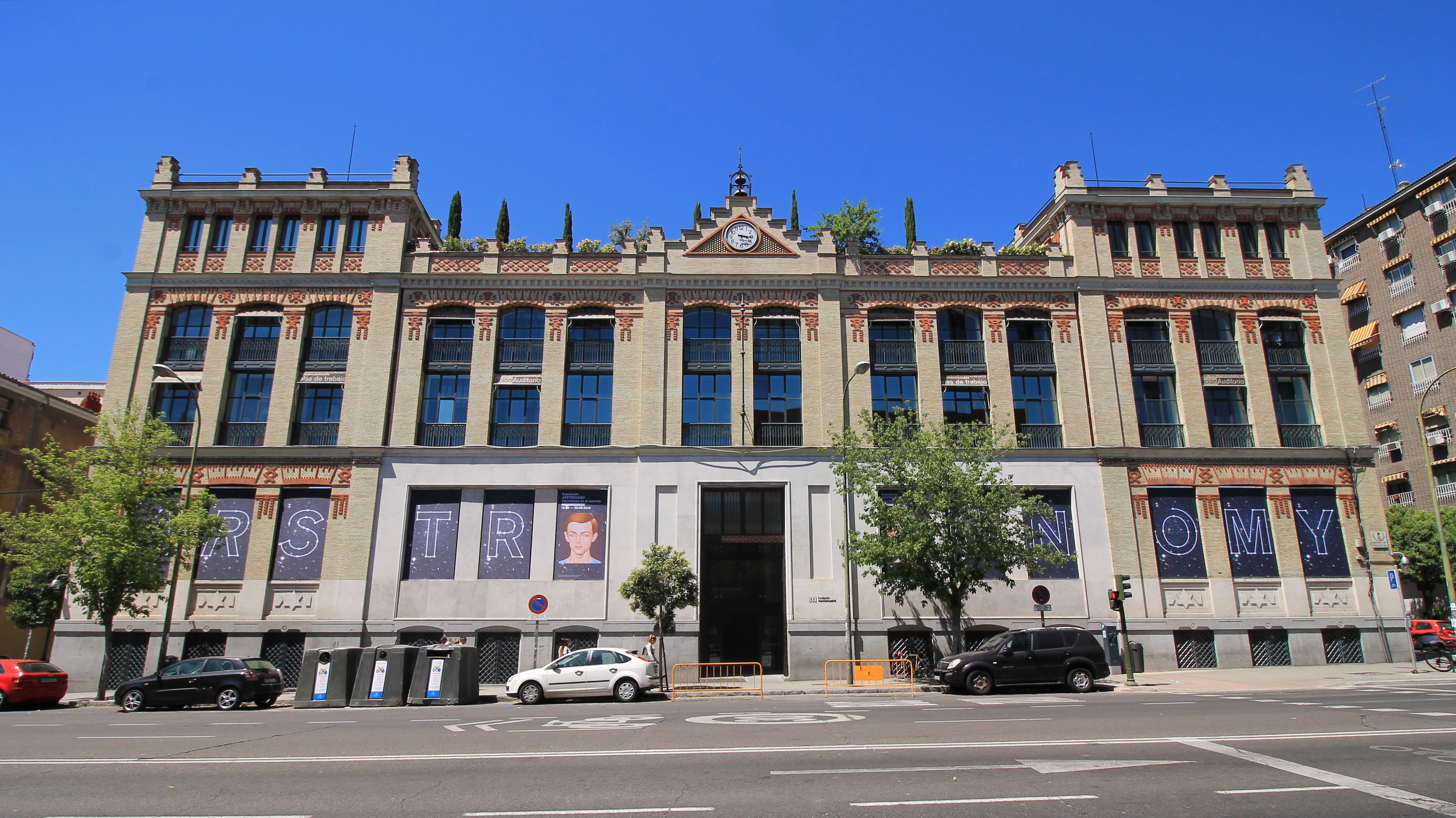
The façade, pictured in 2015

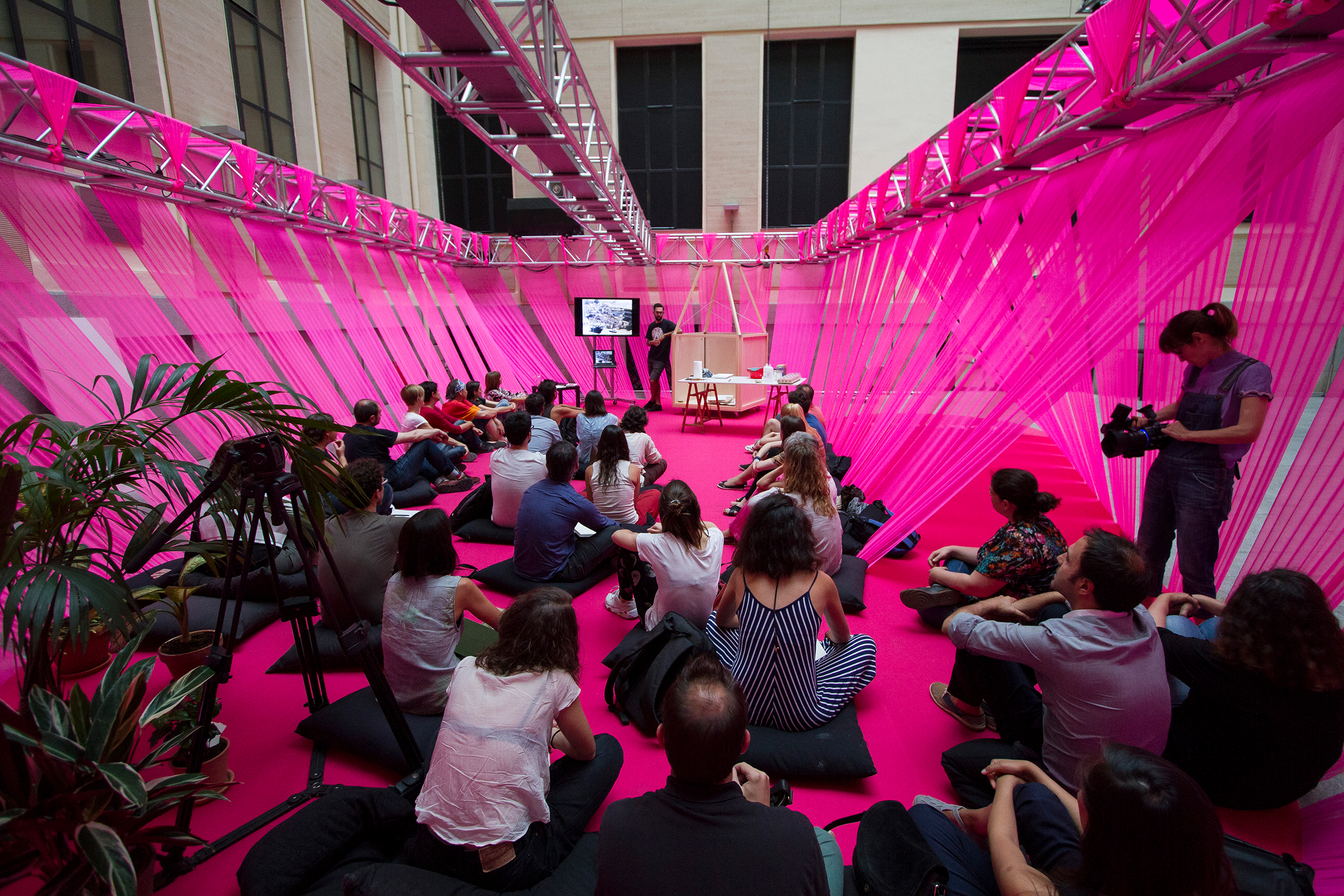
A 2019 journalism event at La Casa

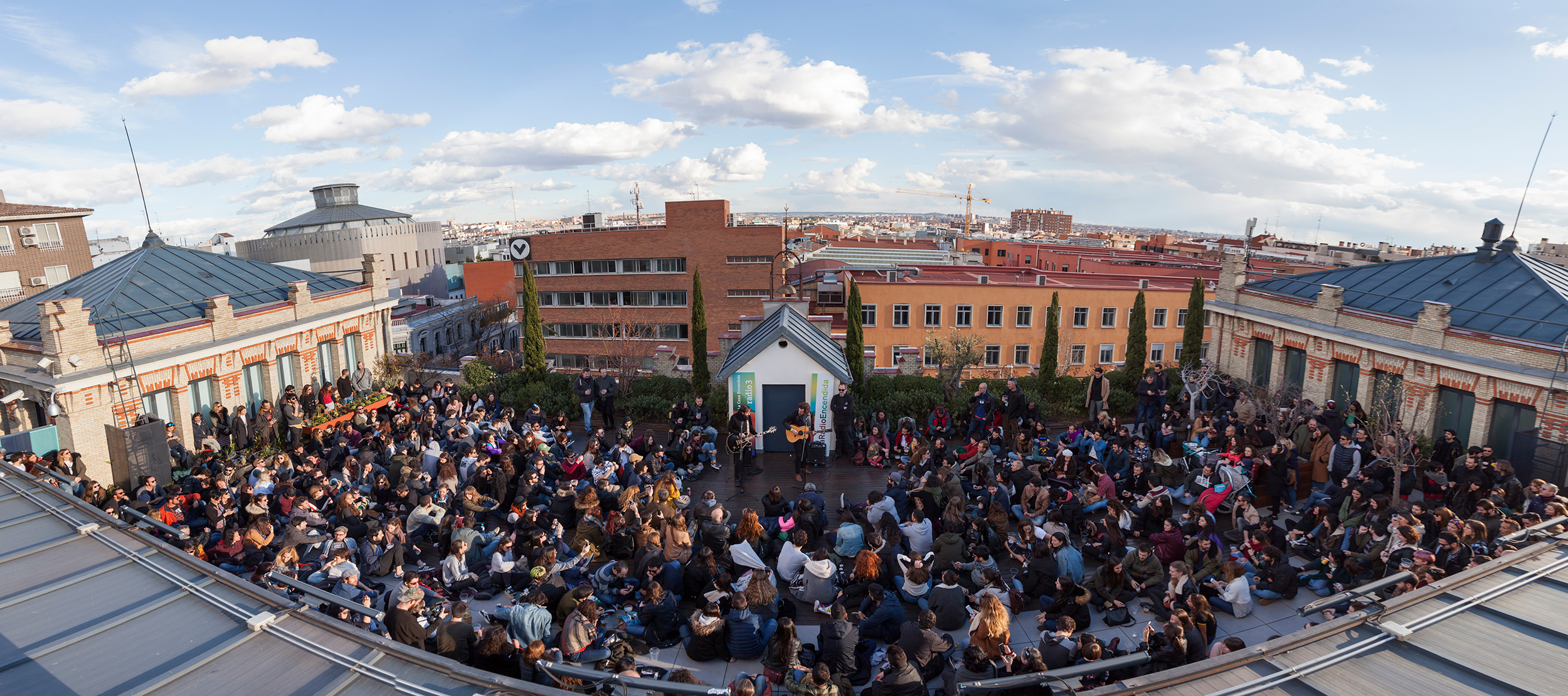
The Terrace, photographed in 2019

== Links ==
- Official La Casa Encendida website—(in Spanish)
- Fundación Montemadrid website—(in Spanish)
