= Gangbé! =

2015 Beninese musical documentary film

- Directed by: Arnaud Robert
- Written by: Arnaud Robert
- Based on: Gangbé Brass Band
- Produced by: Aline Schmid
- Cinematography: Charlie Petersmann
- Edited by: Nicolas Hislaire
- Production company: Intermezzo Films S.A.
- Release date: April 2015 (Visions du Reel)
- Running time: 58 minutes
- Countries: Benin; Switzerland; Nigeria
- Language: French

Gangbé! is a 2018 Beninese musical documentary film directed by Arnaud Robert and produced by Aline Schmid for Intermezzo Films.

The film is based on the journey of Gangbé Brass Band, a 10-member Beninese musical band known for their prowess in West African jùjú and traditional Vodou music, fused with Western jazz and big-band sounds. The band travels to Lagos to perform with Femi Kuti at the Shrine. The film received critical acclaim from reviewers.
