= Pascal Abikanlou =

- Born: 1936
- Died: 2009 (aged 72–73)
- Occupations: film maker, director and producer
- Notable work: Sous le signe du vaudou

Pascal Abikanlou (1936? – 2009) was a Beninese film maker, director and producer. He is considered the "father of Beninese cinema".

== Biography ==
Pascal Abikanlou was born in Pobe, a locality close to the border with Nigeria. Abikanlou is of Nago-Yoruba origin and comes from a royal lineage of Pobe. His father was sentenced to four years in prison by the French colonial authorities for defending a possible attachment of Pobe to Nigeria. He was educated at Maurice Delafosse High School in Dakar and was an industrial designer by training. He trained as a photographer by correspondence, then became a reporter and assistant cameraman and finally a director.

== Career ==
He directed the first feature movie Under the sign of Vaudoun in 1974.

== Filmography ==
- Under the sign of voodoo 1974
- Ganvié, my village 1967
- Stopover at Dahomey 1968
- First offerings 1969
- The Yam Festival 1969
- Operation Sonader 1971
- Water and shade 1971
- Africa at the rendezvous of the holy year 1975
- Sous le signe du vaudou 1976
- The Wind of Hope 1992
- Ouidah 92 1993
- Danhome Kingdom of Huegbadjavi 1989
