= Indochine, sur les traces d'une mère =

Indochine, sur les traces d’une mère
- Directed by: Idrissou Mora-Kpai
- Screenplay by: Idrissou Mora-Kpai
- Produced by: Jeanette Jouili Idrissou Mora-Kpai
- Cinematography: Jacques Besse
- Edited by: Rodolphe Molla Agnès Contensou
- Music by: Wasis Diop
- Release date: 2011
- Running time: 71 minutes
- Countries: Benin; France

Indochine, sur les traces d’une mère (English: Indochina, Traces of a Mother) is a 2011 documentary film.

== Synopsis ==
Between 1946 and 1954, more than 60,000 African soldiers were sent to the Far East to fight against the Viet Minh. Many unions between Vietnamese women and African soldiers took place, and children were born. Some stayed with their mothers, but others were taken back to Africa. Through the story of Christophe, a 58-year-old Afro-Asian, Idrissou Mora-Kpai not only tells the story of these children of mixed heritage, but also the unnatural fight in which colonized Africans stood against the Vietnamese who were fighting for their independence.

== Awards ==
- Fespaco 2011
