= List of shipwrecks in January 1827 =

The list of shipwrecks in January 1827 includes some ships sunk, wrecked or otherwise lost during January 1827.

== 1 January ==
List of shipwrecks: 1 January 1827
Ship	State	Description
Liverpool	United Kingdom	The ship was destroyed by fire at Cork.
Rose	United Kingdom	The sloop sprang a leak in the Moray Firth. She was beached in the early hours of 2 January near Fraserburgh, Aberdeenshire, where she was subsequently wrecked. All fourteen people on board were rescued by rocket apparatus.

== 3 January ==
List of shipwrecks: 3 January 1827
Ship	State	Description
Alexander	United Kingdom	The ship struck the Robin Rigg in the Irish Sea and foundered. Her crew were rescued. She was on a voyage from Maryport, Cumberland to Dumfries.

== 4 January ==
List of shipwrecks: 4 January 1827
Ship	State	Description
Countess of Mansfield	United Kingdom	The ship foundered in the Irish Sea. Her crew survived. She was on a voyage from Whitehaven, Cumberland to Annan, Dumfriesshire.
Mary	United Kingdom	The ship was driven ashore in Llandudno Bay. She was on a voyage from Liverpool, Lancashire to Amlwch, Anglesey.

== 5 January ==
List of shipwrecks: 5 January 1827
Ship	State	Description
Essex	United Kingdom	The brig foundered in the English Channel off The Lizard, Cornwall. Her crew were rescued by Astrea (United Kingdom). She was on a voyage from Dublin to London.

== 7 January ==
List of shipwrecks: 7 January 1827
Ship	State	Description
Britannia	United Kingdom	The ship was wrecked on Horn Island. She was on a voyage from Liverpool, Lancashire to Mobile, Alabama, United States.

== 8 January ==
List of shipwrecks: 8 January 1827
Ship	State	Description
Ossian	United Kingdom	The ship was severely damaged by fire at North Shields, County Durham.
Speedy	United Kingdom	The schooner was driven on to rocks at Berwick-upon-Tweed, Northumberland. Her two crew survived. The vessel refloated the next day and drifted out to sea.

== 9 January ==
List of shipwrecks: 9 January 1827
Ship	State	Description
Marshal Blücher	Prussia	The ship was wrecked at Brielle, South Holland, Netherlands.

== 10 January ==
List of shipwrecks: 10 January 1827
Ship	State	Description
Mary	United Kingdom	The ship was driven ashore and wrecked in the Bay of Bulls. All on board were rescued. She was on a voyage from Newfoundland, British North America to Newry, County Antrim.

== 11 January ==
List of shipwrecks: 11 January 1827
Ship	State	Description
Courier	United Kingdom	The ship was driven ashore in Bootle Bay. She was on a voyage from New York, United States to Liverpool, Lancashire.

== 12 January ==
List of shipwrecks: 12 January 1827
Ship	State	Description
Volentia	Kingdom of Hanover	The ship sprang a leak and was abandoned in the North Sea. Her crew were rescued by Baltic (United Kingdom).

== 13 January ==
List of shipwrecks: 13 January 1827
Ship	State	Description
HMS Nimrod	Royal Navy	The Cruizer-class brig-sloop was driven ashore and wrecked at Holyhead, Wales, during a gale. Her 121 crew were rescued. The steamer Harlequin (United Kingdom) pulled her off the rocks on 12 February, but the Royal Navy deemed her not worth repairing and sold her into mercantile service on 22 February.
Rose	United Kingdom	The schooner was driven ashore at Holywood, County Down.

== 14 January ==
List of shipwrecks: 14 January 1827
Ship	State	Description
Aid	United Kingdom	The ship was wrecked on Stotfield Head, Morayshire with the loss of all hands.
Aid	United Kingdom	The ship was wrecked on the Dick Sand, in the North Sea off Cuxhaven. Her crew were rescued. She was on a voyage from Liverpool, Lancashire to Hamburg.
Brothers	United Kingdom	The ship was driven on to the West Hoyle Bank, in Liverpool Bay. She was on a voyage from Livorno, Kingdom of Sardinia to Liverpool. Brothers was later refloated and taken in to Hoylake, Lancashire.
Cedric	United Kingdom	The ship foundered in the Irish Sea off Holyhead, Anglesey. She was on a voyage from Great Yarmouth, Norfolk to Liverpool
Eris Mahony	United Kingdom	The ship was driven ashore in Cardigan Bay. She was on a voyage from Cork to Dublin.
Fanny	United Kingdom	The schooner was driven ashore at Liverpool.
Friends	United Kingdom	The sloop was driven ashore crewless at Formby, Lancashire. She was on a voyage from Killough, County Down to Liverpool.
Globe	United States	The ship was driven ashore at Liverpool. She was on a voyage from Savannah, Georgia to Liverpool.
Henry	United Kingdom	The brig was driven ashore near Nairn, Inverness-shire. Her crew were rescued.
Hoop	Netherlands	The ship was driven ashore at Callantsoog, North Holland. She was on a voyage from Harlingen, Friesland to London, United Kingdom.
John and Mary	United Kingdom	The ship was driven ashore and wrecked at Whitehaven, Cumberland. Her crew were rescued.
Leonora	United Kingdom	The ship was driven ashore and wrecked at Troon, Ayrshire. Her twenty crew were rescued. She was on a voyage from Demerara to Greenock, Renfrewshire.
Marion and Ann	United Kingdom	The schooner was driven ashore at Garmouth, Morayshire. Her crew survived.
Mary	United Kingdom	The ship was driven ashore at Liverpool. She was on a voyage from Workington, Cumberland to Liverpool.
Nancy	United Kingdom	The ship was driven ashore in Cardigan Bay. She was on a voyage from Newfoundland, British North America to Liverpool.
Oylestrope	United States	The ship was driven ashore at Rock Ferry, Cheshire, United Kingdom. She was on a voyage from Savannah to Liverpool.
Panthea	United States	The ship was driven ashore and wrecked at Holyhead. All on board were rescued. She was on a voyage from New York, United States to Liverpool
Perseverance	United Kingdom	The ship was wrecked near Sunderland, County Durham. She was on a voyage from Gainsborough, Lincolnshire to Newcastle upon Tyne, Northumberland.
Rivals	United Kingdom	The ship was driven on to the Herd Sand, in the North Sea off North Shields, County Durham and sank. Her crew were rescued by the North Shields Lifeboat. She was on a voyage from Cardiff, Glamorgan to Aberdeen.
Rover	United Kingdom	The ship was driven ashore and wrecked at Winterton-on-Sea, Norfolk.
Samuel Robertson	United States	The ship was driven ashore and wrecked at Ardmore, Barra, United Kingdom. She was on a voyage from Charleston, South Carolina to the Clyde.
HNLMS Scheldt	Netherlands Navy	Java War: The troopship was driven ashore and wrecked at Terneuzen, Zeeland.
Vertumnus	United Kingdom	The brig was driven ashore near Nairn. Her crew were rescued.
HNLMS Wassenaar	Netherlands Navy	Java War: The 74-gun Boree-class ship-of-the-line was driven ashore and wrecked at Egmond aan Zee, North Holland. Of the 1,300 people on board, there were 22 survivors.
Westbury	United Kingdom	The ship was driven ashore at Liverpool. She was on a voyage from St. Andrew, New Brunswick British North America to Liverpool.

== 15 January ==
List of shipwrecks: 15 January 1827
Ship	State	Description
Baron Ardrossan	United Kingdom	The Collier was driven ashore at Whitehaven, Cumberland.
Dædalus	United Kingdom	The ship was driven ashore at Whitstable, Kent. She was on a voyage from Saint John, New Brunswick, British North America to London.
Eagle	United Kingdom	The ship was driven ashore at Whitstable. She was on a voyage from Berbice to London.
Glory	(United Kingdom of Great Britain and Ireland) New South Wales	The brig was wrecked on Pitt Island, in New Zealand's Chatham Islands, driven on shore as a result of an anchor dragging and then beached and wrecked by the heavy swell. Her crew were rescued.
Jane and Mary	United Kingdom	The collier was driven ashore and wrecked at Whitehaven. All on board were rescued.
Utility	United Kingdom	The collier was driven ashore at Whitehaven.

== 16 January ==
List of shipwrecks: 16 January 1827
Ship	State	Description
True Blue	United Kingdom	The ship was driven ashore and wrecked at Calais, France. She was on a voyage from London to Dunkerque, Nord, France.

== 17 January ==
List of shipwrecks: 17 January 1827
Ship	State	Description
Fareban	flag unknown	The ship was driven ashore and wrecked at Sunderland, County Durham, United Kingdom.

== 18 January ==
List of shipwrecks: 18 January 1827
Ship	State	Description
Hoop	Netherlands	The ship was driven ashore and wrecked on the west coast of Texel, North Holland. She was on a voyage from Hull, Yorkshire, United Kingdom to Rotterdam, South Holland.
Mandarin	United States	The ship was driven ashore and wrecked at Huisduinen, North Holland, Netherlands. Her crew survived. She was on a voyage from Baltimore, Maryland to Amsterdam, North Holland.

== 20 January ==
List of shipwrecks: 20 January 1827
Ship	State	Description
Dart	United Kingdom	The ship was wrecked on the Haisborough Sands, in the North Sea off the coast of Norfolk. Her crew survived. She was on a voyage from Sunderland, County Durham to London.
George	India	The barque was wrecked on "Catapalam Point".

== 21 January ==
List of shipwrecks: 21 January 1827
Ship	State	Description
Jeune Augustine	France	The ship foundered in the Atlantic Ocean off Land's End, Cornwall, United Kingdom. Her crew were rescued by Perseverance (United Kingdom). She was on a voyage from Bordeaux, Gironde to Bristol, Gloucestershire, United Kingdom.

== 25 January ==
List of shipwrecks: 25 January 1827
Ship	State	Description
Jonge Frau Maria	Denmark	The ship sprang a leak and was abandoned in the North Sea. She was on a voyage from Hull, Yorkshire to Før.
Mary and Elizabeth	(United Kingdom of Great Britain and Ireland) Grenada	The ship was wrecked in St George's Bay, Trinidad.

== 26 January ==
List of shipwrecks: 26 January 1827
Ship	State	Description
Eliza	United Kingdom	The ship was driven ashore near Great Yarmouth, Norfolk. She was on a voyage from Kiel to Bristol, Gloucestershire.

== 27 January ==
List of shipwrecks: 27 January 1827
Ship	State	Description
Ferguson	United Kingdom	The ship was driven ashore and wrecked between Dover and Folkestone, Kent. She was on a voyage from Havre de Grâce, Seine-Inférieure, France to London.

== 28 January ==
List of shipwrecks: 28 January 1827
Ship	State	Description
Earl Belmore	United Kingdom	The ship was driven ashore in Carnarvon Bay. She was on a voyage from St. Andrew, New Brunswick, British North America to Liverpool, Lancashire.

== Unknown date ==
List of shipwrecks: Unknown date 1827
Ship	State	Description
Caledonia	(United Kingdom of Great Britain and Ireland) British North America	The ship was wrecked on the coast of Newfoundland before 19 January. Her crew were rescued. She was on a voyage from Liverpool, Lancashire, United Kingdom to St. John's, Newfoundland
Florida	United States	The ship was driven ashore and wrecked between "Port de Grave" and Verdun, Meuse, France in mid-January.
Goole	United Kingdom	The brig was wrecked on the East Barrowes Sand, in the North Sea off the coast of Essex.
Heistelde	Netherlands	The ship was wrecked on the Dutch coast. She was on a voyage from Hull, Yorkshire, United Kingdom to Amsterdam, North Holland.
Hope	United Kingdom	The sloop sank in the River Medway off Queenborough, Kent.
Lady Hunter	United Kingdom	The ship was driven ashore at the Point of Ayr, Flintshire.
Lady Mackenzie	United Kingdom	The ship was driven ashore at Stranraer, Wigtownshire.
