= Pantheon of Illustrious Men =

National mausoleum of Spain

- Panteón de Hombres Ilustres
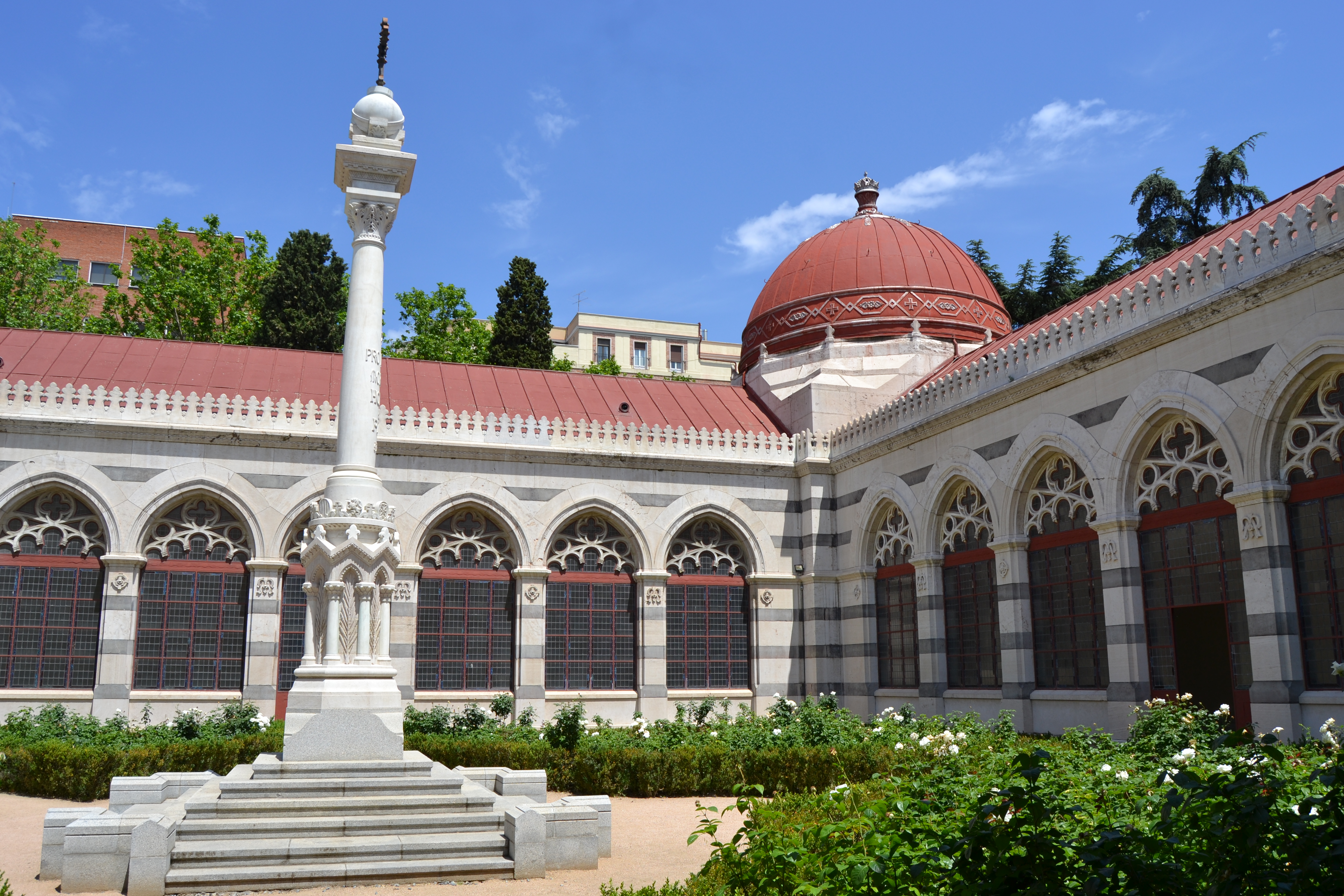
- Interactive map of the Pantheon of Illustrious Men area

General information
- Location: Madrid, Spain
- Owner: Patrimonio Nacional

Spanish Cultural Heritage
- Official name: Panteón de Hombres Ilustres
- Type: Non-movable
- Criteria: Monument
- Designated: 1992
- Reference no.: RI-51-0007311

The Pantheon of Illustrious Men (Spanish: Panteón de Hombres Ilustres), known since 2022 as Pantheon of Spain (Spanish: Panteón de España), is a royal site in Madrid and the national mausoleum of Spain. It houses numerous significant deceased Spanish dignitaries, artists, politicians, and thinkers, and is administered and managed by Patrimonio Nacional. It was designed by Spanish architect Fernando Arbós y Tremanti, and is located in Basilica of Nuestra Señora de Atocha in the Retiro section of Madrid. The Panteón is designated as a Location of Democratic Memory, signifying its significance to Spanish national identity.

== History ==
The current building received its first interned remains in 1901 after a seven-year construction, starting in 1892. The Dominican church to which the pantheon is attached began construction in 1924, though the complex as a whole was effectively abandoned until 1992, when it was renovated. These renovations finished in 2003, marking as well the first opening of the Pantheon to the general public.

== Notable interments ==
The pantheon houses the tombs of a number of famous Spaniards including:

- Leandro Fernández de Moratín (1760–1828), dramatist
- Francisco de Paula Martinez de la Rosa (1789–1862), prime minister
- Juan Álvarez Mendizábal (1790–1853), politician
- Antonio de los Ríos y Rosas (1812–1873), politician, whose tomb is designed by Pedro Estany
- Práxedes Mateo Sagasta (1825–1903), prime minister, whose tomb is the work of sculptor Mariano Benlliure
- Antonio Cánovas del Castillo (1828–1897), prime minister, by Catalan sculptor Agustí Querol Subirats
- Eduardo Dato e Iradier (1856–1921), prime minister, by sculptor Mariano Benlliure
- José Canalejas (1854–1912), prime minister, by sculptor Mariano Benlliure

== Notable structures ==
The site also contains its own version of the statue of Liberty, an 1857 tomb designed by sculptors Federico Aparici, Ponciano Ponzano and Sabino Medina, moved here in 1912.

== Gallery ==
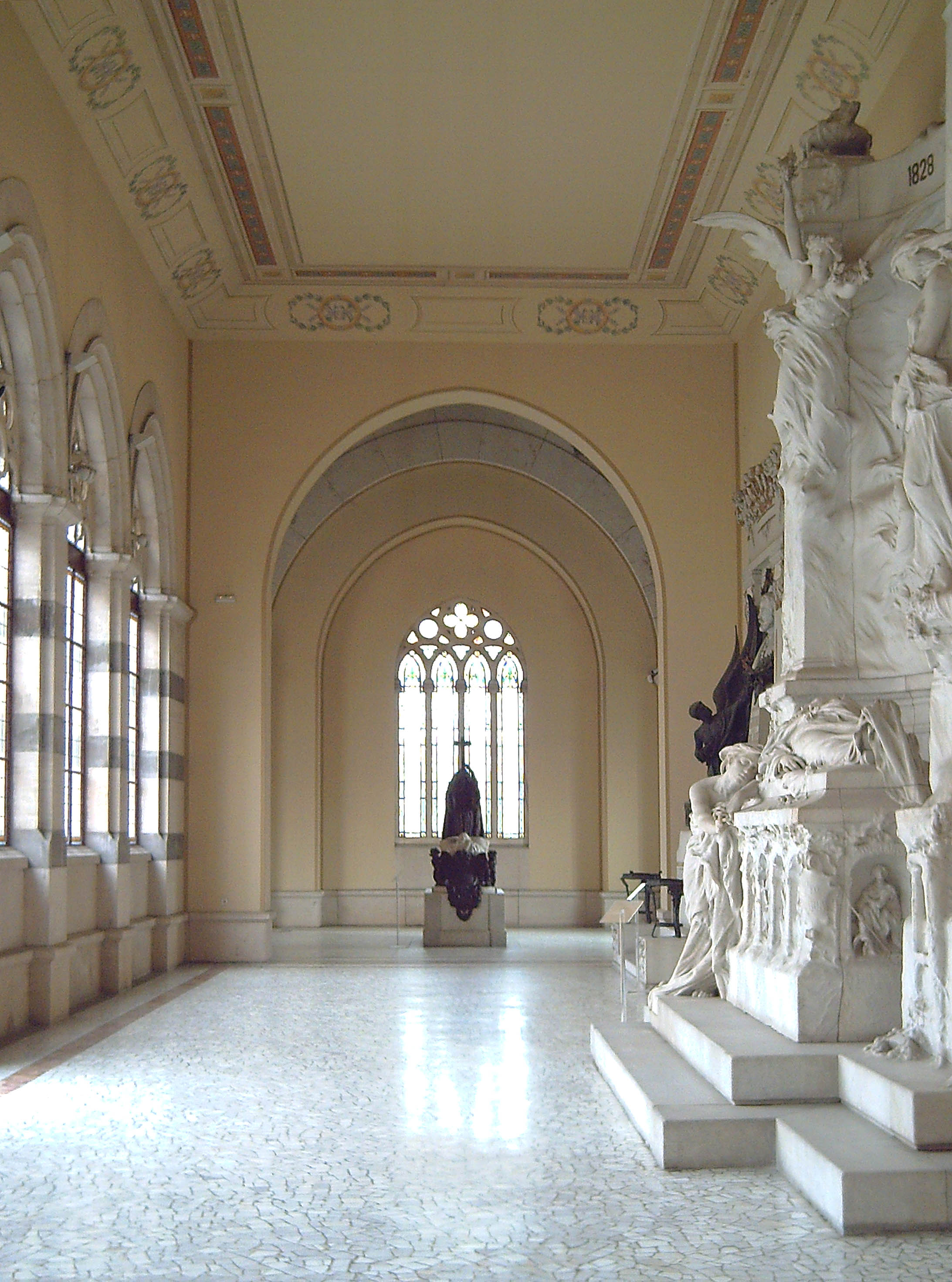
Interior of the Pantheon of Illustrious Men

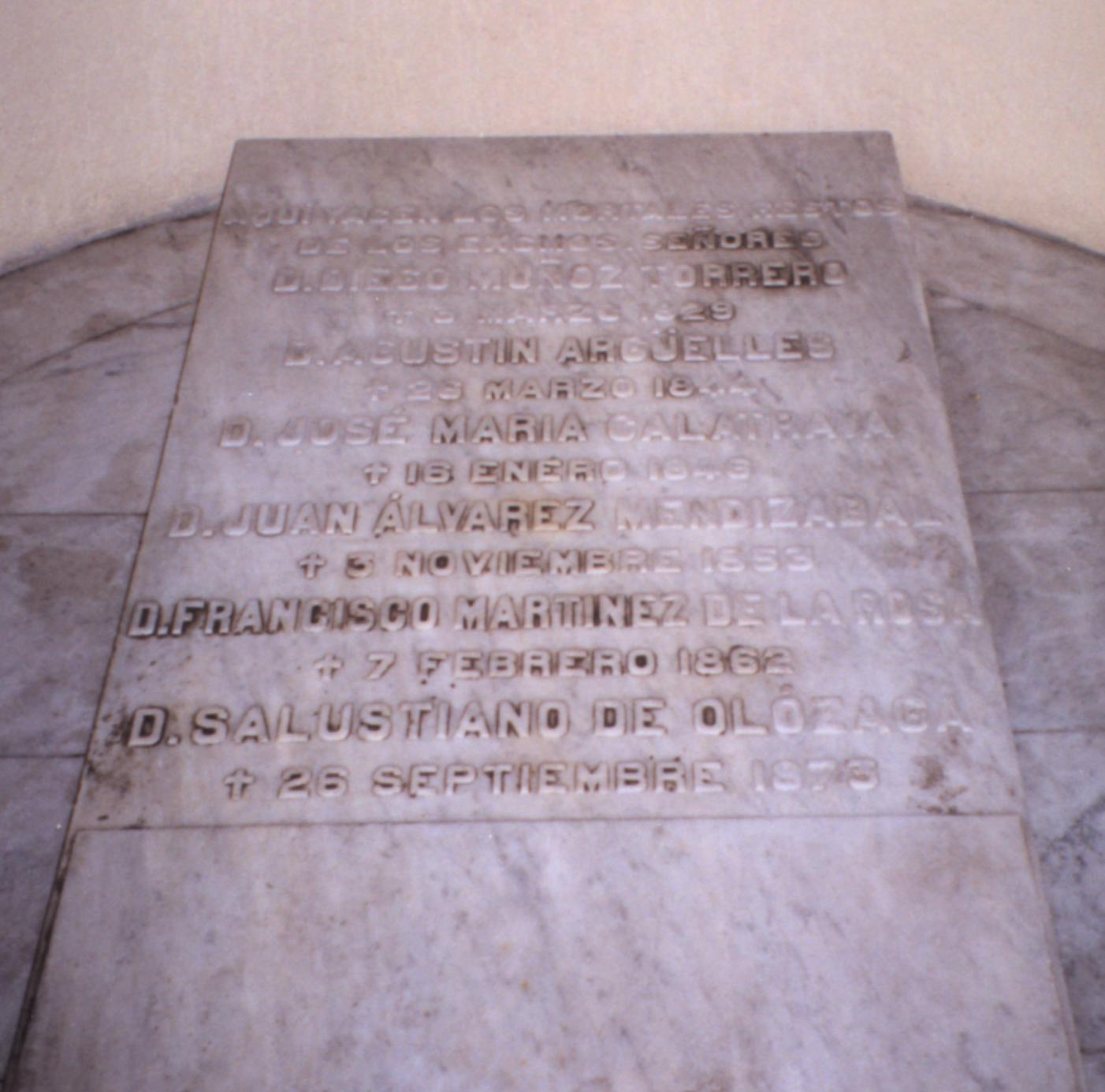
Tomb of six Spanish liberal politicians

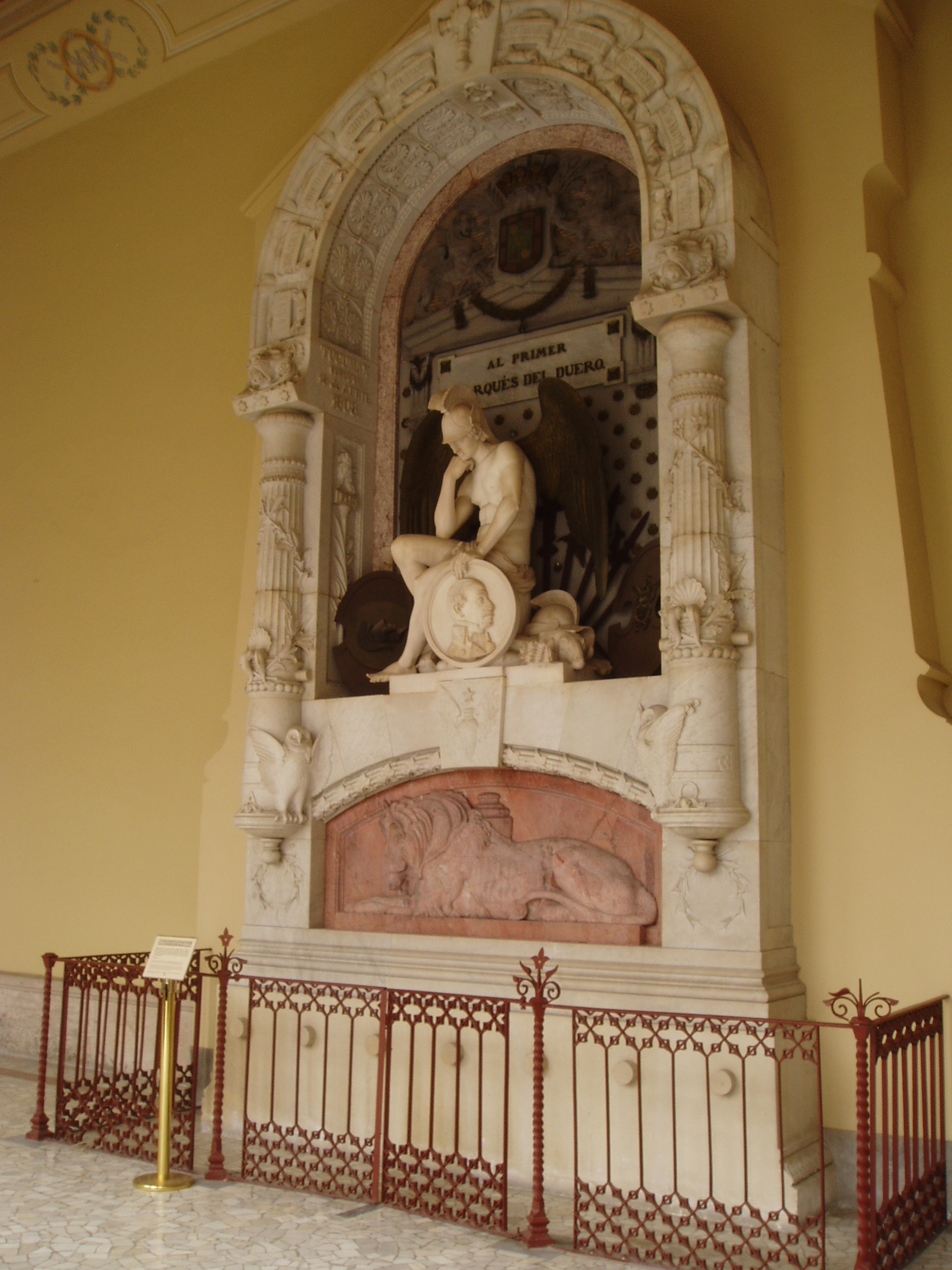
Tomb of the Marqués del Duero

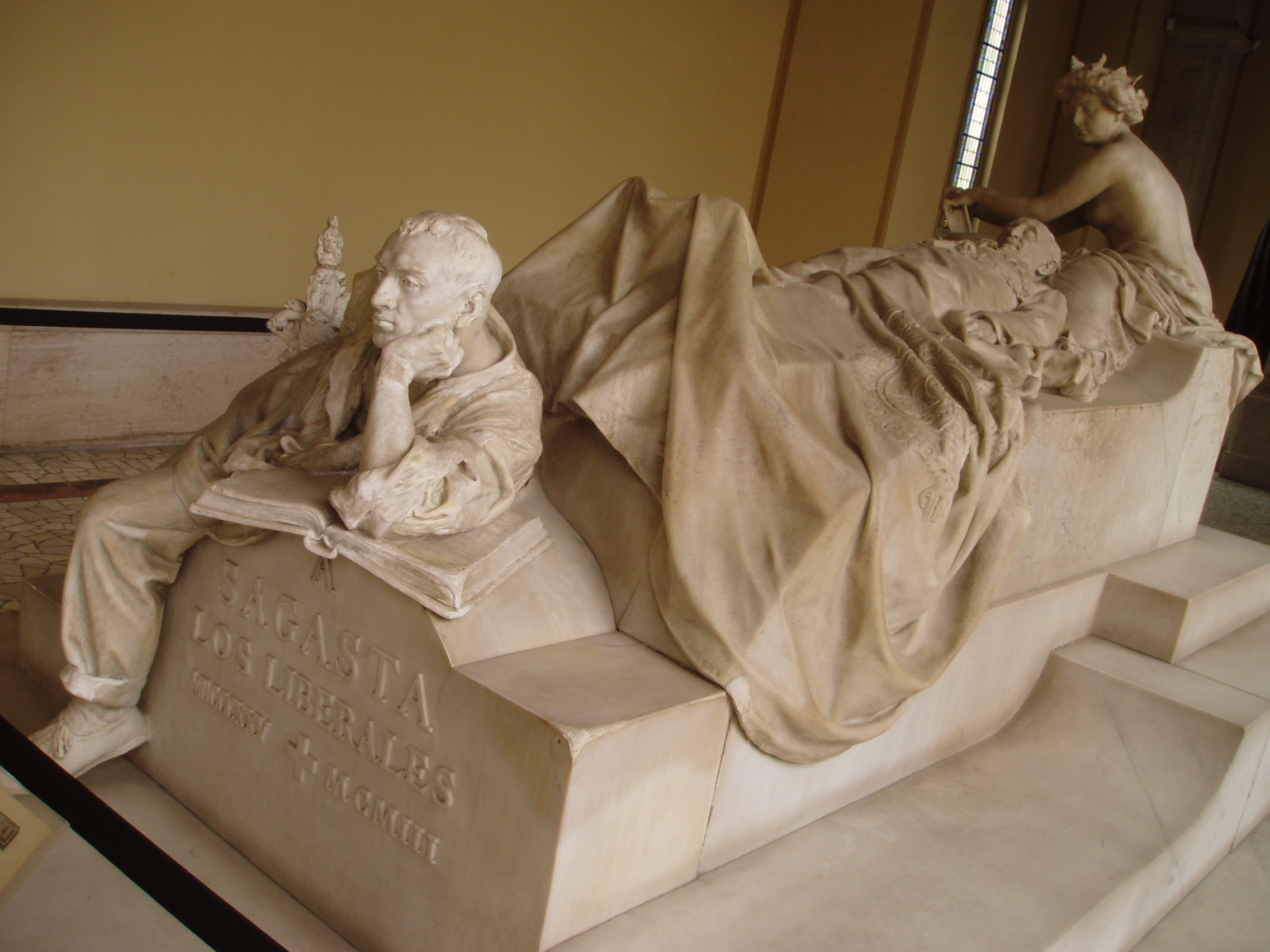
Tomb of Práxedes Mateo Sagasta

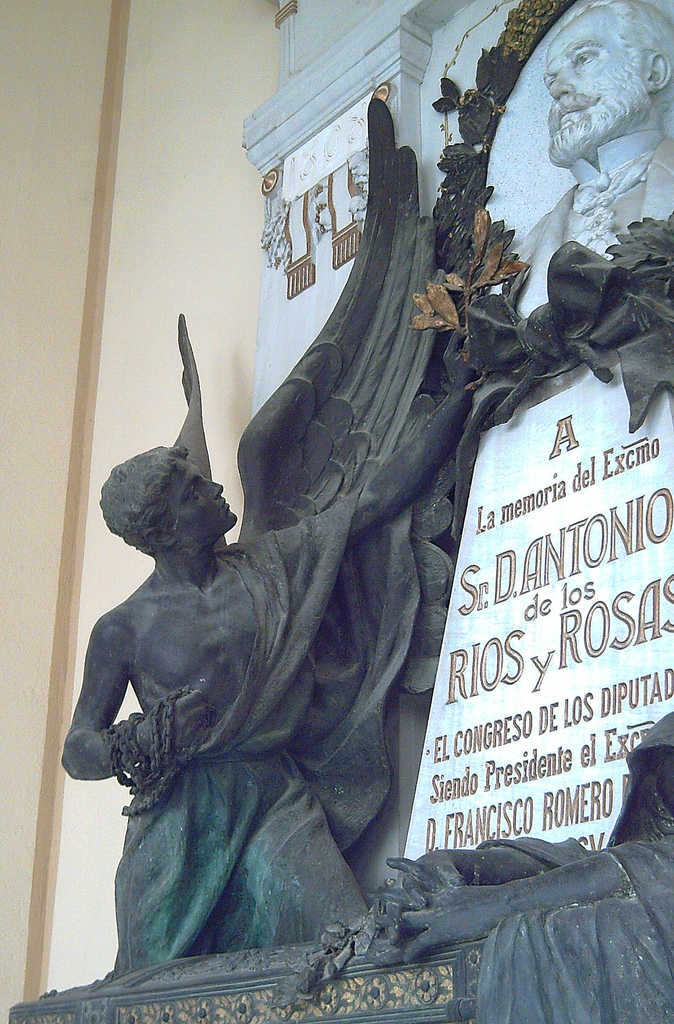
Tomb of Antonio de los Ríos y Rosas

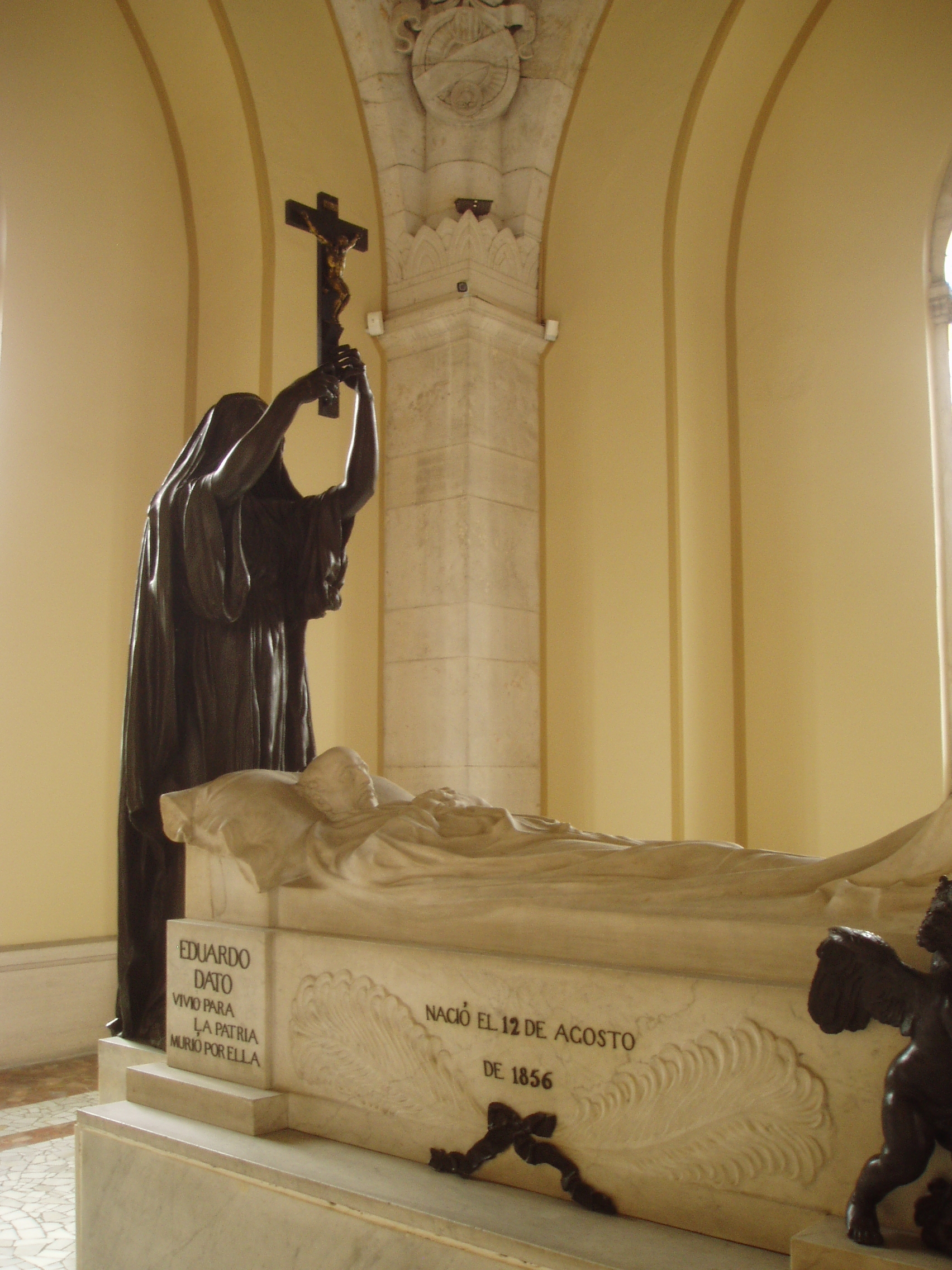
Tomb of Eduardo Dato

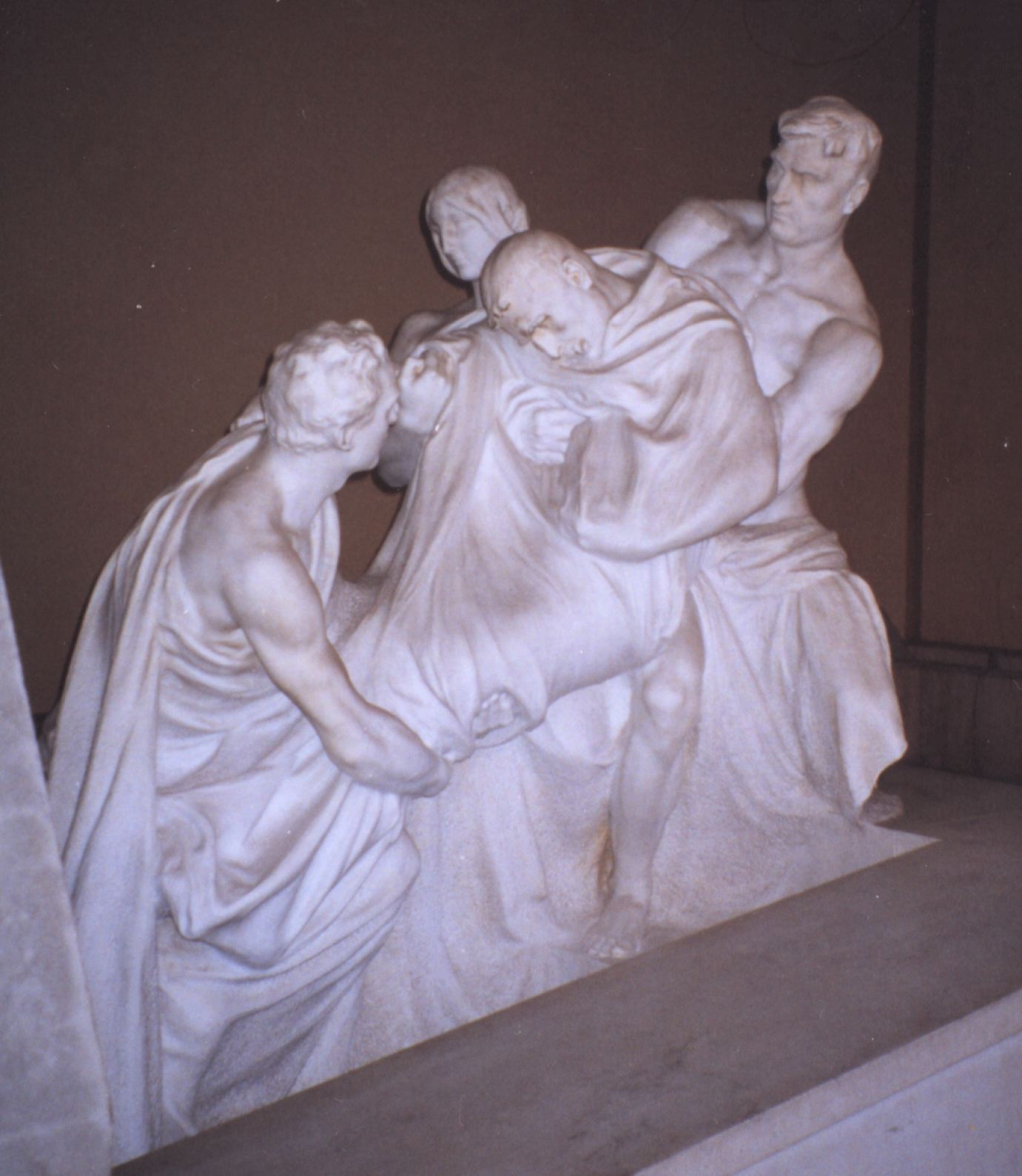
Tomb of José Canalejas

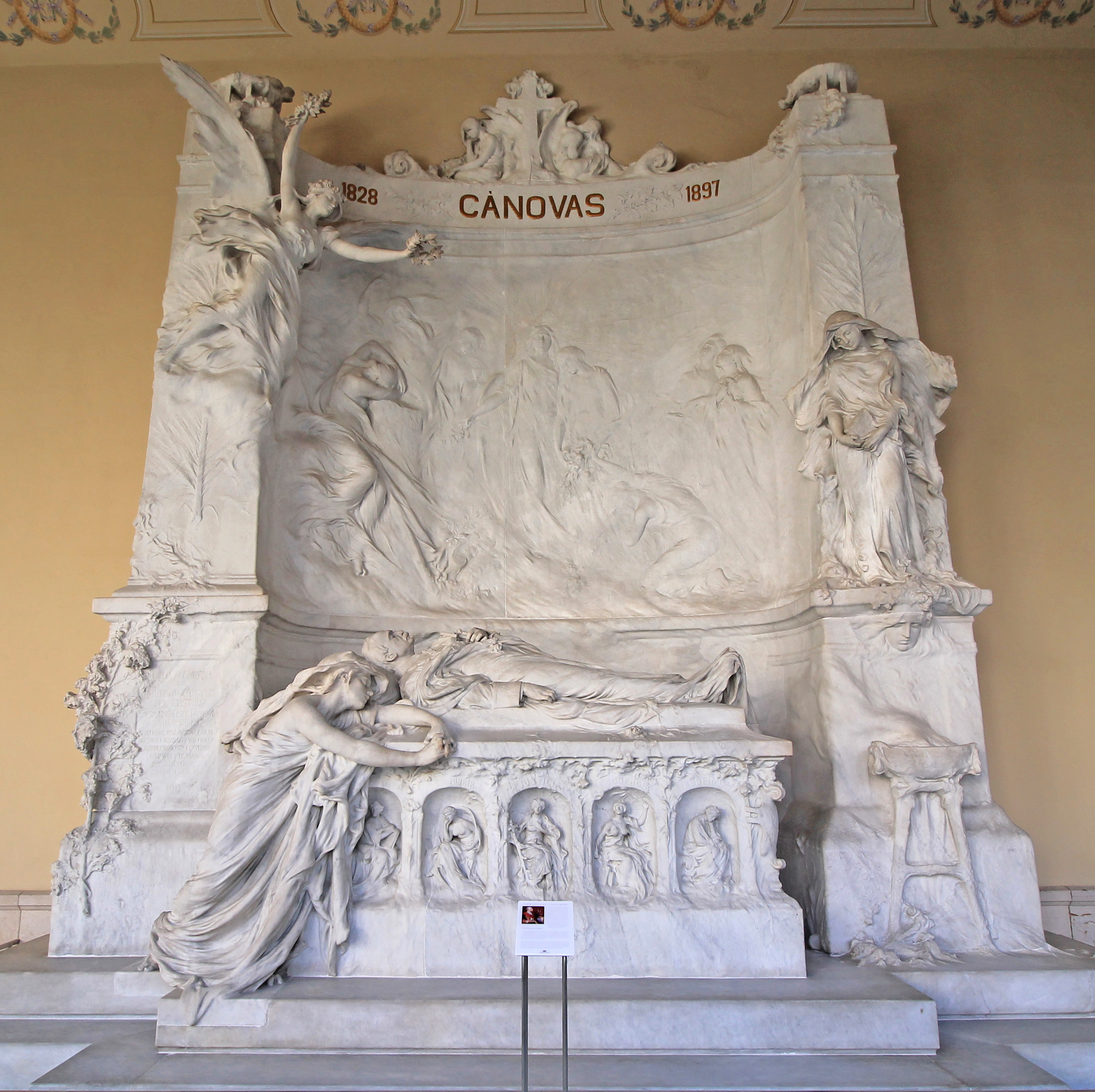
Tomb of Antonio Cánovas
