= Sous le signe du vaudou =

- Directed by: Pascal Abikanlou
- Produced by: Pascal Abikanlou (Abiscal Films)
- Edited by: Andrée Davanture
- Release date: 1976
- Country: Benin

Sous le signe du vaudou (English: 'Under the Sign of Vodoo') is a Beninese film directed by Pascal Abikanlou and released in 1974. It is the director's first feature film, as well as Benin's first fiction feature film. In color, it was shot in 16 mm, then expanded to 35 mm.

== Synopsis ==
A young man neglects the ritual offerings to the voodoo deities and invokes their anger. His family suffers the consequences: house burned, crops destroyed. He leaves for the city to try to help them, but finds himself caught up in drugs. He ends up meeting a young girl who encourages him to return to the village. They marry in the voodoo tradition and the curse is lifted.
