= Jean Odoutan =

Beninese actor, film director and film producer (born 1965)

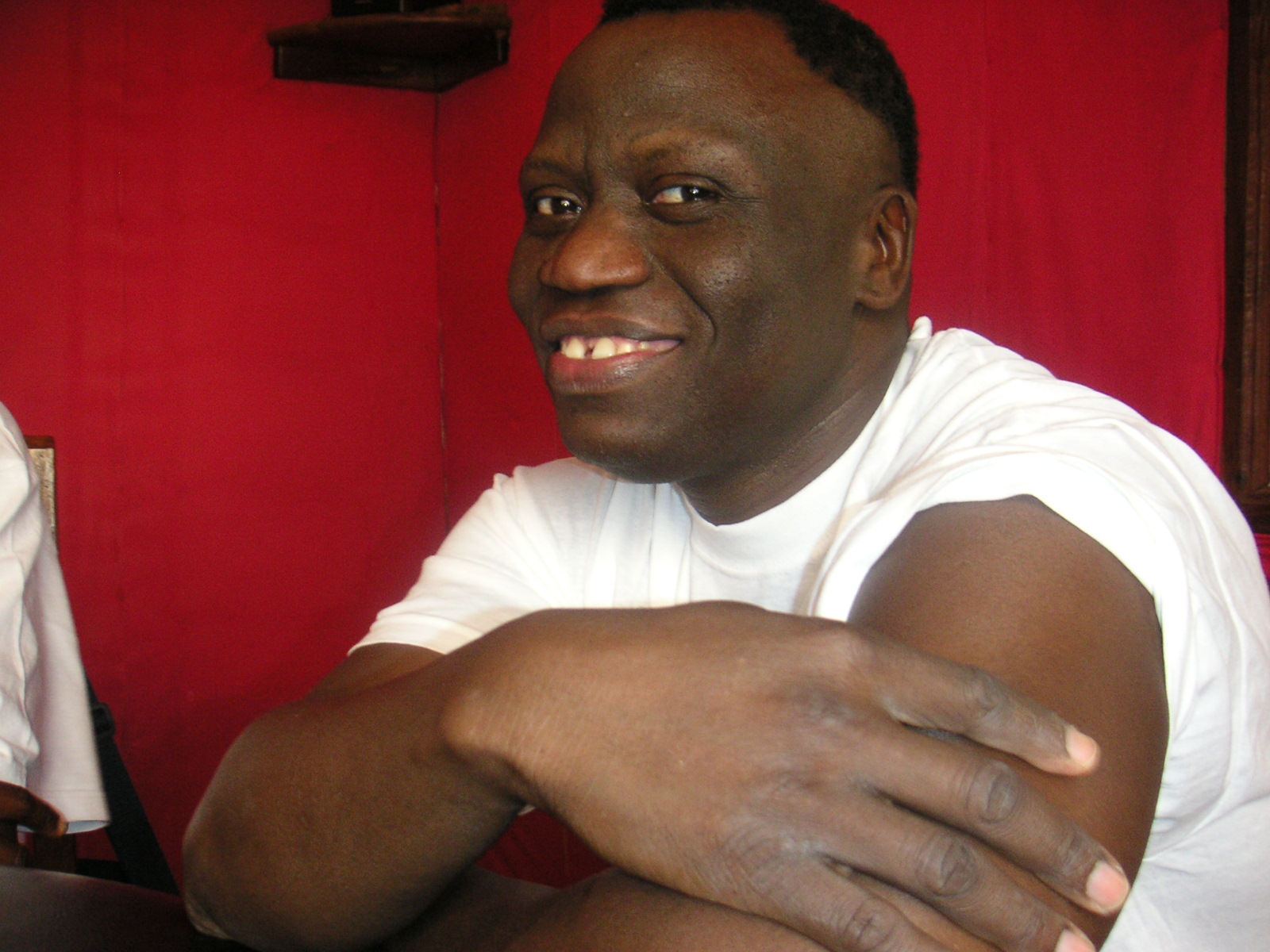
- Born: 1965 (age 60–61)
- Citizenship: Beninese
- Occupations: comedian, film director, composer, actor, screenwriter and executive movie producer
- Notable work: Barbecue Pejo

Jean Odoutan (born in 1965) is a comedian, film director, composer, actor, screenwriter and executive movie producer from the African country of Benin. He is also the creator of a film festival, the Quintessence International Film Festival of Ouidah.

== Early life ==
Odoutan moved to Paris, France as a teenager, at the age of fifteen in 1980. Soon after, he began working in the film industry.

== Filmography ==
Jean Odoutan has been involved in many films, either as actor, director or producer. Many of his movies have been critically acclaimed and he has been guest of honor at many film festivals, including the 2001 Reunion Film Festival. Among the movies he has participated in are:

- Barbecue Pejo (2000)
- Djib (2000, as director and screenwriter)
- La Valse des Gros Derrieres (2004, as director and screenwriter)
