= Filmfest Dresden =

Annual film festival held in Dresden, Germany

- Filmfest Dresden Logo
- Location: Dresden, Germany
- Founded: 1989
- Awards: Golden Horseman, special prizes
- Website: www.filmfest-dresden.de/en/

Filmfest Dresden (Dresden Film Festival) is an international short film festival since 1989 based in Dresden, Germany. The focus of the competition is on short feature films and animated films.

When the Filmfest Dresden was held for the first time before the fall of the Berlin Wall, it was used to present films that were previously banned or rarely shown in the GDR to the public. After the German reunification, the focus of the festival had to change. Since DEFA's animation studios were located in Dresden, the decision was made to use the concept of a short and animation festival.

The international competition of the festival has existed since 1992 and 1998, followed by the establishment of its own national competition, in which the €20,000 promotional prize of the Saxon State Minister for Culture and Tourism has been awarded since 2004. With a total of more than €67,000 in prize money, Filmfest Dresden is one of the best endowed short film festivals in Europe. The award for the best animated and feature films in the competitions is the Golden Horseman based on the equestrian statue in Dresden of the same name. Moreover, there are also audience awards, the Golden Horseman for best sound design, the LUCA Film Award for GenderEquality and the ARTE short film award.

In addition to the competitions, the festival week offers an extensive range of special programmes with thematic and country focuses, retrospectives and youth films. These include a series of focuses, which each year highlight a specific theme and explore it in several film programmes. In April 2019, for example, the key focus was dedicated to the current filmmaking in Cuba.

Since 2012, the section "etc. - events, trainings, connections" complements the cinematic offer with panel discussions, lectures, workshops, exhibitions and receptions and is aimed at both professionals and the interested public.
