= List of Tunisian actresses =

This is a list of notable Tunisian actresses. All actresses are arranged alphabetically on the basis of the first letter of their surname.

== A ==
- Dalenda Abdou
- Doria Achour
- Amina Annabi

== B ==
- Jalila Baccar
- Kawther El Bardi
- Najla Ben Abdallah
- Aïcha Ben Ahmed
- Souhir Ben Amara
- Maram Ben Aziza
- Mariem Ben Chaabane
- Meriam Ben Hussein
- Meriem Ben Mami
- Fatima Ben Saïdane
- Rim El Benna
- Dora Bouchoucha
- Rym Breidy

== C ==
- Claudia Cardinale
- Safia Chamia
- Saskia Cohen-Tanugi

== D ==
- Anissa Daoud
- Wahida Dridi

== F ==
- Agata Flori
- Kenza Fourati

== G ==
- Rania Gabsi
- Nidhal Guiga

== H ==
- Shayma Helali

== J ==
- Poorna Jagannathan
- Wajiha Jendoubi
- Naima El Jeni

== L ==
- Latifa (singer)

== M ==
- Samira Magroun
- Samar Matoussi
- Dalila Meftahi
- Sandra Milo
- Habiba Msika

== N ==
- Jouda Najah
- Mouna Noureddine

== O ==
- Oulaya

== R ==
- Samia Rhaiem
- Rim Riahi
- Chafia Rochdi
- Hassiba Rochdi

== S ==
- Hend Sabry

== Z ==
- Dorra Zarrouk
- Rim Zribi

== See also ==
- Mass media in Tunisia
