= Mariem =

Mariem is an Arabic variant of the Aramaic given name Maryam. It may refer to:

- Mariem Ben Chaabane (born 1983), Tunisian actress
- Mariem Hassan (1958–2015), Sahrawi singer and lyricist
- Mariem Homrani (born 1991), Tunisian boxer
- Mariem Houij (born 1994), Tunisian footballer
- Meriem Sassi (born 1991), Tunisian footballer
- Mariem Alaoui Selsouli (born 1984), Moroccan middle- and long-distance runner
- Mariem Velazco (born 1998), Venezuelan model and beauty queen

== See also ==
- Marieme
- Maryam (disambiguation)
- Mariam (disambiguation)
- Miriam (disambiguation)
