= Maryam (name) =

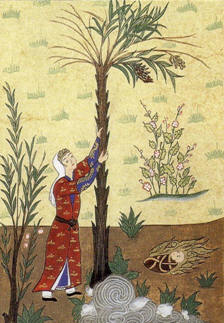
- Ottoman miniature of Maryam (Mary)
- Pronunciation: Arabic: [ˈmarjam] Persian: [mæɾˈjæm] Amharic: [mäɾˈjäm] Malayalam: [marijam] Turkish: [mæɾˈjæm]
- Gender: feminine
- Language: Arabic; Syro-Aramaic; Amharic; Tigrinya; Armenian; Georgian; Persian; Turkish

Origin
- Origin: Hebrew (Possibly from Egyptian)
- Region of origin: Ancient Near East

Other names
- Related names: Maria; Mariah; Marie; Marija; Mariya; Mary; Merieme; Meryem; Miriam; Miryam; Myriam; Mia; Maura; Marian

Maryam or Mariam (Hebrew: מרים; Imperial Aramaic: ܡܪܝܡ; Arabic: مريم) is the Aramaic form of the biblical name Miriam (the name of the prophetess Miriam, the sister of Moses). It is notably the name of Mary, the mother of Jesus.

Via its use in the New Testament the name has been adopted worldwide, especially in Roman Catholicism, but also in Eastern Christianity, in Protestantism, and in Islam. In Latin Christianity, the Greek form Mariam was adopted as latinate Maria (whence French Marie and English Mary). Forms retaining the final -m are found throughout the Middle East, in Arabic, Armenian, Georgian, Urdu, and Persian, as well as the Horn of Africa, including Amharic, Tigrinya, and Somali, Turkish and in Malayalam as Mariyam in south India.

== Etymology ==
The name may have originated from the Egyptian language; in a suggestion going back to 1897, it is possibly derivative of the root mr "love; beloved" (compare mry.t-ymn "Merit-Amun", i.e. "beloved of Amun"). Maas (1912) references (but rejects) a 1906 suggestion interpreting the name as "beloved of Yahweh". Maas (1912) further proposes possible derivation from Hebrew, either from marah "to be rebellious", or (more likely) from mara "well nourished".

The name has a long tradition of scholarly etymologisation; some seventy suggestions are treated by Otto Bardenhewer in monographic form in his Der Name Maria (1895). It was early etymologized as containing the Hebrew root mr "bitter" (cf. myrrh), or mry "rebellious". St. Jerome (writing c. 390), following Eusebius of Caesarea, translates the name as "drop of the sea" (stilla maris in Latin), from Hebrew מר mar "drop" (cf. Isaiah 40:15) and ים yam "sea". This translation was subsequently rendered stella maris ("star of the sea") due to scribal error, whence the Virgin Mary's title Star of the Sea. Rashi, an 11th-century Jewish commentator on the Bible, wrote that the name was given to the sister of Moses because of the Egyptians' harsh treatment of Jews in Egypt. Rashi wrote that the Israelites lived in Egypt for two hundred ten years, including eighty-six years of cruel enslavement that began at the time Moses' elder sister was born. Therefore, the girl was called Miriam, because the Egyptians made life bitter (מַר, mar) for her people.

== Modern given name ==
Modern given names derived from Aramaic Maryam are frequent in Christian culture, as well as, due to the Quranic tradition of Mary, extremely frequently given in Islamic cultures. There are a large number of variants and derivations.

The New Testament gives the name as both Mariam (Μαριάμ) and Maria (Μαρία). The Latin Vulgate uses the first declension, Maria.

Maryam is the now-usual English-language rendition of the Arabic name. The spelling Mariyam (in German-language contexts also Marijam) is sometimes used as a close transcription from Hebrew, Aramaic or Arabic.

The spelling Mariam is current in transliteration from Georgian and Armenian, and in German-language transliteration from Aramaic or Arabic. Mariam was also a current spelling in early modern English, as in the Jacobean era play The Tragedy of Mariam.

== Derived names ==
Maryam as the name of Mary mother of Jesus is also part of given names consisting of genitive constructions (idafa) in Ethiopian tradition, such as Haile Mariam "power of Mary", Baeda Maryam "Hand of Mary", several people Newaya Maryam "Property of Mary" or Takla Maryam "Plant of Mary", used as masculine given names. In Arabic, Marwan, meaning "one who is fragrant like myrrh", could be the masculine form of Maryam.

Ustad Ali Maryam, architect in 19th century Persia, added Maryam to his name after building a house for an important woman with that name.

== People named Maryam ==
=== Notable people with the name Maryam ===
- Maryam Abacha (born 1947), widow of Sani Abacha, de facto President of Nigeria from 1993 to 1998
- Maryam Tanveer Ali, popularly known as Maya Ali (born 1989), Pakistani television actress
- Maryam Rashed Alzoaby, Emirati writer and novelist
- Maryam Babangida (1948–2009), wife of Nigeria's head of state from 1985 to 1993
- Maryam bint Uthman (1810–1880s), Islamic scholar from the Sokoto Caliphate
- Mariam Dagga, (1992 – 2025) Palestinian journalist
- Maryam d'Abo (born 1960), English film and television actress
- Maryam Fatima (born 1997), Pakistani actress
- Maryam Goumbassian (1831–1909), Ottoman Armenian actress
- Maryam Hosseinian (1975–2025), Iranian writer
- Maryam Khanom (1770–1843), royal consort of Agha Mohammad Shah (r. 1789–1797), and then the royal consort of Agha Mohammad's nephew and successor Fath-Ali Shah Qajar (r. 1797–1834)
- Maryam Khan (born 1989), American politician
- Maryam Matar (born 1975), Emirati geneticist and medical researcher
- Maryam Mirzakhani (1977–2017), Iranian mathematician
- Maryam Moghaddam (born 1970), Iranian actress and filmmaker
- Maryam Monsef (born 1984), Afghan Canadian politician
- Maryam Nemazee, Iranian British broadcast journalist
- Maryam Nawaz Sharif (born 1973), Pakistani politician
- Maryam Omar (born 1993), Kuwaiti-born Palestinian cricketer
- Maryam Rajavi (born 1953), leader of the People's Mujahedin of Iran
- Maryam Salour (born 1954), Iranian visual artist
- Maryam Shanechi (born 1981), Iranian-American neuro engineers
- Maryam Yakubova (1931–2018), Uzbek educator
- Maryam Zakaria (born 1984), Swedish-Iranian actress

=== Notable people with spelling variations of the name Maryam ===
- Myriem Akheddiou (born 1978), Belgian Moroccan actress
- Mariam al-Asturlabi, astrolabist in Aleppo during the Islamic Golden Age
- Mariam A. Aleem (1930–2010), Egyptian artist and academic
- Mariam Ansari, 21st century Pakistani film actress
- Marriyum Aurangzeb (born 1980), Pakistani politician
- Mariam Battistelli, Italian operatic soprano and actress
- Meriem Belmihoub (1935–2021), Algerian freedom fighter
- Mariem Ben Chaabane (born 1983), Tunisian actress
- Meriam Ben Hussein, 21st century Tunisian actress
- Meriem Ben Mami (born 1980), Tunisian actress
- Meriem Bennani (born 1988), Moroccan animator
- Mariam Bolkvadze (born 1998), Georgian tennis player
- Mériem Bouatoura (1938–1960), Algerian militant during the war of independence
- Mariam Brahim, (born 1956), Chadian physician
- Mariam Chamilova (born 1994), Russian-Canadian rhythmic gymnast
- Mariam Sy Diawara, 21st century Ivorian and Canadian businesswoman
- Mariam Issoufou (born 1979), Nigerien architect
- Mariam Mamadashvili (born 2005), Georgian singer
- Myriam Mizouni (born 1958), Tunisian swimmer
- Mariam Mirza (born 1975), Pakistani television actress and beautician
- Meriem Moussa (born 1988), Algerian judoka
- Marium Mukhtiar (1992–2015), Pakistan Air Force pilot
- Myriem Nacer (born 2002), Algerian footballer
- Mariyam Nafees (born 1994), Pakistani television actress
- Mariam Shengelia (born 2002), Georgian singer

== See also ==
- Maryam (disambiguation)
- Miriam (given name)
- Maria (given name)
- Mary in Islam
