= Maram Ben Aziza =

Tunisian actress

- مرام بن عزيزة
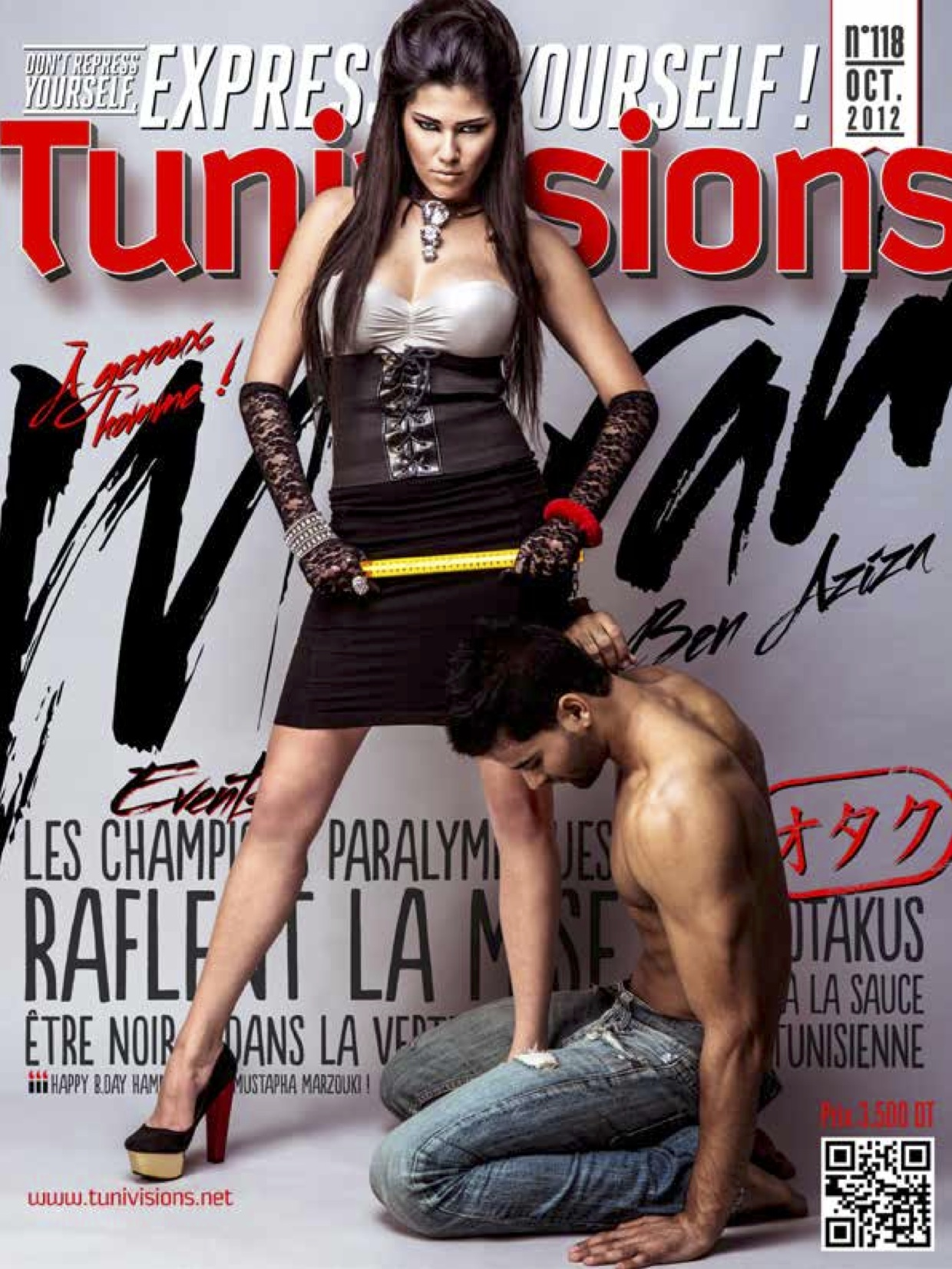
- Maram Ben Aziza on the magazine cover of Tunivisions in 2012.
- Born: December 25, 1986 (age 39); Carthage, Tunisia
- Occupations: Actor model
- Years active: 2004–2021
- Spouse: Nadim Habassi (m. 2018; div. 2019)

Maram Ben Aziza (Arabic: مرام بن عزيزة, born December 25, 1986), is a Tunisian actress, model, and entrepreneur, best known for her role of Selima in the Tunisian series Maktoub.

== Biography ==
Maram Ben Aziza born on December 25, 1986, in Carthage, Tunisia. She has been passionate about dance and fashion from a very young age. She started a modeling career since 2000, she did represent several beauty brands and posed for some magazine covers. She started her acting career after her successful appearance in the Tunisian series Maktoub in 2009.

In 2011 Maram starred in the Tunisian film Histoires tunisiennes by Nada Mezni Hafaiedh, later on she acted in multiple films and television series. She also works as a host and columnist in television lately.

The actress quickly became an Instagram influencer, with more than 2 million followers as of 2019.

Founder of a fancy clothes and accessories store, Maramode, she also owns a restaurant, Omek Houria in Tunis.

== Personal life ==
Maram married Nadim Habassi in January 2018, and the couple divorced in 2019.

== Filmography ==
=== Film ===
- 2006: Rue Tanit (Tanit Street) by Fayçal Bouzayen Chemmami
- 2011: Histoires tunisiennes (Tunisian Stories) by Nada Mezni Hafaiedh: As Sabrine
- 2011: Black Gold by Jean-Jacques Annaud
- 2011: Sauve qui peut (Every Man for Himself) (Short film) by Fethi Doghri
- 2014: My China Doll by Rachid Ferchiou
- 2015: Lan Taadilou (You Won't Be Fair) by Atef Ben Hassine

=== Television ===
==== Series ====
- 2009 – 2014: Maktoub (Destiny) (seasons 2–4) by Sami Fehri: As Selima
- 2010: Nsibti Laaziza (My Beloved Mother in Law) (season 1) by Slaheddine Essid
- 2012: Omar by Hatem Ali: as wife of Yazdegerd III (Maria)
- 2013: Allô Maa (Hello Mom) by Kaïs Chekir: as Maram Ben Aziza
- 2013: Happy Ness (season 1) by Majdi Smiri: as Maram
- 2015: School (season 2) by Rania Gabsi & Sofien Letaiem: as Folla
- 2015: Lilet Chak (The Doubt Night) by Majdi Smiri: as Lilia
- 2015: Histoires Tunisiennes (Tunisian Stories) by Nada Mezni Hafaiedh: as Sabrine
- 2016: Al Akaber (The Aristocratic) by Madih Belaïd: as Mariem
- 2016: Samarkand by Eyad Al Khzuz
- 2017: Awled Moufida (Moufida's Sons) (season 3) by Sami Fehri: as Nour / Seddik's Secret Daughter / Seddik's Assistant
- 2017: Lemnara (The Lighthouse) by Atef Ben Hassine: as Maram Ben Aziza
- 2018: Lavage (Washing) by Saif Dhrif: as Racha Ben Said
- 2018: Elli Lik Lik by Kaïs Chekir: as Narjes
- 2021: Ouled El Ghoul by Mourad Ben Cheikh: as Jamila / Jiji
- 2023: Djebel Lahmar by Rabii Tekali: Kaouther

==== TV shows ====
- 2011: Khallik Fashion on Tunisna TV: TV Presenter
- 2013: Dhouk Tohsel of Kaouther Belhaj on Tunisna TV: Guest of Episode 4
- 2013: Taxi on Ettounsiya TV: Guest of Episode 5
- 2013: Startime on Tunisna TV: Guest of Episode 32
- 2013: Fo Casting on Tunisna TV: Guest of Episode 2
- 2013: Labès (We Are Fine) on Attessia TV with Naoufel Ouertani: Guest of Episode 2
- 2014: Braquage on Jawhara FM: Guest
- 2015: Ettayara (The Plane) on Attessia TV: Guest 4
- 2016: Tahadi El Chef (The Chef Challenge) on M Tunisia: Guest of Episode 20
- 2016: Tendance+ on Attessia TV: TV Presenter
- 2016: Romdhane Show on Mosaique FM: Guest
- 2017: Abdelli Showtime with Lotfi Abdelli on Attessia TV: Guest of Episode 7 PART 2 of Season 4
- 2017: Labès with Naoufel Ouertani on Attessia TV: Guest of Episode 1 of Season 7
- 2017: Labès with Naoufel Ouertani on Attessia TV: Guest of Episode 32 of Season 7
- 2017: Dbara w Ziara: Guest of Episode 2
- 2018: Klem Ennes (Invitée De L'Episode 20 De La Saison 6)
- 2018: Abdelli Showtime with Lotfi Abdelli: Guest of Episode 2 (Part 3) of Season 5
- 2019: Bas Les Masques (Down The Masks) with Amine Gara on El Hiwar Ettounsi: Guest of Episode 13 of Season 1
- 2019: Eli Baadou (Afterword) on El Hiwar El Tounsi
- 2019: 90 Minutes on El Hiwar El Ttounsi with Hédi Zaiem: Guest of Episode 14 of Season 1
- 2019: Fekret Sami Fehri (The Idea of Sami Fehri) on El Hiwar El Tounsi: Guest of Part 2 of Episode 3 of Season 2
- 2019: 360° of Hédi Zaiem on El Hiwar Ettounsi
- 2019: Dimanche Tout Est Permis (Sunday Everything Is Permitted) of Nidhal Saâdi: Guest of Episode 19 Partie 3 of Season 2
- 2019 – 2020: Eli Baadou (Epilogue) on El Hiwar El Tounsi: Chronicler
- 2020: Fekret Sami Fehri (The Idea of Sami Fehri) (Season 2) with Hédi Zaiem on El Hiwar Ettounsi: Episode 21 of Season 2
- 2020: 5ème Arbitre
- 2020: Hkeyet Tounsia with Sonia Dahmani (Episode 31 of Season 3 Part 1)
- 2020: Sahri Bahri: Guest of Episode 2
- 2021: Dari Darek (web show) of Amel Smaoui on YouTube Channel of Radio IFM: Guest of Episode 9
- 2021: Dbara w Ziara: Guest of Episode 13 of Season 1

== Videos ==
- 2014: Maram Ben Aziza: Je n'ai aucun Problème avec Hannibal TV (Maram Ben Aziza: I don't have a problem with Hannibal TV)
- 2014: Interview Maram ben Aziza By BF Magazine
- 2016: Interview Maram Ben Aziza by Focus Optique: Muse Michael Kors Tunisie
- 2016: Anniversary Surprise Maram Ben Aziza au Tunnel
- 2016: WEPOST Chrono: Maram Ben Aziza
- 2016: Maram Ben Aziza avec Shinyman.com: Maram Ben Aziza New Muse of Samsung Tunisia
- 2016: Maram Ben Aziza describes the critical humanitary situation in Aïn Draham
- 2017: Maram Ben Aziza on Shems FM: My Role in the TV serial "Akaber" is different
- 2018: Maram Ben Aziza responds to her critics...
- 2020: Maram Ben Aziza: How Much Money Do You Earn from Instagram and TV?
- 2020: Maram Ben Aziza, The Interview by Faza.tn
- 2021: Maram Ben Aziza Corona Virus Rationnement? Tunisie
