= Aïcha Ben Ahmed =

Tunisian actress

- عائشة بن أحمد
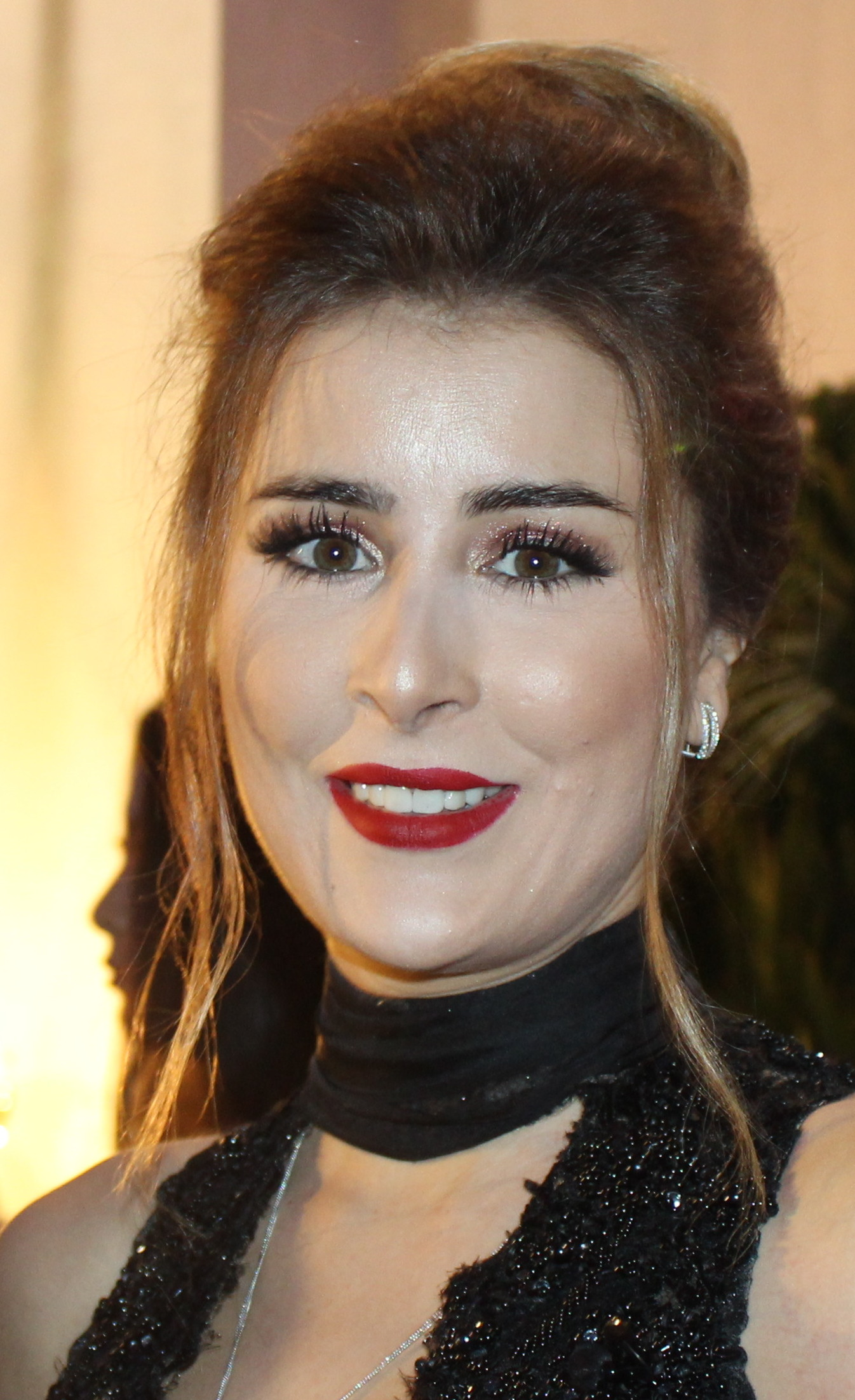
- Ben Ahmed on the opening ceremony of the Carthage Film Festival in 2018.
- Born: 7 February 1984 (age 42); Tunis, Tunisia
- Occupation: Actress
- Years active: 2010–present
- Known for: Egyptian cinema

Aïcha Ben Ahmed (Arabic: عائشة بن أحمد; born 7 February 1984) is a Tunisian actress who has performed in film, on the stage and on television. She worked in the Egyptian cinema and has appeared in several Egyptian films including Saint Augustin, La cellule and Zizou. For her appearance as Hind in Narcisse, Aziz Rouhou, she won the award for best actress at the 2016 Al Hoceïma Film Festival in Morocco.

== Biography ==
Born on 7 February 1989, Aïcha Ben Ahmed is the daughter of a Tunisair captain. As a result, she travelled widely as she received free tickets. While still young, she danced in the Sihem Belkhodja group before studying graphic art and publicity at the Ecole d'Art et de Décoration in Tunis. She began her career as an actress in 2010, taking a small part in Nada Mezni Hafaiedh's feature film Histoires tunisiennes. The following year she was given a part in the Syrian film Mon dernier ami directed by Joud Said.

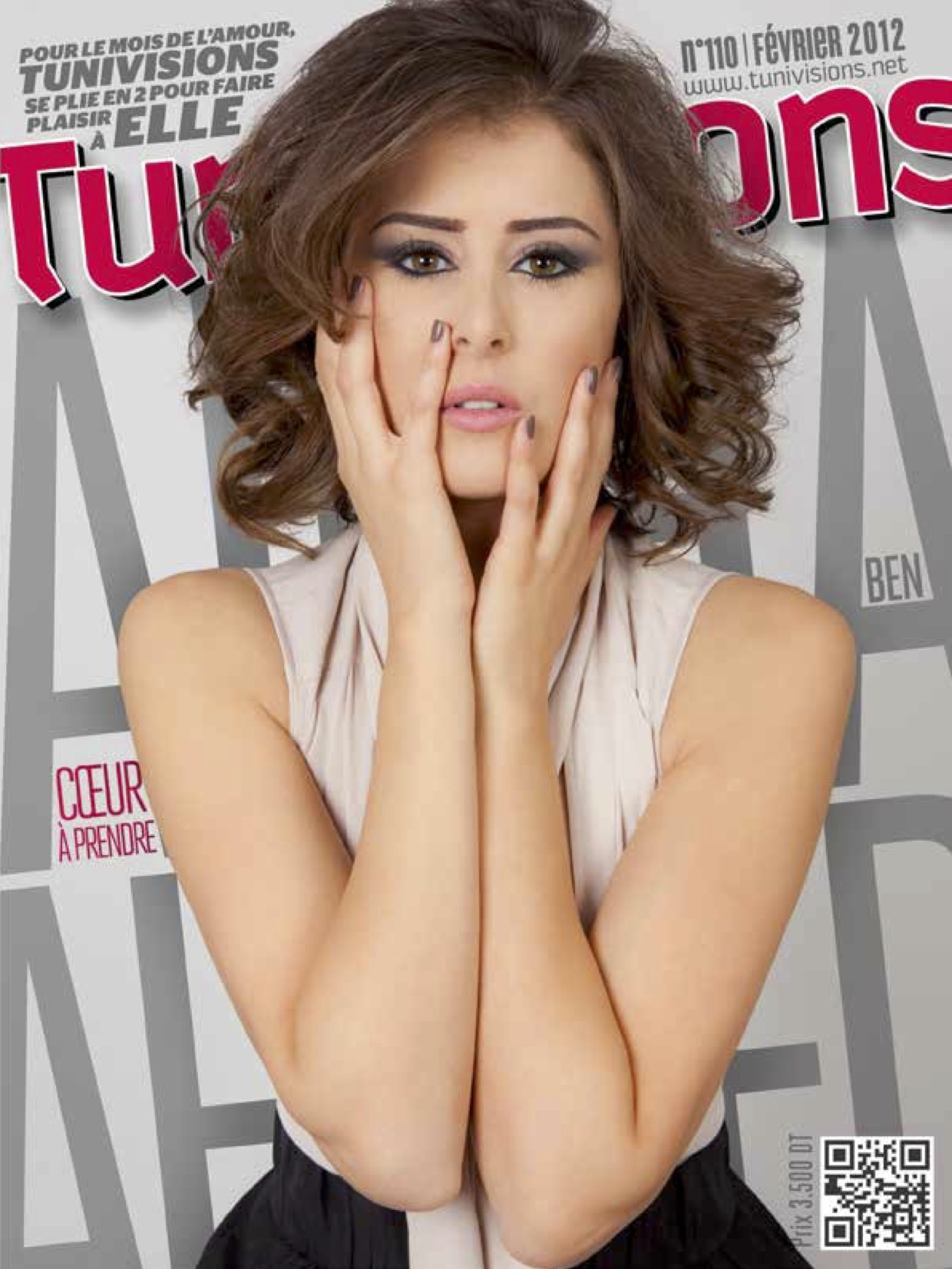
Aïcha Ben Ahmed on the February 2012 cover of Tunivisions

In 2012, appearing as Nadia in the television series Pour les beaux yeux de Catherine, she became well known in Tunisia. She then played Zohra in Mohamed Damak's Tunisian feature film Jeudi après-midi (2013).

She went to Egypt in 2015 to appear first in Raouf Abdel Aziz's television series Les Mille et une nuits. She had been specially selected to play the role of Qamar Zamen, an amnesiac who tried to establish her identity. Her role as the heroine in Sonia Chamkhi's Narcisse (in Arabic Aziz Rouhou) was particularly effective. She went on to win the award for best actress at the 2016 Al Hoceïma Film Festival in Morocco. She also appeared in Férid Boughédir's Ziou or Parfum de printemps which was awarded the "best film" prize at the 2016 Cairo Film Festival.

Still in Egypt, in 2017, Ben Ahmed played the part of Nuha in Tarek Al Eryan's film The Cell. She has also recently starred in two Egyptian television series: as Laila in Aigle de la Haute Egypte, for which she was required to cultivate the local accent, and in Flèches filantes where she played a terrorist.

== Filmography ==
=== Cinema ===
- 2011 : Tunisian Stories (Arabic: حكايات تونسية) by Nada Mezni Hafaiedh
- 2012 : Mon dernier ami (Arabic: صديقي الأخير) (My Last Friend) by Joud Saïd and Fares Al Zahabi
- 2013 : Jeudi après-midi (Thursday afternoon) by Mohamed Damak and Tarek Ben Chaâban : Zohra
- 2015 : Narcisse (Narcissus) by Sonia Chamkhi : Hend
- 2016 : Parfum de printemps (Spring perfume) by Férid Boughedir : Khadija
- 2017 : Saint Augustin, le fils de ses larmes (Saint Augustine, the son of his tears) by Samir Seïf and Sameh Samy : Monica
- 2017 : The Cell by Tarek Al Eryan and Salah El Geheiny (English) : Nouha, Amr's wife
- 2019 :The Money (Egyptian Arabic: الفلوس) by Said El Marouk, Wael Nabil, Mohammed Abd Elmoaty and Tamer Hosny : Hayla
- 2020 : Taw'am Rouhy (My Soulmate) by Othman Abou Laban and Amani Tounsi : Alia, May, Malak, Hana
- 2021 : Ritsa by Ahmed Yousry and Moatz Fteha : Ritsa

=== Television ===
==== Tunisian series ====
- 2012 : Pour les beaux yeux de Catherine (Arabic: لأجل عيون كاترين) (For the beautiful eyes of Catherine) by Hamadi Arafa and Rafika Boujday : Nadia
- 2013 : Njoum Ellil (season 4) by Mehdi Nasra
- 2021 : Harga (ar) by Lassaad Oueslati, Imed Eddine Hakim and Jouda Méjri : Hela

==== Foreign series ====
- 2015 : Alf Leila wa Leila (Arabic: الف ليله وليله) (Arabian Nights) by Raouf Abdel Aziz and Mohamed Nayer : Kamar Zaman
- 2016 : Shehadet Melad (Arabic: شهادة ميلاد) by Ahmed Medhat and Amr Samir Atef : Amal Zahar
- 2018 : Al Seham Al Mareqa ( Arabic : السهام المارقة ) (Flèches filantes) by Mahmoud Kamel and Shereen Diab : Maman by Oubay
- 2018 : Nasser El Saïd (The Saïd Eagle) by Yasser Sami, Mohamed Abdel Moaty and Ahmed Ali Mossa : Layla
- 2018 : Abwab Alshaki by Ahmed Samir Farag, Mohamed Nayer, Karim El Dalil, Beshoy Hanna and Rami Ismail : Dina
- 2019 : Abou Jabal by Ahmed Salah and Mohamed Sayed Bashir : Mayem
- 2021 : Leabet Newton (Arabic: لعبة نيوتن) (Newton's Cradle) by Engy Fethi and Tamer Mohsen : Amina
- 2022 : Malaf Serry by Hassan El Balasi and Mahmoud Hagag : Maryem Melky
- 2022 : The Affair (Arabic: النزوة) by Amir Ramses and Mohammed El Hajj : Hela
- 2022 : Waad Iblis by Colin Teague, Ashraf Hamed, Tony Jordan, Engy Loman Field and Suha Al Khalifa
- 2023 : Muzakirat Zoug by Tamer Nady, Ahmed Bahgat and Mohamed Soliman Abdul Malek : Shereen
- 2023 : My soul in you by Mohamed Lotfi and Mustapha Mahmoud : Jamila
- 2024 : Bedon Sabeq Enthar by Hani Khalifa, Ammar Sabry, Alma Kafarneh, Samar Taher, Karim El Dalil and Amr El Daly : Layla

==== TV films ====
- 2012 : Barabbas by Roger Young : Mary of Bethany

==== Emissions ====
- 2013 : El Zilzal (episode 15) on El Hiwar El Tounsi : Guest
- 2013 : Dhouk Tohsel (episode 2) on Tunisna TV : Guest
- 2014 : Maakom with Mona El-Shazly on CBC : Guest
- 2018 : 90 Minutes on Mehwar TV : Guest
- 2020 : Take care of Fifi with Fifi Abdou on MBC Masr and MBC 5 : Guest
- 2021 : Five stars on MBC Masr : Guest
