= Meriam Ben Hussein =

Tunisian actress

- مريم بن حسين
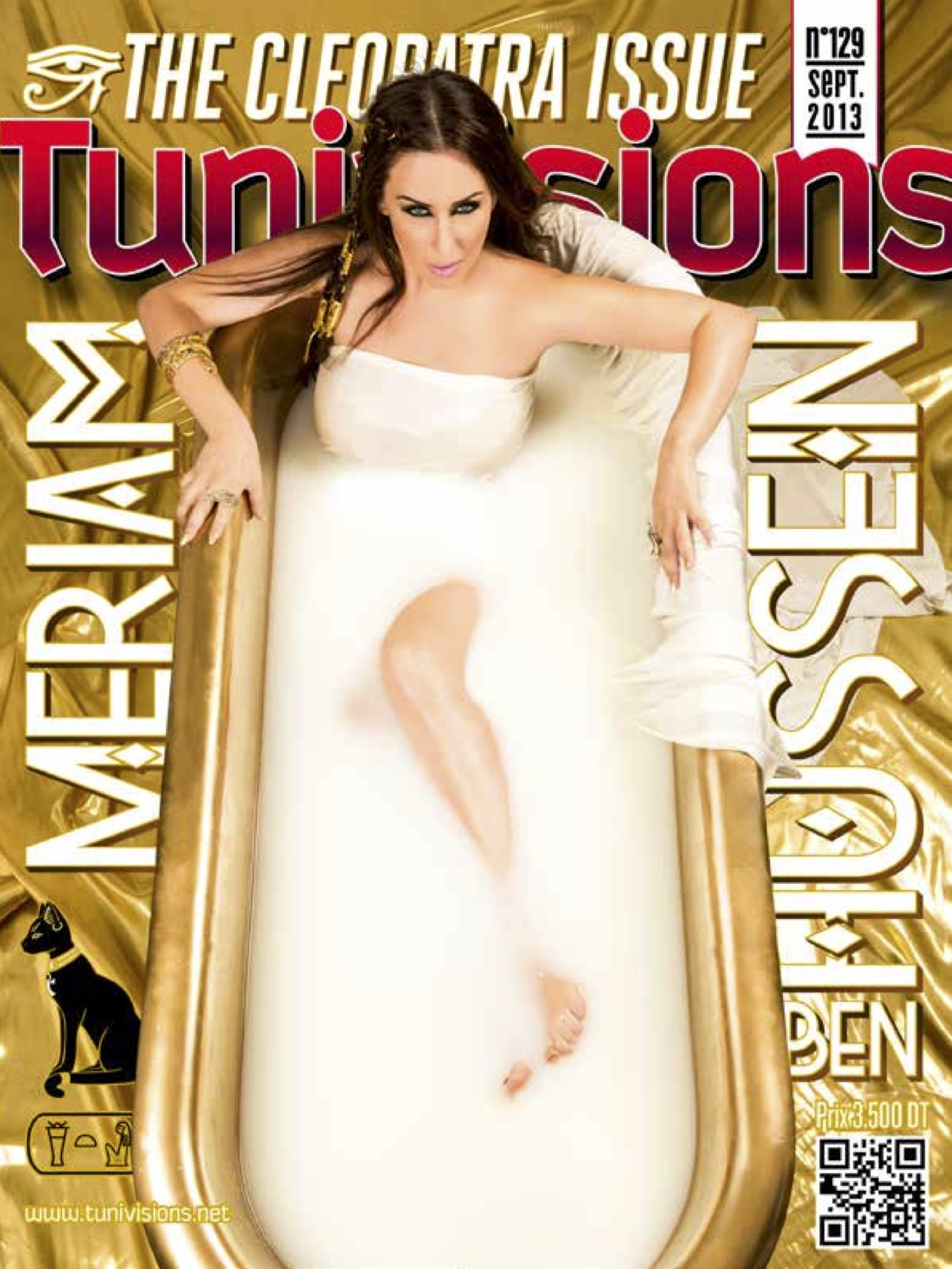
- Ben Hussein on the cover of Tunivisions, in September 2013.
- Occupations: Actress, Television présenter, Radio personality

Meriam Ben Hussein (Arabic: مريم بن حسين) is a Tunisian actress.

== Filmography ==
=== Television series ===
- 2012–2014: Maktoub (seasons 3–4) by Sami Fehri: Malek
- 2013: Layem by Khaled Barsaoui; role of Durra
- 2015: Naouret El Hawa (seasons 2) by Madih Belaid: Alya
- 2015: Histoires tunisiennes by Nada Mezni Hafaiedh: Baya
- 2017: Flashback (seasons 2) by Mourad Ben Cheikh
- 2018: Tej El Hadhira by Sami Fehri: Lella Mannena
- 2019: El Maestro by Lassaad Oueslati
- 2019: Nouba by Abdelhamid Bouchnak: Salma

=== Emissions ===
==== Animator ====
- 2001 : Hit Parade on El Watania 1
- 2008–2009 : Yalli Mâana on Hannibal TV
- 2011 : Hadra mouch ki okhtha on TWT
- 2012 : Taratata on Dubai TV
- 2014 : Andi Manghanilek on El Hiwar El Tounsi
- 2017 : Howa w Hia on Attessia TV
- 2018 : with Mariem Ben Hussein on Attessia TV

== Radio ==
- 2012 : Mechwar on Radio IFM
- 2013 : Drive Time on Radio Kalima
- 2014 : Drive Time on Cap FM
