= Meriem Ben Mami =

Tunisian actress (born 1980)

Mariem Ben Mami
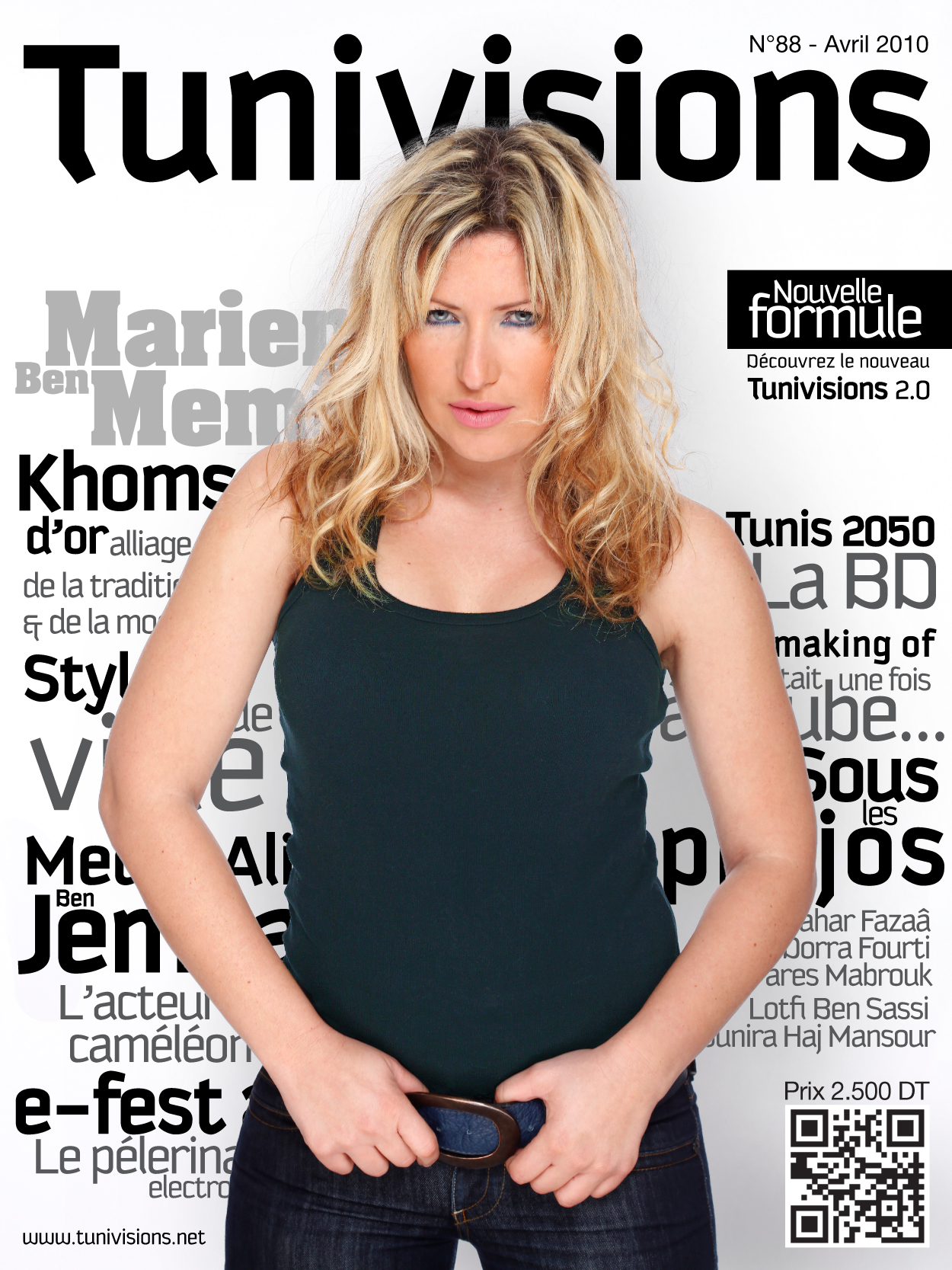
- Mariem ben Mami on the cover of the Tunisian magazine Tunivisions No.88 Issue
- Born: January 1, 1980 (age 46); Tunis, Tunisia
- Occupations: Actress, Television presenter
- Years active: 1996–2020 2024–present
- Known for: Playing Chahinez on the Tunisian drama serie Maktoub

Meriem Ben Mami (Arabic: مريم بن مامي) is a Tunisian former actress.

== Early life ==
Ben Mami was born on 1 January 1980 in Tunis to a Tunisian father and a mother with mixed Egyptian, Syrian and Lebanese roots.

== Filmography ==
=== Cinema ===
- 2013 : Les Épines du jasmin by Rachid Ferchiou

=== Television ===
==== series ====
- 2008 - 2014 : Maktoub by Sami Fehri : Chahinez Maaouia
- 2013 - 2014 : Caméra Café by Ibrahim Letaïef : Douja
- 2013 : Happy Ness (season 1) by Majdi Smiri : Mimi
- 2015 : Histoires tunisiennes by Nada Mezni Hafaiedh : Inès
- 2017 : Dawama by Naim Ben Rhouma : Kamilya
- 2018 : Familia Lol by Nejib Mnasria : Farah El Ayech
- 2018 : Tej El Hadhra by Sami Fehri : Lalla Douja

==== Emissions ====
- 2012 : Le Crocodile (episode 5) on Ettounsiya TV : Guest
- 2013 : Le Braquage (episode 10) on Nessma : Guest
- 2015 : Dari Déco on Ettounsiya TV : animator
- 2016 : Tahadi El Chef (episode 21) on M Tunisia : Guest
- 2016 : Omour Jedia on Ettounsiya TV : chronicler
- 2017 : Aroussa w Aris on El Hiwar El Tounsi : animator

=== Videos ===
- 2011 : I Love Tunisia, the place to be now by Mohamed Ali Nahdi and Majdi Smiri
