= Samira Magroun =

Tunisian actress (born 1987)

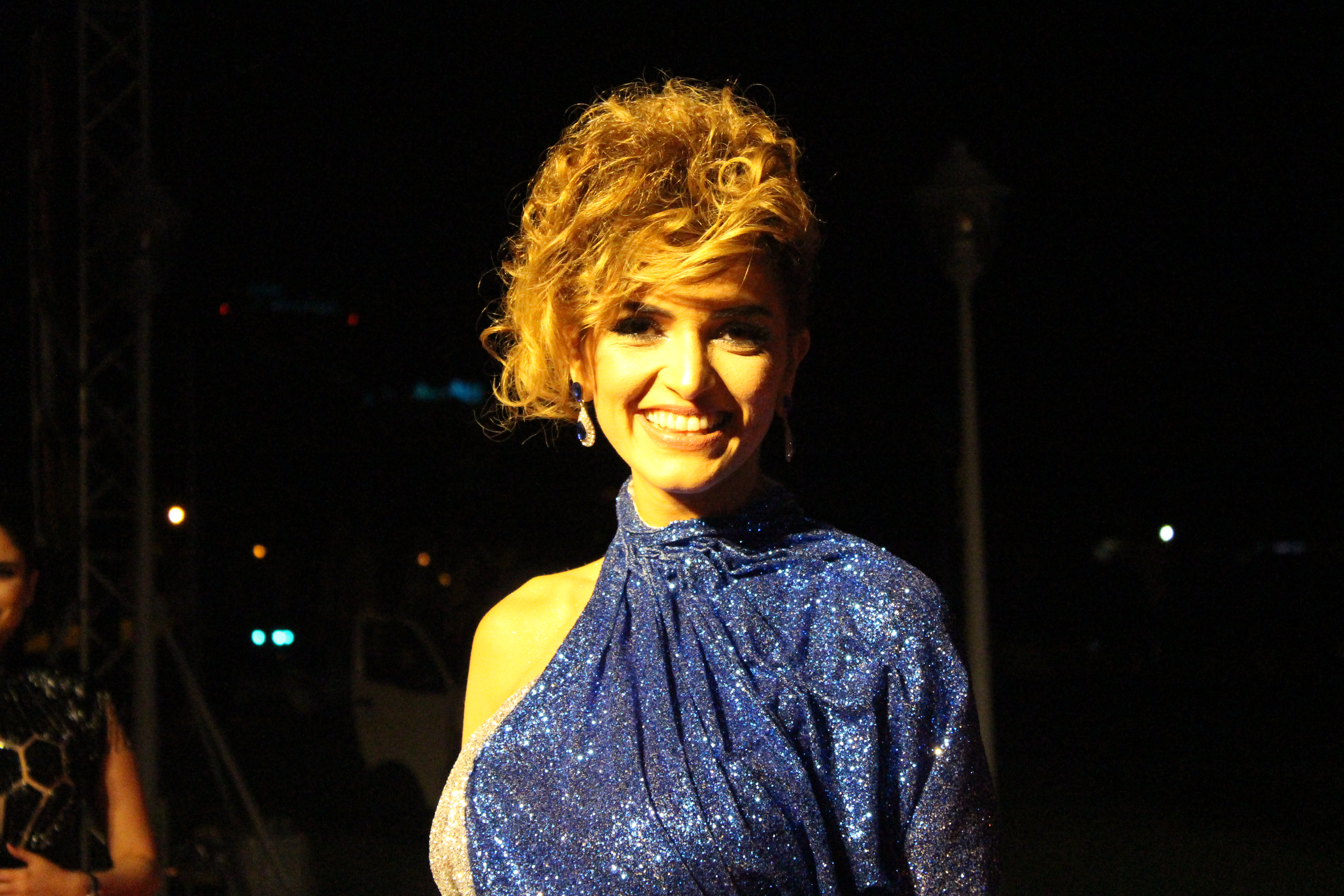
- Magroun at the 2018 Carthage Film Festival
- Born: 24 January 1987 (age 39)
- Occupation: Actress
- Years active: 2007-present

Samira Magroun (born 24 January 1987) is a Tunisian actress.

== Biography ==
Magroun has several sisters. As a child, she was interested in becoming an actress and was contacted for several commercials, but did not pursue it. Magroun studied English after high school. She subsequently attended flight attendant school and was recruited by Nouvel Air before embarking on her acting career.

== Career ==
Magroun got her start in show business in Dlilek Mlak, the Tunisian version of Deal or No Deal, in 2007. After the show ended, she was contacted by Sami Fehri about a new soap opera he was working on, but he did not offer her a leading role at first. Fehri was pleasantly surprised by Magroun's performance, and she was chosen for the role of Syrine in Maktoub, which began in 2008. Her character is a naive woman who is manipulated by her possessive fiancé, Elyes, and Magroun stated that girls like her are abundant in society.

In 2010, Magroun starred in the sitcom Garage Lekrik as Lobna, a materialistic girl who has a confused relationship with Boulouna, played by Lotfi Abdelli. When she was offered the role, she accepted it immediately because it was a good opportunity and the cast had good actors. In September 2010, Magroun starred in the Syrian TV series Takht Charki written by Yam Mach'hadi and directed by Racha Chabartji.

== Personal life ==
Magroun got engaged to the footballer Adel Chedli in April 2012. She gave birth to a son by Chedli, Koussay. The pair were married for two years before getting divorced. In May 2020, Magroun gave birth to her second child, daughter Zayna from her second marriage with a British Pakistani businessman zayn.

== Cinema ==
- 2015 : Karam El-King by Hazem Fouda & Sofi Haddad
- 2025: Sahbek Rajel 2 by qays shqir

== Tunisian TV Serials ==
- 2008-2014 : Maktoub (Destiny) by Sami Fehri : Cyrine
- 2010 : Garage Lekrik by Ridha Behi : Lobna
- 2013 : Allô Maa by Kais Chekir
- 2019 : Ali Chouerreb (season 2) by Madih Belaid et Rabii Tekali : Zlaikha
- 2021 : Inchallah Mabrouk by Bassem Hamraoui : Hasna
- 2022 : el Foundou 2 ( Saoussen jemni) : Guest of episodes 8, 9, 10, 16 & 17 : Hanen, Momo's mother

== Foreign TV serials ==
- 2010 : Takht Charki by Racha Chabartji
- 2010 : Dhakiret El Jassad by Najdat Ismail Anzour
- 2015 : Baad El Bedaya by Ahmed Khaled Moussa
- 2016 : Waad by Ibrahim Fakhar
- 2016 : Abu el banat by Raouf Abdelaziz
- 2015 : tareequy ( طريقي ( by Mohamed Shaker
- 2016 : Elkabret Elahmar ( الكبريت الاحمر ( by khairy bechara and seif youssef
- 2018 : Elkabret Elahmar 2 ) كارما ( by issam Chammaa
- 2018 : Rassayel ( رسايل ( by Ibrahim Fakhr
- 2019 : zelzal ( زلزال ( by Ibrahim Fakhr
- 2018 : Jeeran ( جيران ( by Amer Fahd

== TV shows ==
- 2007 : Dlilek Mlak on Tunisie 7 with Sami fehri
- 2014 : Taxi 2 on Nessma
