= Maryam =

Maryam may refer to:

- Maryam Castle, a castle in Kermanshah Province, Iran
- Maryam (name), a feminine given name (the Aramaic and Arabic form of Miriam, Mary)
- Mary in Islam
- Maryam (surah), 19th sura of the Qur'an
- Maryam, Iran, a village in East Azerbaijan Province, Iran
- 85471 Maryam, an asteroid
- Maryam (1953 film), a 1953 Iranian film
- Maryam (2002 film), a 2002 film about a young Iranian immigrant living in the US during the Iran hostage crisis
- Maryam (TV series), Pakistani drama aired on Geo TV network
- Maryam Rayed, Afghan advocate for human rights, known for her contributions to peace, freedom, and equality, with a focus on the empowerment of women and youth in Afghanistan.
- Kanaya and Porrim Maryam, characters from the webcomic Homestuck (2009-2016)

== See also ==
- Mosque Maryam, a large mosque in Chicago, Illinois, and headquarters of the Nation of Islam religious movement
- Miriam (disambiguation)
- Mariam (disambiguation)
- Maryan (disambiguation)
