= Dalenda Abdou =

Tunisian actress (1928–2021)

- Born: Khira Bent Abdelkader Gharbi; 2 November 1928; Tunis, French Tunisia
- Died: 29 June 2021 (aged 92); Tunis, Tunisia
- Occupation: Actress

Dalenda Abdou, stage name of Khira Bent Abdelkader Gharbi (Arabic: دلندة عبدو; 2 November 1928 – 29 June 2021), was a Tunisian actress.

== Biography ==
Abdou began her career in the theatre in 1947 with the troupe Al Ittihad Al Masrahi de Béchir Rahal. She alternated between several other troupes, such as the Troupe du théâtre populaire led by Abdelaziz El Aroui. She adopted the pseudonym of "Dalenda Abdou" after guidance from Béchir Rahal, a pioneer of Tunisian theatre and father of singer Oulaya. She played in several theatrical performances, such as The Two Orphans.

In 1951, Abdou made her debut with Radio Tunis, where she met actor and director Mongi Ben Yaïche. She began appearing in television shows, notably playing Hnani in Mhal Chahed. She often played old women on television, a character she was considered to have mastered.

On 29 June 2021, Abdou died at age 92 in the Military Hospital of Tunis from a long illness complicated by a COVID-19 infection.

== Filmography ==
=== Cinema ===
- 1973: Ommi Traki (Mother Traki) by Abderrazak Hammami
- 2010: Live (en) (short film) by Walid Tayaa
- 2015: Conflict of Moncef Barbouch

=== Television ===
- 1992: El Douar (ar) by Abdelkader Jerbi
- 1996: El Khottab Al Bab (Grooms on the door) (guest of honor in episode 7 of season 1) by Slaheddine Essid, Ali Louati and Moncef Baldi: Habiba
- 1999: Anbar Ellil by Habib Mselmani: Ourida
- 2006: Hkeyet El Aroui by Habib El Jomni
- 2007: Salah w Sallouha
- 2007: Choufli Hal (Find me a solution) (guest of honor of episode 18 of season 4) by Slaheddine Essid: Aichoucha
- 2010: Casting by Sami Fehri
- 2014: Nsibti Laaziza (My dear mother-in-law) (guest of honor in episodes 15 and 20 of season 4) by Slaheddine Essid
