= Maryam Yakubova =

Maryam Yakubova may refer to:

- Maryam Yakubova (actress) (1909-1987), Soviet-era actress from Uzbekistan
- Maryam Yakubova (educator) (born 1931), Soviet-era educator from Uzbekistan
