= Dalila Meftahi =

Tunisian actress

- دليلة مفتاحي
- Born: 23 April 1960 (age 66)
- Occupation: Actress
- Years active: 1987-2019
- Notable work: The Wedding Song

Dalila Meftahi (Arabic: دليلة مفتاحي) is a Tunisian actress.

== Filmography ==
=== Cinema ===
==== Feature films ====
- 1997 : Redeyef 54 by Ali Labidi
- 1997 : Vivre au paradis by Bourlem Guerdjou
- 2002 : Khorma by Jilani Saadi
- 2008 : The Wedding Song by Karin Albou
- 2010 : End December by Moez Kamoun
- 2010 : Les Palmiers blessés by Abdellatif Ben Ammar
- 2011 : Black Gold by Jean-Jacques Annaud
- 2021 : L'Albatros by Fredj Trabelsi

==== Short films ====
- 2000 : En face by Mehdi Ben Attia and Zina Modiano
- 2010 : Tabou by Meriem Riveill
- 2011 : Le Fond du puits by Moez Ben Hassen

=== Television ===
==== Series ====
- 1992 :
  - El Douar by Abdelkader Jerbi : Monia
  - Liyam Kif Errih by Slaheddine Essid : Latifa
- 1993 : El Assifa by Abdelkader Jerbi
- 1995 : El Hassad by Abdelkader Jerbi
- 1997 : El Khottab Al Bab (Guest of honor of episode 7 of season 2) by Slaheddine Essid, Ali Louati and Moncef Baldi : Fadheela
- 1999 : Anbar Ellil by Habib Mselmani : Hallouma
- 2000 :
  - Ya Zahra Fi Khayali by Abdelkader Jerbi
  - Mnamet Aroussia by Slaheddine Essid : Radhia
- 2001 : Ryhana by Hamadi Arafa
- 2003 : Ikhwa wa Zaman by Hamadi Arafa
- 2004 :
  - Jari Ya Hammouda by Abdeljabar Bhouri
  - Hissabat w Aqabat by Habib Mselmani
- 2005 : Mal Wa Amal by Abdelkader Jerbi
- 2006 :
  - The Kiosk by Belgacem Briki and Moncef El Kateb : Zina
  - Hayet Wa Amani by Mohamed Ghodhbane
  - Nwassi w Ateb by Abdelkader Jerbi
- 2007 : Kamanjet Sallema by Hamadi Arafa : Donia
- 2008 :
  - Bin Ethneya by Habib Mselmani
  - Sayd Errim by Ali Mansour : Mongiya
- 2009 : Maktoub (season 2) by Sami Fehri : Ibtissem mother
- 2010 :
  - Garage Lekrik by Ridha Béhi
  - Donia by Naïm Ben Rhouma
- 2011 - 2013 : Njoum Ellil (seasons 3–4) by Mehdi Nasra
- 2012 : Pour les beaux yeux de Catherine by Hamadi Arafa : Afifa
- 2013 : Layem by Khaled Barsaoui
- 2014 - 2015 : Naouret El Hawa by Madih Belaïd : Mongia
- 2015 : Dar Elozzab by Lassaad Oueslati
- 2016 :
  - Warda w Kteb by Ahmed Rjeb : Fatma, Mohamed Ali's mother
  - Dima Ashab by Abdelkader Jerbi : Souad
- 2016 - 2017 : Flashback by Mourad Ben Cheikh
- 2017 :
  - Dawama by Naim Ben Rhouma : Haleema
  - Awled Moufida (season 3) by Sami Fehri
- 2018 : Ali Chouerreb by Madih Belaïd and Rabii Tekali : Fatma
- 2019 : Machair by Muhammet Gök
- 2020 :
  - Galb El Dhib by Bassem Hamraoui : Akri
  - Des Juges de notre histoire by Anouar Ayachi : the mother of the prince from the era of Judge Ibn Abi Mehrez
- 2021 :
  - Millionnaire by Muhammet Gök : Karima
  - Ibn khaldoun by Sami Faour : Assia's mother
- 2023: Djebel Lahmar by Rabii Tekali (guest of honor for episodes 1, 9, 11, 17 and 19–20): Rebh

==== TV movies ====
- 1987 : Un bambino di nome Gesù by Franco Rossi
- 1993 : Des héros ordinaires (episode Identity check) by Peter Kassovitz
- 2005 : Le Voyage de Louisa by Patrick Volson

==== Emissions ====
- 2013 : Taxi (episode 1) on Ettounsiya TV

== Theater ==
- 2003 : Ennar Tkhallef Erremad, staging by Dalila Meftahi
- 2005 : Antria courage, staging by Dalila Meftahi
- 2004 : Dar Hajer, staging de by Dalila Meftahi
- 2007 : Harr adhalam text by Samir Ayadi and staging by Mounira Zakraoui
- 2010 : Attamarine, staging by Dalila Meftahi

== Decorations ==
- Officer of the Order of the Republic (Tunisia, 13 August 2020)
