= Mariam (disambiguation) =

Mariam (also Maryam) is the Aramaic form of the given name Miriam, especially used of Mary mother of Jesus in a number of languages.

It may refer to:

== People named Mariam ==
- Mariam, daughter of Bagrat IV of Georgia, a member of the Bagrationi dynasty of the Kingdom of Georgia
- Mariam Baharum, Singaporean actress
- Mariam Fakhr Eddine, Egyptian actress
- Mariam Ndagire, Ugandan musician
- Mariam Wallentin, Swedish musician

== Others ==
- MV Mariam, a Bolivian-flagged passenger ferry
- Lake Mariam, a lake in Winter Haven, Florida

== See also ==
- Maryam (name)
- Maryam (disambiguation)
- Miriam (disambiguation)
