= Atef Ben Hassine =

Tunisian actor

- عاطف بن حسين
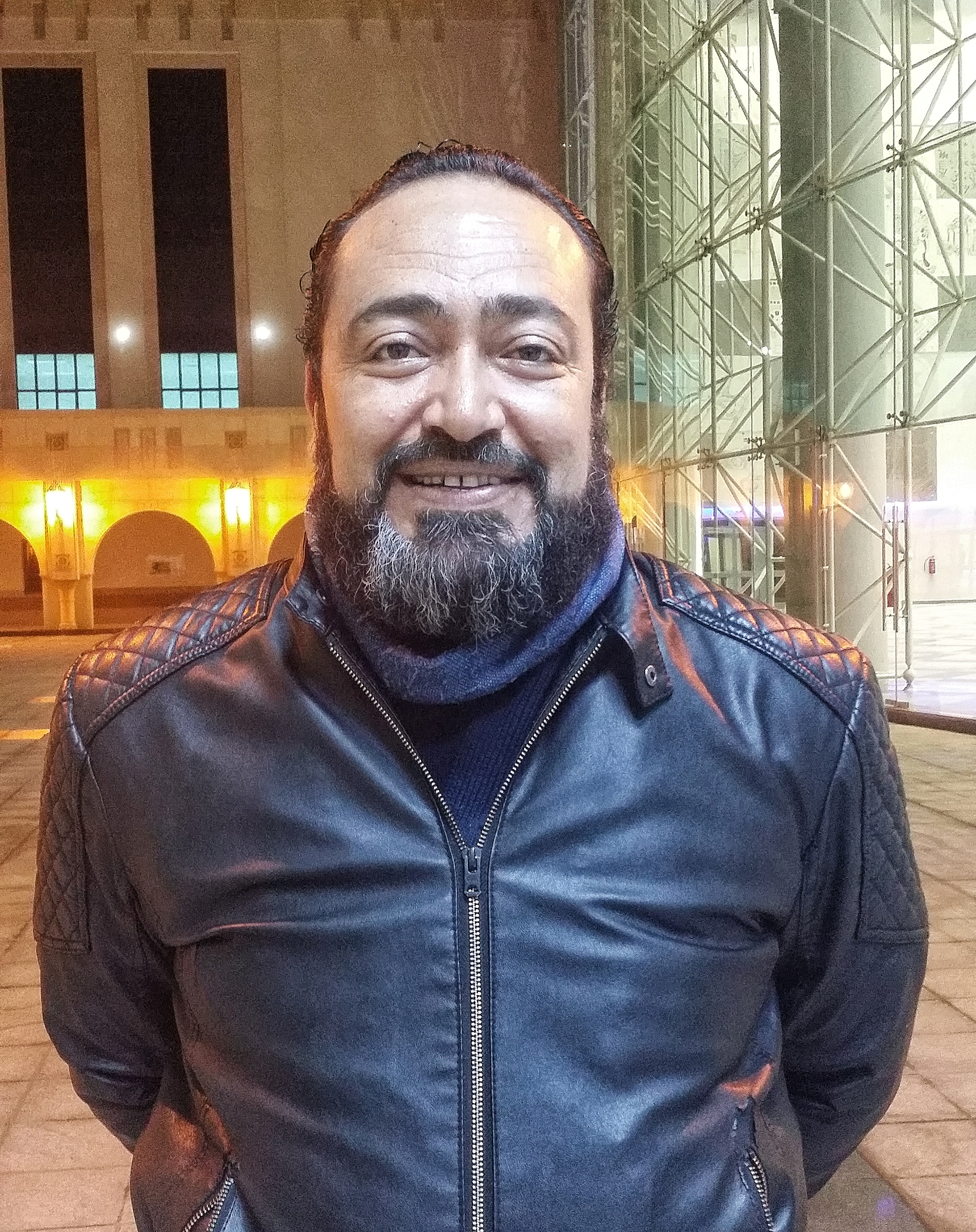
- Ben Hassine in 27 March 2018.
- Born: August 17, 1974 (age 51); Chebba, Tunisia
- Occupations: Actor, director
- Notable work: Légendes

Atef Ben Hassine (Arabic: عاطف بن حسين) (born on 17 August 1974 in Chebba) is a Tunisian actor and director.

== Filmography ==
=== Theatre ===
Year	Title	Role
1996	Temps perdu of Moez Turki and Nejib Abdelmoula	comedian
1997	Le Balcon of Hedi Abbes	comedian
1998	Quamria of Ridha Boukadida and Fethi Akkari	comedian
1999	Bahja of Mohamed Mounir Argui	comedian
2001	Ici Tunis of Taoufik Jebali	comedian
2001	Légendes	author and theatre director
2003	Les Palestiniens of Jean Genet and Taoufik Jebali	comedian
2004	Les Voleurs de Bagdad of Taoufik Jebali	comedian
2005	État civil	author and theatre director
2007	Copie non conforme	author and theatre director
2009	Faute de frappe of Houssem Sahli	comedian
2011	Intox	author and comedian
2012	Nicotine	author and theatre director

=== Film ===
Year	Film
1998	Single, short film by Lotfi Achour
2004	Ordure, short film by Lotfi Achour
2005	Tendresse du loup, feature film by Jilani Saadi
2010	Chak-Wak, short film by Nasreddine Shili
2012	Amère patience (Suçon), feature film by Nasreddine Shili

=== Television ===
Year	Series	Director	Role
2000	Ya Zahra Fi Khayali	Abdelkader Jerbi	Khaled
2003	Chez Azaiez	Slaheddine Essid	Client
2008–2009	Maktoub	Sami Fehri	Choukri Ben Nfisa alias Choko
2010	Casting	Sami Fehri	
2012	Pour les beaux yeux de Catherine	Hamadi Arafa	Arbi
2013	Njoum Ellil	Madih Belaïd	Taleb
2014	Naouret El Hawa	Madih Belaïd	Ammar
2015	Awled Moufida	Sami Fehri	Mounir
2015	Le Risque	Nasreddine Shili	Salmane El Khafi
2016	Warda w Kteb	Ahmed Rajab	Nejib Cheikher
2016	Bolice 2.0	Majdi Smiri	Guest-star
2017	Lemnara	Lui-même	Joe
2019	Ali Chouerreb (season 2)	Madih Belaid	Bechir
