= Wahida Dridi =

Tunisian actress

- وحيدة الدريدي
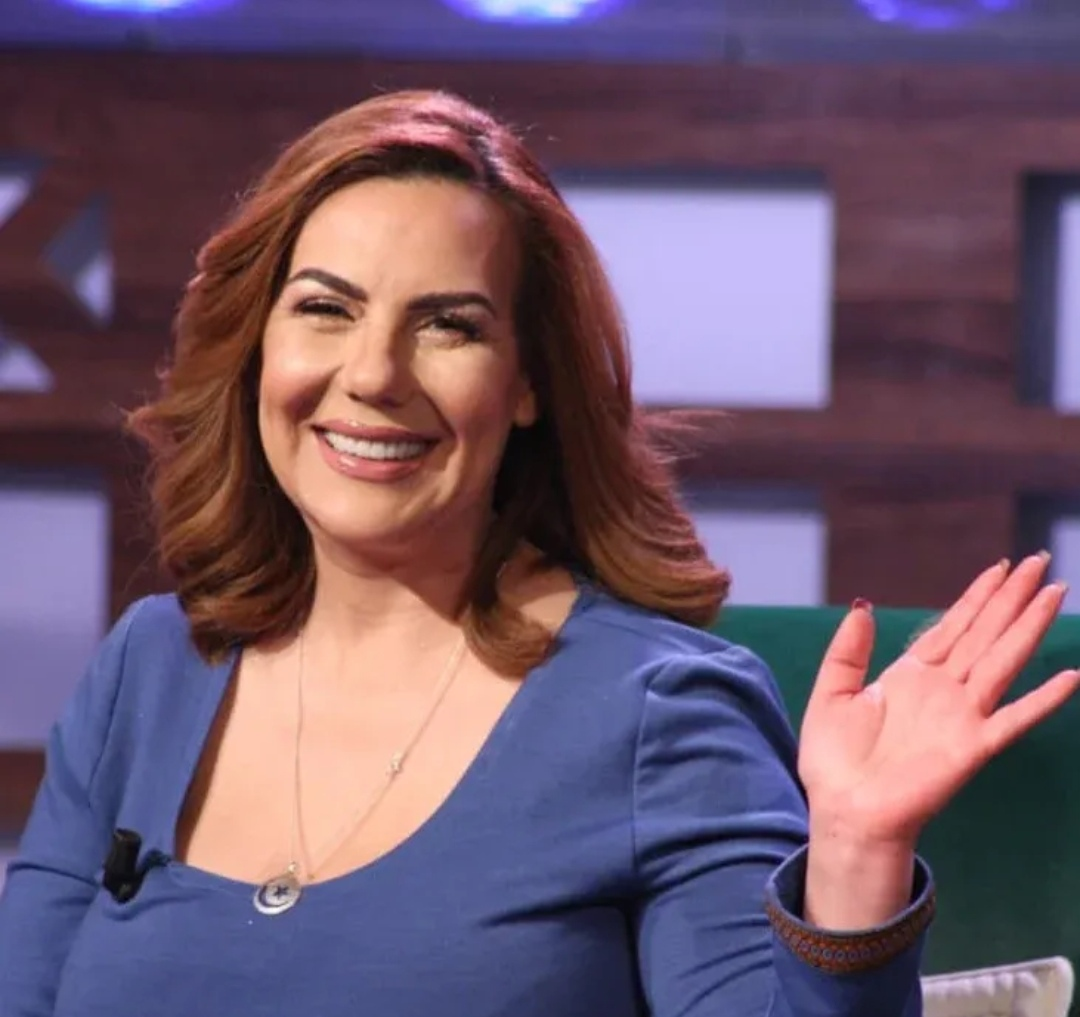
- Dridi in March 2022.
- Occupation: Actress
- Years active: 1997–present

Wahida Dridi (Arabic: وحيدة الدريدي) is a Tunisian actress.

== Filmography ==
=== Cinema ===
- 2001 : Fatma by Khaled Ghorbal
- 2004 : Parole d'hommes by Moez Kamoun
- 2005 : The Tiger and the Snow by Roberto Benigni : Salwa

=== Television ===
- 2002 : Itr Al Ghadhab by Habib Mselmani
- 2003 : Chez Azaïez by Slaheddine Essid
- 2004 : Hissabat w Aqabat by Habib Mselmani : Atef Wazzan
- 2008 : Choufli Hal (season 5) by Slaheddine Essid
- 2009 : Aqfas Bila Touyour by Ezzeddine Harbaoui
- 2011 : Portable by Habib Mselmani
- 2012 : Pour les beaux yeux de Catherine by Hamadi Arafa : Khadija
- 2012 : La Fuite de Carthage (TV movie) by Madih Belaïd
- 2013 : Zawja El Khamsa by Habib Mselmani and Jamel Eddine Khelif : Henia Burneedy alias Hannouna
- 2014 : Ikawi Saadek by Émir Majouli et Oussama Abdelkader : Kalthum
- 2014 : Maktoub (season 4) by Sami Fehri : Hedi's mother
- 2015 - 2020 : Awled Moufida by Sami Fehri : Moufida
- 2018 : Tej El Hadhra by Sami Fehri : Cherifa
- 2021 : Ouled El Ghoul by Mourad Ben Cheikh : El Kemla
- 2023: Djebel Lahmar by Rabii Tekali (guest of honor for episodes 9, 11, 12, 15 and 18–19): Fatma alias Fattouma

== Theater ==
- 2007 : Lella Echarda directed by Wahida Dridi
- 2010 : Hi artists !, text by Ba Kamane and directed by Imad Ouaslati
- 2015 : The return, text, directed by interprétation and Wahida Dridi
