= Jouda Najah =

Tunisian actress

- جودة ناجح
- Occupation: Actress
- Years active: 1996–present

Jouda Najah (Arabic: جودة ناجح) is a Tunisian actress.

== Filmography ==
=== Cinema ===
- 2004 : Casting pour un mariage (short film) by Farès Naânaâ
- 2005 : Khochkhach by Selma Baccar
- 2006 : Bin El Widyene by Khaled Barsaoui
- 2013 : Les Épines du jasmin by Rachid Ferchiou
- 2017 : El Jaida by Selma Baccar

=== Television ===
- 1996 - 1997 : El Khottab Al Bab (Suitors are on the door) (Honor guest of episodes 1, 6, 7, 10, 13, 14 and 15 of season 1 and one of the main actors of season 2) by Slaheddine Essid, Ali Louati and Monsef Beldi : Beya
- 2000 : Mnamet Aroussia by Slaheddine Essid : Béhija Azzouz
- 2002 : Talak Incha by Moncef Dhouib
- 2003 : Chams wa dhilal by Ezzedine Harbaoui
- 2003 : Ikhwa wa Zaman by Hamadi Arafa
- 2004 : Hissabat w Aqabat by Habib Mselmani
- 2008 : Choufli Hal (season 5) by Slaheddine Essid
- 2008 - 2014 : Maktoub by Sami Fehri : Jamila Néji
- 2013 - 2014 : Happy Ness by Majdi Smiri : Dalila
- 2013 : Zawja El Khamsa by Habib Mselmani and Jamel Eddine Khélif (Guest of honor of episode 9) : Faiza
- 2017 : Nsibti Laaziza (season 7) by Slaheddine Essid

=== Videos ===
- 2018 : advertising spot for the Tunisian oil brand Jadida
