= Rim El Benna =

Tunisian actress

- ريم البنا
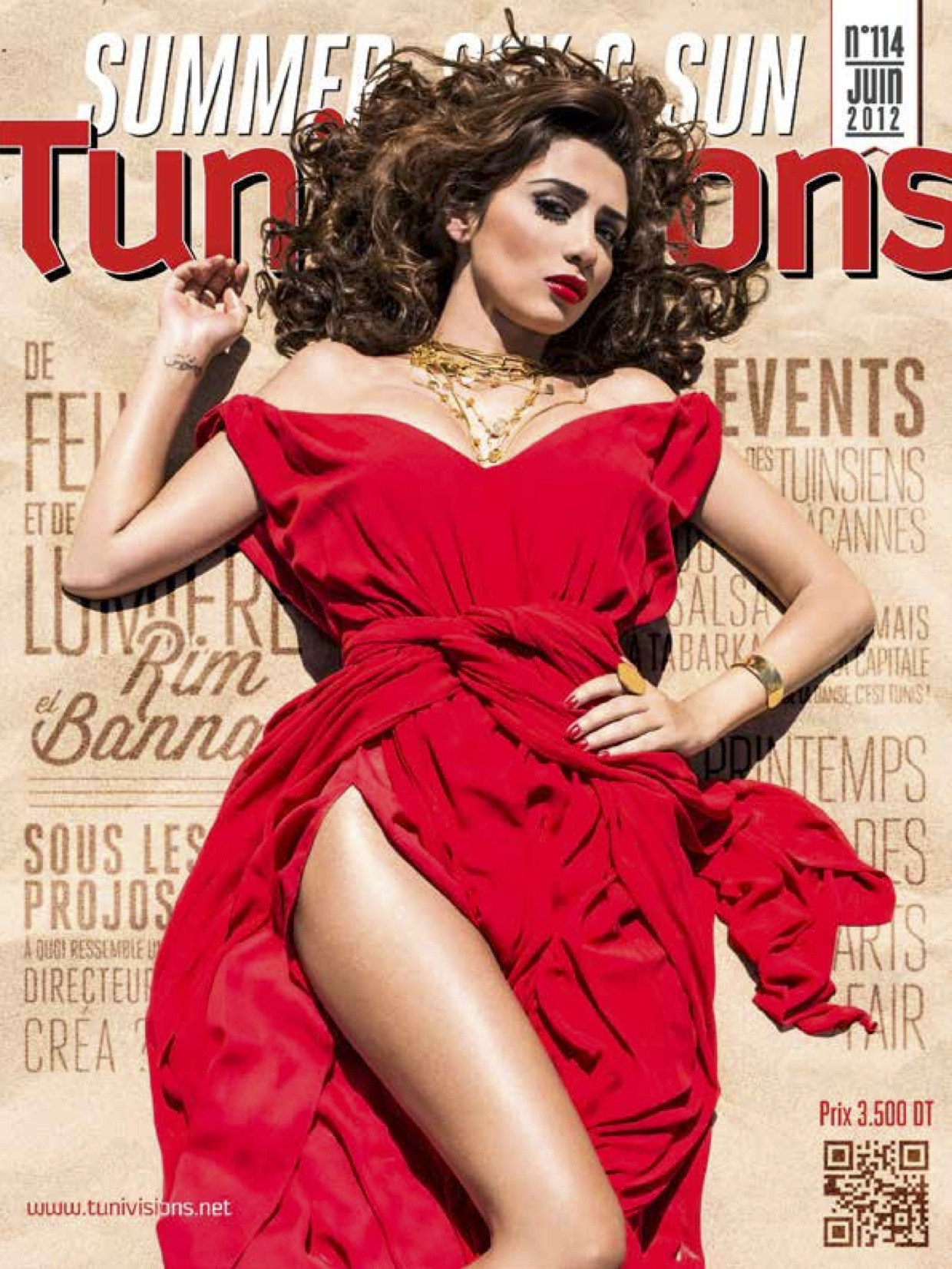
- Rim El Benna on the cover of Tunivisions, in June 2012.
- Born: 30 May 1981 (age 44); Nabeul, Tunisia
- Occupations: Actress, Model

Rim El Benna (Arabic: ريم البنا, born May 30, 1981, in Nabeul), is a Tunisian actress.

She was on the cover of Tunivisions in June 2012.

== Filmography ==
=== Feature film ===
- 2009 : Les Secrets (Arabic: الدّواحة or Dowaha) by Raja Amari : as Selma
- 2013 : Jeudi après-midi by Mohamed Damak
- 2014 : Printemps tunisien by Raja Amari

=== Short film ===
- 2010 : Adeem by Adel Serhan
- 2011 : D'Amour et d'eau fraîche by Ines Ben Othman

=== Television series ===
- 2009 : Aqfas Bila Touyour by Ezzeddine Harbaoui
- 2010 : Min Ayam Mliha by Abdelkader Jerbi
- 2017 : La Coiffeuse by Zied Litayem

=== Television film ===
- 2005 : Imperium: Saint Peter by Giulio Base, and Omar Sharif
- 2010 : Who Framed Jesus by Marc Lewis
