= Mariem Ben Chaabane =

Tunisian actress (born 1983)

- مريم بن شعبان
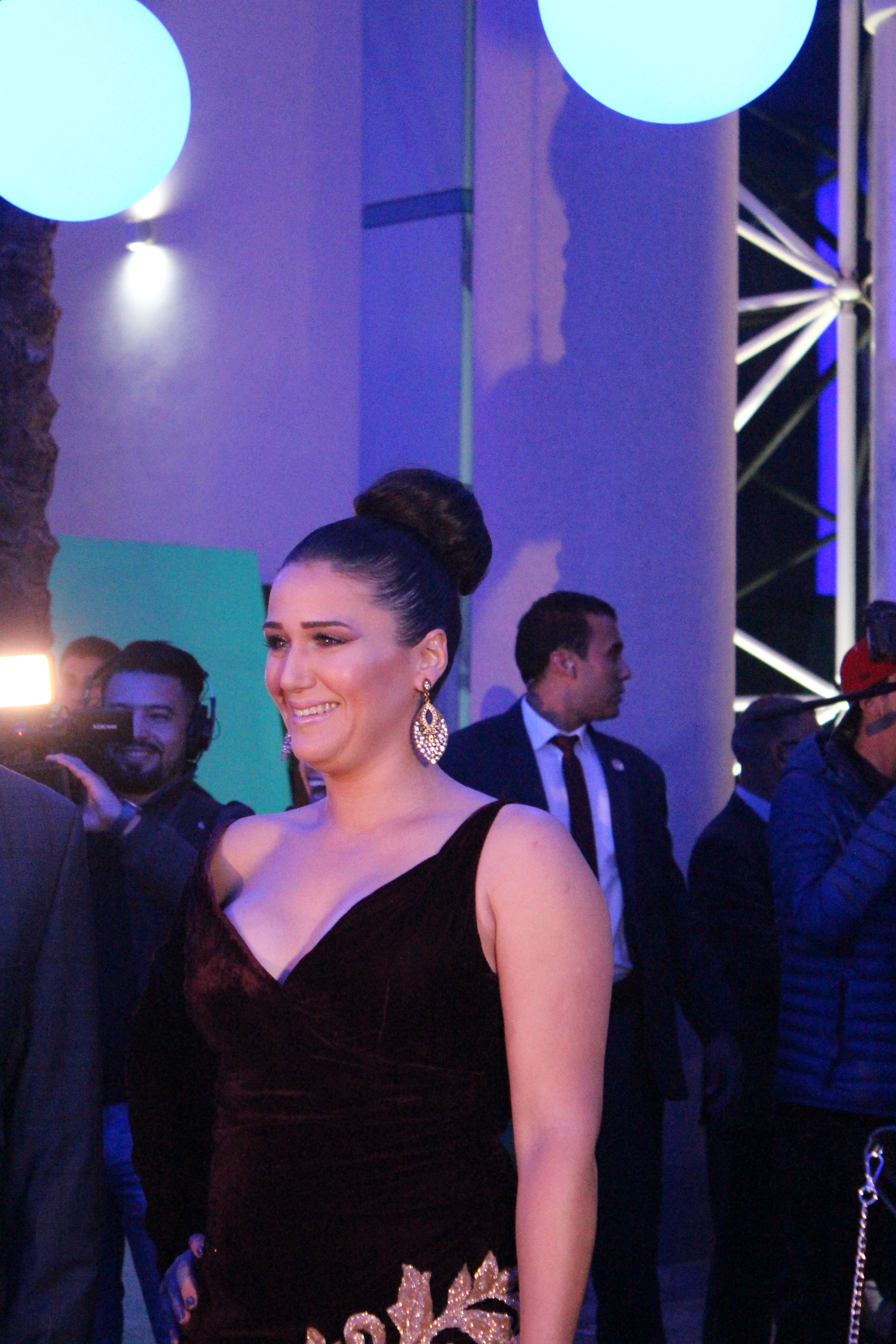
- Mariem Ben Chaabane at the opening ceremony of the Carthage Film Festival in 2018.
- Born: 30 July 1983 (age 42); Tunis, Tunisia
- Occupation: Actress
- Years active: 2007–present

Mariem Ben Chaabane (Arabic: مريم بن شعبان, born July 30, 1983) is a Tunisian actress. She is especially known for her roles in the Tunisian series Casting and Machair.

== Biography ==
Meriam Ben Chaabane was born on July 30, 1983. In 2007 she graduated from the University of Sorbonne Nouvelle Paris 3 with a bachelor's degree in performing arts theater specialty. The actress had dancing and singing Trainings as well, She has also managed theater Workshops.

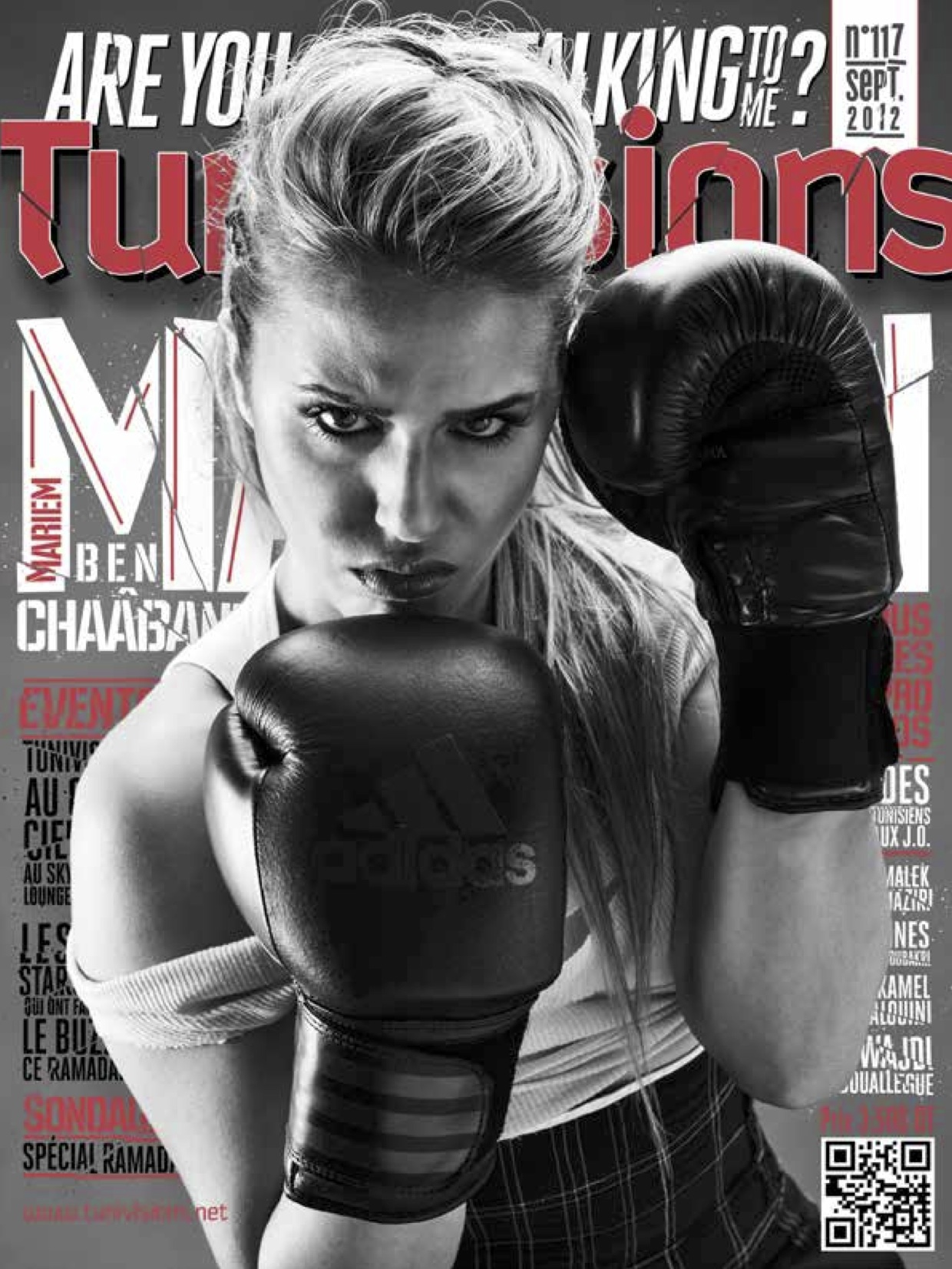
Mariem Ben Chaabane on the September 2012 cover of Tunivisions

In 2010 Mariem was discovered by Tunisians audience with her role of Dorra mnawer in the Tunisian series "Casting". Yet in 2012 she made a strong comeback with her role in the series Maktoub.

She was on the cover of the Tunivisions people magazine in September 2012.

In 2016, she starred in two series which were broadcast during the month of Ramadan, Awled Moufida and Flashback, The actress also appeared in the movie Woh! by the Tunisian director Ismahane Lahmar.

In 2019 Mariem Ben Chaabane took a leading role in the Tunisian Television series Machair by the Turkish director Muhammet Gok, she starred as Meriem "A fightful women who has brain cancer and has only a few days left to live". The series made a huge success in the Maghreb area during Ramadan 2019, Her role was admired by the Tunisian and Maghreb audience.

== Filmography ==
=== Film ===
- 2014 : Face à la mer by Sabry Bouzid
- 2016 : Woh ! by Ismahane Lahmar

=== Television ===
- 2010 : Casting by Sami Fehri : as Dorra Mnawer
- 2012 : Maktoub (3rd season) by Sami Fehri : as Chekra Ben Sallem
- 2013 : Layem by Khaled Barsaoui
- 2016 : Awled Moufida (saison 2) by Sami Fehri
- 2016-2017 : Flashback by Mourad Ben Cheikh
- 2019 : Machair (Arabic: مشاعر) by Muhammet Gök : as Meriem : Maryem Yahiya
