= Kenza Fourati =

Tunisian model (born 1987)

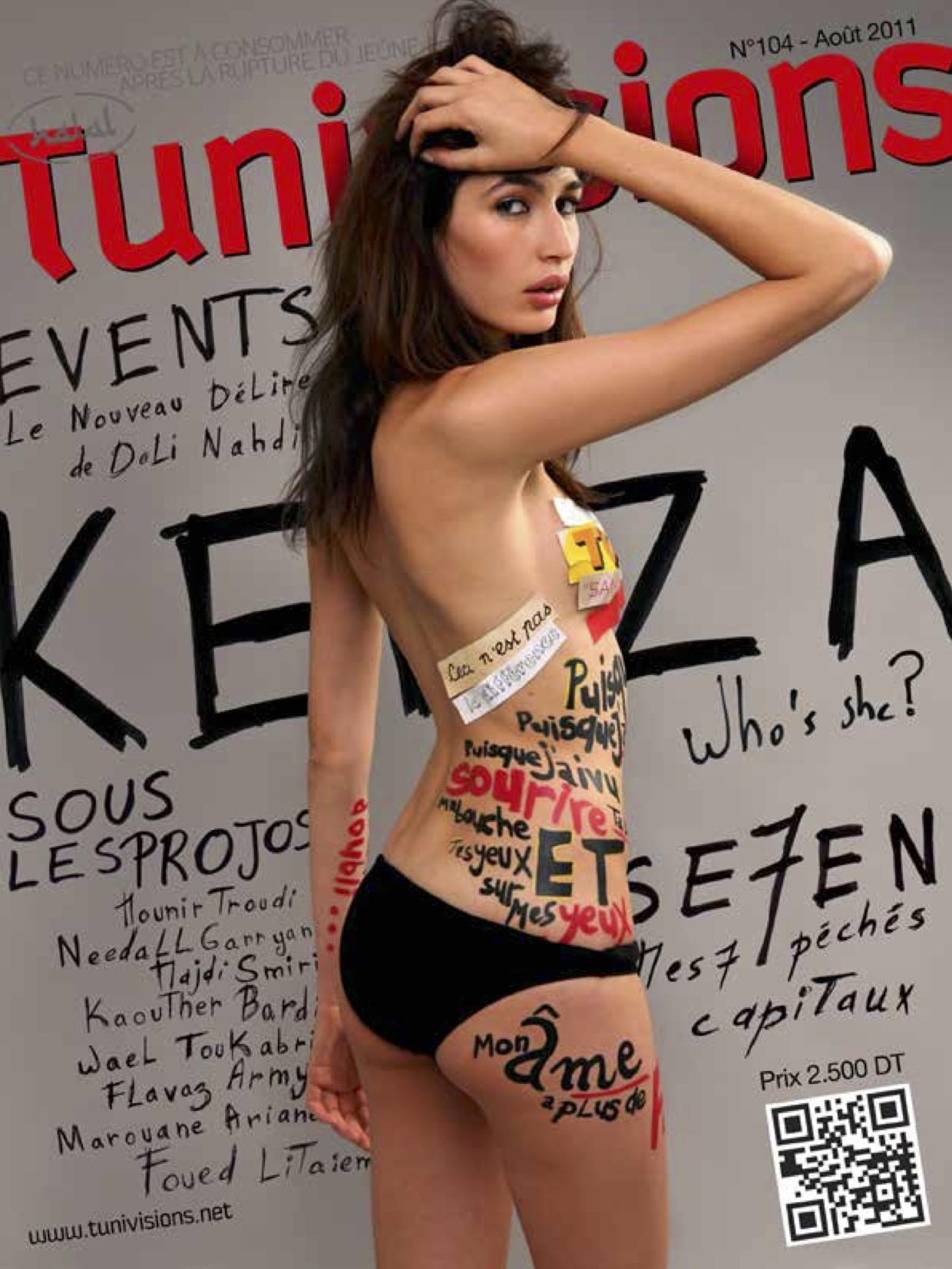
- Fourati on the cover of Tunivisions, August 2011
- Born: 13 May 1987 (age 39); Lille, France
- Citizenship: French; Tunisian
- Spouse: Ayman Mohyeldin (m. 2016)
- Children: 2
- Modelling information
- Height: 5 ft 10 in (1.78 m)
- Hair colour: Dark brown
- Eye colour: Brown
- Agency: Elite Model Management

Kenza Fourati (Arabic: كنزة الفراتي) is a Tunisian-French model.

== Early life and education ==
Fourati was born in Lille, northern France, on 13 May 1987. She moved to Tunisia with her family when she was two months old, growing up in the coastal town of La Marsa.

Fourati's mother, Dora Bouchoucha, is a film producer, and her father, Kamel Fourati, is a radiologist. Her paternal grandfather, Mohamed Fourati, was a cardiologist and a pioneer of heart transplant surgery in Tunisia. Her paternal grandmother, Michèle Roly, is French and a native of Lille. Fourati has a younger sister, Maleke, who completed a PhD in Development Economics at the UNSW Business School, in Australia.

Fourati attended a French high school in Tunisia and began modelling after graduation. Shortly thereafter, she moved to Paris, to study at the Paris-Sorbonne University. Fourati graduated with a Bachelor in Literature and Fine Arts in 2008. She then moved to London to study filmmaking at Kingston University, London where she continued modelling Fourati graduated with a master's degree in Film/Cinema/Video Studies in 2010. Fourati has said that she has wanted to become a director since she was young. She has been studying acting at the New York Film Academy since 2011.

Fourati speaks Arabic, French, English and "a little bit of Italian". She has dual French and Tunisian citizenship.

== Career ==
In 2002, Fourati finished in third place in the Elite Model Look competition at the age of 15 and signed with Elite Model Management. She has appeared in numerous international magazines, such as Vogue Paris, Elle, Marie Claire, L'Officiel Voyage, Grazia, and GQ. Fourati has walked the runway for major fashion houses, including Armani, Dior, Chanel, Jean Paul Gaultier, Céline, Gianfranco Ferré, Stella McCartney, Tommy Hilfiger, Valentino and Vivienne Westwood.

In 2005, she appeared in the French film Frankie alongside Diane Kruger. In October 2010, with Tunisian actor Dhaffer L'Abidine, Fourati co-hosted the opening and closing ceremonies of the Carthage Film Festival.

In recent years, she has been involved in advocacy with the Model Mafia and Model Alliance.

In November 2013, Fourati launched her own women's fashion line in Tunis, Tunisia. Her clothing line included a range of printed T-shirts; long, sheer dresses; and oversized, long-sleeved tops. The fashion line was designed in New York by Fourati who was assisted by a pattern-maker; and manufactured in her home country of Tunisia. The By Kenz blog is no longer available and the Facebook Fanpage has not been updated since March, 2014. She has since launched a shoe company, Osay, with Simone Carrica.

=== Sports Illustrated Swimsuit Issue, 2011 ===
Fourati appeared in the Sports Illustrated Swimsuit Issue in 2011. In an interview with Global Grind, Fourati said,

"I grew up in a Muslim culture, but I can still be a swimsuit model too! Why should the two be exclusive? It is not…I am very supported back home."

Following the Tunisian Revolution, Fourati became an advocate for artistic expression in Tunisia:

"We are at a point now in Tunisia where we are free. We should be able to portray art like this if we want to, as the extremists are allowed to express themselves, too. That is a debate that we want to create, but it must be a peaceful one."

As the first Arab Muslim model to be featured in Sports Illustrated, she raised debates in Tunisian society and abroad about what it means to be Muslim and about variety within the religion.

=== Tunivisions cover, August 2011 ===
In August 2011, during the Muslim month of Ramadhan, Fourati appeared in a bikini and body paint on the cover of Tunivisions, which created controversy. In a 2012 interview, Fourati was critical of the magazine, saying:

"Last year I shot a cover for a magazine wearing a bikini and my body was covered by a Victor Hugo poem. I loved the idea and the poem preaching love and tolerance, but the magazine edited it in an aggressively provocative way and it delivered the wrong message. So yes, that would be the only thing I would do differently. I was too naive back then."

=== Participation in the Tunisian Revolution (2010–2011) ===
Though she was living abroad at the time, Fourati participated in Tunisia's four week Jasmine Revolution that toppled President Zine El Abidine Ben Ali. The revolution which began on 18 December 2010, culminated with the flight of Ben Ali and his family on 14 January 2011. Fourati was critical of the position the French government took, saying:

"We watched other foreign countries take a stand with Tunisia and the last country to stand with us, the one we have the strongest relationship with, was France. They almost took the side of the dictator. The French politicians didn't get it at all. At that time, that action was almost like a divorce. But the press and the majority were supportive there. On the other hand, Obama said he would stand by the people fighting for their rights."

Of her involvement, Fourati said:

"When the turmoil intensified I asked my family for their permission to start publishing articles and videos connected to the subject and they allowed me to do it. They really are the brave ones because the danger was really for them. I got even more involved when my friend, who is an activist, got arrested and disappeared. His wife reached out to me and it was right at the beginning, on January 6th, 2011. I decided to stop everything that I was doing and only focus on the history that was being made in my country."

== Personal life ==
Fourati has lived in Tunisia, France, the United Kingdom and the United States. She currently resides in New York.

During a 2011 interview, Fourati compared her experience of living in France with the United States:

"If you were asking me how it is to be a Muslim in America, it's much harder to be a North African in France than to be a foreigner here in America."

Asked about her experience living in France, Fourati said:

"My grandmother is French so I was there often. I went to the French lycee (school) in Tunisia so I feel French as well. But when I moved there to live, the experience was different. I remember people suggesting to me that I shouldn't say I was from Tunisia! I found that very shocking at the time. I thought, "Why would anyone ever suggest that?" I am proud of where I come from. I didn't think twice about changing my name so I could work more."

Fourati dated the R&B singer Ryan Leslie and appeared on several of Ryan's music videos.

On 26 April 2016, Fourati married Ayman Mohyeldin, a television journalist for NBC News, in an intimate ceremony in his home state of Georgia. She shared photos from her wedding day on social media. Fourati wore an ivory bridal burnous over an ivory Balenciaga mini-dress for the ceremony in Marietta, Georgia. For photos taken in Savannah, Georgia, Fourati wore a custom Houghton "Moss" Gown.

Fourati revealed in a "Vogue Arabia" interview that she was expecting her first child with Mohyeldin, in early 2017. Their daughter, Dora, was born in New York on 12 March 2017.
