= Deal or No Deal (Tunisian game show) =

Tunisian television program

- Arabic: Dlilek Mlek دليلك ملك
- Genre: Game show
- Based on: Deal or No Deal by John de Mol Jr.
- Presented by: Sami El Fihri
- Country of origin: Tunisia
- No. of episodes: 419 (El Hiwar Ettounsi)

Production
- Running time: 50 minutes (with commercials)

Original release
- Network: Tunisie 7 (2005 – 2007); El Hiwar Ettounsi (2014 – present)
- Release: 2005 – June 2018

Deal or No Deal has a version airing in Tunisia, called Dlilek Mlek (دليلك ملك), which is broadcast on the Tunisian National television channel Tunisian TV 1 and was hosted by Sami Fehri between 2005 and 2007. It is in Arabic. The top prize was 300,000 Tunisian dinars (about US$124,000) in the first edition, 500,000 dinars (US$206,000) in the second, 1,000,000 dinars (US$412,000) in the third and current versions and 2,000,000 dinars (US$830,000) during Ramadan 2017. The lowest prize is 100 milimes (0.1 dinar, about 7¢ US). The 24 boxes represent 24 governorates of Tunisia.

The top prize was won at least once in each edition. On March 22, 2006, Mohamed Mabrouk won 300,000 dinars. On November 13, 2006, Mohamed Bashir Menchari won 500,000 dinars. And on September 13, 2007, a contestant won 1,000,000 dinars. Each winner shared the prize with an SMS participant.

Revival of the show is broadcast in every Ramadan on El Hiwar Ettounsi since 2014. In Ramadan 2017, the top prize is further increased to 2,000,000 dinars (US$824,000).

On June 13, 2017, Mrs. Aichoucha from Ben Arous won the top prize. However, the episode is under investigation by Independent High Authority for Audiovisual Communication (French: Haute autorité indépendante de la communication audiovisuelle).

On 5 March 2018 and 9 March 2018, two people won the bottom prize of 100 millimes with 5 episodes of each other.

== List of seasons ==
=== El Hiwar Ettounsi ===
Season	From	To	No. of episodes
1 (Ramadan 2014)	June 29, 2014	July 31, 2014	30
2 (Ramadan 2015)	June 18, 2015	July 19, 2015	30
3	September 14, 2015	January 5, 2016	79
4 (Ramadan 2016)	June 6, 2016	July 5, 2016	30
5	September 26, 2016	February 3, 2017	95
6 (Ramadan 2017)	May 27, 2017	June 25, 2017	30
7	January 29, 2018	June 2018	125

== Box Values ==
Left Side
1st edition	2nd and 3rd	2014	2015–2018
0.1 DT
1 DT			Joke prize 1
Joke prize 1			1 DT
10 DT
50 DT
Joke prize 2
100 DT
250 DT
Joke prize 3	500 DT
500 DT	Joke prize 3
1,000 DT
Joke prize 4		2,000 DT	Joke prize 4

Right Side
1st	2nd and 2014	3rd	2015–2017&2018	Ramadan 2017
5,000 DT
10,000 DT
15,000 DT
20,000 DT
25,000 DT
30,000 DT
50,000 DT		35,000 DT	50,000 DT
75,000 DT		50,000 DT	75,000 DT	100,000 DT
100,000 DT				200,000 DT
150,000 DT		200,000 DT		300,000 DT
200,000 DT		500,000 DT	300,000 DT	1,000,000 DT
300,000 DT	500,000 DT	1,000,000 DT		2,000,000 DT

NOTE: The lowest value is shown as 0.1 dinar on the board, but 100 millimes in box. Also, 1,000,000 dinars is written as "Milliard" (مليار), meaning "billion" in box and 2,000,000 dinars is written as "2 Milliards" (مليارات 2), meaning "2 billion".
