= Hassiba Rochdi =

Tunisian singer and actress

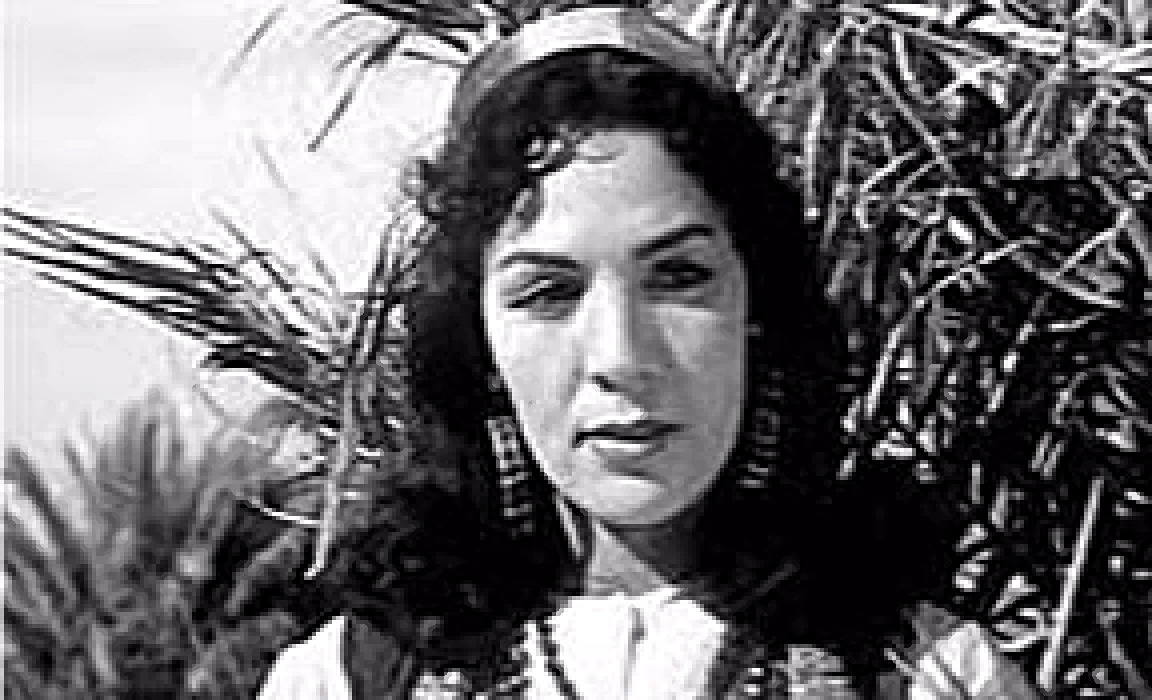
- Born: Zohra Bent Ahmed Ben Haj Abdennebi; 1918; Joumine, Tunisia
- Died: September 26, 2012 (aged 93–94); La Soukra, Tunisia
- Occupation: Singer . actress
- Notable work: La Rebelle

Hassiba Rochdi or Hassiba Rochdy (Arabic: حسيبة رشدي), born Zohra Bent Ahmed Ben Haj Abdennebi, was born in approximately 1918 in Joumine and died on September 26, 2012, in La Soukra. She was the first renowned Tunisian singer in Egypt and the first Tunisian actress to play a leading role in Egyptian films.

== Early life ==
Rochdi was the daughter of the eighth and final wife of her father. She was born into a family of property owners and spent her childhood in Mateur where she learned Bedouin songs and started learning sewing and embroidery. During this period, she was influenced by Jewish singers. Following an argument with her father over a phonograph, she left home for Bizerte. She was brought back to her father and forced to marry. However, she fled to Sfax where she was admitted to a theatrical troupe and started singing.

She became friends with singer Fethia Khaïri and met Béchir Ressaïssi, a representative of Baidaphon records, who took her to Paris to record on vinyl, producing: El-Achaga harguetli guelbi. She was accompanied by musicians including Mohamed Jamoussi and Mohamed Triki. After marrying the latter, this alliance allowed her to enter the world of professional singing. Triki formed a troupe for her, bringing together musicians such as Hédi Jouini, Ali Sriti, Kaddour Srarfi and Ibrahim Salah.

== Egyptian career ==
After divorcing Triki, she married American diplomat Henry Blake, assistant to the American consul in Tunis. She spent a few years in Brooklyn where she opened an eponymous restaurant. Contacted in Paris by supporters of the nationalist party of Neo-Destour, she was in charge of delivering documents to its leader Habib Thameur, then a refugee in Cairo. Installed in an apartment, she was welcomed by the seraglio of King Farouk and organized evenings where she met singer Sayed Chatta. He presented her to the director of the radio station in Cairo who, after an examination judged by Oum Kalthoum, gave her a weekly concert. Hassiba also performed public with tenor Mohamed Abdelmottaleb.

She starred in four films alongside great Egyptian actors: Hob (Love) by Abdelaziz Hassine (1948) Tariq Echouk (Path of thorns) by Husseïn Sedky (1950), Dim'a Fessahr'a (Blood in the Desert) by Gianni Vernuccio (1951), Intekam El Habib (Vengeance of the Lover) by Vernuccio (1952).

== Back to Tunisia ==
She returned to Tunisia and resumed her career in the 1950s, filming for television and cinema. She played roles in films such as La Rebelle (1968) and Sourakh (1972) by Omar Khlifi, Sous la pluie de l'automne (Under the rain of Autumn) (1969) by Ahmed Khchine, Khlifa le teigneux (1969) by Hamouda Ben Halima with Mouna Noureddine, Le Sultan de la médina by Moncef Dhouib (1992) and Bent Familia by Nouri Bouzid (1997). She also plays in Goha (1957) by Jacques Baratier with Omar Sharif and Claudia Cardinale.

Her popular songs include "Yalli Ouyounek fessama", "Mahlaha tadhbilat ainek", T"aht el yasmina", T"aarafni naani wtaamal belaani", "Sir ya lazrag sir", and "Jesmi Baid Alik".
