= Maryam Castle =

Castle in Kermanshah Province, Iran

- قلعه مریم

General information
- Type: Castle
- Location: Sarpol-e Zahab County, Iran

Maryam Castle (Persian: قلعه مریم) is a historical castle located in Sarpol-e Zahab County in Kermanshah Province, The longevity of this fortress dates back to the Sasanian Empire.
