= Samar Matoussi =

Tunisian actress

- Born: February 4, 1993 (age 33)
- Occupation: Actress
- Years active: 2016–present

Samar Matoussi (born February 4, 1993) is a Tunisian actress, presenter, and model who started her career in 2016.

== Filmography ==
Sources:

- Lilia, a Tunisian Girl (2016)
- Another Life (2016–2018)
- El Manda (2020)
- The Island of Forgiveness (2021)
