= Rania Gabsi =

Tunisian actress

- رانية القابسي
- Gabsi in 2018
- Born: 22 January 1988 (age 38); Tunis, Tunisia
- Occupation: actress
- Years active: 2011–present

Rania Gabsi (Arabic: رانية القابسي) (born 22 January 1988) is a Tunisian actress, most notably known for her role as Yosr in the television series Maktoub.

== Biography ==
In 2025, Gabsi graduated with a Master's degree in Didactics of Physical and Sports Activities.

== Filmography ==
=== Films ===
- 2011: Or noir by Jean-Jacques Annaud
- 2012: Millefeuille by Nouri Bouzid: Fatma
- 2014: El Ziara, la lune noire by Nawfel Saheb-Ettaba

=== Television ===
==== Series ====
- 2008-2014: Maktoub by Sami Fehri: Yosr Ben Salah
- 2014-2015: School by Zied Litayem: Mayssa
- 2016: Warda w Kteb d'Ahmed Rjeb: Karima
- 2020: Awled Moufida by Sami Fehri
- 2022: Baraa by Mourad Ben Cheikh and Sami Fehri

==== Broadcasts ====
- 2012: Le Crocodile (episode 22) on Ettounsiya TV
- 2012: Café'IN sur Tunisna TV: host
- 2014: Maândek Win Tohreb (episode 11) with Tunisna TV
- 2015: Dbara Tounsia (episode 27) with Ettounsiya TV
- 2017: 360° with Hédi Zaiem with El Hiwar El Tounsi
- 2018:
  - Media police on Tunisna TV
  - Fekret Sami Fehri with Hédi Zaiem on El Hiwar El Tounsi

==== Videos ====
- 2017: Bikch (clip) by Walid Nahdi, directed by Mohamed Ali Nahdi
