= Myriem Nacer =

Algerian footballer (born 2002)

Personal information
- Date of birth: 15 February 2002 (age 24)
- Place of birth: Lambres-lez-Douai, France
- Position: Midfielder

Team information
- Current team: RC Lens
- Number: 10

Youth career
- 2008–2013: Les Épis Foot
- 2013–2016: Douaisis FF
- 2016–2017: SC Douai
- 2017–2019: Arras

Senior career*
Years	Team	Apps	(Gls)
2019–2020	Arras FC	6	(0)
2020–2024	RC Lens	55	(2)
2024–	Roubaix Wervicq	0	(0)

International career^{‡}
2015	France U16	5	(1)
2018	France U17	3	(0)
2022	France U20	1	(0)
2023–	Algeria	1	(0)
- * Club domestic league appearances and goals as of 26 May 2024 ‡ National team caps and goals as of 3 June 2024

Myriem Nacer (Arabic: مريم ناصر; born 15 February 2002) is a professional footballer who plays as a midfielder for Seconde Ligue club RC Lens. Born in France, she represents the Algeria national team.

== Club career ==
On 20 June 2024, Lens announced Nacer's departure from the team. On 27 June 2024, she signed with Division 3 Féminine side Roubaix Wervicq.

== International career ==
=== Youth career ===
Nacer is a former French youth international, having earned caps with the women's under-16, under-17, and under-20 national teams. She participated in friendlies with the U16 and U20 teams and competed in the 2019 UEFA Women's Under-17 Championship qualification with France, which they didn't qualify for the final tournament.

=== Senior career ===
In February 2023, following the appointment of Farid Benstiti as Algeria's head coach, Nacer was called up to the senior team for a training camp in Sidi Moussa. In July 2024, She was called again for a double header against Senegal.

== Career statistics ==
=== Club ===
As of match played 26 May 2024

Appearances and goals by club, season and competition
Club	Season	League			Cup		Continental		Other		Total	
Club	Season	Division	Apps	Goals	Apps	Goals	Apps	Goals	Apps	Goals	Apps	Goals
Arras FC	2019–2020	Seconde Ligue	3	0	3	0	—		—		6	0
RC Lens	2020–21	Seconde Ligue	2	0	—		—		—		2	0
RC Lens	2021–22	Seconde Ligue	17	0	3	2	—		—		20	2
RC Lens	2022–23	Seconde Ligue	17	0	2	0	—		—		19	0
RC Lens	2023–24	Seconde Ligue	6	0	2	0	—		—		8	0
RC Lens	Total		45	0	10	2	—		—		55	2
Career total			45	0	10	2	—		—		55	2
