= Mériem Bouatoura =

Mériem Bouattoura
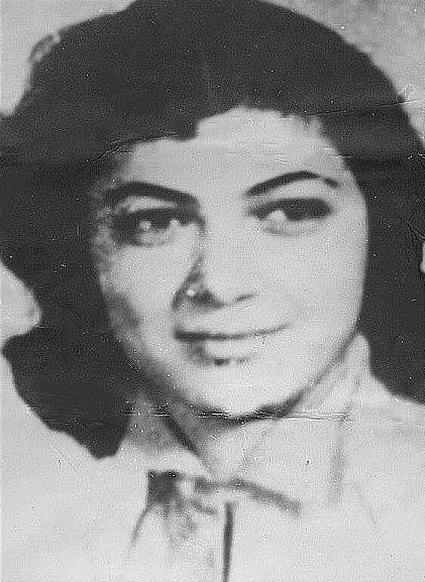
- Born: January 17, 1938
- Died: June 8, 1960 (aged 22); Constantine, Algeria
- Other name: Yasmina

Meriem Bouattoura (17 January 1938 – 8 June 1960), nicknamed Yasmina, was a freedom fighter of the war of Algeria. She was born in N'Gaous (a wilaya of Batna) and died in Constantine.

== Biography ==
=== Family and childhood ===
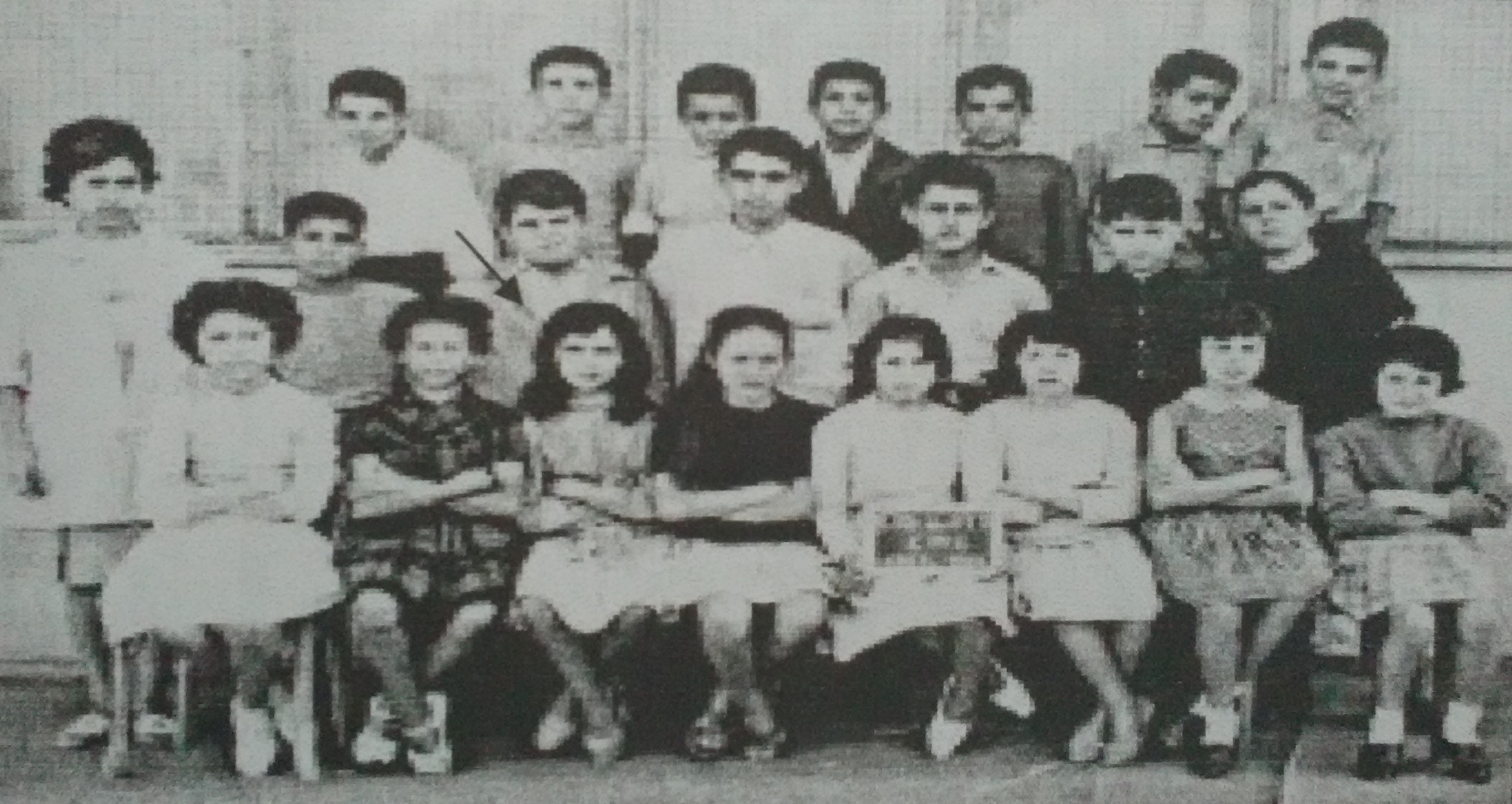
Meriem Bouatoura, as a student in Setif.

Bouatoura comes from a rich family that cultivated land of the Machu Banou Ifren of N'Gaous. Nicknamed Yasmina, Meriem Bouatoura's mother was called Yamina and her father was Abdelkadeher. She grew up in a big family with three sisters and three brothers (Lila Hanifa, Houria, Janina, Nour Eddin, Salah Eddin, Mohamed El Aid).

=== Beginning of the war of independence ===
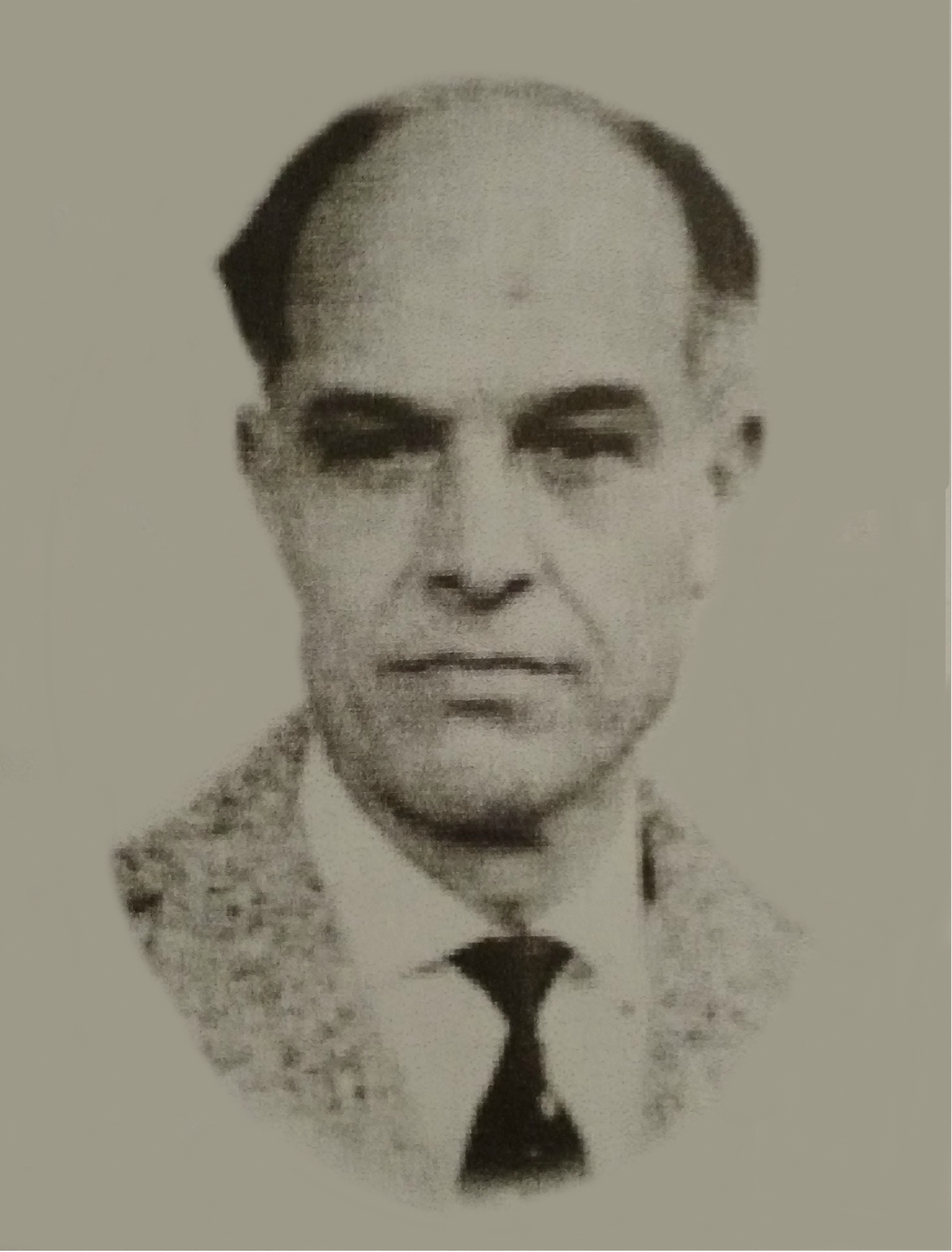
Abdelkader, father of Meriem Bouatoura

Meriem Bouatoura, then a high school student, responded to the strike call of 19 May 1956 with several high school students in Setif. Subsequently, Fatima Bensamra, Houria Mostefai, Malika Kharchi and Meriem Bouatoura joined the French resistance movement during World War II, thus forming one of the first groups for the armed struggle composed of high school girls; his sister Leila helped them too. The French police launched an investigation into the causes of students dropping out of school, she constantly questioned her family to find out the reasons that led her to leave school. In December 1956, Meriem Bouatoura joined the maquis without notifying her family, but she did do so later by sending a letter to her father. She made a first visit to Tachouda where she stayed for ten days and was later joined by seven other girls. Thus, they formed the first group composed of Ziza Massika, Meriem Bouatoura, Samia Keraguel, Malika Kharchi, Fatima Bensamra, Houria Mostefai, Khadra Bellami, Aicha Guenifi, Kheira Zerouki, Zoubida Zerrouk, Yamina Cherrad, Leila Moussaoui by Jijel and Samia Maiza.

== Death ==
According to Mohammed Harbi, she was hit in Constantine by a French army tank shell. Some sources indicate that she was taken alive to the hospital in that city, where she was allegedly killed by an injection; according to Fatima Zohra Boudjeriou, before dying she shouted "Long live free and independent Algeria, down with colonialism!".
