= Narcissus (2015 film) =

- Film poster
- Arabic: عزيز روحو
- Directed by: Sonia Chamkhi
- Production companies: Amilcar Films; Moustaches Production
- Release date: November 2015 (Carthage)
- Running time: 90 minutes
- Country: Tunisia

Narcissus (Arabic: عزيز روحو, romanized: Aziz Rouhou) is a Tunisian film directed by Sonia Chamkhi, released in 2015.

== Synopsis ==
Hind, a 30-year-old young comedian, plays the leading role in a theatrical play directed by her husband Taoufik. The play is inspired by the tragic experience of Hind and her younger brother, Mehdi, who's a famous bisexual singer. Both were oppressed by their older brother, a young delinquent man who got involved in religious fundamentalism.

While Mehdi is torn between his clandestine love and the prospect of getting married, Hind decides to confront her present and reveal the buried secret of the past. She realises that in order to be able to live, she needs to break the vicious circle that kept her trapped in resentment, the frustration of others and their violence.
