= Ismahane Lahmar =

Franco-Tunisian filmmaker

- Born: Ismahane Lahmar; October 25, 1982 (age 43); Paris, France
- Education: University of Paris XII
- Occupations: Director, screenwriter
- Years active: 2008–present

Ismahane Lahmar (born 25 October 1982), is a Franco–Tunisian filmmaker and screenwriter. She is best known as the director of critically acclaimed shorts and feature films Rainbow, WOH! and Breaking News.

== Personal life ==
She was born on 25 October 1982 in Paris, France, to Tunisian parents. However, she moved to Tunisia after birth and lived with her grandparents until age eight. Then she returned to France.

== Career ==
After returning to France, she was enrolled to University of Paris XII to study economics. After completing the degree in Economics and Management, she moved to study Foreign Languages with her sister. In the middle of the university year, she went on a trip to Canada and joined a singer friend on a tour of Quebec. During this period, she started film direction.

He trained acting and drama at the Superior School of Audiovisual Production (ESRA) in Paris. Later she moved to New York University and obtained her master's degree in directing. In 2008, she made her directorial debut with the short film Red Hope in 2008. The she wrote the screenplay for the feature film Al Yasmine with the support by the Dubai Film Connection workshop.

In 2010, she decided to go to Tunisia, with the feature film Under the Elbow. However, she withdrew the decision due to the political upheaval in the country. In 2014, she directed her second short film Rainbow. It was presented in July 2014 at the Rares & Tunisiens Cycle. In 2016, she wrote and directed the film Woh, a Tunisian comedy financed by the Tunisian public. In 2019 she founded the production company 'Madame Prod' in which she develops and supports projects for women and genre cinema.

== Filmography ==
Year	Film	Role	Genre	Ref.
2008	On Your Grave	Producer	Short film	
2012	Mon 14	Director	Documentary	
2013	Get Married	Director, writer	Short film	
2015	Rainbow	Director, writer	Short film	
2016	WOH!	Director, writer	Film	
2018	Breaking News	Director, writer	Short film	
