= Miriam (disambiguation) =

Miriam was the sister of Moses in the Bible.

Miriam, Mirriam or Myriam (the French variant) may also refer to:

== People and fictional characters ==
- Miriam (given name), including a list of people, biblical, apocryphal and fictional characters
- Miriam, pen name of Zenon Przesmycki (1861–1944), Polish poet, translator and art critic
- Miriam Yeung, stage name of Yeung Chin-wah (楊千嬅, born 1974), Hong Kong singer-actress
- Myriam Montemayor Cruz (born 1981), better known as Myriam, Mexican recording artist
- Myriam François, pseudonym of Emilie François (born 1983), British writer, broadcaster, and academic; former actress
- Miriam Rivera (1981–2019), known as Miriam, Mexican transgender woman who featured in reality television shows
- Miriam Yeung (born 1974), Cantopop singer sometimes known as just Miriam
- Elena Yparraguirre (born 1947), also known as Miriam, Peruvian imprisoned revolutionary
- Marie Myriam (born 1957), French singer

== In music ==
- Myriam (Myriam album)
- Myriam (Myriam Faris album)
- Mirriam, an album by Jessi Colter

== In science ==
- 102 Miriam, an asteroid
- Minimum Information Required in the Annotation of Models (MIRIAM), an effort to standardise the annotation and curation process of quantitative models of biological systems

== Other uses ==
- Hurricane Miriam (disambiguation), six tropical cyclones in the Eastern Pacific Ocean
- "Miriam" (short story), by Truman Capote
- Miriam (film), a 1957 Finnish film
- Miryam (film), a 1929 Italian silent film
- Meriam language, also spelled Miriam, spoken by the people of several islands in the Torres Strait, Queensland, Australia
- Miriam Hospital, a private, not-for-profit hospital in Providence, Rhode Island
- Miriam College, Quezon City, Philippines, a Catholic school for girls and young women

== See also ==
- Hurricane Joan–Miriam, a 1988 hurricane that struck the Caribbean and Central America
- Maryam (disambiguation)
- Mariam (disambiguation)
