= Oulaya =

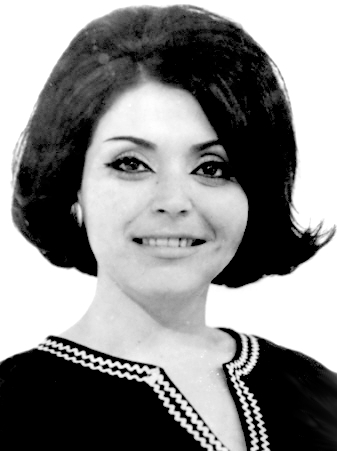

Background information
- Birth name: Beya Bent Béchir Ben Hédi Rahal
- Born: November 4, 1936 Tunis, Tunisia
- Died: March 19, 1990 (aged 53)
- Occupation: singer
- Years active: 1950–1990

Oulaya (Arabic: علية; 4 November 1936 – 19 March 1990), born "Beya Bent Béchir Ben Hédi Rahal", was a Tunisian singer and actress.

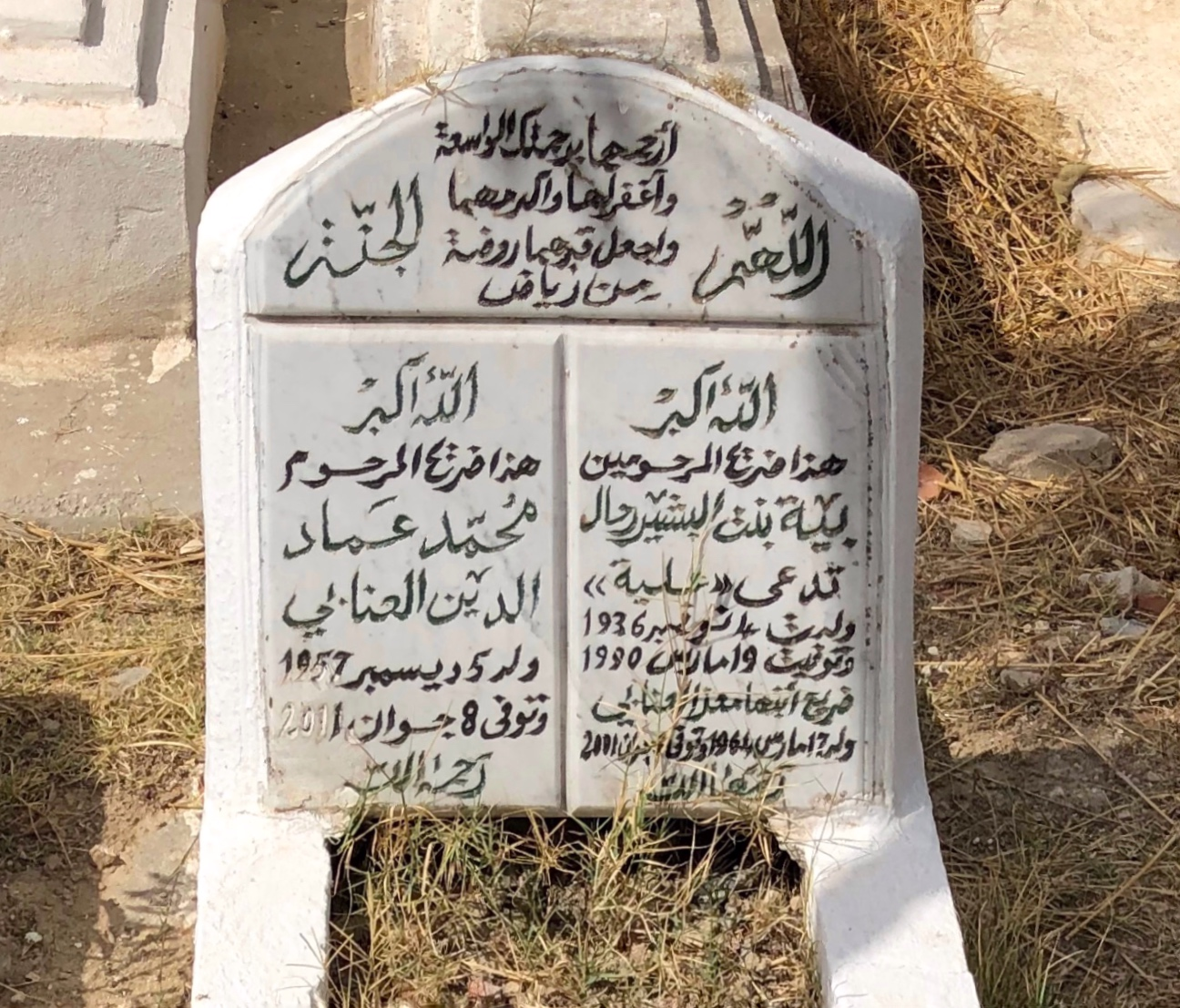
Oulaya's tomb
