= Maryam Yakubova (educator) =

Maryam Yaqubova
- Born: 12 May 1931; Urgench, Uzbek SSR, Soviet Union
- Died: 10 April 2018
- Occupation: Educator

Maryam Yakubova (Uzbek: Maryam Yoqubova) (12 May 1931 — 10 April 2018) was an Uzbek teacher.

== Biography ==
Yakubova won top honors for her academic achievements while in secondary school, from which she graduated in 1948. She studied school No.1 in Urgench. She graduated with honors from the Khorezm Pedagogical State Institute with a degree in specialty teacher of mathematics, physics in 1952, whereupon she returned to her native school No. 1 Urgench city. There she began working as a teacher of mathematics physics, continuing until 1958. In that year she was named the head of the Urgench city department of public education, continuing in the position until 1962, when she became the director of health boarding school No. 94 Urgench city. This post she held until 1992.

Yakubova received numerous awards during her career for her services to education. In 1958 she was named an Honored Professor of Public Education in the Uzbek SSR, and in 1959 she won the state prize for Excellence in Public Education of Uzbekistan. In 1960 she was awarded the Order of the Badge of Honor, and in 1966 she received the Order of Lenin. In 1970, Yakubova received the Medal of Jubilee and in 1978 she was named an Honored Teacher of Uzbekistan. In 1986 she was named a People's Teacher of the USSR. In 1991 she was honored with an Independence of Uzbekistan commemorative plaque, and in 2016 received an award for 25 years of the Independence of Uzbekistan commemorative plaque. For her accomplishments she also received the Order of the Presidium of the Uzbek SSR, among other decorations.

== Awards ==
- Honored Worker of National Education of Uzbekistan (1959)
- The Order of the Badge of Honor (1960)
- The Order of Lenin (1966)
- The Medal of Jubilee (1970)
- Honored Teacher of Uzbekistan (1978)
- People's Teacher of the USSR (1986)
- Honored with an Independence of Uzbekistan commemorative plaque (1991)
- 25 years of the Independence of Uzbekistan commemorative plaque (2016)
