= Nada Mezni Hafaiedh =

Tunisian film director (born 1984)

- Born: Saudi Arabia
- Education: Mel Hoppenheim School of Cinema
- Occupation: film director
- Known for: tearing down taboo, and touching on fundamental issues that are related with freedom.

Nada Mezni Hafaiedh (Arabic: ندى المازني حفيظ), born on May 6, 1984, in Saudi Arabia, is a Tunisian director.

== Biography ==
Nada Mezni Hafaiedh is a Tunisian film director born in Saudi Arabia. She was, from an early age, exposed to different cultures due to her diplomatic parents. Saudi Arabia, US, France, and Canada represent a pool of developments of her passion for cinema.

At the age of ten, her hobby was already assumed. She used to produce amateur films and video clips by putting her friends and family as actors. She went to Montreal to finish her studies in business administration at McGill University, but soon changed her curriculum to follow her passion for filmmaking. Graduated from Mel Hoppenheim School of Cinema, she directed several shorts films, which will be fast appreciated by the Canadian community.

She is known for tearing down taboo, and touching on fundamental issues that are related with freedom. She is also known for directing her films in a kind of realism by shooting them in a very spontaneous way.

On her return in her country of origin, Tunisia in 2009, she opened her production company Leyth Production where she decided to realize her first feature film. What is more intense than producing a map of Tunisian society Histoires Tunisiennes 2011 (Tunisians Stories), that has been the first film released after the revolution. The film made several festivals and received awards. Its international premier was at Luxor African Film Festival. She also wrote and directed a serie version of the film Histoires Tunisiennes (Hkayet Tunisia) for a Tunisian private channel of television El Hiwar El Tounsi in 2015. In 2017, she released Upon the Shadow (Au-delà de l’ombre) a documentary that expresses how much difficult is to grow and protect your sexual freedom in a homophobic society where it is taboo or strongly disparaged.

In 2023, the film Take my Breath, which she directed, addresses the topic of intersexuality in Tunisia. The director collaborated with Emna Arfaoui, an intersex person who underwent an unwanted operation at the age of six.
