= El Hiwar Et Tounsi =

Tunisian television channel

El Hiwar El Tounsi الحوار التونسي
- Country: Tunisia
- Broadcast area: Tunisia; Middle East; North Africa; European Union
- Headquarters: Tunis, Tunisia

Programming
- Language: Arabic

Ownership
- Owner: Sami Fehri

History
- Launched: May 2003

El Hiwar Et Tounsi ("Tunisian Dialogue") is a television station in Tunisia. In March 2015 it was the most widely watched television channel in Tunisia, with a 26.7% market share.

The channel was launched in 2003 by Tahar Ben Hassin, a left-wing émigré in Paris, as an unlicensed satellite station broadcasting political programmes opposed to the Ben Ali regime. After the Tunisian Revolution the channel relocated to the Manouba suburb of Tunis, switching to digital terrestrial broadcast and gradually becoming a mainstream television channel. In 2014 the founder sold the channel to a group of investors headed by Zamel Fehri and Aziz Jemal.

The channel's logo changes color to the sky blue characteristic of Ettounsiya TV, which Fehri transferred to Slim Riahi.

Notable Productions: Awled Moufida, Denya Okhra
