= Tunivisions =

Tunisian people magazine

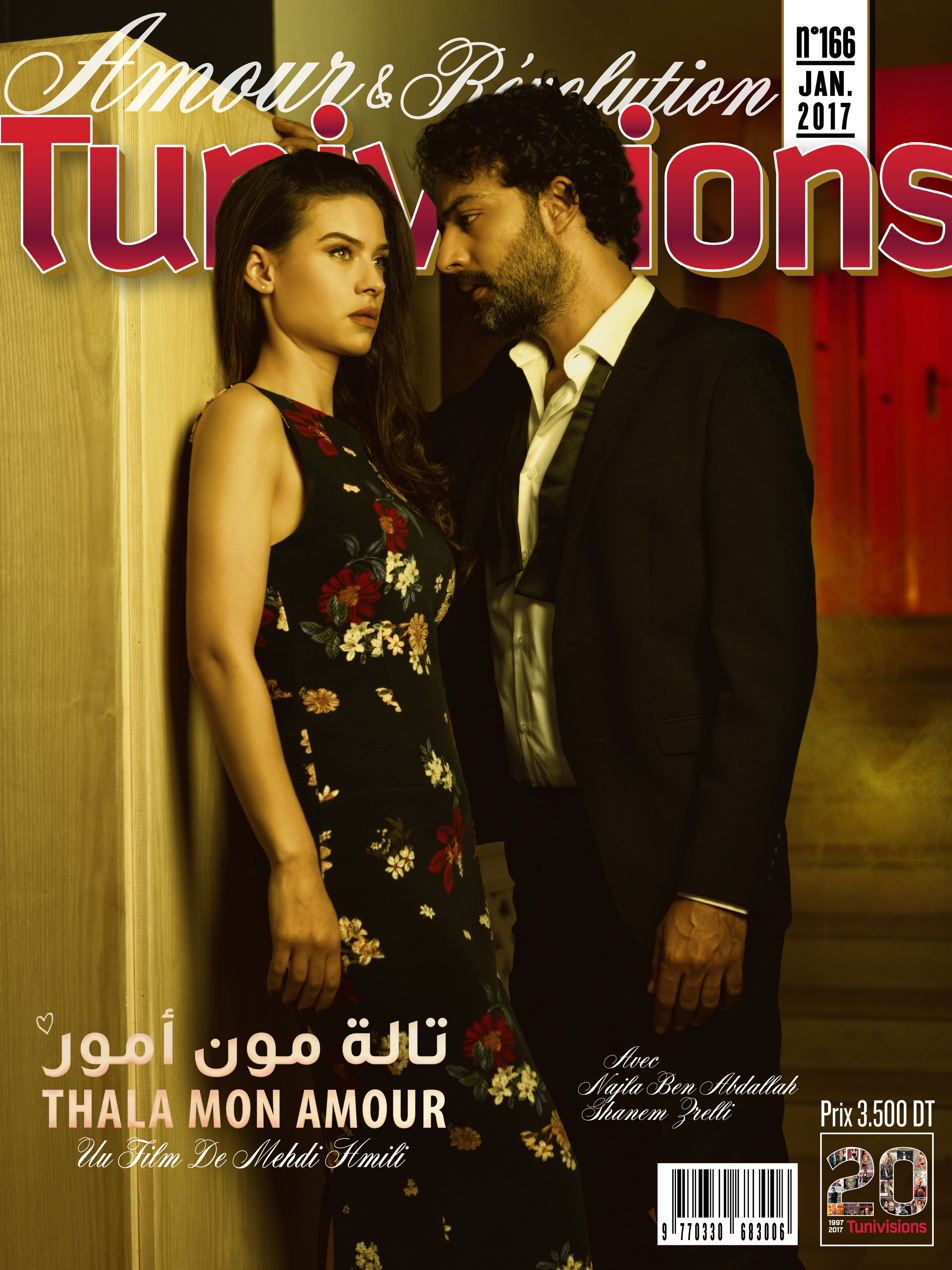
- Najla Ben Abdallah and Ghanem Zrelli on the cover of Tunivisons
- Categories: Press people
- Founded: Jalel Jedy
- First issue: 1997
- Country: Tunisia
- Language: French, Arabic
- Website: tunivisions.net

Tunivisions is a Tunisian magazine attached to the press people.

== History ==
Tunivisions is a Tunisian monthly fashion and lifestyle magazine covering many topics including fashion, beauty, culture, living, and runway based in Tunisia, first published based in Tunis in 1997 by Jalel Jedy.

In 2006, it was republished by journalist Kaïs Ben Mrad, under the aegis of Réalités magazine.

In 2009, Nizar Chaari bought it and focused his editorial line on the Tunisian people.

The magazine is published on the first Saturday of the month and sold in newsstands at 3,500 dinars.
