= Sami Fehri =

Tunisian television host, producer and director

- سامي الفهري
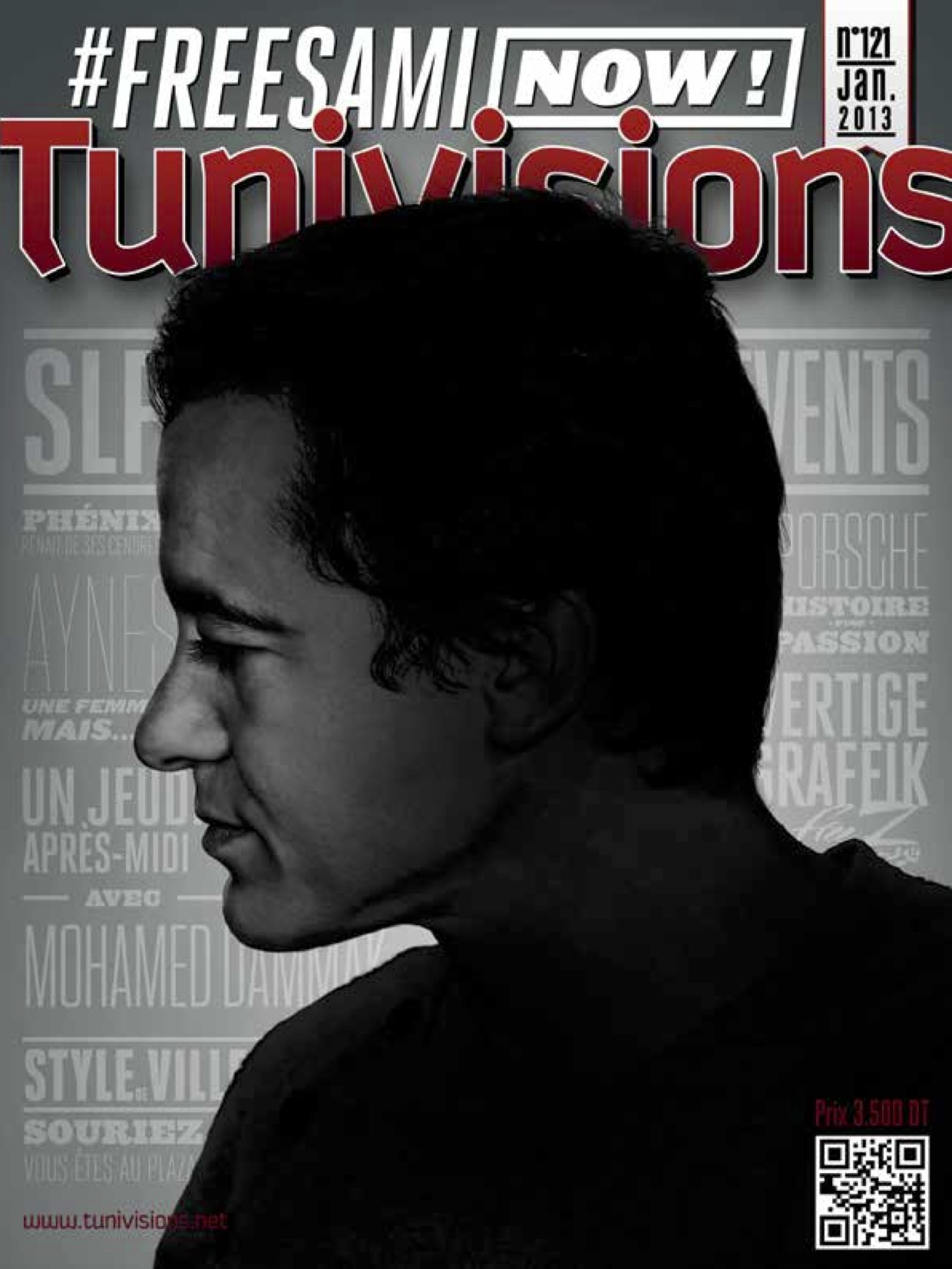
- Sami Fehri on the January 2013 cover of Tunivisions.
- Born: 7 November 1971 (age 54); La Marsa, Tunisia
- Occupations: Television producer, Television presenter, Film director
- Years active: 1997–2021(incarcerated)
- Spouse: Asma Fehri
- Children: 2

Sami Fehri (Arabic: سامي الفهري, born in Tunisia, on November 7, 1971) is a Tunisian entrepreneur, producer and director. He is also the founder of the private Tunisian channel “Ettounsiya TV” and the general director of the private production Company Cactus Production.

== Career ==
Sami Fehri started his career in the media industry during the 1990s while he worked as a radio host at RTCI.

Sami Fehri launched Cactus Productions -a private production company- in partnership with Belhassen Trabelsi the brother in law of the former Tunisian President Zine El Abidine Ben Ali. Cactus productions amassed large amounts of commercial receipts during that time.

Through Cactus productions, Fehri produced several TV shows such as “Dlilek Mlak” the Tunisian adaptation of “Deal or no Deal” along with drama series such as Awled Moufida.

Fehri created his own channel known as Ettounsiya TV in March 2011, after the Tunisian Revolution.

== Controversy and prosecution ==
During the Tunisian revolution, Sami Fehri hosted a talk show in which he supported the “new freedom” granted by the former Tunisian president Zine El Abidine Ben Ali. In this talk show, Fehri displayed scenes of jubilation in the symbolic Bourguiba Avenue where manifestations against the old regime occurred.

In 2012, Fehri faced corruption charges and was arrested upon allegations of “the illicit use of the Tunisian Television Establishment's resources". "I will go to prison with dignity," said Sami Fahri, during his interview with Express FM. His lawyers claimed their client was unfairly prosecuted for the broadcast of “The Political Logic”, a satirical show that mocked Tunisian power figures, such as President Moncef Marzouki, leader of the Islamic Party Ennahda, Rached Ghanouchi and prime minister Hamadi Jebali. The programme was later taken off air.

The National Union of Tunisian Journalists (The SNJT) issued a statement, in which they condemned the imprisonment of Sami Fehri, and accused authorities of "serious intervention of the government in media affairs."

In 2013, Fehri was released after spending one year in prison but remained on trial for two different cases. One of these cases concerns his involvement with Belhassen Trabelsi.

On October 29, 2019, the public prosecutor ordered a travel ban against Sami Fehri. On November 5, the prosecutor issued a decision for a five-day detention of him as the judicial administrator of the Cactus company. The following day, police authorities conducted searches at his home and the homes of his relatives.

On March 9, 2021, he was sentenced to eight years in prison and fined forty million dinars.

== Personal life ==
He is married to Asma Ben Jemaii, the CEO of El Hiwar Ettounsi.
