= Mouna Noureddine =

Tunisian actress

- منى نور الدين
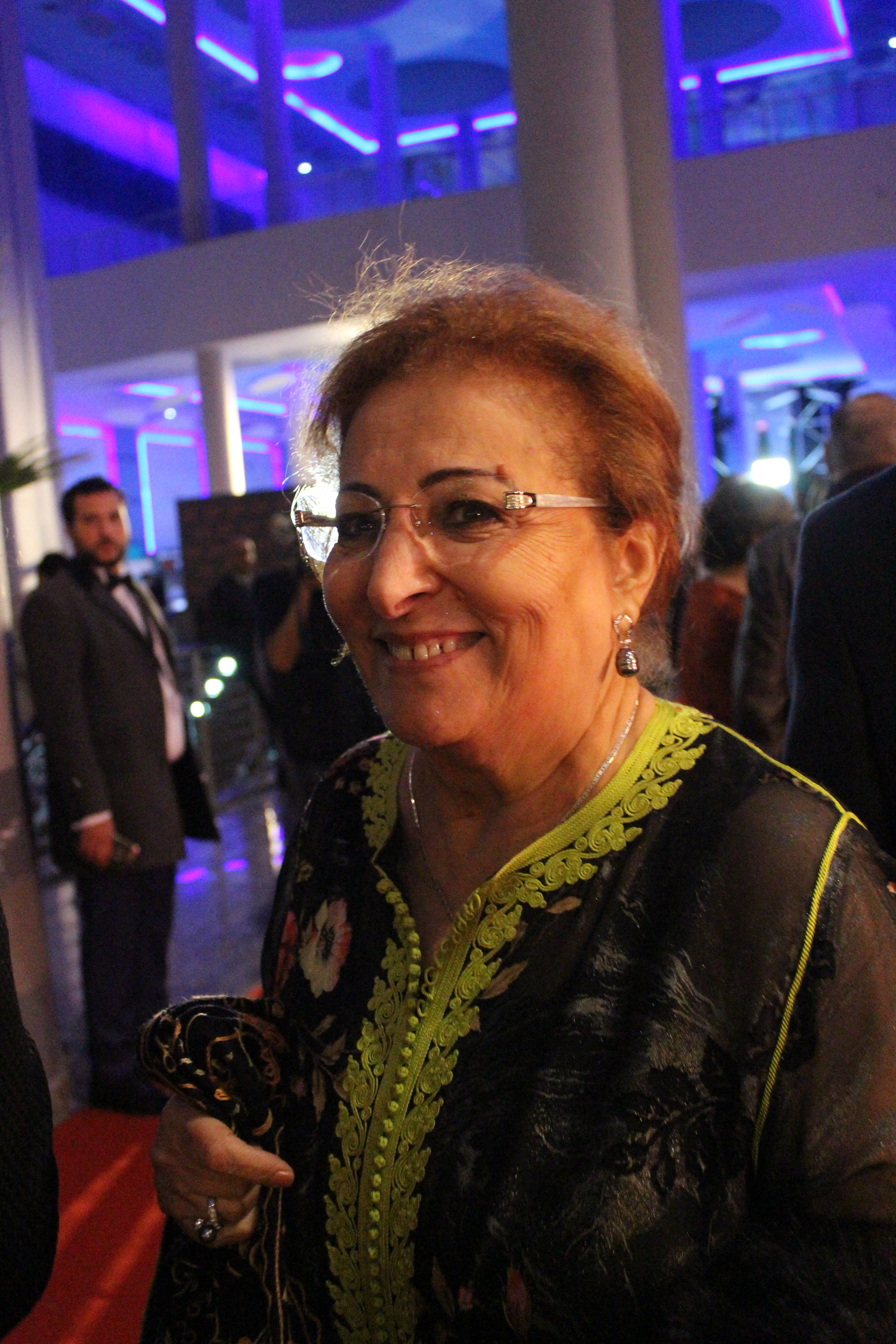
- Noureddine in 2018
- Born: Saâdia Oueslati; 23 January 1937 (age 89); Tunis, Tunisia
- Occupation: Actress
- Years active: 1954–present
- Notable work: The Season of Men
- Spouse: Noureddine Kasbaoui (died)
- Children: 6

Saadia Oueslati (Arabic: سعدية الوسلاتي, born 23 January 1937), known professionally as Mouna Noureddine, is a Tunisian actress.

The pseudonym of Mouna Noureddine was suggested by Mohamed Hedi Remnissi, an artist working in the theater of Bizerte.

== Biography ==
=== Early life ===
Noureddine studied in the elementary school of Muslim girls in Hammam-Lif. During this period, she was part of a local theatre troupe called "Ennahdha ettamthilia" (the student rise). She got her degree in 1952 and enrolled in the schoolteachers college of Tunis. Two years later, she switched to the Arabic theatre school of Tunis.

At the age of fifteen, Noureddine, while still a student, meets during the rehearsals of The Merchant of Venice by William Shakespeare the young comedian Noureddine Kasbaoui to whom she gets married later. Mouna Noureddine gave birth to two boys and four girls In 1954, she worked in the municipal Arabic theatre troupe directed by Zeki Touleïmat.

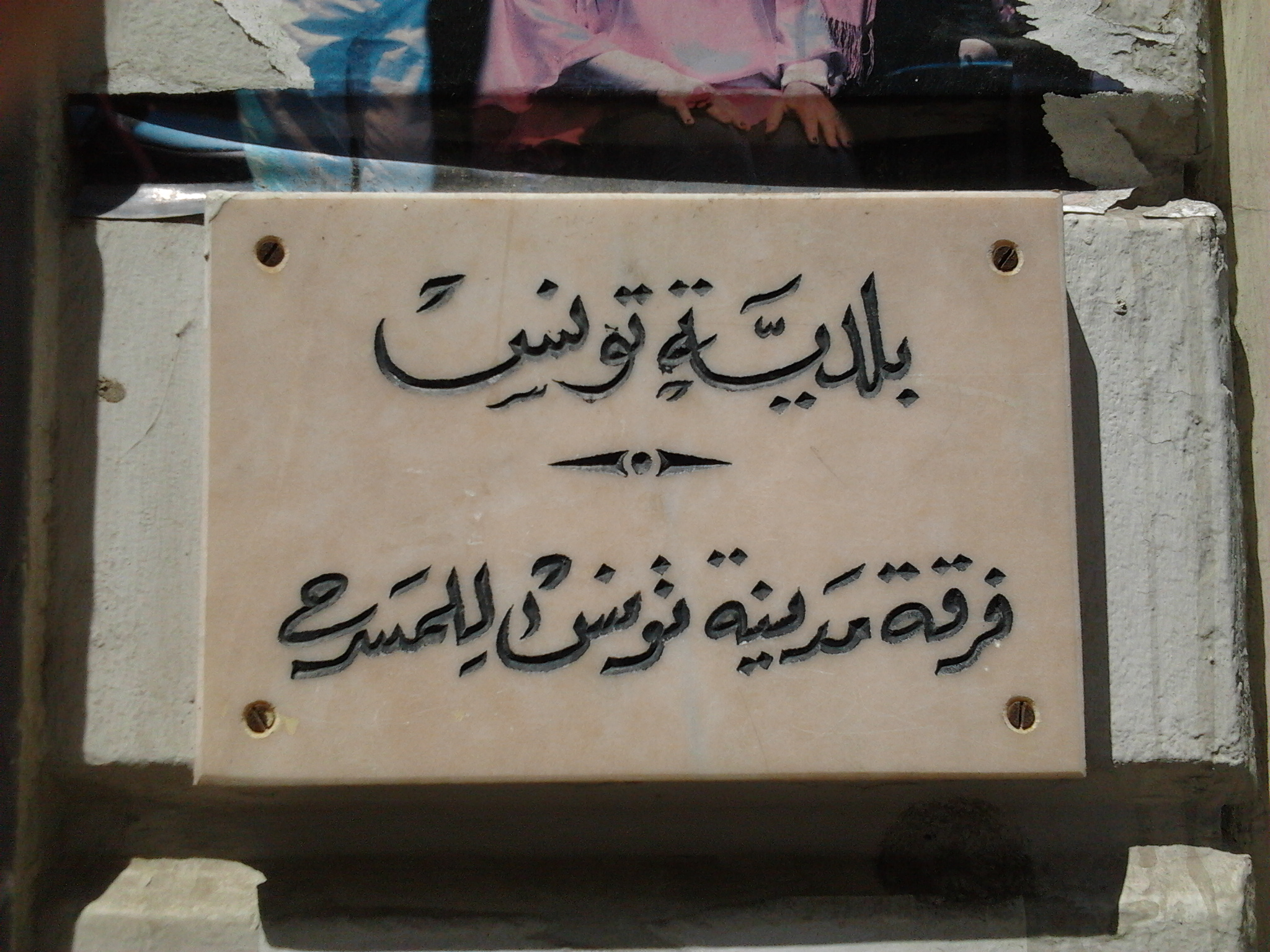
The municipality of Tunis theatre troupe sign

The year after, Mohamed Agrebi, the director of the Tunis Municipality troupe, selects her to join his team, and by the time she became the one to choose for the leading roles in most of the plays.

== Career: theater, cinema and television ==
Noureddine has played in around 150 plays, part of which was directed by Aly Ben Ayed :

- Abd al-Rahman III
- Ahl el berak
- Seven Sleepers
- al-Hallaj
- Antigone
- Atchane ya sabaya
- Beït Bernard alba
- Caligula
- Elloghz
- Ghira Tedhraf échira
- Hamlet
- The Marshall
- The Trojan Women
- Leila men elf lila
- Layla and Majnun
- Mourad III
- Ors eddam
- Sakr Quraysh
- Yerma

In the cinema, she plays in a large number of Tunisian films including Khlifa the Tigneux, Sejnane, Fatma 75, Aziza, And tomorrow...?, The Man of Ashes or The Season of Men. Each of his interpretations, as well in Tunisia as in Maghreb and in Europe, made her earn recognition, critical praise and public appreciation. She plays in the troup of Tunis city at the Théâtre de la Ville, at the Théâtre Récamier, at the Théâtre de l'Odéon, at the Beethoven Festival, in Iran and even in Egypt. In television, she participated in several TV serials including El Khottab Al Bab (Suitors at the door), Mnamet Aroussia (The Dream of Aroussia), Choufli Hal (find Me a Solution) and Nsibti Laaziza (My Dear Beloved Mother-in-Law), all of it directed by Slaheddine Essid. After half a century of activities, in parallel with her status as director of the troup of Tunis City since 2002 – For the first time, since the creation of this company -, she continues to participate in Tunisian and international productions.

== Rewards ==
For her entire career, in 1985 she received the Honorary Prize from the Ministry of Culture. She has also been honored several times in numerous theater festivals in Tunisia and abroad.

== Decorations ==
- Commander of the Order of the Tunisian Republic (2006);
- Grand officer of the Tunisian Order of Merit (2001).

== Filmography ==
=== Cinema ===
==== Feature films ====
- 1958 : Goha by Jacques Baratier
- 1969 : Khlifa the stingy by Hamouda Ben Halima
- 1971 : And tomorrow...? by Brahim Babaï
- 1972 : In the land of Tararanni by Hamouda Ben Halima, Hedi Ben Khalifa and Férid Boughedir
- 1974 : Sejnane by Abdellatif Ben Ammar
- 1975 :
  - Fatma 75 by Salma Baccar
  - Ragol Bima'n Al-Kalima by Nader Galal (en)
- 1976 : Echebka, Rayha Wayn by Ghouti Bendeddouche
- 1980 : Aziza by Abdellatif Ben Ammar
- 1982 :
  - Shadow of the Earth by Taïeb Louhichi
  - The Ballad of Mamelouk by Abdulhafidh Bouassida : Fatma
  - Maazoufet El Matar by Abdellah Rezzoug (en)
- 1986 :
  - Man of Ashes by Nouri Bouzid : Nefissa
  - Sabra Walwuhush by Habib Mselmani
- 1988 : Sama (ar) by Néjia Ben Mabrouk
- 1989 :
  - The Barbarian by Mireille Darc
  - Layla, My Reason (ar) by Taïeb Louhichi
- 1990 : Nomad heart by Fitouri Belhiba
- 1992 :
  - The Sultan of the Medina by Moncef Dhouib
  - Les Zazous de la vague by Mohamed Ali Okbi
- 1994 : The wind of fates by Ahmed Djemai
- 1996 :
  - A Summer in La Goulette by Férid Boughdir
  - Honey and Ashes by Nadia Fares Anliker
- 1997 : Keswa (the lost thread) (ht) by Kelthoum Bornaz : the mother
- 2000 : The Season of Men by Moufida Tlatli : the matriarch
- 2015 : The sky's limits (ar) by Fares Naanaa
- 2018 : Look at me by Nejib Belkadhi

==== Short films ====
- 1973 : Azziara (The Visit) by Hédi Ben Khalifa
- 2010 : The Wave by Mohamed Ben Attia

=== Television ===
==== Tunisian TV serials ====
- 1988 : Inspect with us by Abderrazak Hammami (episode of The Eclipse of the Earth) : Aziza
- 1992 : Liyam Kif Errih by Slaheddine Essid : Jalila
- 1994 :
- Ghada by Khaled Mansour, Habib Jemni and Nabil Bessaida (guest of honor)
- Amwej by Slaheddine Essid : Fatma
- 1995 :
- Habbouni wedalalt by Slaheddine Essid : Habiba
- Normal days by Habib Mselmani : Wahida
- 1995 and 2000 : Edhak Ledonia by Abderrazak Hammami : Hayet
- 1996–1997 : El Khottab Al Bab by Slaheddine Essid, Ali Louati and Moncef Baldi : Mannana
- 1997 :
  - Bab El Khokha by Abdeljabbar Bhouri and Nabil Bessaida : Douja
  - Tej min chouk by Chawki Mejri and Rached Koukech : the queen mother (guest of honor)
- 1999 : Anbar Ellil by Habib Mselmani and Ahmed Rjeb : Mannoubiya
- 2000 :
  - Honey and oleander by Ibrahim Letaief : Aroussia
  - Mnamet Aroussia by Slaheddine Essid : Aroussia Hannafi
- 2002 : Gamret Sidi Mahrous by Slaheddine Essid: Mamiya
- 2003 : Khota Fawka Assahab by Abdellatif Ben Ammar and Mohamed Mongi Ben Tara : Khadija
- 2005 : Chara Al Hobb by Hamadi Arafa : Sallouha
- 2005–2009 : Choufli Hal by Slaheddine Essid and Abdelkader Jerbi : Fadhila
- 2010–2018 : Nsibti Laaziza by Slaheddine Essid and Younes Ferhi : Fatma Gavayess alias Ftaïma
- 2012 : Dar Louzir by Slaheddine Essid : Frida
- 2015 : Lilet Chak by Majdi Smiri and Jamil Najjar : Fatma alias Fattoum
- 2019 : Dar Nana by Mohamed Ali Mihoub, and written by Younes Ferhi : Jawida
- 2022 :
  - Harga (ar) (season 2) by Lassaad Oueslati and Jouda Méjri : Zina
  - Hab Mlouk by Nasreddine Shili : Frida

==== Foreign series ====
- 1981 : Arcole or the Promised Land by Marcel Moussy
- 1999 : Il commissario Montalbano (episode "Il ladro di merendine") by Andrea Camilleri : Aisha

==== TV films ====
- 1987 : Un bambino di nome Gesù (it) by Franco Rossi
- 1990 : The Drop of Gold by Marcel Bluwal
- 1993 : The Eyes of Cécile by Jean-Pierre Denis
- 1994 : Tödliche Dienstreise by Driss Chraïbi and Ray Müller
- 1995 : The Black Sheep (1995) by Francis de Gueltzl, with Hend Sabri
- 2009 : Choufli Hal by Abdelkader Jerbi

==== Videos ====
- 2018 : advertising spot for the Tunisian tomato paste brand Abida

== Theater ==
- 1954 : One Thousand and One Night, directed by Abderrazek Hammami and Abdelmajid Belakhel, written by Mahfoudh Abderrahman and adapted for the theater by Noureddine Kasbaooui
- 1956 : The Merchant of Venice directed by Zaki Toulimat, written by William Shakespeare
- 1956 : Jealousy Makes You Crazy directed by Zaki Toulimat and written by Hedi Abidi
- 1959: Hamlet directed by Aly Ben Ayed and Abdelmajid Belakhal and written by William Shakespeare
- 1960 : Layla and Majnun directed by Hassan Zmerly and produced by Groupe Médina de Tunis
- 1964 : People of the Cave directed by Aly Ben Ayed and written by Tawfiq al-Hakim
- 1966 : Yarma
- 1966 : Mourad III directed by Aly Ben Ayed and written by Tawfiq al-Hakim
- 1967–1986 : "The Marshal" directed by Abderrazek Hammami and Aly Ben Ayed, and written by Noureddine Kasbaoui : La Maréchale Douja
- 1971 : Eight Women
- 1975 : Atshan Ya Sabaya directed by Moncef Souissi, and written by Samir Ayadi, with the participation of Khadija Souissi, Issa Harrath, Slim Mahfoudh, Halima Daoued, Aziza Boulabiar, Ahmed Mouaouia and Hedi Zoghlami
- 1988 : Que Le Bonheur Dure, written and with the direction of Abdelaziz Meherzi and with the participation of Hamadi Arafa
- 2005–2006 : The Marshal (Second version)
- 2015 : I was made a victim, written and with the direction of Abdelaziz Meherzi
- Caligula
- Abd al-Rahman III directed by Abdelaziz Agrebi
- The eagle of Quraysh.
- Bayt Birnard Alba directed by Aly Ben Ayed, and written by Federico García Lorca
- Klaa Maber directed by Abderrazek Hammami with the participation of Monia Ouertani, Rim Zribi, Cherif Abidi, Slim Mahfoudh and Aziza Boulabiar
- Mansur al-Hallaj directed by Moncef Souissi, Saïd Slimane, and written by Ezzedine Madani
- From the Works of Shakespeare
