= Choufli Hal =

- Genre: Sitcom
- Created by: Hatem Bel Hadj
- Directed by: Slaheddine Essid (seasons 1 to 5); Abdelkader Jerbi (season 6)
- Starring: Kamel Touati; Mouna Noureddine; Sofiene Chaari
- Music by: Mouhib Mamar
- Country of origin: Tunisia
- Original language: Tunisian Arabic
- No. of seasons: 6
- No. of episodes: 135

Production
- Executive producer: Rached Younes
- Producers: National Audiovisual Production Agency (seasons 1 to 4); Tunisian Television (seasons 5 and 6)
- Cinematography: Skender Ben Slimane
- Editors: Maher Saidi; Tarek Hmida
- Camera setup: Multi-camera
- Running time: 30–45 minutes

Original release
- Network: YouTube
- Release: October 4, 2005 – September 6, 2009

Choufli Hal (Tunisian Arabic: شوفلي حل ; literally: Find Me a Solution) is a Tunisian television sitcom created by Hatem Bel Hadj and directed by Slaheddine Essid. It aired for six seasons from 4 October 2005, to 6 September 2009, on Tunisie 7 during the month of Ramadan. The series consists of 135 episodes, each with a running time of approximately 40 minutes, and is performed in Tunisian Arabic.

The series was subsequently rebroadcast on El Watania 1 and, regarding the first season, on Al Janoubiya TV and El Watania 2.

== Synopsis ==
The show is centered on the interactions between a psychotherapist and a fortune teller, providing a comedic lens through which common social issues are explored, including adolescence, unemployment, counterfeit goods, and the housing crisis affecting young Tunisians.

The narrative follows the life of Dr. Slimane, a psychotherapist frequently exasperated by the persistent blunders of his younger brother, Sboui, as well as the daily challenges of living with his wife, two daughters, and mother.

Fadhila, Dr. Slimane's mother, resides with him and frequently intervenes to protect her other son, Sboui, from Dr. Slimane's frustration following Sboui's frequent blunders. Sboui initially works as a secretary and later as a courier in Dr. Slimane's office. Fadhila was married twice: first to Hattab, Dr. Slimane's father, and later to Omrane, Sboui's father. She is characterized by her constant bickering with Dr. Slimane's wife, Zeineb, while maintaining a close, maternal bond with Azza, Sboui's fiancée and eventual wife, in whom she sees a younger version of herself.

Azza is the adopted daughter of Janet, a fortune teller who later becomes a cashier at a beauty center. Janet, portrayed as miserly and protective of her wealth, is the owner of the apartment building where both Dr. Slimane's family live. Sboui and Azza eventually have twins: a son named Omrane and a daughter named Sabra.

Zeineb, Dr. Slimane's wife, is depicted as an aspiring woman who successively manages her own business, a beauty center, and eventually a pastry shop. A recurring theme in her character arc is her persistent jealousy toward both Azza and Dalenda (commonly known as Daddou), who serves as Dr. Slimane's secretary beginning in the third episode of the second season. Throughout the series, Dalenda's personal life is a plot point, specifically her romantic involvements with the characters Chekib and Wassim.

Dr. Slimane and Zeineb have two daughters: Amani, the eldest, who is characterized as mischievous and short-tempered. Her character arc often involves her dating despite her father's conservative restrictions. The younger daughter, Fatma, is similarly depicted as clever and disobedient, frequently mirroring her sister's rebellious behavior.

Later in the series, following Fadhila's decision to enroll in an adult education program, Slimane hires a housekeeper named Kalthoum. Characterized by her intense curiosity, Kalthoum frequently speaks of her husband, Daoued, whom she treats with extreme reverence, addressing him as "Sidi" (Master) Daoued. Despite her devotion, it is revealed that Daoued compels her to work specifically to fund his chkobba (a traditional Tunisian card game) gambling habits.

Douja, Zeineb's mother, is a recurring character who frequently visits her daughter; she is portrayed as a wealthy, modern woman preoccupied with maintaining a youthful appearance. For a period, she is romantically involved with a character named Houssi. Additionally, Zeineb reunites with her childhood friend Feïka (Foufa), who is married to a prosperous businessman, Taïeb.

The primary setting for the series' early seasons is an apartment building inhabited by various eccentric neighbors. Among them is Béji Matrix, an electronics repairman who frequently manipulates Sboui for his own amusement. Highly inquisitive, Béji often pries into the private affairs of Dr. Slimane and Sboui's family; consequently, his neighbors avoid him, believing he brings misfortune. Farid (nicknamed Fouchika), a childhood friend of the brothers, initially serves as Béji's apprentice. Following his dismissal by Béji, the building's owner, Janet, appoints him as the concierge. Despite their frequent friction, Farid is depicted as being as shrewd and cunning as his former employer.

== Cast ==
| Cast | Role | Played by | Saison | |
| Cast | Role | Played by | Regular | recurring |
|---|---|---|---|---|
| Dr. Slimane Labiedh | Psychotherapist and professor who initially resides in the same apartment building as his office. Later in the series, he and his family relocate to a villa in the « Ennasr City » in Tunis. | Kamel Touati | 1 to 6 | |
| Fadhila Labiedh | Dr. Slimane's mother, who is a widow. She was married twice: first to Hattab Labiedh, Dr. Slimane's father, and later to Omrane, Sboui's father. | Mouna Noureddine | 1 to 6 | |
| Sboui | Dr. Slimane's half-brother and Fadhila's younger son. Within the series' professional setting, he initially serves as a secretary in Slimane's office before transitioning to the role of a courier. | Sofiène Chaâri | 1 to 6 | |
| Zeineb Labiedh | Dr. Slimane's wife. Throughout the series, successively owns and operates a beauty center, and eventually a pastry shop. | Jamila Chihi | 1 to 6 | |
| Janet | Fortune teller and the owner of the building where Dr. Slimane and his family reside. She has never been married but Azza is her adopted daughter. | Amel Baccouche | 1 to 6 | |
| Azza | Sboui's wife and the adopted daughter of Janet, whom she also serves as an assistant. | Kaouther Belhaj | 1 to 6 | |
| Amani Labiedh | The eldest daughter of Dr. Slimane and Zeineb. | Yosra Manaï | 1 to 6 | |
| Fatma Labiedh | The younger daughter of Dr. Slimane and Zeineb. | Oumayma Ben Hafsia | 1 to 6 | |
| Douja | Zeineb's mother, a widow who married three times, notably to Mondher, Zeineb's father. | Khadija Souissi | 1 to 6 | |
| Béji Matrix | Electronic device repairer in the building, friend of Sboui and Slimane. | Tawfik Bahri | 1 to 6 | |
| Dalenda (known as Daddou) | Secretary of Slimane, colleague and friend of Sboui, she is engaged. | Asma Ben Othman | 2 to 6 | |
| Farid (known as Fouchika) | Employee at Béji's electronics workshop, then Janet's building concierge, childhood friend of Sboui. | Fayçal Bezzine | 3 to 6 | |
| Kalthoum | Labiedh family's housekeeper. | Naïma El Jeni | 4 to 6 | |
| Feïka (known as Foufa) | Zeineb's best friend. | Rim Zribi | 3 to 5 | |
| Taïeb | Husband of Foufa and friend of Slimane, he is a businessman. | Ali Bennour | | 4 to 6 |
| Houssine (known as Houssi) | Boyfriend of Douja. | Slim Mahfoudh | | 1 to 6 |
| Dr. Ben Amor | A former professor and friend of Slimane, a psychotherapist, and president of the « Freud Fans Club ». | Lotfi Dziri | | 2 to 3 |
| Chekib | First fiancé of Dalenda. | Mohamed Hached | | 2 to 6 |
| Wassim | Veterinarian in the Gulf region, Dalenda's second fiancé, and Béji's nephew. | Mohamed Ali Ben Jemaa | | 1 to 6 |
| Mohamed Ali (known as Midou) | A patient of Dr. Slimane, then an employee at Zeineb's beauty center. | Lotfi Abdelli | 5 | 4 |
| Mariem (known as Mimi) | Esthetician at Zeineb's beauty center. | Saoussen Maalej | | 5 |
| Sadek | Dr. Slimane's retired neighbor in the same building. | Belhassen Khedher | | 1 to 6 |
| Daoued | Kalthoum's husband and unemployed. | Mongi Ben Hafsia | | 4 and 6 |
| Omrane | Janet's former fiancé, residing in France. | Ali Khemiri | | 5 |
| Hamza | Amani's classmate and friend during their baccalaureate studies. | Mohamed Kamoun | | 4 to 5 |
| Hanen | Dr. Slimane's patient, suffering from problems following her divorce, then married to an Italian businessman. | Sonia Ben Belgacem | | 1 to 5 |
| Khaoula | New neighbor of the Labiedh family in the Ennasr City, a housewife and wife of a notary. | Leila Chebbi | | 5 to 6 |
| Sonia | University student and new resident of the building. | Rabeb Mejri | | 5 to 6 |
| Sofia | University student and new resident of the building. | Bochra Soltani | | 5 to 6 |
| Chabrouch | Gangster in the neighborhood where the building is located. | Fathi Miled | | 3 to 6 |
| Feker | Zeineb's cousin and former fiancé, a CEO in Canada, is engaged to a Guatemalan woman named Monica. | Zouhair Erraies | | 4 to 5 |
| Jaghali | Burglar and childhood friend of Béji. | Chedly Arfaoui | | 4 to 5 |
| Si Zahi | Dr. Slimane's recurring patient suffers from several problems. | Farhat Hnana | | 1 to 5 |
| Fadhel | Fadhila's teacher at the adult education school. | Moncef Loukil | | 4 and 6 |

== TV Broadcast ==
| Season | Broadcast of the first episode | Broadcast of the last episode | Number of episodes |
|---|---|---|---|
| 1 | 4 October 2005 | 18 October 2005 | 15 |
| 2 | 1 March 2006 | 19 April 2006 | 15 |
| 3 | 24 September 2006 | 24 October 2006 | 30 |
| 4 | 13 September 2007 | 13 October 2007 | 30 |
| 5 | 1 September 2008 | 1 October 2008 | 30 |
| 6 | 22 August 2009 | 6 September 2009 | 15 |

=== Series overview ===
==== Season 1 (2005) ====
The first season follows Dr. Slimane, a middle-class psychotherapist who is forced to share his waiting room with a fortune teller. This neighbor is none other than Janet, the owner of the apartment building where he both lives and works. Even within his own home, Dr. Slimane must navigate constant family squabbles. The household is defined by the ongoing friction between his traditional mother, Fadhila, and his modern wife, Zeineb, alongside the typical sibling rivalry between his eldest daughter, Amani, and his youngest, Fatma.

Fadhila is a loving mother who shows a clear preference for her younger son, Sboui, Dr. Slimane's half-brother. She pressures Dr. Slimane into hiring his younger brother as his secretary, though the latter's incompetence leads to constant blunders in the office. Throughout the season, Sboui is enamored with Azza, Janet's adopted daughter; he spends the entire series attempting to confess his feelings, finally succeeding in the season finale.

==== Season 2 (Spring 2006) ====
Following persistent conflicts with his brother, Sboui resigns from his job at his brother's office and finds himself unemployed. He is replaced by a professional secretary, Dalenda, though Slimane eventually agrees to re-hire him in the lower-ranking role of a courier. On the professional front, Slimane reconnects with his former mentor, Professor Ben Amor, and joins a psychotherapy association. The season concludes with the major revelation that Sboui has officially proposed to Azza.

==== Season 3 (Autumn 2006) ====
In this season, Azza and Sboui repeatedly postpone their engagement due to Sboui's continuous blunders, which strain their relationship. The cast expands with the arrival of Fouchika (Farid), a childhood friend of the brothers, who moves to Tunis. Fouchika begins cohabiting with Sboui while working as an assistant to Béji Matrix.

Meanwhile, Zeineb enthusiastically reconnects with her childhood friend, Foufa, a relationship that causes significant friction and anger for Dr. Slimane. The season's narrative arc culminates during the month of Ramadan, specifically highlighting the long-awaited official engagement of Sboui and Azza.

==== Season 4 (2007) ====
The season begins with Sboui returning from his honeymoon in Tabarka, shortly before discovering that his wife, Azza, is pregnant. Meanwhile, Dr. Slimane decides to build a new house in the Ennasr neighborhood. To finance the construction, he convinces Sboui to sell a plot of land inherited from his father. Sboui agrees to provide the necessary funds on the condition that he and his growing family move into the new villa with Slimane. On the domestic front, Amani prepares for her Baccalaureate (high school graduation) exams while attempting to win the affection of the top student in her class, Hamza. Simultaneously, Dalenda faces romantic turmoil when she discovers that Chekib is seeing another woman. In a sub-plot highlighting social development, Fadhila decides to empower herself by enrolling in an adult literacy program.

==== Season 5 (2008) ====
The season opens with the long-awaited relocation of Slimane, his wife Zeineb, and their daughters to the upscale Ennasr district. This move creates a physical and social divide within the family; while Slimane moves to the suburbs, Sboui and his wife Azza remain in the original apartment, continuing to share the space with Janet and Fadhila.

A central milestone of the season is the birth of Sboui and Azza's twins, a boy and a girl named Omrane and Sabra. Meanwhile, the household faces a transition in the younger generation as the eldest daughter, Amani, leaves the family home to pursue her university studies in Sfax, introducing themes of independence and long-distance family dynamics.

Zeineb decides to open her own spa in collaboration with Foufa and Janet. Following this venture, Janet abandons her career as a fortune teller to become the cashier of the new fitness and wellness center. They are joined by Midou, a former patient of Slimane's, who begins working alongside them at the spa.

Wassim returns from the Middle East having adopted Islamist convictions, a shift that leads Dalenda to end their relationship. Finding herself at a crossroads, she briefly rekindles her romance with her first love, Chekib. However, the relationship ultimately fails due to his repeated infidelity.

==== Television film (Spring 2009) ====
A special television film, with a runtime of 110 minutes, was originally scheduled to air on New Year's Eve, 31 December 2008. However, the broadcast was postponed due to the outbreak of the Gaza War. The film eventually premiered on the evening of 4 April 2009.

Filming took place on location in Tunis and the Zaghouan Governorate, in addition to scenes filmed at the series' original studio in La Charguia.

==== Season 6 (Autumn 2009) ====
In this season, Sboui is discovered by a director and takes part in a commercial where he plays the role of a bird, which makes him famous and leaves Dr. Slimane jealous of his brother. Amani finds a fiancé, a colleague from work, but Slimane does not want her to get married. Zeineb and Fadhila start a new pastry project together.

As for Dalenda, she resumes her relationship with Wassim; they decide to get married and move to the Middle East. At the end of the season, Sboui and his brother Dr. Slimane, now aged, are still bickering with one another.

== Behind the scenes ==
- Reunion of Lead Cast: Sofiène Chaâri stars alongside Kamel Touati and Mouna Noureddine, both of whom have frequently collaborated with him on other television projects.
- Mother-Daughter Collaboration: Naïma El Jeni joined the cast in Season 4, performing alongside her real-life daughter, Oumayma Ben Hafsia.
- Prior Collaborations: Oumayma Ben Hafsia also appears with Jamila Chihi, with whom she previously shared the screen in an episode of the French television series L'Instit.
- Broadcast Schedule: The series was traditionally broadcast during the month of Ramadan between 2005 and 2009, with the exception of Season 2, which premiered in February 2006.
- Cast Changes: Rim Zribi (Foufa) resigned from the series and did not appear in the sixth and final season; her character's absence was explained narratively as an extended trip abroad.
- Filming Location: The series was filmed in a warehouse located in La Charguia, which was specially converted into a television studio for the production.
