= Kamel Touati =

Tunisian actor

- كمال التواتي
- Born: 22 February 1952 (age 74); Tunis, Tunisia
- Occupation: Actor
- Known for: Playing Slimen Labyedh on the Tunisian Television Sitcom Choufli Hal
- Notable work: Halfaouine: Boy of The Terraces
- Television: Un inviato molto speciale

Kamel Touati (Arabic: كمال التواتي; born 22 February 1952) is a Tunisian actor. He is best known for playing Slimen Labyedh on the Tunisian Television sitcom Choufli Hal (Arabic: شوفلي حل), a role he played for the entirety of the show's four-year run.

== Filmography ==
=== Cinema ===
- 1974: Sejnane by Abdellatif Ben Ammar
- 1986: La Coupe by Mohamed Damak: Rached
- 1990: Halfaouine Child of the Terraces by Férid Boughedir
- 1992:
  - Poussière de diamant by Mahmoud Ben Mahmoud and Fadhel Jaïbi
  - Le Sultan de la médina by Moncef Dhouib: Sargene
- 1994: The Silences of the Palace by Moufida Tlatli: Hussein
- 1995:
  - Madame Butterfly by Frédéric Mitterrand: oncle Yakusidé
  - Le Magique by Azedine Melliti: Deanie's father
- 1997: Bent Familia by Nouri Bouzid: Slah
- 1998:
  - Ou noir ou blanc by Anouar Ben Aïssa
  - Festin by Mohamed Damak (short film): Kamel Touati
- 2014: Une Journée sans femme, short film by Najwa Slama Limam
- 2019: Avant qu'il ne soit tard by Majdi Lakhdhar: Hassen

=== Television ===
- 1992: Un inviato molto speciale by Vittorio De Sisti: the perfumer
- 1995:
  - Bab El Khoukha d'Abdeljabbar Bhouri: Mohsen
  - Edhak Ledonia by Tahar Fazaa: Rzouga
- 2001: Hercule Poirot by Brian Eastman: Squat Man
- 2003: Chez Azaïez by Hatem Bel Hadj: Azaïez
- 2004: Loutil (L'Hôtel) by Slaheddine Essid: Cherif Tounsi
- 2005–2009: Choufli Hal by Hatem Bel Hadj: Dr. Slimane Labiedh
- 2010: Dar Lekhlaa by Ahmed Rajab: Kraiem
- 2012: Dar Louzir by Slaheddine Essid: Ismaïl Bourigua
- 2014: Talaa Wala Habet by Majdi Smiri: Ammar
- 2015: Ambulance by Lassaad Oueslati: Majid
- 2015–2017: Bolice by Majdi Smiri: Rchid
- 2015–2018: Nsibti Laaziza by Slaheddine Essid and Younes Ferhi: Abdelaziz alias Azzouz
- 2016: Embouteillage by Walid Tayaa: Morched
- 2018: Elli Lik Lik by Kaïs Chekir: Farhat Gharbi
- 2019: Zanket El Bacha by Nejib Mnasria: Mahmoud Bacha
- 2020: Nouba (season 2) by Abdelhamid Bouchnak: Omrane Bradaris
- 2021: El Foundou by Saoussen Jemni: Abbas alias Marouki
- 2023:
- Captain Tsubasa by Mohamed Ali Mihoub: Abdelmajed
- Sabak El Khir of Kaïs Chekir: Prime Minister
- 2024:
  - Beb Rezk from Heifel Ben Youssef: Hadj Taher
  - Super Tounsi by Kaïs Chekir: Prime Minister
- 2026: El Khottifa (The Swallow Bird, Arabic: الخطّيفة), by Saoussen Jemni: Dr. Lazher Belkhir

=== Videos ===
- 2009: advertising spot for GlobalNet
- 2011: advertising spot for the Tunisian margarine brand Régina

=== Theater ===
- 1974: Le Chariot by Lamine Nahdi and Jamel Eddine Ben Rahal
- 1975: Meriah
- 1989:
  - El Aweda, text and direction by Fadhel Jaïbi and Fadhel Jaziri
  - Klem Ellil by Taoufik Jebali
- 1992: Comedia, text and direction by Fadhel Jaïbi
- 1993: Familia, text and direction by Fadhel Jaïbi
- 1999: Contre X by Taoufik Jebali
- 2004: Ahna hakka
- 2015: Ré... animation
- 2020: Mammou W Chhima by Lassaâd Ben Abdallah

=== TV Shows ===
- 2013:
  - 5outh Bayek on Radio IFM: guest
  - Labès with Naoufel Ouertani on El Hiwar El Tounsi: season 3 episode 2 guest
- 2014: Braquage on Jawhara FM: guest
- 2016:
  - Romdhane Show with Hedi Zaiem on Mosaïque FM: guest
- 2018: Le Programme with Amine Gara on Attessia TV: guest
- 2020:
  - Noujoum with Naoufel Ouertani: guest
  - Tak Ö Tak on Mosaïque FM: guest
  - Tounes El Yaoum with Mariem Belkadhi: season 2 episode 100 guest
- 2021:
  - Fekret Sami Fehri with Hedi Zaiem on El Hiwar El Tounsi: season 3 episode 26 guest

== Distinctions ==
- 2006: Commander of the Tunisian Order of Merit
- 2018: Voted Best Tunisian Actor by L'Émission on El Hiwar El Tounsi
