= Naima El Jeni =

Tunisian actress

- نعيمة الجاني
- Born: 18 December 1958 (age 67)
- Occupation: Actress
- Years active: 1990–present
- Notable work: Halfaouine: Boy of The Terraces (1990)
- Spouse: Mongi Ben Hafsia (divorced)
- Children: Oumayma Ben Hafsia

Naima El Jeni (Arabic: نعيمة الجاني) is a Tunisian actress. She was a stage actress before she began filming in 1990. Her daughter Oumayma Ben Hafsia is also an actress.

== Filmography ==
=== Cinema ===
- 1990 : Halfaouine Child of the Terraces by Férid Boughedir
- 1996 : Miel et Cendres by Nadia Fares Anliker : Nabila
- 2002 : Poupées d'argile by Nouri Bouzid
- 2004 : Parole d'hommes by Moez Kamoun
- 2005 : Khochkhach by Selma Baccar
- 2008 : Le Projet (Short films) by Mohamed Ali Nahdi
- 2016 : Woh ! by Ismahane Lahmar : Dalenda

=== Television ===
==== Series ====
- 1992 :
  - El Douar by Abdelkader Jerbi : Selma
  - Ouled Ennas by Moncef Dhouib : Saoussen
- 1993 :
  - Warda by Hamadi Arafa
  - El Assifa by Abdelkader Jerbi : Radhia
- 1995 :
  - Edhak Ledonia by Tahar Fazaa : Fatma
  - La Chute du sable by Mohamed Ghodbane : Zina
- 1996 : Le Drapeau et la pluie by Fawaz Abdelki
- 1996 - 1997 : El Khottab Al Bab (Suitors are on the door) by Slaheddine Essid, Ali Louati and Moncef Baldi : Hadda
- 1997 : Bab El Khoukha by Abdeljabbar Lebhouri : Nadhira
- 2000 : Mnamet Aroussia by Slaheddine Essid : Sassia
- 2000 - 2001 : Idhhak Li Doniya by Abderrazak Hammami : Fatma
- 2001 : Dhafayer by Habib Mselmani : Louiza
- 2003 : Ikhwa wa Zaman by Hamadi Arafa : Mongia
- 2004 : Hissabat w Aqabat by Habib Mselmani : Meriem Bent Saouef
- 2005 : Aoudat Al Minyar by Habib Mselmani : Chahla
- 2006 : Hayet Wa Amani by Mohamed Ghodhbane : Hayet
- 2007 : Kamanjet Sallema by Hamadi Arafa : Neïla
- 2007 - 2009 : Choufli Hal (seasons 4–6) by Slaheddine Essid and Abdelkader Jerbi : Kalthoum
- 2008 : Sayd Errim by Ali Mansour : Nejma
- 2010 :
  - Casting by Sami Fehri (guest of honor)
  - Garage Lekrik by Ridha Béhi
- 2012 : Dar Louzir by Slaheddine Essid : Janet
- 2013 : Yawmiyat Imraa by Khalida Chibeni : Habiba
- 2013 - 2014 : Caméra Café by Ibrahim Letaïef : Bahija
- 2014 : Naouret El Hawa (season 1) by Madih Belaïd : Khadija
- 2014 - 2015 : Bent Omha by Youssef Milad and Mokhless Moalla : Douja
- 2015 : Le Risque by Nasreddine Shili
- 2016 - 2018 : Denya Okhra by Sami Fehri : Mongia
- 2016 :
  - Sohba ghir darjine by Hamza Messaoudi : Habiba
  - Bolice 2.0 by Majdi Smiri (guest of honor)
- 2019 :
  - Sohba ghir darjine 2.0 by Hamza Messaoudi : Habiba
  - El Harba by Kaïs Chkir : the mother of Chakib
- 2020 : Denya Okhra by Kaïs Chkir : the mother of Sabri
- 2021 :
  - Millionnaire by Muhammet Gök
- 2021 + 2022 : El Foundou de Saoussen Jemni : the mother of Yahia
- 2022 : Ken Ya Makenech (season 2) by Abdelhamid Bouchnak

==== TV movies ====
- 2007 : Puissant by Habib Mselmani
- 2009 : Choufli Hal by Abdelkader Jerbi : Kalthoum

==== Emissions ====
- 2012 : Le Crocodile (episode 9) on Ettounsiya TV
- 2014 : L'anglizi (episode 2) on Tunisna TV

== Theater ==
- 2012 : Daddou candidate aux élections présidentielles by Moncef Dhouib
- 2016 : Malla Aïla by Sadok Halwes
- Woufa Al Maktoub, text by Tahar Radhouani and directed by Sadok Halwes, with Dorsaf Mamlouk : the lawyer
- Aâtini Forssa, directed by Sadok Halwes, with Dorsaf Mamlouk
- Ayla (Family), director by Sadok Halwes, with Dorsaf Mamlouk
- Fezzani Mertah, text by Salah Jday and Mohamed Ghodbane, with Mongi Ben Hafsia
- Etalibet (The students), text by Azzouz Chennaoui and directed by Mongi Ben Hafsia
