= Tawfik Bahri =

Tunisian actor (died 2021)

- Born: 28 July 1952; Tunisia
- Died: 18 December 2021 (aged 69)
- Other name: Beji matrix
- Occupation: Actor
- Known for: playing the role of Béji Matrix in the series Choufli Hal
- Notable work: Making Of

Tawfik Bahri (Arabic: توفيق البحري; 28 July 1952 – 18 December 2021) was a Tunisian actor. He was best known for playing the role of Béji Matrix in the series Choufli Hal. Born on 28 July 1952

== Filmography ==
=== Cinema ===
==== Feature films ====
- 1992: Les Zazous de la vague by Mohamed Ali Okbi
- 2006:
  - The TV is coming by Moncef Dhouib
  - Making of by Nouri Bouzid
- 2010:
  - The Wounded Palm Trees by Abdellatif Ben Ammar
  - End of December (ar) by Moez Kamoun (ar)
- 2012: Bitter Patience (Hickey) by Nasreddine Shili
- 2013: Bastardo by Nejib Belkadhi: Khalifa
- 2016: Perfume of Spring by Férid Boughedir: Zizou
- 2019: Porto Farina of Ibrahim Letaief: Brigadier
- 2021: The Albatross by Fredj Trabelsi

==== Shorts ====
- 2010: In the meantime of Atef El Atifi
- 2015: The Purple House by Selim Gribâa: Hsan

=== Television ===
==== Series ====
- 1996: El Khottab Al Bab by Slaheddine Essid, Ali Louati and Moncef Baldi (Guest of Honor of episode 3 of season 1): Lotfi
- 1999: Anbar Ellil by Habib Mselmani
- 2001:
  - Ryhana by Hamadi Arafa and Ahmed Rajab
  - Dhafayer by Habib Mselmani and Madih Belaid
- 2002: Gamret Sidi Mahrous by Slaheddine Essid: Jalloul
- 2004: Ejbekchi by Ali Mansour
- 2005: Halloula w Sallouma by Ibrahim Letaief and Fares Naânaâ: Slim's father alias Sallouma
- 2005–2009: Choufli Hal by Slaheddine Essid and Abdelkader Jerbi: Béji Matrix
- 2007: Arboun by Abdelhakim Alimi
- 2010: Malla Zhar by Sami Bel Arbi: Ibrahim
- 2011: Tawla w Kressi by Ridha Behi, Abdelmajid Jallouli and Imed Ben Hmida
- 2012:
  - Dar Louzir by Slaheddine Essid: Si Allala
  - Dipanini by Hatem Bel Hadj (guest of honor)
- 2013:
  - Yawmiyat Aloulou by Kamel Youssef, Tarek Ben Hjal and Bechir Mannai: Behi
  - Camera Café by Ibrahim Letaief (Guest of honor)
  - Awled Lebled (pilot) of Selim Benhafsa and Yassine Sherif
- 2014: Ikawi Saadek by Émir Majouli et Oussama Abdelkader
- 2014–2015: Naouret El Hawa by Madih Belaid: Mongi
- 2015:
  - Risk by Nasreddine Shili: guest of honor
  - Ambulance of Lassaad Oueslati: guest of honor
- 2016: Warda w Kteb by Ahmed Rjeb: Hamma
- 2018:
  - Elli Lik Lik of Kais Shekyr and Kais Neji
  - 7 sbaya of Khalfallah Kholsi: Tawfik
- 2019:
  - Ali Chouerreb (season 2) by Madih Belaid and Rabii Tekali: Salah alias Saliha
  - Zanket El Bacha by Nejib Mnasria: Abdelmajid

=== TV Movies ===
- 2002: Divorce caprice (Talak Incha) by Moncef Dhouib: the driver of Faïza's car
- 2006: The Gospel of Judas by James Barrat: the Egyptian dealer
- 2007: Powerful by Habib Mselmani
- 2009: Choufli Hal from Abdelkader Jerbi: Béji Matrix

=== Videos ===
- 2012: advertising spot for the ice cream brand Selja
- 2013: Matadhrabnich (Don't hit me), campaign for the reform of the police system
- 2018: advertising spot for the brand Danette

=== Theatre ===
- 2003:
  - Rebelote (Machki or Aoued) by Abdelaziz Meherzi
  - Put yourself in my shoes, text by Nasr Gharbi and direction by Tawfik Bahri
- 2007: Eddounia Fourja, text by Mohamed Jeriji and direction by Ikram Azzouz
- 2012: Carthage in madness (Al Jamâa) by Hédi Oueld Baballah, text by Beshyr Chaâbuni and Hedy Ben Amor
- 2014:
  - Al Makam Al Sihri by Tawfik Bahri
  - Dar Ethakafa by Moncef Dhouib
  - El Hala Adia, adaptation of the play Al-Najet by the Egyptian writer Naguib Mahfouz, directed by Hassen Mouadhen
