= Ahmed Landolsi =

Tunisian actor

- أحمد الأندلسي
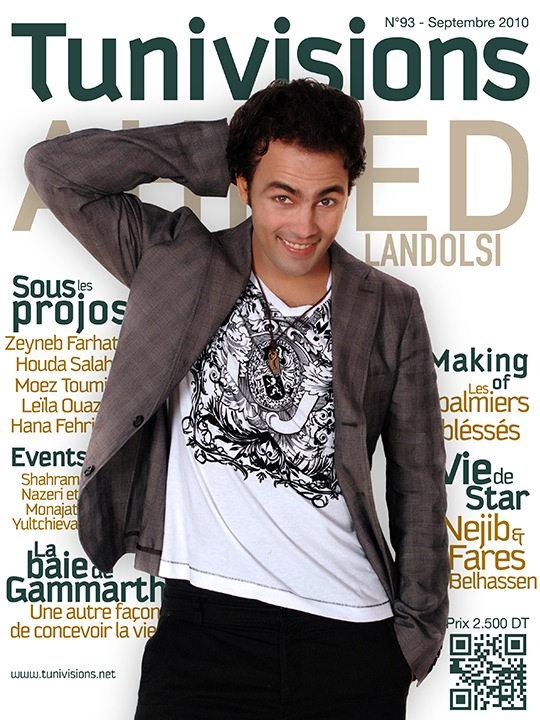
- Landolsi on the cover of Tunivisions, in 2010.
- Born: 16 November 1983 (age 43); Tunisia
- Occupation: Actor

Ahmed Landolsi (Arabic: أحمد الأندلسي) is a Tunisian actor.

== Biography ==
He owns a casting agency for commercials, clips and appearances for variety shows.

== Career ==
He begins to make some appearances in some local television productions. Then, in 2005, he became a host and columnist on the program Ahla Jaw hosted by Hela Rokbi. He turns in a few commercials before landing his first role in a television series. In 2007, he landed a main role in the Layali el bidh TV serial (White Nights).

In 2008 he obtained the role of Mehdi in the TV serial Maktoub (Destiny), which made him known to the audience. In 2010, he played the role of Ahmed in the TV serial "Casting".

On 13 April 2016 he made homophobic remarks on the Klem Ennes (People's Talk) program on El Hiwar El Tounsi, leading the Shams association, which defends the LGBT community in Tunisia, to demand that he apologize and to threaten to make his outing.

In July of the same year, Ahmed Landolsi received the best actor Award for his role as Zied in the TV serial Awled Moufida (Sons of Moufida) at the Romdhane Awards, awarded by Mosaique FM.

In 2016 he was arrested for a family abandonment case and issuing bad checks, before being released a few days later. On the evening of 18 August 2018, he was arrested again for a procedure of issuance of checks without funds.

On 20 May 2019 he announced the imminent end of his career.

== Filmography ==
=== Cinema ===
- 2004 : Noce d'été by Mokhtar Ladjimi (guest of honor)
- 2006 : Making of by Nouri Bouzid (guest of honor)
- 2008 : Le Projet (short film) by Mohamed Ali Nahdi : Sami
- 2018 :
  - Stouche by Karim Berrhouma : the autopsy nurse 1
  - Damergi by Karim Berrhouma : Naceur Damergi
  - Gauche... droite by Moutia Dridi
- 2020 : Dajjal by Karim Berrhouma
- 2021 : Hadés by Mohamed Khalil Bahri

=== Television ===
==== Series ====
- 2004 : Loutil (L'Hôtel) by Slaheddine Essid (guest of honor episode 11) : the hotel visitor
- 2005 : Aoudat Al Minyar by Habib Mselmani and Ali Louati (guest of honor)
- 2006 :
  - Hayet w Amani by Mohamed Ghodbane (guest of honor episode 5) : Hechmi Abdelwerith
  - Hkeyet El Eroui by Habib Jemni (guest of honor) : Hassen
- 2007 :
  - Layali el bidh by Habib Mselmani : Haïthem
  - Choufli Hal by Slaheddine Essid (guest of honor of episodes 3, 4, 9 and 17 of season 1) : Hédi Balha, Amani's boyfriend
- 2008–2014 : Maktoub by Sami Fehri : Mehdi Néji
- 2009 : Who Was Jesus by Alexander Marengo : Jesus
- 2010 : Casting by Sami Fehri : Ahmed Radhouane
- 2013 : Yawmiyat Imraa by Khalida Chibeni : Fehmi
- 2015 :
  - School (season 2) by Rania Gabsi and Sofien Letaiem : Raeef
  - Naouret El Hawa by Madih Belaïd (guest of honor of episode 4 of season 2) : Kamel
- 2015–2017 : Awled Moufida by Sami Fehri : Zied
- 2016 : Bolice 2.0 by Majdi Smiri (episode 3 guest of honor) : Si Ahmed
- 2016–2017 : Flashback by Mourad Ben Cheikh : Faycel
- 2018 :
  - Familia Lol by Nejib Mnasria (episode 3 guest of honor) : the tenant of the house
  - Tej El Hadhra by Sami Fehri : Mustapha Khaznadar
- 2019 : Machair by Muhammet Gök : Kacem
- 2020 : Galb El Dhib by Bassem Hamraoui (guest of honor from episodes 1 to 6) : Si Sadok
- 2021 :
  - 16/16 by Hamdi Jouini : Alexya
  - Machair 2 by Muhammet Gök : Kacem
- 2023: Djebel Lahmar de Rabii Tekali (episodes 15–19 guest of honor): Massinissa, brother of Samra

==== TV movies ====
- 2012 : Le Tireur d'élite by Yosri Bouassida : Adnene Zarrouk

==== TV Programs ====
- 2013 : ITech on Ettounsiya TV : TV Presenter
- 2014 :
  - Taxi 2 (episode 24) on Nessma TV : Guest
  - L'anglizi (The English) (episode 7) on Tunisna TV : Guest
- 2015 : Belmakchouf with Adel Bouhlel on Hannibal TV : Guest
- 2017 : Sadma on MBC 1 : TV Presenter
- 2018 :
  - Abdelli Showtime with Lotfi Abdelli (episode 2 of season 2) on Attessia TV : Guest
  - Labès (season 7) with Naoufel Ouertani (part 3 of episode 7) on Attessia TV : Guest
  - Ramzi hal Tahlom with Ramzi Abdeljaoued on Attessia TV : Guest
- 2019 :
  - Labès (saison 8) with Naoufel Ouertani on Attessia TV : Guest
  - Ethhak Maana (Laugh with us) with Naoufel Ouertani (season 1) on Attessia TV : columnist
- 2020 :
- Abdelli Showtime with Lotfi Abdelli (episode 10 of season 3) on Attessia TV : Guest
- Battle Chef on Attessia TV :TV Presenter
- El Weekend with Afef Gharbi on Attessia TV : Guest
  - Fekret Sami Fehri (Sami Fehri's Idea) with Hedy Zaiem on El Hiwar El Tounsi (episode 2 of season 2) : Guest
  - Familya Time with Jihen Milad on Attessia TV (First Part of episode 12) : Guest
  - Sayef Maana with Naoufel Ouertani on Attessia TV (Second & Third Part of episode 13) : Guest
  - Alech Lé? (Why Not ?) with Khouloud Mabrouk on Carthage+ (Second Episode) : Guest of Episode 2
- 2021 :
  - Labès (season 10) with Naoufel Ouertani on Attessia TV : Guest of episode 14 (part 4)
  - Minute 60 with Naoufel Ouertani on Mosaïque FM : Guest
  - Star Time with Oumaima Ayari on Radio IFM : Guest
  - Romdhane Show sur Mosaïque FM avec Malek El Ouni et Hédi Zaiem : Guest
  - Sahri Bahri on Tunisna TV with Youssef Bahri : Guest
  - Only He whio stays up with Naoufel Ouertani on Attessia TV : Guest of episode 28
  - What Granma Told Us with Wajiha Jendoubi on Radio Med : Guest
  - Be Cool on Radio Med : Guest
- 2022 :
  - Labès (season 11) with Naoufel Ouertani on El Hiwar El Tounsi : Guest of part 1 of episode 16 of season 11
  - Kmiss 3lik with Fayçal Hdhiri on Tunisna TV : Guest
  - Sakarli El Barnamej (End The Show) with Ala Chebbi : Guest of Episode 1 of season 1 on Carthage+
  - Labès with Naoufel of Naoufel Ouertani on Attessia TV : Guest
- 2023 : Fekret Sami Fehri (Guest of honor of episode 9 of season 6) with Hédi Zaiem on El Hiwar Ettounsi : Guest
- 2023 :
- Fekret Sami Fehri (Guest of episode 9 of season 6) with Hedy Zaiem on El Hiwar El Tounsi : Guest
- Jeu Dit Tout (Guest of the second part of episode 11 of season 5) with Amine Gara : Guest
- Difna 3ala Kifna (Guest of honor of episode 11 of season 3) with Mayssa Badis : Guest

== Clips ==
- 2016 : Ikertbet by Imen Cherif
- 2019 : Manich Behi by Klay BBj
- 2020 : Mosrar by Zahra Fares
