= Haute Autorité Indépendante de la Communication Audiovisuelle =

Tunisian public institution

The Haute Autorité indépendante de la communication audiovisuelle (Independent High Authority for Audiovisual Communication, Arabic:الهيئة العليا المستقلة للاتصال السمعي البصري), or HAICA, is a Tunisian public institution with financial and administrative autonomy, created to regulate the establishing and operation of audiovisual media outlets within the rule of law—while guaranteeing the freedom of expression, and protecting human rights. It was founded on 3 May 2013 by the order of decree number 116 of 2021 of the Tunisian Republic.

== Objective ==
The HAICA has regulatory and advisory powers. It is responsible for reforming the media and guaranteeing the freedom, independence and diversity of the rapidly expanding media.

== Composition ==
The HAICA is directed by a committee composed of 9 independent members, named by the President of Tunisia on the proposal of different professional bodies. Each member is named for a single mandate of six years, and there is renewal of 3 members every two years.

In May 2013, Nouri Lajmi was named as the head of the HAICA along with the following members : Raja Chaouachi, Rachida Ennaifer, Mohsen Riahi, Riadh Ferjani, Habib Belaïd, Hichem Snoussi et Radhia Saïdi. On 8 July 2013, Mohsen Riahi resigned, denouncing the lack of transparent procedures in granting visas to audiovisual communication establishments. Raja Chaouachi also quit the HAICA to retake his position as a judge of a Tunisian court in August of the same year. In June 2015, Assia Laabidi, Adel B'sili et Amel Chahed were named as new members.

== Sanctions ==
The HAICA has imposed sanctions on various media outlets:

- 27 February 2014 : suspension of the television show Andi Mankolek for a month and a fine of 200,000 dinars against Ettounsiya TV for violating the privacy and dignancy of a private individual;
- 26 May 2014 : suspension of the television show Kamikaze ellil for a month on Al Janoubiya TV for disrespect of human dignity and privacy following the May 25 episode during which a segment titled "Tunisian students. What are they doing?";
- 6 August 2014 : suspension of the television show Ness Nessma for a month as the result of the invitation of a Libyan guest advocating terrorism and violence;
- 7 August 2014 : suspension of the television show Yahdouthou fi tounes on Hannibal TV for a week following the appearance of the same guest;
- 22 September 2014 : fine of 50,000 dinars on Nessma, Hannibal TV, Al Janoubiya TV, Tunisna TV and Zitouna TV and a fine of 20,000 dinars on MFM, Nour FM, M'saken FM and "Radio du Saint Coran" for non-regularization of their legal status;
- 8 October 2014 : fine of 10,000 dinars on Zitouna TV for an advertisement in favor of Ennahdha in the middle of an election campaign;
- 24 October 2014 : fine of 10,000 dinars on Hannibal TV for an advertisement in favor of Nidaa Tounes during an election campaign;
- 11 November 2014 : fine of 10,000 dinars on Nessma for the broadcast and rebroadcast for reporting in favor of presidential candidate Béji Caïd Essebsi;
- 14 November 2014 : fine of 20,000 dinars on Express FM due to the broadcast of a segment during which presidential candidate Ahmed Néjib Chebbi, evoked a poll which gave him 45% favorable opinions, without the host of the segment interrupting him, in violation of election law;
- 14 November 2014 : fine of 5,000 dinars on RTCI for having called the October 25 elections a "useful vote" during legislative elections;
- 18 November 2014 : fine of 20,000 dinars on the national radiodue to the usage of poll results during the November 11 morning broadcast;
- 5 December 2014 : fine of 20,000 dinars on Mosaïque FM and the chain Al Moutawasset for having mentioned, in their broadcasts and over the course of the election campaign, the results of a poll pertaining to the presidential election and a fine of 3,000 dinars on Shems FM and 5,000 dinars towards Tunisna TV for the broadcast of a propaganda message towards the results of certain candidates during the first round of the presidential election ;
- 20 December 2014 : a second fine of 20,000 dinars towards Nessma for a political advertisement in favor of the same candidate in the presidential election, Béji Caïd Essebsi;
- 30 December 2014 : fine of 20,000 dinars towards Nessma for recidivism and 10,000 dinars towards Télévision tunisienne 1 and Hannibal TV for having the broken the law regarding silence towards elections by broadcasting advertisement in the form of reporting or by holding positions in favor of a presidential candidate, Béji Caïd Essebsi.
- 6 July 2015 : fine of 50,000 dinars towards Ettounsiya TV for broadcasting without authorization.
- 17 June 2016 : fine of 15,000 dinars on Hannibal TV violation of children's rights and fine of 30,000 dinars on Insane TV with suspension of the broadcast Kalimat Al Joumouaa for three months for inciting hate and violence.
- 1 November 2017 : summoning of Myriam Belkadhi, presenter of the broadcast 24/7, after the usage of language deemed inappropriate on the part of one of the columnists

== See also ==
- 2014 Tunisian presidential election
