= Sofiene Chaari =

Tunisian actor (1962–2011)

- Born: 31 July 1962
- Died: 22 August 2011 (aged 49); La Marsa, Tunisia
- Occupations: Actor, television presentator, humorist
- Years active: 2001–2011
- Spouse: Sihem Benzarti (before 2011)
- Children: Mohamed Habib Chaari

Sofiene Chaari (31 July 1962 – 22 August 2011) was a Tunisian actor who is famous for his role of Sbouï in the sitcom Choufli Hal (2005–2009).

== Career ==
He was the son of Habib Chaari, actor and cinema producer who helped him start his career in theater before turning to television. He first played in Mnamet Aaroussia, At Azaïez and The Hotel before becoming well known as Sbouï in Choufli Hal, a Tunisian TV series aired from 2005 to 2009 during Ramadan. He played alongside Mouna Noureddine and Kamel Touati. After that, he remained famous with his role of Hsouna in Nsibti Laaziza aired on Nessma TV. He also presented his own TV-show Sofiene Show which aired from 2009 to 2010. Alongside his TV career, he also played in theater in Saâdoun 28 and The Marechal. He earned a presidential prize in 2005 before he died in La Marsa, Tunisia, from a myocardial infarction at the age of 49.

== Filmography ==
=== Cinema ===
- 1998 : Feast (short film) directed by Mohamed Damak
- 2004 : Deadlines directed by Ludi Boeken and Michael A. Lerner
- 2004 : Words of men directed by Moez Kamoun (ar)
- 2006 : Making of directed by Nouri Bouzid
- 2011 : Always Brando (en) directed by Ridha Béhi

=== Télévision ===
==== Séries ====
- 1997 : El Khottab Al Bab (Grooms on the door) (Guest of honor of episode 15 of season 2) directed by Slaheddine Essid and written by Ali Louati and Moncef Baldi
- 1998 : Îchqa wa Hkayet (Love and stories) directed by Slaheddine Essid , Mohamed Mongi Ben Tara and written by Ali Louati : Essebti
- 2000 : Mnamet Aroussia (The dream of Aroussia) directed by Slaheddine Essid : Abd Razzek (flowers' seller)
- 2001 : Malla Ena (What I am) directed by Abdelkader Jerbi
- 2003 : At Azaïez written by Hatem Bel Haj : Sadok
- 2004 : Loutil (The hotel) directed by Slaheddine Essid : Stoukou
- 2005–2009 : Choufli Hal (Find me a solution) directed by Slaheddine Essid and then Abdelkader Jerbi in the last season : Sboui
- 2010–2011 : Nsibti Laaziza (My dear Mother-in-law) directed by Slaheddine Essid : Hassouna El Behi

==== TV Films ====
- 2009 : Choufli Hal (Find me a solution) directed by Abdelkader Jerbi : Sboui

==== TV Shows ====
- 2009–2010 : Sofiène show : TV presenter

=== Videos ===
- 2009 : advertising spot for GlobalNet
- 2011 : advertising spot for the company El Mazraa

=== Theater ===
- 2005–2006 : The Marchal, text by Noureddine Kasbaoui and direction by Abdelaziz Meherzi
- 2009 : Comidino
- 2009–2010 : Saâdoun 28 directed by Mounir Ergui

== Personal life and death ==
Chaari was married to Sihem Benzarti, the sister of the former Tunisian football player Faouzi Benzarti, together they had one son, Mohamed Habib Chaari.

=== Death ===
On August 22, 2011, shortly before midnight, he died in a clinic in La Marsa following a heart attack. He was buried the next day in a cemetery in La Manouba.
