= Faisal Bezzine =

Tunisian actor

- فيصل بالزين
- Born: 12 January 1964 (age 62); Tunis, Tunisia
- Occupation: Actor

Faisal Bezzine (Arabic: فيصل بالزين) (born in Tunisia on 12 January 1964) is a Tunisian actor.

== Biography ==
Bezzine obtained his first role in the series El Khottab Al Bab where he played Stayech, the adopted child of the Tammars, alongside Mouna Noureddine and Raouf Ben Amor. Then, he finds Noureddine in the TV series Mnamet Aroussia.

In 2003, he starred in the soap opera Chez Azaïez before playing the role of Fouchika in the series Choufli Hal and later his TV movie, which made him known to the general public.

== Television ==
- 1996–1997: El Khottab Al Bab (Suitors are on the door) by Slaheddine Essid, Ali Louati & Moncef Baldi: Stayech (Kmar Zaman Missawi alias Kamayer)
- 2001: Mnamet Aroussia (The Dream of Arussia) by Slaheddine Essid & Ali Louati: Azzaiz Chared
- 2003: 3and Azaïez (In Azaiz Boutique) by Slaheddine Essid & Hatem Belhadj: Moez
- 2004: Loutil (The Hostel) by Slaheddine Essid & Hatem Belhadj: Assil
- 2005: Café Jalloul of Lotfi Ben Sassi, Imed Ben Hamida & Mohamed Damak: Azzedine alias Azza
- 2006–2009: Choufli Hal (Find Me A Solution) (TV serial) by Slaheddine Essid & Abdelkader Jerbi: Fouchika – Fareed
- 2014: Ikawi Saadek (May God Make You Have More Chance) by Emir Majouli & Oussama Abdelkader: Zarbut
- 2017: Bolice 4.0 (Police Normal Status) by Majdi Smiri & Zouhour Ben Hamdi: Abu Yaareb Mutiaa El Arfaui
- 2019: Zanket El Bacha by Nejib Mnasria: Ftila (Wannas)
- 2022: Kan Ya Ma Kanich (season 2) by Abdelhamid Bouchnak: King Fakher Touil

== Telefilm ==
- 2009: Choufli Hal (téléfilm) d'Abdelkader Jerbi: Fouchika

== Theater ==
- 1994: Halwani Bab Souika by Bachir Drissi and Hamadi Arafa
- Carthage and After
- Marichal Ammar
- Le Clown & the Dress of the Princess
- The Trip Of Ghanney
- Continue
- The Revolution of the Nature
