= Amina Ben Doua =

Tunisian radio personality and television presenter

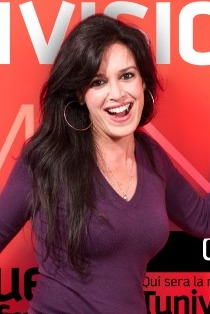
- Photograph of Amina Ben Doua taken in 2010.
- Born: 1 January 1953 (age 73)
- Occupations: Television presenter, Radio personality

Amina Ben Doua is a Tunisian TV presenter and producer and a famous radio host. She presented in Hannibal TV and Attessia TV. She joined Mosaique FM in 2003. Since 2008 she hosts the daily show "Forum Mosaique". She got married on 15 June 2019.

== Work ==
=== Radio ===
2003–2008: Ahla Sbah (Mosaïque FM) 2008: Forum (Mosaïque FM)

=== Television ===
2015: Het Nahkiw (Hannibal TV) 2016: Houna Al An (Attessia TV)
