= Ali Khemiri =

Tunisian actor

- علي الخميري
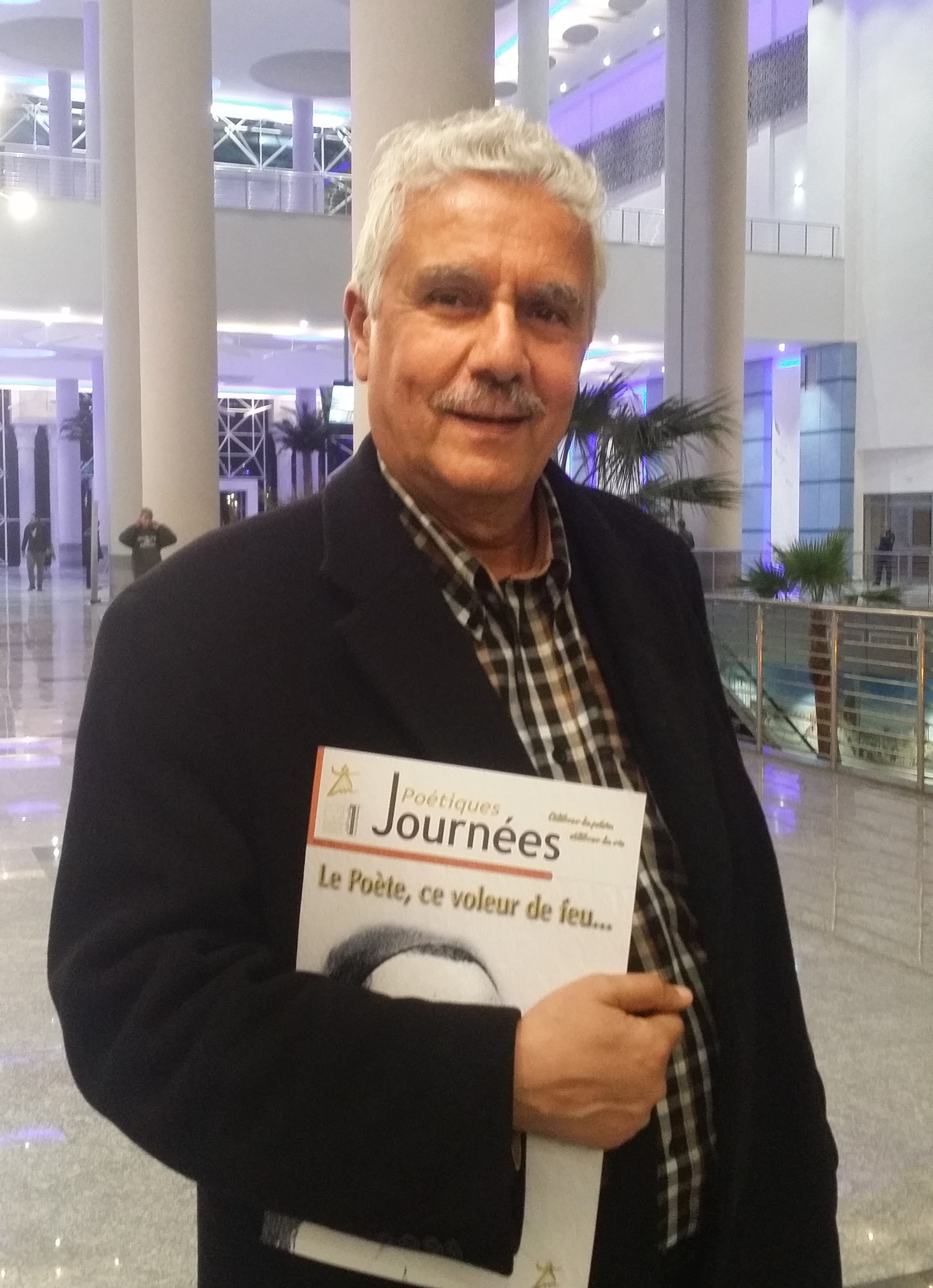
- Khemiri in 2018
- Born: Jendouba, Tunisia
- Occupation: Actor
- Notable work: The Season of Men

Ali Khemiri (Arabic: علي الخميري; born 1950) is a Tunisian actor, stage director and theater teacher.

== Filmography ==
=== Cinema ===
- 2000: The Season of Men by Moufida Tlatli
- 2006 : Bin El Widyene (Between the rivers) by Khaled Barsaoui
- 2008: L'Accident (The accident) by Rachid Ferchiou
- 2010: Fin décembre (End of December) by Moez Kamoun
- 2015: Conflit (Conflict) by Moncef Barbouch

=== Television ===
- 1996: El Khottab Al Bab by Slaheddine Essid, Ali Louati and Moncef Baldi (guest of honor in episode 3 of season 1): the commissioner
- 2001: Dhafayer by Habib Mselmani, Madih Belaid and Abdelhakim Alimi: Chikh Trab
- 2002: Itr Al Ghadhab by Habib Mselmani and Ridha Kaham: Moncef Neji
- 2003: Ikhwa wa Zaman by Hamadi Arafa, Wajiha Jendoubi and Dhafer Neji: Ali
- 2005: Halloula w Sallouma by Ibrahim Letaief and Fares Naânaâ: Halloula's father
- 2006:
  - Hayet Wa Amani by Mohamed Ghodhbane and Jamel Eddine Khelif
  - Hkeyet El Aroui
- 2007: Layali el bidh (ar) (guest of honor of episode 18): the commissioner
- 2008: Choufli Hal by Slaheddine Essid and Abdelkader Jerbi (guest of honor of episodes 29 and 30 of season 4): Omrane
- 2009: Achek Assarab: Noureddine Lasmer
- 2009–2011: Njoum Ellil by Madih Belaid, Amir Majouli and Mehdi Nasra
- 2010: Min Ayyem Maliha by Abdelkader Jerbi
- 2011: Master Malek by Fraj Slama: Hassan Ben Moumen
- 2012: Onkoud El Ghadhab by Naim Ben Rhouma, Hichem Akermi and Abdelkader Bel Hadj Nasser
- 2013:
  - Layem by Khaled Barsaoui, Jamil Najjar and Tahar Fazaâ
  - Awled Lebled (pilot episode) by Slim Ben Hafsa and Yassine Cherif
  - Yawmiyet Aloulou (Guest of honor of episode 15) by Kamel Youssef, Tarek Ben Hjal and Béchir Mannai: Salah
- 2015:
  - More beautiful life (season 11: Bonus: debt of honor) by Didier Albert: Kader
  - Tunisian stories by Nada Mezni Hafaiedh (guest of honor)

- 2016:
  - Madrasat Arasoul by Anouar Ayachi and Ali Eddeb: Omar Ibn Abdelaziz
  - Awled Moufida by Sami Fehri and Saoussen Jemni
  - Flashback by Mourad Ben Cheikh
  - Dima Ashab by Abdelkader Jerbi: Hmaida
- 2017: Dawama by Naim Ben Rhouma, Mohamed Ali Mihoub and Abdelmonem Haouas: Ibrahim, Yousra's father
- 2018: Washing of Nabil Bessaida, Seifeddine Dhrif and Mariem Ben Jemai: Sadok, Racha's father
- 2019: Ali Chouerreb (season 2) by Madih Belaid, Rania Mlika and Rabii Takeli
- 2024: Fallujah (Guest of honor of episodes 1, 16 and 19 of season 2) by Saoussen Jemni: Farhat, director of a rural school
- 2024 : Beb Rezk by Heifel Ben Youssef

== TV movies ==
- 2006: Abd ar-Raḥmān ibn Khaldūn by Habib Mselmani
- 2007: Powerful by Habib Mselmani

== Theater ==
- 2004: Portraits (Choukhouss), text by Abdelbaki Mehri and direction by Ali Khemiri
- 2012: Crazy Carthage (Al Jamâa) by Hédi Oueld Baballah, text by Béchir Chaâbouni and Hédi Ben Amor
