= Agrebi =

Agrebi is a surname. Notable people with the surname include:

- Fatma Agrebi (born 1990), Tunisian volleyball player
- Hamza Agrebi (born 1991), Tunisian footballer
- Mohamed Agrebi (born 1961), Tunisian politician
- Saida Agrebi (born 1945), Tunisian politician
- Slim Agrebi (born 1974), Tunisian judoka
