= Twenty Years of African Cinema =

1983 film

- Directed by: Férid Boughedir
- Written by: Férid Boughedir
- Produced by: Férid Boughedir
- Cinematography: Charly Meunies; Sékou Ouedraogo
- Edited by: Andrée Davanture; Juliana Sánchez
- Release date: 1983
- Running time: 95 minutes
- Country: Tunisia
- Language: French

Twenty Years of African Cinema (French: Caméra d'Afrique) is a 1983 Tunisian documentary film directed by Férid Boughedir.

== Synopsis ==
The film (as the title suggests) looks back at 20 years of African cinema featuring interviews with pioneering independent filmmakers such as Sembene Ousmane and Djibril Diop Mambéty overcoming obstacles (lack of funds and support) to tell authentic African stories after years of the continent being a backdrop for Westernized cinema full of depictions of its people as inhuman.

== Legacy ==
It was screened in the Un Certain Regard section at the 1983 Cannes Film Festival. In April 2019, a restored version of the film was selected to be shown in the Cannes Classics section at the 2019 Cannes Film Festival.

== See also ==
- Third World Cinema
- Colonialism
