= Rim Zribi =

Tunisian actress

- ريم الزريبي
- Occupation: Actress

Rim Zribi (Arabic: ريم الزريبي) is a Tunisian actress.

== Television ==
- 1999 - 2000 : Rih El Misk by Hamadi Arafa : Ibtissem
- 2001 : Malla Ena (What Am I!) by Abdelkader Jerbi
- 2005 : Chaâbane fi Ramadhane by Selma Baccar : Zlaykha
- 2006+2007+2008 : Choufli Hal (Find Me A solution Seasons 2-3-4–5) by Slaheddine Essid : Fayka named Foufa
- 2012 :
  - Bab El Hara 2100 by Haifa Mohamed Araar & Anis Ben Dali : Carlos' Mother
  - Dar Louzir (The Minister's House) by Slaheddine Essid & Younes Ferhi
- 2014 : Ayla Tounsia (A Tunisian Family) by Slimane Chaouche
- 2015 : The Risk by Nasreddine Shili & Mohamed Ali Damak
- 2017 : Dawama (The Whirlpool) by Naim Ben Rhouma, Mohamed Ali Mihoub & Abdelmonem Hwass : Adila
- 2021 - 2022 : Ken Ya Makenech (Once Upon A Time) by Abdelhamid Bouchnak : Fedha

== Theater ==
- 1982 : Sahra Taht El Soor, written by Samir Ayadi and directed by Béchir Drissi and Hamadi Arafa
- 2009 : Hira w Tchitine, written and directed by Zouhair Erraies
- 2010 : Ija wahdek, directed by Ikram Azzouz and Fethi Mselmani
- 2011 : Ellil Zéhi, adaptation and direction by Farhat Jedid
- 2013 : Ahwal, text and staging by Mohamed Kouka
- 2014 : 24h ultimatum, written by Jalel Eddine Saadi and directed by Mongi Ben Hafsia
- 2015 : Dhalamouni Habaybi, directed by Abdelaziz Meherzi
- 2016 : Cauchemar by Eugène Marin Labiche and directed by Zouhair Erraies
