= Talfaza Jaya =

- Directed by: Moncef Dhouib
- Screenplay by: Moncef Dhouib
- Produced by: Manara Productions
- Starring: Taoufik Bahri Raouf Ben Amor Fatma Ben Saïdane Ammar Bouthelja Nouri Bouzid
- Cinematography: Ahmed Bennys
- Edited by: Charlène Gravel
- Music by: Rabii Zammouri
- Release date: 2006
- Running time: 95'
- Country: Tunisia

Talfaza Jaya is a 2006 film.

== Synopsis ==
Malga is a quiet village in the South of Tunisia that beats to the rhythm of the national holidays for which the Cultural Committee proposes the same program year after year. However, a phone call from the capital warns them that this year a German TV crew is going to visit the area. The Cultural Committee decides it has to offer a positive image of the village, and the country, and dives head-first into a tremendous work of set dressing to conceal the truth.
