= Wajiha Jendoubi =

Tunisian actress and comedian (born 1972)

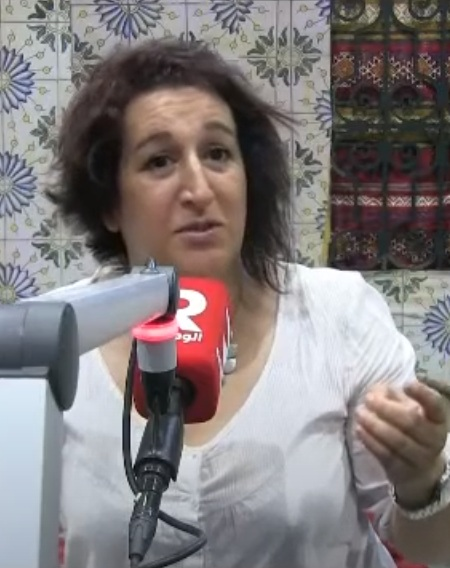
- Wajiha Jendoubi interviewed by Tunnisian Radio Nationale, June 2017
- Born: 1972 (age 53–54)
- Occupations: Actress, comedian

Wajiha Jendoubi (born 1972) is a Tunisian actress and comedian.

== Biography ==
Jendoubi was born in 1972. Originally from Kairouan, she finished her theatrical studies in 1995. For her graduation project, Jendoubi wrote a play alongside another student and played the role of a future bride, which she described as unforgettable. She was quickly noticed by Tunisian directors and appeared in several television soap operas such as Mnamet Aroussia, Ikhwa wa Zaman and Aoudat Al Minyar, the last of which is her best-known work. In 2010, she appeared in The Season of Men.

Jendoubi performed the one-woman-show Madame Kenza in 2010. She discovered the pleasure of being the only person on the stage, and her goal was to hold her audience in suspense, having fun and bringing out whatever she felt.

In 2015, she was appointed alongside Myriam Belkadhi and Emna Louzyr Ayari as a representative of Tunisia for the Convention on the Elimination of All Forms of Discrimination Against Women.

In 2017, Jendoubi starred as Bahja in Salma Baccar's film El Jaida. She was named an officer of the Order of the Republic in 2019. In December 2019, Jendoubi claimed that she was not paid by Attessia TV for her performances in the shows Le Président, Flashback and Ali Chouerreb.

She is married and the mother of two children. Her husband Mehdi is in charge of sound and light during her shows. When the Arab Spring began in Tunisia, Jendoubi was initially supportive but noticed darkness appearing. In response to the violent religious extremism that developed, she created a comedy show as a way of combatting it in post-revolution Tunisia.

== Filmography ==
=== Cinema ===
- 2000: The Season of Men by Moufida Tlatli: Salwa
- 2001: Fatma by Khaled Ghorbal
- 2010: Dirty laundry (short film) by Malik Amara: Jamila
- 2016: Spring perfume by Férid Boughedir
- 2017: El Jaida by Salma Baccar: Bahja
- 2019: Porto Farina by Ibrahim Letaïef: Monia
- 2025 : Parasol : Lilia

=== Television ===
==== Series ====
- 1998: Îchqa wa Hkayet by Slaheddine Essid: Chrifa
- 2000: Mnamet Aroussia by Slaheddine Essid: Lilia Thabti-Chared
- 2002: Gamret Sidi Mahrous by Slaheddine Essid: Sabiha Souilah
- 2003: Ikhwa wa Zaman (Brothers and time) by Hamadi Arafa: Souad
- 2004: Loutil (The hotel) by Slaheddine Essid: Dorra
- 2005: Aoudat Al Minyar by Habib Mselmani: Rakia
- 2009: Aqfas Bila Touyour (ar) (Cages without birds) by Ezzeddine Harbaoui
- 2010: Garage Lekrik by Ridha Béhi
- 2012: Dipanini by Hatem Bel Hadj
- 2013: Yawmiyat Imraa (A lady's diary) by Khalida Chibeni: Daliya
- 2015: Naouret El Hawa (season 2) by Madih Belaid: Safia
- 2016: Nsibti Laaziza (season 6) (My beloved mother-in-law) by Slaheddine Essid and Younes Ferhi: Rafika
- 2016: The President of Jamil Najjar
- 2016: Bolice 2.0 by Majdi Smiri
- 2017: Dawama by Naim Ben Rhouma : Zayneb Kadri
- 2017: The Hairdresser (ar) by Zied Litayem
- 2017: Flashback (season 2) by Mourad Ben Cheikh
- 2019: El Maestro by Lassaad Oueslati
- 2019: Ali Chouerreb (season 2) by Madih Belaid and Rabii Tekali: Ms. Abid
- 2020: The Seamstress by Zied Litayem
- 2021-2022: Harga (ar) by Lassaad Oueslati: Naâma
- 2025:
  - Arrière El Goddem S1 by Bassem Hamraoui: Fatma
  - Oued El Bey by Raouia Marmouch
- 2026 :
  - Arrière El Goddem S2 by Bassem Hamraoui: Fatma
  - Beb Bnet : Sabria

==== Dubbing ====
- 2009-2013: Tunis 2050 by Sami Faour: Aziza (voice)

=== Theater ===
- 2007: Bitter words, text by Dhafer Néji and direction by Chedly Arfaoui
- 2008: Madame Kenza, text and direction by Moncef Dhouib
- 2013: Ifcha, mon amour, text and direction by Chedly Arfaoui and Wajiha Jendoubi
- 2019: Big Bossa, text and direction by Wajiha Jendoubi

=== Distinctions ===
- Officer of the Order of the Republic (Tunisia).
