= Hedi Zaiem =

Tunisian radio and television presenter

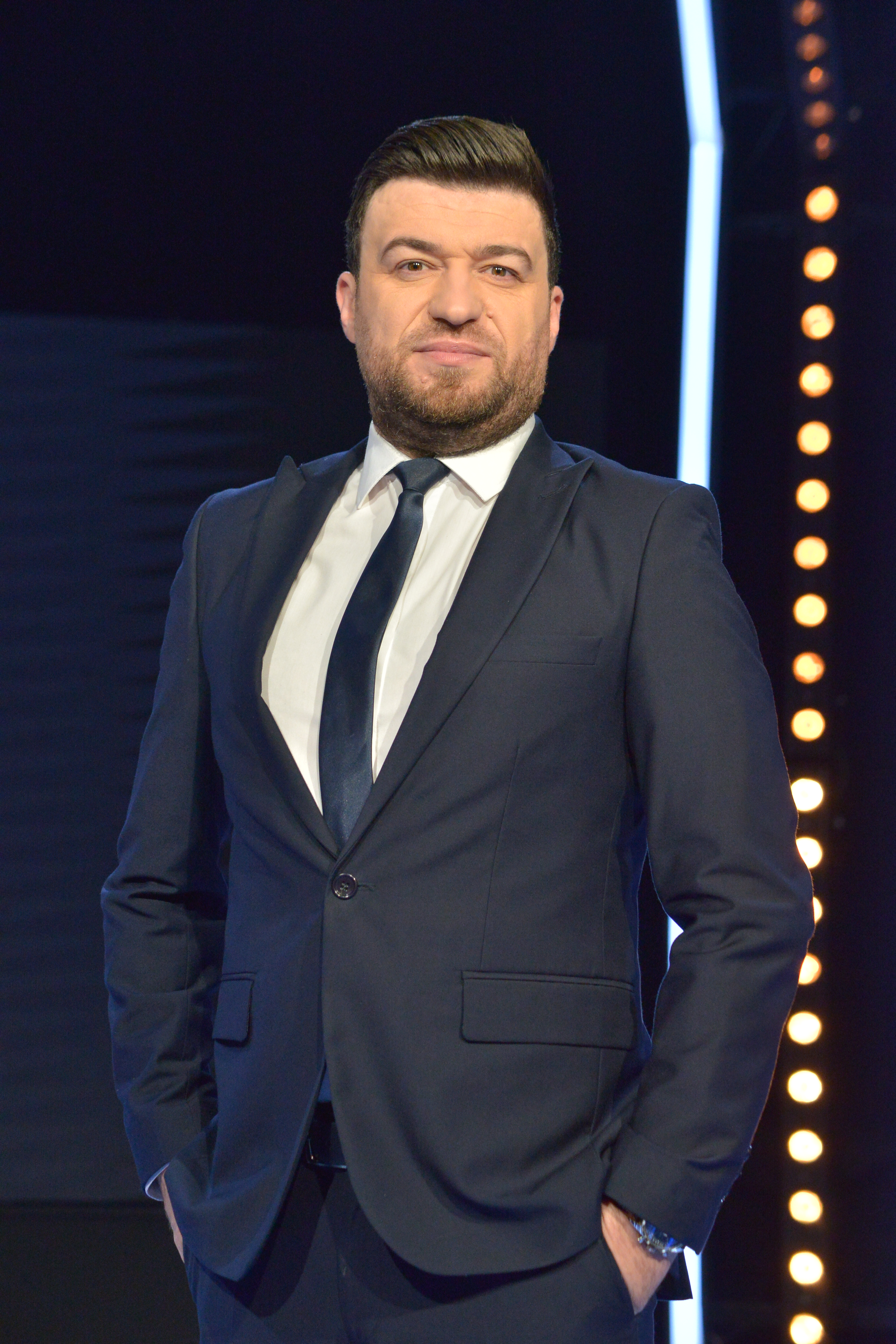
- Hedi Zaiem in 2021
- Born: 8 December 1976 (age 48); Bizerte, Tunisia
- Occupation(s): Tv and radio producer/presenter

Hedi Zaiem (Arabic: الهادي زعيم), (born December 8, 1976, in Ras Jebel Bizerte), is a Tunisian media personality who came to prominence as a host on Radio Mosaïque FM and El Hiwar El Tounsi.

== Biography ==
It was at the age of 19 that he landed his first radio job as a host on his first radio show "Melomane", broadcast every Saturday evening (1999–2003).

After graduating from high school, Hedi Zaiem dreamed of obtaining a degree in journalism, but instead of realizing his dream, he changed direction and chose to continue his studies in law and political science.

== Career ==
=== Radio career ===
Starting in 2004 Hedi worked as an external collaborator on Mosaïque FM, this ended in November 2019.

=== Television career ===
Zaiem hosted the show "Fekret Sami Fehri" on El Hiwar El Tounsi. He presented the show 90 ′ on El Hiwar El Tounsi.
