= Faouzi Benzarti =

Tunisian football player and coach

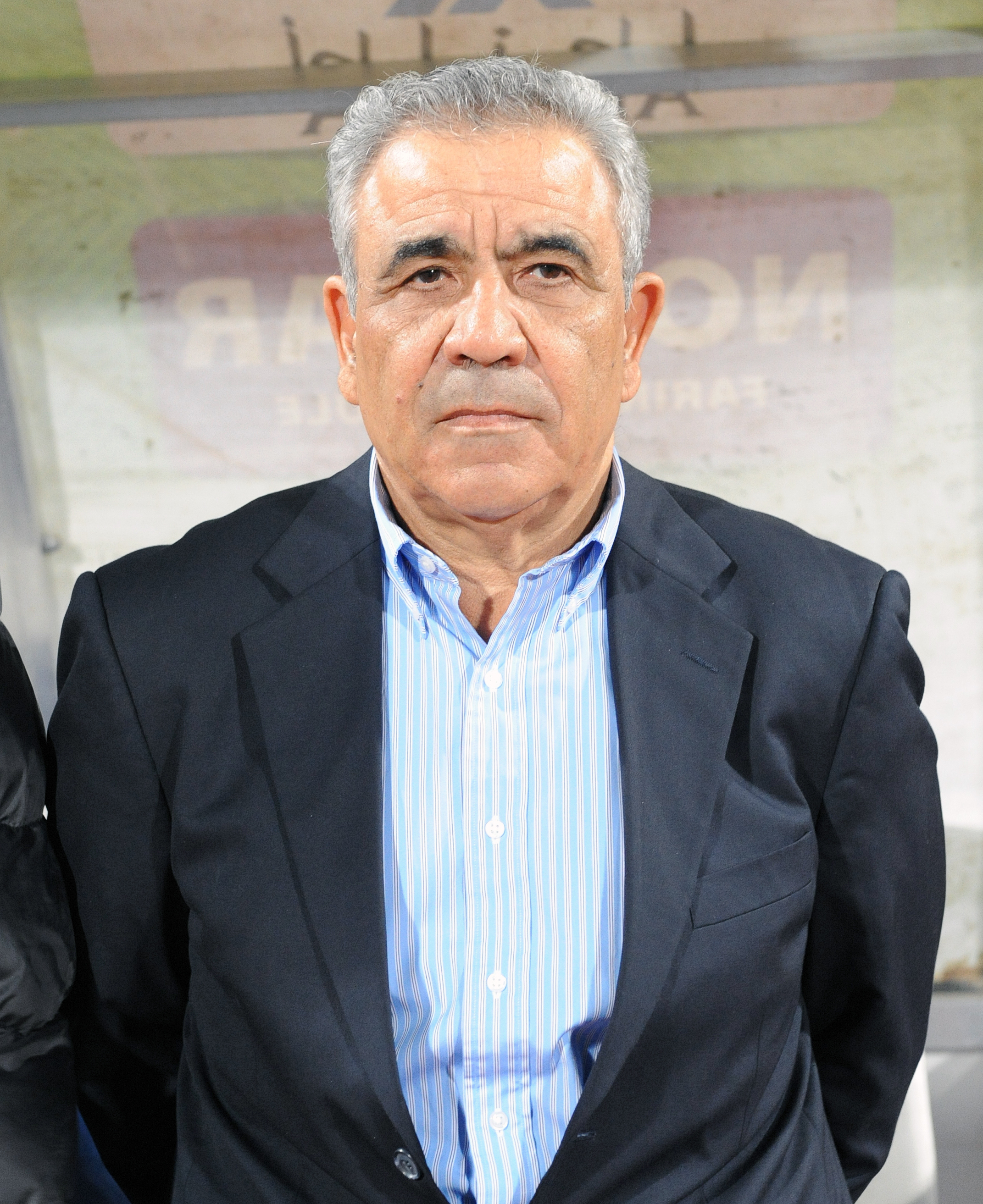
- Benzarti as Raja CA manager in 2014

Personal information
- Date of birth: 3 January 1950 (age 76)
- Place of birth: Monastir, Tunisia
- Position: Midfielder

Team information
- Current team: Al-Ittihad SC (manager)

Senior career*
Years	Team	Apps	(Gls)
1968–1978	US Monastir		

Managerial career
- 1979–1982: US Monastir
- 1986–1987: Étoile du Sahel
- 1989–1990: Club Africain
- 1991–1992: Étoile du Sahel
- 1992–1993: US Monastir
- 1993–1994: Espérance de Tunis
- 1994: Tunisia
- 1995–1996: CS Sfaxien
- 1999–2000: Club Africain
- 2001: Sharjah
- 2002–2003: Stade Tunisien
- 2003: Espérance de Tunis
- 2005–2006: US Monastir
- 2006–2007: Étoile du Sahel
- 2007: Espérance de Tunis
- 2007–2008: Libya
- 2008–2010: ES Tunis
- 2010: Tunisia
- 2010–2011: Tunisia
- 2011: Club Africain
- 2012: Étoile du Sahel
- 2012: Sharjah
- 2012: Ittihad Kalba
- 2013–2014: Raja CA
- 2014–2017: Étoile du Sahel
- 2017: Espérance de Tunis
- 2018: Wydad AC
- 2018: Tunisia
- 2018–2019: Wydad AC
- 2019: Étoile du Sahel
- 2019–2020: Libya
- 2020: CS Sfaxien
- 2020–2021: Wydad AC
- 2021–2022: US Monastir
- 2022: Al Ahly Benghazi
- 2022: Raja CA
- 2022–2023: MC Alger
- 2023: Étoile du Sahel
- 2023–2024: Wydad AC
- 2024: Club Africain
- 2024: Tunisia
- 2025: US Monastir
- 2025–2026: Club Africain
- 2026-: Al-Ittihad SC
- * Club domestic league appearances and goals

Faouzi Benzarti (Arabic: فَوْزِيّ الْبِنْزَرْتِيّ; born 3 January 1950) is a Tunisian professional football manager and former player and current manager. He spent his entire career as a player at his home club US Monastir without any achievements. His coaching career began when he was only 29 years old, making him the youngest Tunisian coach at the time. He is considered one of the most successful coaches in Tunisia. He usually uses offensive play and a high-pressure plans as he is known for his toughness in training and his excessive anger towards his players and referees. During his managerial career, he was in charge of two national teams: the Tunisian and Libyan national football teams, he was also close to signing with the Moroccan team in 2016 before appointing Hervé Renard.

Benzarti managed clubs in Tunisia, Morocco, Oman and United Arab Emirates. The Tunisian clubs he won most titles with are Étoile du Sahel and Espérance de Tunis. Otherwise, His experiences in the Persian Gulf region were not successful. He achieved good results in Morocco, whether with Raja CA and Wydad Casablanca. Benzarti was chosen as the ninth best African coach of all time. His most important achievement was reaching the final of the 2013 FIFA Club World Cup with Raja CA.

== Early life and education ==
Faouzi Benzarti was born on 3 January 1950 in the city of Monastir, central coast of Tunisia, into a sports family. He attended primary and secondary education in Monastir, then joined the Higher Institute of Sports of Tunis and graduated from it in 1975. He worked as a physical education teacher at many Tunisian institutes from 1975 to 1977, and after obtaining a football coach certificate he decided to devote himself entirely to training.

== Playing career ==
Prior to his coaching career, Benzerti developed his career as an attacking midfielder and spent his entire 10-year career in his home team US Monastir since he was 18 years old in 1968 to 1978. He did not play for the Tunisian team.

== Coaching career ==
=== Beginning & success with Tunisian clubs (1979–1994) ===
He began his career at Olympique Sidi Bouzid before returning to US Monastir, which he coached in 1979-1980, enabling him to return to Ligue I. In his first experience with Étoile du Sahel in the 1986-1987 season, he won the Tunisian league title and then the 1987 Tunisian Super Cup. In 1990 he coached and led the Club Africain in the same year to win the league title and reach the final of the 1990 African Cup Winners' Cup. Benzarti coached Espérance de Tunis in 1993 and crowned him with the Tunisian League, 1994 African Cup of Champions Clubs and the CAF Super Cup.

=== Tunisian team & first experience outside Tunisia (1994–2002) ===
In March 1994, he was appointed as Tunisia national football team coach in the second match of 1994 African Cup of Nations hosted by Tunisia after the dismissal of Youssef Zouaoui who failed in the opening match against Mali. He also signed with CS Sfaxien in June 1996 but soon left before the season to play his first overseas experience at the head of the Emirati Club Al-Shaab CSC. It was not a successful experience as the team finished in seventh place in 1998–99 UAE Football League. Faouzi Benzarti returned to the Club Africain in 1999 and reached the final of the 1999 African Cup Winners' Cup. He made a brief pass as coach of Stade Tunisien in 2001 with unconvincing results.

=== Great success with Étoile and Espérance (2003–2007) ===
He was appointed as coach of Espérance de Tunis in 2003 and won the 2002–03 Tunisian Ligue Professionnelle 1. He signed with Étoile du Sahel in April 2006 and achieved impressive results in winning the 2006–07 Tunisian Ligue Professionnelle 1, 2006 CAF Confederation Cup and obtaining the silver medal in the 2006 CAF Super Cup. After his involvement with Étoile du Sahel in 2006, Benzarti transferred to Espérance de Tunis in June 2007, but left soon after to manage the national team of Libya.

=== Libyan National Team (2007–2009) ===
On 11 July 2007, he became the new head coach of the Libyan team. He led the team in their last match of 2008 African Cup of Nations qualification and drew with DR Congo (1–1) in Kinshasa.

After a series of friendly matches against Egypt, Zambia and Saudi Arabia, he began the 2010 FIFA World Cup qualification with a 0–3 defeat by Ghana. But then he made a positive streak and was close to qualifying for the third round of qualification before being defeated against Gabon in the last game. Benzarti remained in charge of the Libyan side after a good performance in World Cup qualifiers but returned to Tunisia in March 2009 to coach Espérance.

=== Return to Espérance & temporary coaching of Tunisia (2009–2010) ===
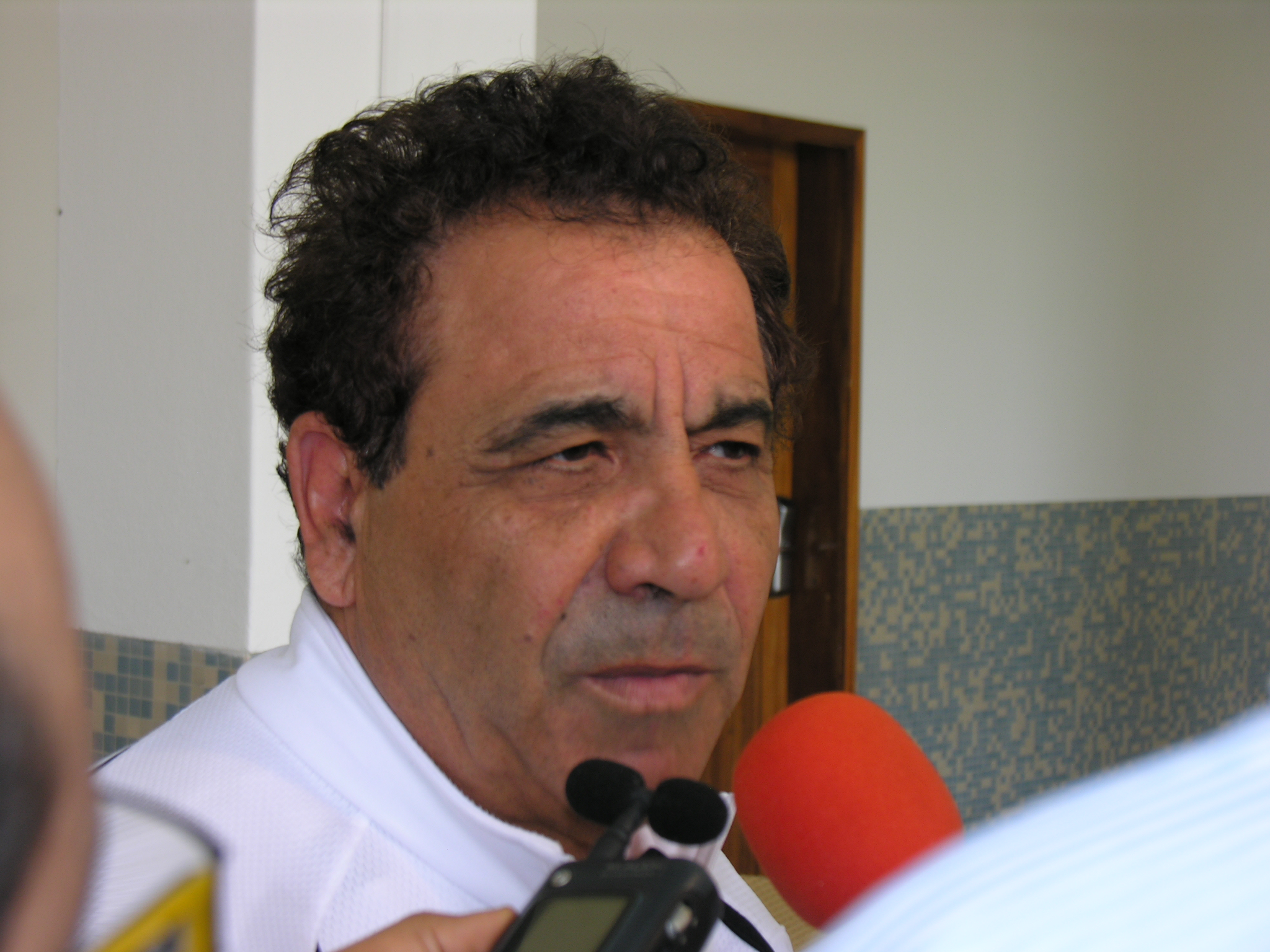
Benzarti talking to the press for 2010 African Cup in Angola

After returning to Espérance de Tunis, he won the Tunisian League twice in 2009 and 2010 becoming the most winning coach of Tunisian Leagues, he won also the Arab Champions League for the same year and reached the final of the 2010 CAF Champions League but was defeated by TP Mazembe. Following the failure of the national team, under the leadership of Humberto Coelho, to qualify for the finals of the 2010 FIFA World Cup, he was removed from office on 18 November 2009 and replaced by Benzarti, who kept his duties at Espérance until November 2010, when his assistant Maher Kanzari replaced him. He coached the Tunisian team in the 2010 African Cup of Nations in Angola.

=== Experiences in the Persian Gulf & weak results (2010–2013) ===
On 17 May 2011, Benzarti signed a two-year contract with Club Africain after one week the club sacked former coach Kais Yâakoubi. Accepting of the contract offered, he became a manager of the Club Africain for three times in his career. and reached the final of 2011 CAF Confederation Cup.

On 26 March 2012, Faouzi Benzarti replaced Bernd Krauss as Étoile coach, The Tunisian journeyman coach went back to Sousse for a fourth time in his trophy filled career as German Bernd Krauss returned to his post of youth technical director.

He then did a short experience in the Persian Gulf region with Omani club Al-Shaab and Emirati club Sharjah FC with little achievements.

=== Outstanding results with Raja (2013–2014) ===
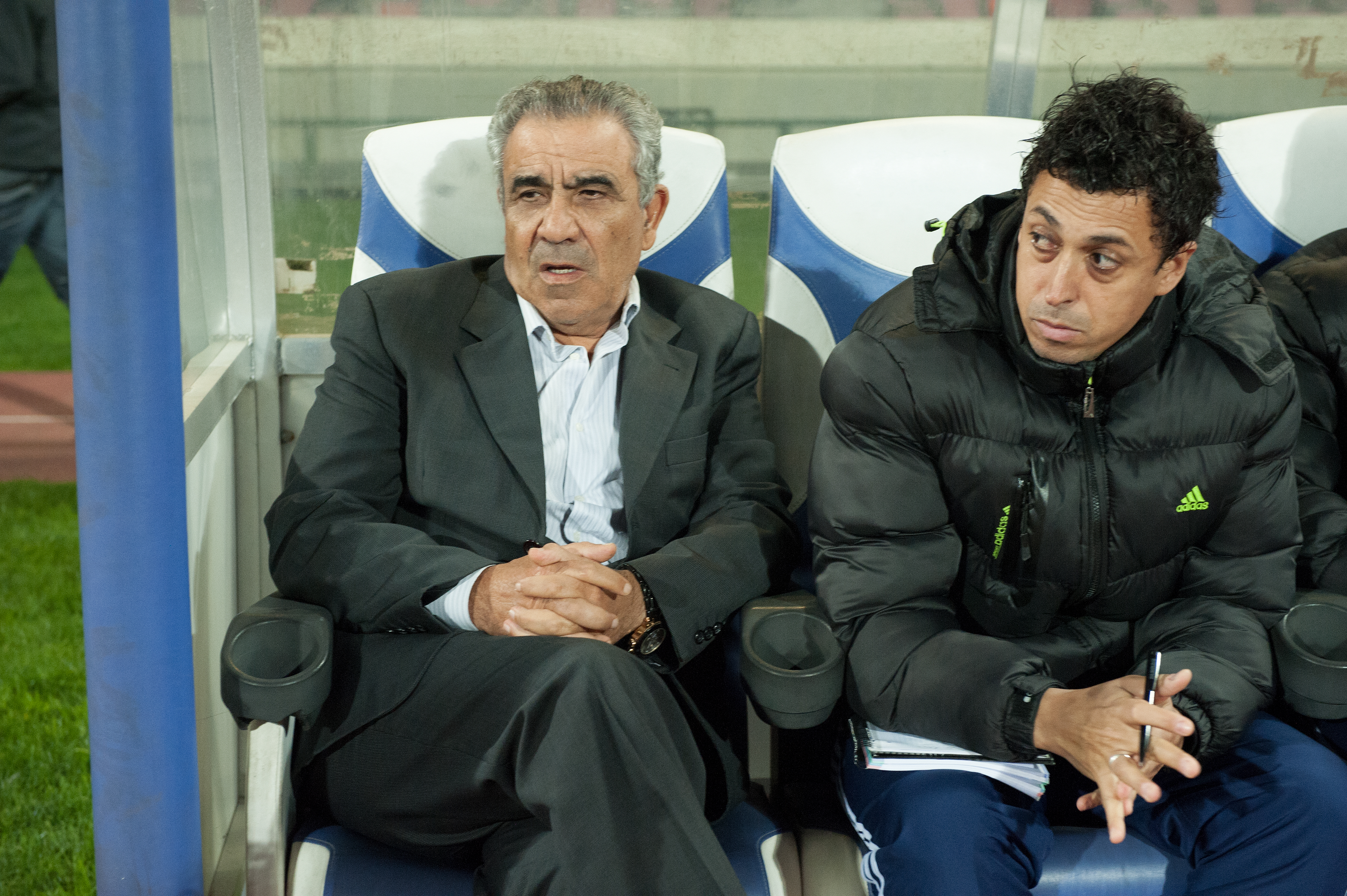
Benzarti as Raja CA manager in 2014.

At the end of 2013, Benzarti joined the Moroccan champions, Raja Casablanca, a week before the start of the 2013 FIFA Club World Cup. He managed to reach the final against Bayern Munich by defeating the champions of several continents like Atletico Mineiro where Brazilian Ronaldinho was playing, as well as CF Monterrey and Auckland City FC. Subsequently, he was decorated by King Mohammed VI of Morocco with the entire team. In the local league, Benzarti gave Raja Casablanca a very offensive game, unlike his predecessor Mohamed Fakhir who preferred defense. Benzarti added its personal touch by imposing an offensive game with 4-4-2 or 4-3-3 formation, which sometimes involved the use of two advanced attackers. Result of this work, the team managed to beat his rival, Wydad Casablanca, at the Casablanca derby (2-0) and then defeated the leader of the championship (5-0), but the club finally bowed at the last day against the Olympic Club de Safi, being vice-champions of 2013–14 Botola at a point of the first rank. At the end of the season, Benzarti left the club for financial reasons.

=== Other success with Étoile and Espérance (2014–2017) ===
On 12 August 2014, he took charge of Étoile du Sahel after the dismissal of Dragan Cvetković. In 2016, he was crowned champions of Tunisia with Étoile. He won the 2014-15 Tunisian Cup for the first time in his career and 2015 CAF Confederation Cup. Moreover, he reached the final of 2016 CAF Super Cup. However, a suspension was imposed on him following a violent clash with the Espérance de Tunis doctor during the quarterfinals of the Tunisian Cup, leading to his departure at the end of the year and his return to Espérance.

In this period he won the Tunisian League for the second time in a row but with two different teams. During the same period, Espérance managed to win the 2017 Arab Club Championship title.

In December 2017, he decided to leave his position as coach of Espérance Sportive de Tunis. Benzarti said he would not coach Tunisian clubs in the future after the elimination of Espérance from the quarter-final of 2017 CAF Champions League against Al Ahly.

=== Brilliance with Wydad & third term with Tunisia (2018–2019) ===
The African Champion, Wydad Casablanca has signed a contract with Benzarti on 19 January 2018 for a year and a half after the bad start at the Moroccan League with Hussein Ammouta. The team was able to win the 2018 CAF Super Cup and was able to return the team to compete for the title before finishing second behind IR Tanger. The campaign to defend his title in 2018 CAF Champions League was also successful as they won Williamsville AC, AS Togo-Port and Horoya AC. But Benzarti suddenly resigned for coaching the Tunisian national team.

On 28 July 2018, the Tunisian Football Federation announced the appointment of Faouzi Benzarti as coach of the national team, following Nabil Maaloul who resigned after failing in 2018 FIFA World Cup. The contract for the two-year contract can be renewed. He will lead the team in the 2019 Africa Cup of Nations qualification.

However, he was dismissed in October after three wins and qualifying for 2019 Africa Cup of Nations after disagreement with the president of the Tunisian Football Federation Wadie Jary for refusing his interferences in the trainings.

In November 2018, he signed a new contract for a season and a half with the Moroccan club of Wydad Casablanca. He was able to achieve good results after winning the Moroccan League after a fight with the rivals Raja Casablanca and he also reached the final of the African Champions League to play with his compatriot Espérance de Tunis before resigning due to refereeing problems that led to the postponement of the final.

Otherwise, He went through a short experience with Étoile du Sahel in late 2019 replacing Roger Lemerre, but it did not last long due to the eliminations from the Arab championship, which the team was holders in addition to the loss of the title of the Tunisian Cup.

=== Second tenure with Libya and Wydad (2019–2021) ===
On 25 October 2019, Benzarti was appointed as coach of Libya on a six-month renewable contract, following the first spell between 2007 and 2009. Less than a month after taking office, the 2021 Africa Cup of Nations qualification began and opened with a match against his country, where they were beaten 4–1 in Radès. four days later, he played his second match against Tanzania and won 2–1. Then the matches were postponed after the COVID-19 pandemic, and he left his post in May 2020.

He had a short experience with CS Sfaxien in the same year, before returning to Wydad Casablanca for a second term. This term was known by his second title of the Moroccan League, after he had previously achieved it in 2019 with the same team. He reached the semi-finals of the CAF Champions League. The contract was terminated between the two parties at the end of the season after withdrawing from the Moroccan Throne Cup from the semi-finals.

=== Short experiences in the Maghreb (2021–) ===
After that, Benzarti entered into short experiences for some months in Tunisia or in various other teams from the Maghreb in Libya, Algeria and Morocco. He signed with his home team, US Monastir, on 4 October 2021 to lead them in the Tunisian league. He led them to second place and participation in the CAF Champions League for the first time in their history. Then he had a short experience at Al-Ahly Benghazi.

On 7 July 2022, the president of Raja Club Athletic Aziz El Badraoui announced the arrival of Benzarti. The return of the Tunisian coach was eagerly awaited by supporters after his memorable journey with th club in the 2013-2014 season.

On 25 September 2022, Benzarti was appointed as coach of MC Alger.

In 2023, he returned to Tunisia and succeeded in winning the league with Étoile du Sahel for the first time since he was coach in 2016. Then he was contracted to coach Wydad AC for the third time.

On May 12, 2024, he became the coach of Club Africain.

== Personal life ==
Benzarti is married and has children. His son is his agent who negotiates with teams that want to hire him. He is the older brother of Lotfi Benzarti who is one of the most important Tunisian coaches. His sister is married to the popular Tunisian actor Sofiene Chaari.

Politically, he led an independent list, called "Audacity and Ambition", for the Tunisian Constituent Assembly election on 23 October 2011. He joined the party of Nidaa Tounes and supported Beji Caid Essebsi in the Tunisian presidential election, 2014.

== Managerial statistics ==
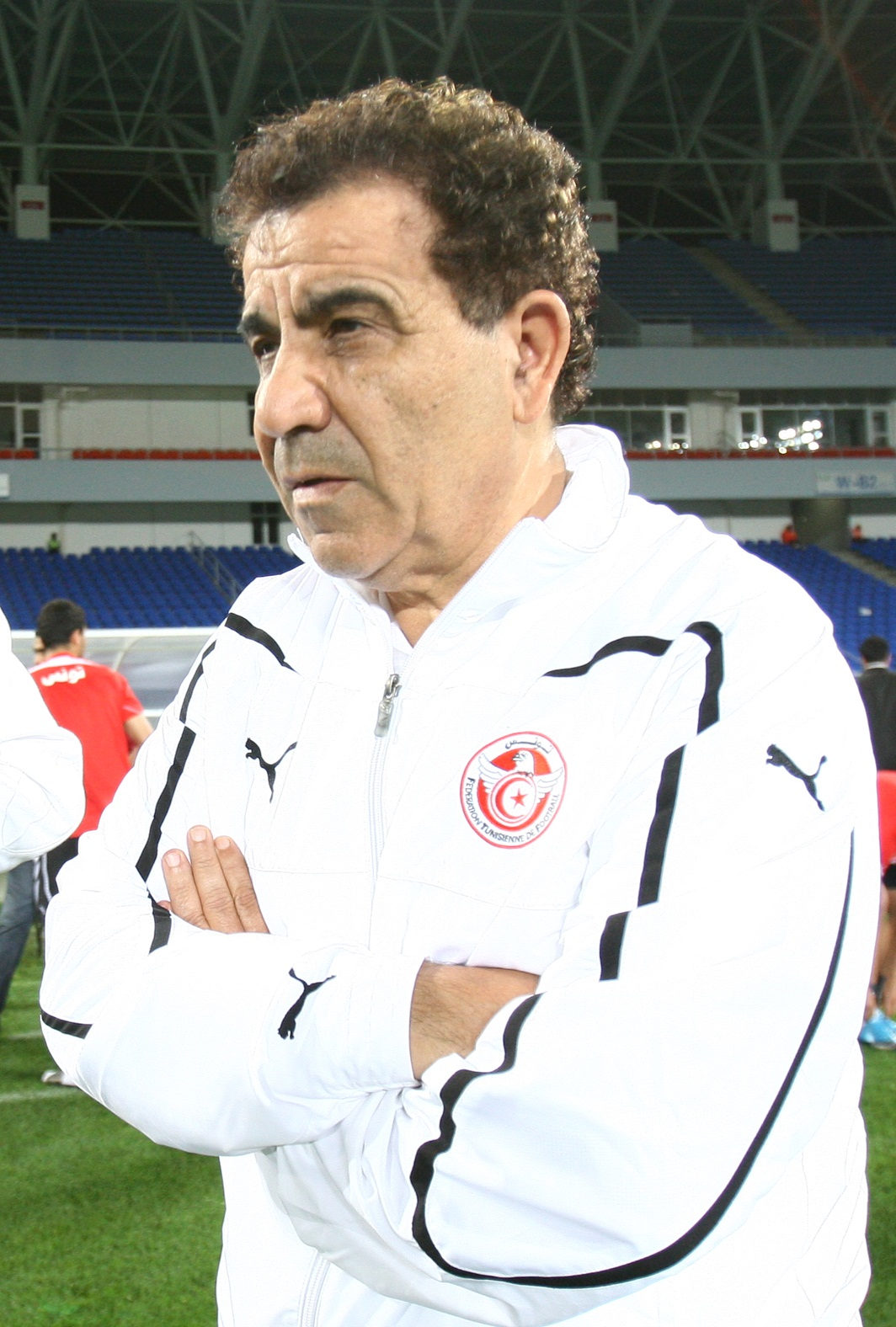
Benzarti is the only coach to take charge of Tunisia national team in three terms.

As of match played 12 March 2024

Managerial record by team and tenure
Team	From	To	Record				
Team	From	To	G	W	D	L	Win %
(Tunisia) Étoile du Sahel	30 June 1991	30 May 1992	28	9	11	8	32.14
(Tunisia) Espérance de Tunis	1 July 1993	13 July 1994	43	33	8	2	76.74
(Tunisia) US Monastir	10 June 2005	1 May 2006	26	11	8	7	42.31
(Tunisia) Étoile du Sahel	13 April 2006	30 May 2007	33	20	9	4	60.61
(Tunisia) Espérance de Tunis	1 July 2007	13 July 2007	1	0	0	1	0.00
Libya	11 July 2007	8 March 2009	18	8	4	6	44.44
(Tunisia) Espérance de Tunis	8 March 2009	1 December 2010	65	42	13	10	64.62
Tunisia	23 November 2009	23 January 2010	4	0	3	1	0.00
(United Arab Emirates) Sharjah FC	9 June 2012	19 November 2012	10	7	2	1	70.00
(Morocco) Raja CA	5 December 2013	29 May 2014	27	18	3	6	66.67
(Tunisia) Étoile du Sahel	12 August 2014	3 January 2017	115	74	24	17	64.35
(Tunisia) Espérance de Tunis	3 January 2017	24 December 2017	44	29	12	3	65.91
(Morocco) Wydad Casablanca	19 January 2018	28 July 2018	23	14	7	2	60.87
Tunisia	28 July 2018	20 October 2018	3	3	0	0	100.00
(Morocco) Wydad Casablanca	27 November 2018	5 July 2019	37	20	10	7	54.05
(Tunisia) Étoile du Sahel	5 July 2019	25 September 2019	7	1	2	4	14.29
Libya	24 October 2019	22 May 2020	2	1	0	1	50.00
(Tunisia) CS Sfaxien	28 August 2020	13 November 2020	7	3	3	1	42.86
(Morocco) Wydad Casablanca	15 November 2020	2 August 2021	46	29	11	6	63.04
(Tunisia) US Monastir	4 October 2021	26 June 2022	17	8	5	4	47.06
(Libya) Al-Ahly SC	29 June 2022	27 July 2022	5	1	1	3	20.00
(Morocco) Raja CA	1 August 2022	21 September 2022	3	0	2	1	0.00
(Algeria) MC Alger	25 September 2022	15 February 2023	14	6	4	4	42.86
(Tunisia) Étoile du Sahel	28 February 2023	25 July 2023	14	9	4	1	64.29
(Morocco) Wydad Casablanca	15 December 2023	15 March 2024	16	5	5	6	31.25
(Tunisia) Club Africain	12 May 2024	30 June 2024	6	2	2	2	33.33
Tunisia	1 July 2024	22 October 2024	4	2	1	1	50.00
(Tunisia) US Monastir	5 February 2025	present	17	11	5	1	64.71
Total			638	367	160	111	57.52

== Honours ==
Espérance de Tunis

- Tunisian Ligue Professionnelle 1: 1993–94, 2002–03, 2008–09, 2009–10, 2016–17
- Tunisian Super Cup: 1994
- CAF Champions League: 1994; runner-up: 2010
- CAF Super Cup: 1995
- Arab Club Champions Cup: 1993, 2008–09, 2017

Étoile du Sahel

- Tunisian Ligue Professionnelle 1: 1986–87, 2006–07, 2015–16, 2022–23
- Tunisian Cup: 2014–15; runner-up: 2018–19
- Tunisian Super Cup: 1987
- CAF Confederation Cup: 2006, 2015

Club Africain

- Tunisian Ligue Professionnelle 1: 1989–90, 2025–26
- CAF Confederation Cup runner-up: 2011

Wydad AC

- Moroccan League: 2018–19, 2020–21
- CAF Super Cup: 2018
- CAF Champions League runner-up: 2018–19

Raja CA

- FIFA Club World Cup runner-up: 2013
- Botola runner-up: 2014

US Monastir

- Tunisian Ligue Professionnelle 1 runner-up: 2021–22

Libya

- Arab Games runner-up: 2007

Individual honours :

- Commander of the National Order of Merit of Tunisia
- Officer of the Order of Civil Merit of Morocco
- Ninth best African coach of all time according to the Confederation of African Football
- Award of "Best African Coach" from the Nigeria Football Federation
