= Tunisia TV 1 =

- Country: Tunisia
- Broadcast area: Tunisia
- Headquarters: Tunisia

History
- Launched: 1 June 2010; 14 years ago

Links
- Website: www.tt1tv.net

Tunisia TV 1 (Arabic: تلفزة تونس 1, is a young satellite station, a broadcast experimental through the Internet.TT1 is young, made by young people and youth service, as the Chairman says. Tunisia Television 1 intends to become the first TV on the southern shore of the Mediterranean.

The channel was launched by Tarek Bachraoui on 1 June 2010 after several years of waiting for a license under President Zine El Abidine Ben Ali. After the 2011 revolution, the High Authority independent of audiovisual communication still refuses to grant a license to the second channel.
