= Slim Mahfoudh =

Tunisian actor (1942–2017)

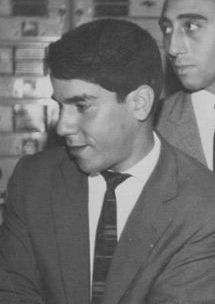
- Born: 19 January 1942
- Died: 30 July 2017 (aged 75)
- Occupation: Actor
- Notable work: L'Étoile du Nord

Slim Mahfoudh (19 January 1942 – 30 July 2017) was a Tunisian actor. He acted on the stage, in feature films like L'Étoile du Nord and on television series like Choufli Hal and Al Khottab Al Bab.

== Filmography ==
=== Cinema ===
- 1980 : C'est pas moi, c'est lui (That's not me, it's him) by Pierre Richard
- 1980 : Le Larron (The thief) by Pasquale Festa Campanile
- 1982 : Deux heures moins le quart avant Jésus-Christ (A quarter to two-hours Bb.C) by Jean Yanne
- 1982 : L'Étoile du Nord (The North Star) by Pierre Granier-Deferre
- 1984 : Par où t'es rentré ? On t'a pas vu sortir (Where did you come? We didn't see you come out) by Philippe Clair
- 2004 : Le Prince (The prince) by Mohamed Zran

=== Television ===
- 1978 : Les Routiers (The truckers) by Georg Feil (German TV serial)
- 1991 : Liyam Kif Errih (Days are like wind) by Slaheddine Essid
- 1994 : Fawazir Fawanis (Fawanis riddles) by Raouf Kouka
- 1996-1997 : El Khottab Al Bab (Suitors are on the door) by Slaheddine Essid, Ali Louati and Moncef Baldi : Slouma Ben Hattab Derbela
- 1997 : Al Motahadi (The challenger) by Moncef Kateb
- 1998 : Îchqa wa Hkayet (Love and stories) by Slaheddine Essid
- 1999 : Ghalia (Precious) by Moncef Kateb
- 2000 : Rih El Misk (The smell of musk) by Slaheddine Essid and Ezzeddine Harbaoui
- 2002 : Gamret Sidi Mahrous (The moon of Master Mahrus) by Slaheddine Essid and Ali Louati
- 2004 : Jari Ya Hamuda (My Dear Neighbour Hamuda) by Abdeljabar Bhouri
- 2005 : Café Jalloul by Lotfi Ben Sassi, Imed Ben Hamida and Mohamed Damak : Heny Buderebela
- 2005-2009 : Choufli Hal (Find me a solution) by Slaheddine Essid : Houcine alias Houssi

=== Theater ===
- Mansur Al-Hallaj
- He Cried Right After Hitting Me
- The Gobelins and Folboni
- The Circus
- Wool Castles
- Between Two Sleeps
- Abou Ezz, the Mutt
- The Marshall
- My Beloved Ones Have Wronged Me
