= The Season of Men =

2000 film

- Film poster
- Directed by: Moufida Tlatli
- Written by: Moufida Tlatli; Nouri Bouzid
- Produced by: Mohamed Tlatli; Margaret Ménégoz; Dora Bouchoucha Fourati
- Starring: Rabia Ben Abdallah
- Cinematography: Youssef Ben Youssef
- Release date: 13 May 2000
- Running time: 122 minutes
- Countries: Tunisia; France
- Languages: Tunisian Arabic; French

The Season of Men (Arabic: موسم الرجال, translit. Maussim al-rijal, French: La saison des hommes) is a 2000 French-Tunisian drama film directed by Moufida Tlatli. It was screened in the Un Certain Regard section at the 2000 Cannes Film Festival. The title of the film, The Season of Men, refers to the one month out of the year that the women's husbands come to the Island of Djerba.

== Cast ==
- Rabia Ben Abdallah as Aicha (as Rabiaa Ben Abdallah)
- Sabah Bouzouita as Zeineb
- Ghalia Benali as Meriem (as Ghalla Ben Ali)
- Hend Sabri as Emna
- Ezzedine Gannoun as Said (as Ezzedine Guennoun)
- Mouna Noureddine as Matriarch
- Azza Baaziz as Meriem as a child
- Lilia Falkat as Emna as a child
- Adel Hergal as Aziz
- Houyem Rassaa as Zohra
- Kaouther Bel Haj Ali as Fatma
- Néjib Belkadhi as Sami
- Jamal Madani as Younes
- Sadok Boutouria as Am Ali
- Zakia Ben Ayed as Regaya
- Wajiha Jendoubi as Salwa

== Plot ==
An 18-year-old on the island Djerba, Aïcha, is married to Said, who works in Tunis for much of the year. Before she can join him in Tunis, Said asks that she give him a son. On the island Djerba, Aïcha lives under the rule of her mother-in-law, with a few other wives, while their husbands work elsewhere. Aïcha eventually gives birth to a son and is allowed to move to Tunis with her husband. However, her son Aziz has developmental problems and is likely autistic, which causes Saïd to reject him. Aïcha returns to Djerba, this time with her son Aziz and her two adult daughters. The film uses extended flashbacks between Aïcha and her young daughters living in Djerba prior to the birth of Aziz and then scenes in the present, where Aziz is about eight, just before she moves back to Djerba. The film ends with Aïcha and Aziz working together on the loom, making tapestries that Aïcha sells. The film ends with Aïcha's younger daughter Emna leaving, which Aïcha and Aziz live together in Djerba.

== Major characters ==
- Aïcha: the main character. She is married to Saïd and has a strong will and mind of her own. Though she struggles, she wants the best life for her children.
- Saïd: Aïcha's husband. He works in Tunis and makes Aïcha live in Djerba until she gives him a son.
- Meriem: Aïcha's oldest daughter. When she was a child, a man attempted to rape her on her way home from school. She struggles with nightmares and fear of men, though she has chosen to live a traditional life, with a gentle husband—unlike her sister Emna.
- Emna: Aïcha's younger daughter. She is very much a rebel and by the end of the movie, chooses to leave Djerba, after realizing that the older, married man she is sleeping with isn't going to give her the life she wants.
- Aziz: Aïcha's son, who is likely suffering from some form of autism and has difficulty communicating.
