= Hannibal TV =

Tunisian television network

- Country: Tunisia
- Headquarters: La Soukra, Tunisia

Programming
- Language: Arabic
- Picture format: 576i (4:3 SDTV)

History
- Launched: February 13, 2005 (original); October 2, 2020 (first relaunch); December 28, 2021 (second relaunch)
- Closed: July 3, 2019 (14 years, 140 days) (original); October 29, 2021 (1 year, 26 days) (first relaunch)

Links
- Website: www.hannibaltv.com.tn

Hannibal TV (Tunisian Arabic: قناة حنبعل) is a Tunisian television network. It has been broadcasting since 2005. The channel ceased operations on July 3, 2019. The channel resumed operations on October 2, 2020, but it was ceased operations again on October 29, 2020. The channel has been resume operations again from December 28, 2021.

== History ==
On February 13, 2004, Tunimedia SARL was granted a 10-year renewable broadcasting license against a royalty of two million dinars per year. The group of the Tunisian millionaire Larbi Nasra launched Hannibal TV on February 12, 2005, at 7:00 pm (Tunisian time) but its official launch took place only on 13 February (date of the first anniversary of the granting of the broadcasting license to chain). The programs began with an hour late on the schedule announced by a reading of the Koran followed by a reading of a letter of the presidency of the republic and a multicast gala throughout the evening.

The channel takes its name from a reference to the Carthaginian general Hannibal and was the first private television channel in Tunisia until the creation of Nessma in 2007.

A partnership agreement with France Télévisions was signed on 23 February 2007. Under the terms of the contract, Hannibal TV would cooperate with the French group in the field of advertising and program production and secondly of a communications consultancy that would focus on attracting foreign advertisers.

In 2008, the Hannibal TV group launched two new channels: Hannibal Orient for the Middle East market and Hannibal Elferdaws devoted to religious programs. As a result of financial problems, these two channels ceased broadcasting two years later.

In November 2013, Larbi Nasra sold almost 90% of the capital of the chain. Tarek Kadada, a Saudi Arabian-born Palestinian, held 49 percent of the capital and became the main shareholder of the channel. The rest of the capital is held by Tunisian investors: Noureddine Hachicha, Mongi Makni, Habib Makni and Imed Ghaïth.

In June 2019, The team of the channel learned that the Nessma channel was closing its doors under the order of Haica, so they sacrificed themselves, Haica decided not to close Nessma so it was Hannibal TV that decided to close it. The channel ceased operations on July 3, 2019.

The channel resumed operations on October 2, 2020. The channel ceased operations again on October 29, 2021.

The channel resumed operations temporarily from December 28, 2021 until the regularization of its situation within a period not exceeding June 30, 2022 due to the agreement between the channel and HAICA.
