= Nadia Fares Anliker =

Swiss Egyptian film director

Nadia Fares
- Born: September 18, 1962 (age 63); Bern, Switzerland
- Education: Cairo University; New York University
- Occupations: Film director, screenwriter
- Years active: 1986-present

Nadia Fares is an Egyptian-Swiss film director and screenwriter.

== Biography ==
Fares was born in Bern, Switzerland, the daughter of an Egyptian father and Swiss mother. She learned Arabic while studying in Cairo for a year, and graduated from Cairo University in 1986. The same year, Fares directed her first short film, Magic Binoculars, the first of several produced for Swiss television. Fares began attending New York University in 1987 to study film. In 1991, she won a prize from the Stanley Thomas Johnson Foundation for her short film Sugarblues. While at New York University, Fares was mentored by Krzysztof Kieślowski and served as the assistant director for several of his works. She took her master's degree in film studies in 1995.

In 1996, Fares directed her first feature-length film, Miel et Cendres. It follows the intersection of three women: doctor Naima, graduate Amina, and student Leila. Miel et Cendres traces their journeys as they navigate between tradition and modernity. It received 18 awards at several film festivals, including the Oumarou Ganda Prize at the Panafrican Film and Television Festival of Ouagadougou. Fares directed several brief documentary films on the topic of social-political issues for RTS/TV5 Monde.

== Filmography ==
Year	Name	Notes
1986	Magic Binoculars	Short film
1986	Letters from New York	Short film
1987	Projections on Sundays	Short film
1987	Semi-Sweet	Short film
1988	Charlotte's Empire	Short film
1988	1001 American Nights	Short film
1990	Short film	
1992	D'amour et d'eau fraîche	Short film
1993	Made in Love	Short film
1995	Portrait d'une femme séropositive	Short film
1995	Lorsque mon heure viendra	Short film
1996	Miel et Cendres	
2003	Anomalies passagères	TV film
2011	Expectations	
