= Mohamed Agrebi =

Tunisian politician

Mohamed Agrebi (born 1961) is a Tunisian politician. He is the former Minister of Employment and Vocational Training.

== Biography ==
Agrebi was born in Nabeul, Tunisia. He received a PhD from the University of Tunis. He worked as a university professor until he was appointed as Minister of Employment and Vocational Training in 2010.

== Personal life ==
Mohamed Agrebi is married and the father of three children.
