= Moncef Dhouib =

Tunisian actor

- Born: 1952 (age 73–74); Sfax
- Occupation: director . actor . screenwriter . producer . puppeteer.
- Notable work: Talfaza Jaya

Moncef Dhouib (Arabic: المنصف ذويب) (born 1952 in Sfax) is a Tunisian film director, actor, screenwriter and producer and puppeteer. He is a recipient of the FESPACO award. After making four notable short films in the 1980s he made The Sultan of the City (Soltane El Medina) (1993) and The TV arrives (Talfaza Jaya) (2006).

== Biography ==
He studied at the University of Paris 3.

He organized giant puppet shows.

In 2014, he wrote a book titled Le roi et les trois buffles.

== Selected filmography ==
=== Actor ===
He played the role of the maid in 1983 in the film Misunderstood.

=== Director ===
He directed a series of short films in 1980.

- 1986: Hammam D'hab written by Hedi Abassi.
- 1989: El hadhra.
- 1992: Soltane El Medina (The Sultan of The City) produced by Ahmed Baha.
- 1995: Tourba.
- 1999: Les siestes grenadine (Grenadine naps) directed by Mahmoud Ben Mahmoud.
- 2006: He produced and directed the comedy film Talfza Jaya produced by Manara productions.

=== Theater ===
He also wrote three solo performances that achieved great success in Tunisia:

- 1993: Makki and Zakia and Fi hak Essardouk Enraychou (one man show) performed by Lamine Nahdi (each of them was performed for more than six years).
- 2008: Mme Kenza performed by Wajiha Jendoubi.
- Manseya Fe Al Entekhabet Al Re2aseya (Forgot in the Presidential elections) performed by Naima El Jeni.

== Awards ==
He received the Award of the Best short film at the 7th African Film Festival in Milan, Italy.
