= Nasreddine Shili =

Tunisian actor

- نصر الدين السهيلي
- Born: Tunis, Tunisia
- Occupations: Actor, director
- Notable work: Boutelisse

Nasreddine Shili (Arabic: نصر الدين السهيلي) is a Tunisian actor, director, writer and producer.

== Filmography ==
=== Director ===
==== Cinema ====
===== Feature films =====
- 2012 : Amère patience (Suçon)
- 2018 : Subutex

===== Short films =====
- 2008 : Boutelisse
- 2010 : Chak-Wak

==== Television ====
- 2015 : Le Risque
- 2022 : Hab El Mlouk
- 2022: The Wooden Boat

=== Actor ===
==== Cinema ====
- 2004 : Le Prince by Mohamed Zran
- 2011 : Love and fresh water (Short films) by Ines Ben Othman

==== Television ====
- 2003 : Ikhwa wa Zaman by Hamadi Arafa
- 2005 : Café Jalloul by Lotfi Ben Sassi, Imed Ben Hamida and Mohamed Damak : Yahia
- 2006 : Hayet Wa Amani by Mohamed Ghodhbane
- 2008–2014 : Maktoub by Sami Fehri and Mehrez Ben Nfisa
- 2012 : Onkoud El Ghadhab by Naïm Ben Rhouma
- 2014 : Naouret El Hawa (season 1) by Madih Belaïd
- 2015 : Le Risque by Nasreddine Shili
- 2019 : Wlad Hlal by Nasreddine Shili
- 2023 : Djebel Lahmar by Rabii Tekali: Lamine Fetoui alias Lima

==== Theater ====
- 2002 : Le Fil, texte by Gao Xingjian and director by Mohamed Driss

== Producer ==
- 2013 : Un Retour by Abdallah Yahya (documentary)
- 2013 : Heureux le martyr by Habib Mestiri ( documentary on Chokri Belaïd)
- 2015 : Tounes by Ahmed Amine Ben Saad (theater play)
