= Férid Boughedir =

Tunisian film director

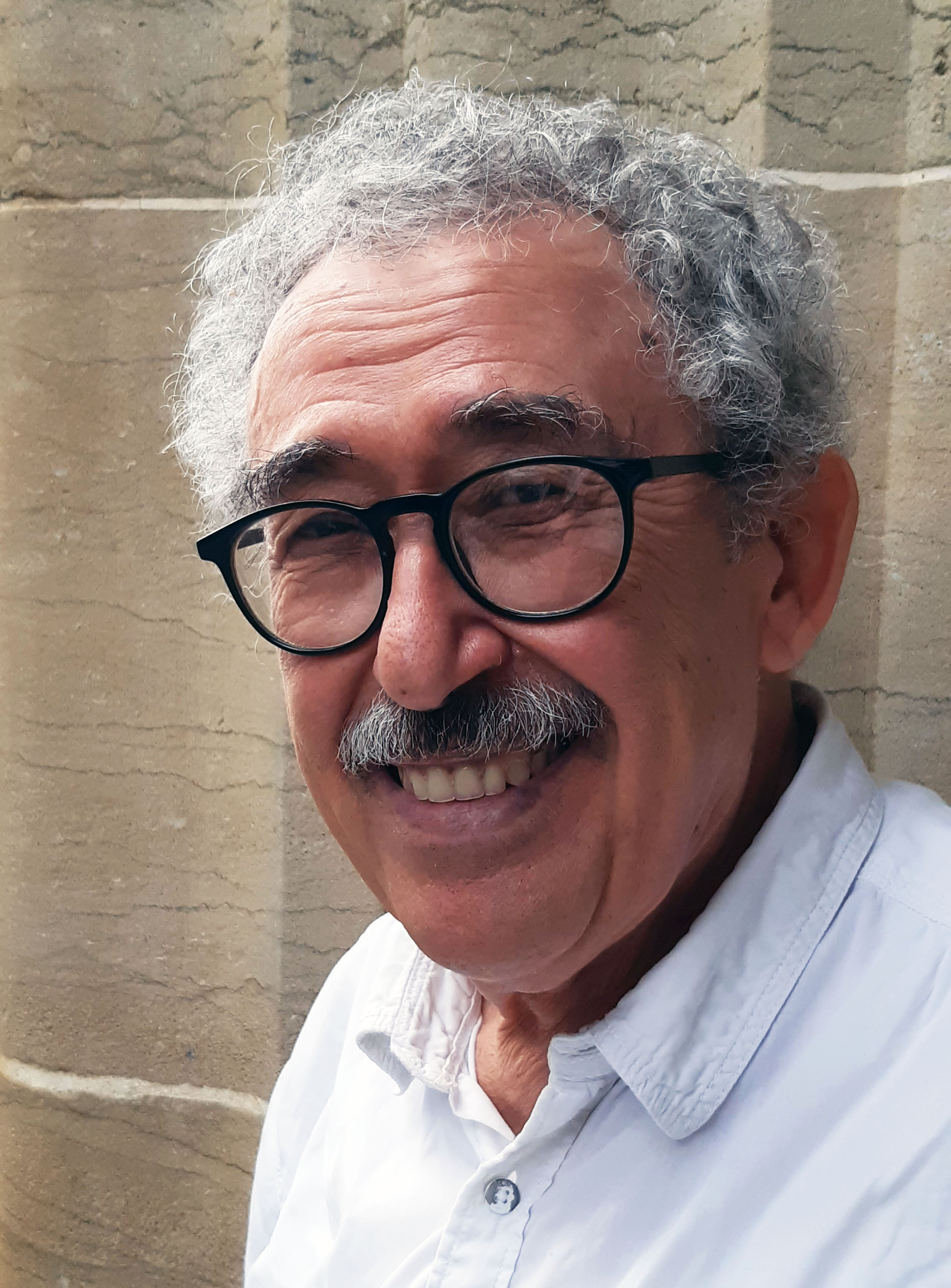
- Férid Boughedir in 2024
- Born: 1944 (age 81–82); Hammam Lif, French Tunisia
- Occupations: Film director; Screenwriter
- Years active: 1983–present

Férid Boughedir (born 1944) is a Tunisian film director and screenwriter.

== Career ==
Boughedir has directed five films since 1983. His film Caméra d'Afrique was screened at the 1983 Cannes Film Festival. In 1996, his film Un été à La Goulette was entered into the 46th Berlin International Film Festival. The following year, he was a member of the jury at the 47th Berlin International Film Festival.

== Filmography ==
- Caméra d'Afrique (1983)
- Caméra arabe (1987)
- Halfaouine Child of the Terraces (1990)
- Un été à La Goulette (1996)
- Villa Jasmin (2008)
