= Mosaïque FM =

Tunisia
- Frequencies: Grand Tunis 94.9MHz; North West 105.8MHz; Bizerte 106.2MHz; Nabeul (Cap-bon) 92.9MHz; Northern Suburbs 90.3MHz; Hammamet 88.9MHz.

Programming
- Languages: Arabic, Tunisian Arabic and French

Ownership
- Owner: Noureddine Boutar; (Private-Commercial)

History
- First air date: 7 November 2003

Links
- Webcast: www.mosaiquefm.net/popup/LivePlayer.php
- Website: www.mosaiquefm.net

Mosaïque FM (Arabic: موزاييك أف أم, romanized: mūzāyik af am; Mosaïque from French, meaning Mosaic in English) is the first private radio station in Tunisia. Its broadcast all of the Tunisian territory. It has also a live stream through its website.

Launched on 7 November 2003, its staff currently consists of 75 employee working at its Montplaisir located headquarters in Tunis.

The radio station gained rapid success and recognition thanks to its flexible and diverse programs that deal with social issues.

In 2007, the age of listeners ranged between 20 and 39.

It has been long speculated that Mosaïque FM was considered to be the radio of "The Trablesi Clan" because Belhassen Trabelsi held 13% of its shares.
