= Majdi Smiri =

Tunisian actor

- Born: Majdi Smiri; 1983 (age 42–43); Tunis, Tunisia
- Education: School of Arts and Cinema
- Occupations: Director, actor, producer, rapper
- Years active: 2010–present

Majdi Smiri (born 1983), often under the pseudonym Maguy, is a Tunisian filmmaker. Started his career as a rapper, Smiri soon became a popular director with popular television serials Talaa Wala Habet, Lilet Chak and Case 460.

== Personal life ==
He was born in 1983 in Tunis, Tunisia.

== Career ==
He began his career as a rapper under the pseudonym Maguy. He wrote, composed and later performed the credits of Njoum Ellil in a duet with the singer Ines Chkimi. In 2006, he made his first cinema appearance with the film Making of directed by Nouri Bouzid. He later obtained a diploma from the School of Arts and Cinema in Tunis. Then he moved to France and worked for a production company for a year. After his return to Tunisia, he created his own audiovisual production company, 'Underground Skills', in 2007. Through the company, he directed several music videos and advertising commercials. Then he directed television programs such as Koujinitna on national television, Urban Fen on Hannibal TV and Ser El Benna on Coujina TV.

In 2009, he played the role 'Farid', a mechanic and rapper, in the soap opera Njoum Ellil directed by Madih Belaïd. In 2012, he made his maiden feature film, Fausse Note in which he was also the writer and producer. In 2015, Smiri received the prize for Best Direction for the soap opera Lilet Chak at the Romdhane Awards, which was awarded by Mosaïque FM. In 2015, he wrote the lyrics for the credits of Lilet Chak, composed by Yacine Azaiez and sung by Chkimi. In 2016, he directed the television series Bolice which won the prize for Best Series at the Romdhane Awards.

== Filmography ==
Year	Film/TV Series	Role	Genre	Ref.
2006	Making Of	Actor	Film	
2009	Njoum Ellil	Actor: Farid	TV series	
2012	Fausse Note	Director	TV series	
2013	Happy Ness	Director, writer, producer	Film	
2015	The Night of Doubt	Director, writer, actor	TV mini-series	
2015	Bolice	Director, writer	TV series	
2017	Compulsory Choice	Director	TV series	
2019	Case 460	Director, writer	TV mini-series	
2020	The Sculptor	Director	TV series	
2020	Cypher	Director, writer	TV series	
2020	Extreme Force Operations	Writer	TV movie	
