= Abdelkader Jerbi =

Tunisian film director (died 2021)

- Died: 3 February 2021
- Occupation: Film director

Abdelkader Jerbi (Arabic: عبد القادر الجربي; died 3 February 2021) was a Tunisian film director.

Jerbi died from COVID-19 in 2021.

== Filmography ==
=== Television movies ===
- 2008: Choufli Hal (Find me a solution), text by Hatem Belhaj

=== Television series ===
- 1986: Raoudha, your daughter, text by Habib Hrar
- 1986: Khatini, (I don't care) text by Chedli Ben Younes, Monji El Ouni and Noureddine Ben Ayed
- 1990: Hokm El Ayem (The destiny of days), text by Slaheddine Chelbi
- 1992: El Douar (ar), text by Abdelkader Jerbi and Hussein Mahnouch
- 1993: El Assifa (The storm), text by Ahmed Ameur Tounsi and Abdelkader Jerbi
- 1995: El Hassad (Desire) with Moncef Baldi and Abdelhakim Alimi
- 1998–2001: Souloukiyet (Behavior) with Boubaker El Euch and text by Belgacem Thabet
- 2000: Ya Zahra Fi Khayali (Oh! Flower in my imagination!), text by Mustapha Adouani, Adem Fathi and Ridha Gaham
- 2001: Malla Ena (Quel Moi!) with Hichem Akermi and text by Sihem Benzarti
- 2003: Douroub Elmouejha (Ways of confrontation), text by Abdelkader Belhaj Nasser
- 2005: Mal Wa Amal (Money and Hopes), text by Abdelhakim Alimi
- 2006: Nwassi w Ateb, text by Allala Nouairia
- 2009: Choufli Hal (season 6) with Hassan Ghodhbane and text by Hatem Belhaj
- 2010: Min Ayam Mliha (From the Days of Maliha), text by Abdelkader Belhaj Nasser
- 2014: Ezzamil (The colleague) with Sadok Hlali and text by Kamel Mouelhi and Lamine Nahdi
- 2016: Dima Ashab (Always friends) with Sadok Hlali and text by Jamel Chamseddine
- Zaama (Perhaps) (Sitcom), text by Noureddine Ben Ayed, Mongi El Ouni and Abdelkader Jerbi

The series Ahna S'hab was not broadcast during Ramadan 2014 as was planned.
