= List of Tunisian films =

An A-Z list of films produced in Tunisia:

== 0–9 ==
- 10 Courts, 10 Regards (2006)

== A ==
- Aicha (1960)
- Les Ambassadeurs (1975)
- Les Anges (1984)
- Anneaux d'or (1959)
- Arab (1988)
- As I Open My Eyes (2015)
- Asfour Stah, a.k.a.Halfaouine: Boy of the Terraces (1990)
- Aux Origines de la Révolution Tunisienne (2011)
- Avril (1998)
- Aziza (1980)

== B ==
- Baath Omah (1965)
- Bab'Aziz (2005)
- Bab el makam (2005)
- Bastardo (2013)
- Bedwin Hacker (2003)
- Bent familia (1997)
- Beyroutou el lika (1981)
- Bezness (1992)
- Biribi (1971)
- La Boîte magique (2002)
- The Bride Market of Imilchil (1988)

== C ==
- Caméra arabe (1987)
- Caméra d'Afrique (1983)
- Camp de Thiaroye (1987)
- Le casseur de pierres (1989)
- Champagne amer (1986)
- Le Chant de la Noria (2002)
- Le Chant du millénaire (2002)
- Citizen Brando (2007)
- Clubbing to Death (2007)
- Le Collier perdu de la colombe (1991)
- Couplouètes (1998)

== D ==
- Dangerous Animal (2005)
- La Danse du vent (2003)
- Deadlines (2004)
- Les Deux Souris blanches (1974)
- Dhil al ardh (1982)
- Dowaha (2009)

== E ==
- Ecrans de Sable (1991)
- En face (2000/II)
- L'enfant Roi (2009)
- Equinoccio, el jardín de las rosas, a.k.a.Equinox, the Garden of the Roses (1991)
- Essaïda (1996)
- Et demain... (1972)
- Et Salammbo? (1970)

== F ==
- Fatma (2002)
- Faut s'les faire!... Ces légionnaires (1981)
- Fellagas (1971)
- La Femme statue, La (1967)
- La Fille de Carthage (1924)
- La Fille de Keltoum (2001)
- Le Fils d'Amr est mort (1975)
- Fleur de pierre (1992)

== G ==
- Gallos de pelea (1969)
- Ghodoua Nahrek (1998)
- Goha (1958)
- Le Grand carnaval (1983)
- Le Guerbag (1985)

== H ==
- El Hadhra (1989)
- Halfaouine: Boy of the Terraces, a.k.a.Asfour Stah (1990)
- Halou u mer (2000)
- Hamida (1965)
- Harb El Khalij... wa baad (1993)
- H'Biba M'Sika (1994)
- Les Hirondelles ne meurent pas à Jerusalem, a.k.a.Swallows Never Die in Jerusalem (1994)

== I ==
- L' Inchiesta (1986)
- Invincibili tre, Gli (1964)

== J ==
- Las Joyas del diablo (1969)

== K ==
- Keïd Ensa (1999)
- Keswa, le fil perdu (1997)
- Kharif 82 (1991)
- Khochkhach (2006)
- Khorma, enfant du cimetière (2002)
- El Kotbia (2002)

== M ==
- Le magique (1996)
- Majnun al Kairouan (1939)
- Making off, le dernier film (2006)
- Man of Ashes, a.k.a.Rih essed (1986)
- Mendiants et orgueilleux (1971)
- Miel et cendres (1996)
- Mokhtar (1968)
- Moolaadé (2004)
- La Mort trouble (1970)
- Al Moutamarred (1968)

== N ==
- Nadia et Sarra (2004)
- Le Nombril du monde (1993)

== O ==
- One Evening in July (2001)

== P ==
- Pirates (1986)
- Po di Sangui (1996)
- Poupées d'argile (2002)
- Poussière de diamant (1992)
- Le Poisson noyé (2008)
- Premier Noël (1999)
- Le Prince (2004)

== R ==
- R.A.S. (1973)
- Railway Men
- Redeyef 54 (1997)
- Rih essed, a.k.a.Man of Ashes (1986)
- Rodriguez au pays des merguez (1980)

== S ==
- Safa'ih min dhahab (1989)
- La Saison des hommes (2000)
- Sama (1988)
- Samt el qusur (1994)
- Sarâb (1982)
- Satin rouge (2002)
- The Secret of Fatouma (1928)
- Seuils interdits (1972)
- Les Siestes Grenadine (1999)
- Signe d'appartenance (2004)
- The Silences of Palace (1994)
- Le Soleil assassiné (2003)
- Soleil des hyènes (1976)
- Sous le signe de Neptune (1962)
- Le Sultan de la Médina (1992)

== T ==
- Tant qu'il y aura de la pelloche (1998)
- Traversées (1984)
- Toefl Al-Shams (2014)

== U ==
- Un été à La Goulette (1996)
- Un homme qui dort (1974)
- Un Paradis au Belvédère (2006)
- Une si simple histoire (1970)

== V ==
- VHS - Kahloucha (2006)
- Viva la muerte (1971)

== Y ==
- Ya nabil (1993)
- Yusra (1971)
