= Gumucio =

Gumucio is a surname. Notable people with the surname include:

- Alfonso Gumucio Dagron (born 1950), Bolivian writer, filmmaker, journalist, photographer and development communication specialist
- Alfonso Gumucio Reyes (1914-1981), Bolivian politician
- Arantza Gumucio (born 1989), Chilean competitive sailor
- Begoña Gumucio (born 1992), Chilean competitive sailor
- Cristián Parker Gumucio (born 1953), Chilean sociologist
- Juan Carlos Gumucio (1949–2002), Bolivian-born journalist and writer
- Mariano Baptista Gumucio (1933–2026), Bolivian politician and writer
- Rafael Gumucio (born 1970), Chilean writer and comedian
- Rafael Agustín Gumucio (1909–1996), Chilean lawyer, academic, and politician
