= Carlos Escudé =

Argentine academic and writer (1948–2021)

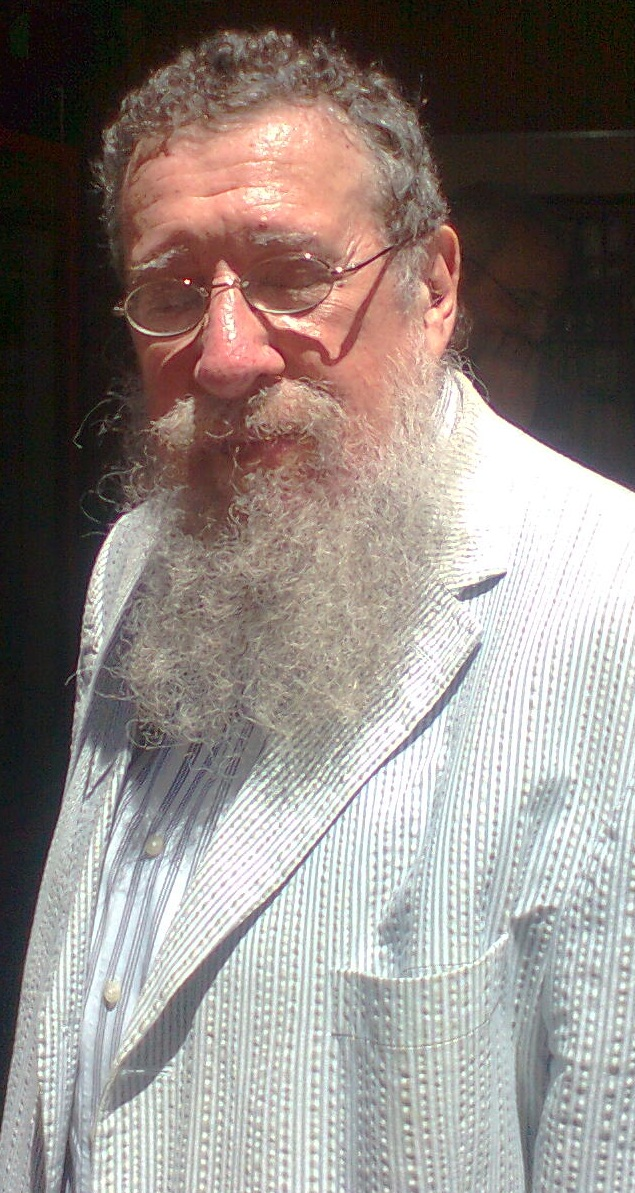
- Carlos Escudé in 2013
- Born: Carlos Andrés Escudé Carvajal; 10 August 1948; Buenos Aires, Argentina
- Died: 1 January 2021 (aged 72); Buenos Aires, Argentina
- Education: Pontifical Catholic University of Argentina
- Occupations: Political scientist and author
- Spouse: Mónica La Madrid (died 2020)

Carlos Andrés Escudé Carvajal (10 August 1948 – 1 January 2021) was an Argentine political scientist and author, who during the 1990s served as special advisor to foreign minister Guido di Tella. As such, he advised on Argentine foreign policy strategy vis-à-vis the Western powers particularly in the wake of the Falklands War.

== Biography ==
Escudé graduated in sociology from the Pontifical Catholic University of Argentina in 1973. In 1977 he matriculated in St. Antony's College, Oxford, transferring to Yale University in 1978 upon receipt of a Fulbright Fellowship. In 1981 he earned his Ph.D. in political science from Yale; in 1984 he was awarded a Guggenheim Fellowship; in 1986 he was decorated with the Order of Bernardo O'Higgins for promoting peace and friendship between Argentina and Chile; in 1996 he received the Konex Award, and in 2003 he was appointed 2003–2004 Ashley Fellow by Trent University (Canada), nominated as "likely the most distinguished political theorist in Latin America". His books have been edited in Argentina, the United States and Italy. His academic articles have also been published in the United Kingdom, Germany, Brazil, Spain, Israel, Poland and Mexico. He has been a visiting professor at Harvard University's Department of Government and at Madrid's Ortega y Gasset Institute, as well as a visiting fellow at St. Antony's College (Oxford), University of Augsburg (Germany), Johns Hopkins University (SAIS), UNC (Chapel Hill) and Texas (Austin).

Escudé's academic work is associated with neomodernism and with peripheral realism. These approaches posit an interstate system with two complementary hierarchies that are only partially overlapping.

He converted to Conservative Judaism.

In 2010, Escudé spoke in favour of the Cristina Fernández administration's foreign policy.

He died from COVID-19 in Buenos Aires, on 1 January 2021, amidst the COVID-19 pandemic in Argentina. His wife, Mónica La Madrid, had also died from the disease on 1 October 2020.

== Publications ==
=== Recent papers ===
- "'Linguistic Peace'? Reflections on the Interstate Security Consequences of Iberian American Linguistic Kinships versus European Linguistic Fragmentation," in Galia Press-Barnathan, Ruth Fine, and Arie M. Kacowicz (editors),The Relevance of Regions in a Globalized World: Bridging the Social Sciences-Humanities Gap, New York: Routledge 2018.
- "The Legitimacy of Interstate Hierarchy", in Kurt Almqvist (ed.), Nation, State and Empire, Stockholm: Axel and Margaret Ax:son Johnson Foundation 2018.
- In coauthorship with Luis L. Schenoni, "Peripheral Realism Revisited," in Revista Brasileira de Política Internacional, Vol. 59:1, April 2016.
- "Who Commands, Who Obeys and Who Rebels: Latin American Security under a Peripheral Realist Perspective", in David Mares and Arie Kacowicz (eds.), Routledge Handbook of Latin American Security, New York 2015.
- "Realism in the Periphery", in Jorge I. Domínguez and Ana Cobarrubias (eds.), Routledge Handbook of Latin America in the World, New York, 2014.
- "Argentina's Grand Strategy in Times of Hegemonic Transition: China, Peripheral Realism and Military Imports", in Revista de relaciones internacionales, estrategia y seguridad (Universidad Militar Nueva Granada, Bogotá), Vol. 10, No. 1.
- "China y Estados Unidos frente a América latina", in Horizontes LatinoAmericanos: Revista de Humanidades e Ciências Sociais do Mercosul Educacional, Vol. I, No. 2 (2014), Fundação Joaquim Nabuco / Editora Massangana.
- "On the Wrong Side of History - Israel, Latin America and the United States under a Peripheral-Realist Perspective, 1949-2012", in Judaica Latinoamericana VII, August 2013. The Hebrew University Magnes Press Ltd.
- "Israeli-Latin American Relations, 1948-2010", in Alfred Wittstock (ed.), The World Facing Israel – Israel Facing the World: Images and Politics, Berlín: Frank & Timme, 2011.
- "National and Territorial Identities in Contemporary Latin America and Europe", in Ryszard Stemplowski (ed.), Europe and Latin America, Looking at Each Other?, Warsaw: Polish Institute of International Affairs, 2010.
- "Réquiem al realismo periférico: ascenso y ocaso de una experiencia argentina de construcción de una teoría de RRII, 1986-1997", in Cristián Parker Gumucio and Fernando Estenssoro Saavedra (eds.), El desafío del conocimiento para América latina, Santiago de Chile: Explora/USACH-IDEA, 2010.
- "Peripheral Realism: An Argentine Theory-Building Experience, 1986-1997", in José Flávio Sombra Saraiva (ed.), Concepts, Histories and Theories of International Relations for the 21st Century: Regional and National Approaches, Brasília: IBRI, 2009.
- "La civilización iberoamericana y sus relaciones internacionales", in R. Stemplowski (ed.), On the State of Latin American States: Approaching the Bicentenary, Kracov, Poland: Andrzeja Frycza Modrzewski Kraków University, 2009.
- "Piqueteros al gobierno: un experimento populista argentino, 2003-2007", Estudios Interdisciplinarios de América Latina y el Caribe (Aranne School of History, University of Tel Aviv), Vol. 20 (1), January–June 2009.
- Review of Ricardo Salvatore's Imágenes de un Imperio: Estados Unidos y las Formas de Representación de América Latina (Buenos Aires: Sudamericana, 2006), in Estudios Interdisciplinarios de América Latina y el Caribe (Aranne School of History, University of Tel Aviv), Vol. 18, Nº 2, Jul-Dec 2007, pp. 125–127.
- "De Estado cautivo a Estado fallido: La Argentina y su populismo sistémico, 1975-2006" http://d.repec.org/n?u=RePEc:hal:papers:halshs-00103870_v1&r=all; EconPapers
- "From Captive to Failed State: Argentina under Systemic Populism, 1975-2006", en The Fletcher Forum of World Affairs, Vol. 30 (2), verano de 2006.
- "An Introduction to Peripheral Pealism", published in Stephanie Neuman (ed.), International Relations Theory and the Third World (New York, St. Martin's Press and Palgrave Macmillan, 1998).
- "Argentinien - Land frustrierter Perspektiven? Ein Erklärungsansatz für relativen Frustrationen der Argentinier", en Klaus Bodemer, Andrea Pagni y Peter Waldmann (comp.), Argentinien Heute, Frankfurt: Vervuert, 2002, pp. 37–58.
- "Argentina, Israel y los Judíos", Revista de Libros, Nº 69, septiembre de 2002, Madrid;
- "Argentina: A 'Parasite State' on the Verge of Disintegration", Cambridge Review of International Affairs, Volumen 15 (3), octubre de 2002; pp. 453–467.
- "Natural Law at War", The Times Literary Supplement (TLS, Londres), 31 de mayo de 2002;
- "Unía Europejska i globalne bezpieczenstwo w ponowoczesnym swiecie", en Polski Przeglad Dyplomatyczny, Vol. 2, Nº 1 (5) 2002; p. 57-85.
- Карлос Эскуде (Carlos Escudé), "Европейский Союз и глобальная безопасность в мировой системе постсовременности (world-system)", en Европа, Volumen 2 (3), 2002, pp. 96–130.
- "When Security Reigns Supreme: The Postmodern World-System vis-à-vis Globalized Terrorism and Organized Crime", en R. Stemplowski (comp.), Transnational Terrorism in the World System Perspective, Varsovia: Polish Institute of International Affairs, 2002, pp. 69–95
- "The European Union and Global Security in the Postmodern World-System", en R. Stemplowski (comp.) The European Union in the World System Perspective; Varsovia: Polish Institute of International Affairs, 2002, pp. 92–120.
- "The Falklands will never be Argentine", in Lyubomir Ivanov et al. The Future of the Falkland Islands and Its People, Sofía: Manfred Wörner Foundation, 2003. pp. 38–40.
- "¿Cuánto valen esas bases? El tira y afloja entre Estados Unidos y España, 1951-1953", en Cuadernos de Historia Contemporánea, Vol. 25 (2003), pp. 61–81 apareció a mediados de 2004.
- In co-authorship with Beatriz Gurevich, "Limits to Governability, Corruption and Transnational Terrorism: The Case of the 1992 and 1994 Attacks in Buenos Aires", en E.I.A.L - Estudios Interdisciplinarios de América Latina y el Caribe, Universidad de Tel Aviv, Vol. 14, Nº 2, julio-diciembre de 2003, pp. 127–148.

=== Books ===
- ¡Y Luis D'Elía tenía razón! Algunas aberraciones de la política argentina, Buenos Aires, Colección Peña Lillo (Ediciones Continente), 2018.
- Argentina, National Identity, Peripheral Realism and Identity Politics: Research Essays on the Interplay Between Political Culture and the International Relations of Argentina, Beau Bassin (Mauritius), Editorial Académica Española 2017.
- Neomodernismo: filosofía de las jerarquías, Buenos Aires: Ed. Lumière, 2016.
- With Macarena Sabio Mioni, Radiografía universal de la infamia: viñetas sobre el estado del mundo en nuestro tiempo, Buenos Aires, Ed. Lumière, 2013.
- Principios de realismo periférico: una teoría argentina y su vigencia ante el ascenso de China, Buenos Aires, Ed. Lumière, 2012.
- Por qué soy judío y otros ensayos, Buenos Aires: Ed. Lumière, 2010.
- La Guerra de los Dioses: los Mandatos Bíblicos frente a la Política Mundial, Buenos Aires: Ed. Lumière, 2007
- Festival de Licuaciones: Causas y Consecuencias de la Pobreza en la Argentina, Buenos Aires: Ed. Lumière, 2006.
- El Estado Parasitario: Argentina, Ciclos de Vaciamiento, Clase Política Delictiva y Colapso de la Política Exterior, Buenos Aires: Ed. Lumière, 2005.
- Historia General de las Relaciones Exteriores de la República Argentina. Fifteen volumes dedicated to the history of Argentina's foreign relations, from the frustrated British invasions of 1806 until the end of the Menem administration in 1999. Directed by Carlos Escudé and Andrés Cisneros, with the collaboration of a team of twelve researchers. Published as books in Buenos Aires: GEL, 1998–2003.
- Estado del Mundo: Las Nuevas Reglas de la Política Internacional Vistas desde el Cono Sur, Buenos Aires: Ariel, 1999.
- Los Mercenarios del Fin del Milenio: Estados Unidos, Europa y la Proliferación de Servicios Militares Privados, Buenos Aires: Belgrano, 1999.
- Foreign Policy Theory in Menem's Argentina, Gainesville, Florida: University Press of Florida, 1997.
- Biografía Apócrifa de Andrés Carvajal, Buenos Aires: GEL/Nuevohacer, 1996 (novel).
- El Realismo de los Estados Débiles: la política exterior del primer gobierno Menem frente a la teoría de las relaciones internacionales, (publicado bajo los auspicios del Center for International Affairs, Harvard University), Buenos Aires: GEL 1995.
- Realismo Periférico: Bases Teóricas para una Nueva Política Exterior Argentina, Buenos Aires: Planeta 1992.
- La "Riconquista" Argentina: Scuola e Nazionalismo, Fiesole, Italy: Edizioni Cultura della Pace, 1992. Abridged version, in Italian, of the 1990 book listed below.
- El Fracaso del Proyecto Argentino: Educación e Ideología, Buenos Aires: Ed. Tesis/Instituto Torcuato Di Tella, 1990.
- Patología del Nacionalismo: el Caso Argentino, Buenos Aires: Ed. Tesis/Instituto Torcuato Di Tella, 1987.
- La Argentina vs. las Grandes Potencias: el Precio del Desafío, Buenos Aires: Ed. de Belgrano 1986.
- La Argentina, ¿Paria Internacional? (con la colaboración de Cristóbal Williams), Buenos Aires: Ed. de Belgrano 1984.
- Gran Bretaña, Estados Unidos y la Declinación Argentina, 1942-49, Buenos Aires: Ed. de Belgrano, ediciones en 1983, 1984, 1988 y 1996.
- With Beatriz Gurevich, editor of El Genocidio Ante la Historia y la Naturaleza Humana, Buenos Aires: GEL, 1994.
