= Nadia et Sarra =

2006 Franco-Tunisian drama film

- Directed by: Moufida Tlatli
- Written by: Hélène Couturier; Moufida Tlatli
- Starring: Hiam Abbass; Dorra Zarrouk; Hichem Rostom; Nejia Ouerghi; Nadia Saiji; Mohamed Ali Ben Jemaa; Nidhal Guiga
- Cinematography: Chedli Chaouachi; Alain Levent
- Edited by: Ariane Boeglin
- Music by: Nicolas Jorelle
- Production companies: ARTE; Cinétévé
- Distributed by: AB International
- Release date: 20 June 2006; (France)
- Running time: 90 minutes
- Countries: Tunisia; France
- Languages: French; Arabic

Nadia et Sarra, is a 2006 Franco-Tunisian drama film directed by Moufida Tlatli and produced by Ephraim Gordon. The film stars Hiam Abbass and Dorra Zarrouk in the lead roles whereas Hichem Rostom, Nejia Ouerghi, Nadia Saiji, Mohamed Ali Ben Jemaa and Nidhal Guiga made supportive roles. The film deals with Nadia, a 47-year-old Tunisian professor entering menopause.

The film was shot in Tunis, Tunisia. The film made its premier on 20 June 2006 in France. The film received mixed reviews from critics.

== Cast ==
- Hiam Abbass as Nadia
- Dorra Zarrouk as Sarra
- Hichem Rostom as Hedi
- Nejia Ouerghi as Om El Khir
- Nadia Saiji as Leila
- Mohamed Ali Ben Jemaa as Majid
- Nidhal Guiga as Dalila
- Serge Meddeb as Tarak
- Samia Ayari as Gynécologue
- Martine Gafsi as Soraya
- M'Hamed Ali Grandi as Directeur
- Haifa Bouzouita as Danseuse
- Elyes Messaed as Professeur de gymnastique
- Leila Ben Hamida as Jeune fille 1
- Ahlem Cheffi as Jeune fille 2
- Mohamed Bechir Snoussi as Jeune lycéem
- Mourad Toumi as Docteur Selmi
- Adel Cherif as Chauffeur de taxi
- Taoufik Ayeb as Homme Avenue
- Leila Rokbani as Vendeuse
- Wassila Dari as Ouvreuse
- Naejib Khalfallah as Serveur du café
- Hafedh Dakhlaoui as Rayan
