= Mustapha Adouani =

Tunisian actor

- مصطفى العدواني
- Born: October 2, 1946
- Died: December 14, 2006 (aged 60); Tunis, Tunisia
- Occupation: Actor
- Notable work: L'Homme de cendres

Mustapha Adouani (Arabic: مصطفى العدواني; October 2, 1946 – December 14, 2006, in Tunis) was a Tunisian actor.

== Filmography ==
=== Cinema ===
- 1982: Plus beau que moi, tu meurs (More handsome than me, you die) by Philippe Clair (Guest of honor)
- 1984: Par où t'es rentré ? On t'a pas vu sortir (From where did you enter? We didn't see you coming out) by Philippe Clair (Guest of honor)
- 1986: L'Homme de cendres (Ashes' Man) by Nouri Bouzid as Ameur
- 1990: Halfaouine, l'enfant des terrasses ( Halafaouine, child of terraces) by Férid Boughedir as Mr Azzouz
- 1992: Bezness (Playboy) by Nouri Bouzid as Kommisar
- 1992: Le Sultan de la médina (Sultan of the Medina) by Moncef Dhouib (Guest of honor)
- 1993: Trip nach Tunis by Peter Goedel (de) as Melik
- 1993: Le Nombril du monde (The navel of the World) by Ariel Zeitoun as Mokhtar
- 1996: Un été à La Goulette (Summer in La Goulette) by Férid Boughedir as Youssef
- 1997: Vivre au paradis (Living in Paradise) by Bourlem Guerdjou as Belkacem
- 1999: Un Rire de trop (Too much Laughing) (short film) by Ibrahim Letaief as Interpreter
- 2000: La Faute à Voltaire Voltaire's Fault) by Abdellatif Kechiche as Mostafa
- 2002: The Library by Nawfel Saheb-Ettaba (Guest of honor)
- 2002: The Magic Box by Ridha Béhi (Guest of honor)
- 2004: Le Prince (The Prince) by Mohamed Zran as Ali
- 2004: Noce d'été (Summer Wedding) by Mokhtar Ladjimi (Guest of honor)

=== Télévision ===
==== Séries télévisées ====
- 1980: L'inspecteur mène l'enquête (The inspector leads the investigation) by Jean-Paul Roux, Marc Pavaux, Luc Godevais, Guy Saguez, Jean-Pierre Barizien, Armand Ridel, Eddy Naka, Karel Prokop and Pierre Cavassilas (Guest of honor)
- 1981: La Nouvelle Malle des Indes (The new Indian Trunk) by Emilio Baldelli and Pierre-Louis Thévenet (Guest of honor)
- 1983: L'Homme de Suez (The Man from Suez) by Christian-Jaque (Guest of honor)
- 1991: Julianus barát (Friend Julian) by Gábor Koltay (Guest of honor)
- 1994: Amwaj (Waves) by Ali Ben Arfa, Ali Mansour, Slaheddine Essid et Aziz Abdelkader as Farid
- 1998: Hokm El Ayam (Rules of days) by Abdelkader Jerbi, Fraj Slama and Slaheddine Chelbi as Taher
- 2000: Ya Zahra Fi Khayali (A Flower in my Imagination) by Abdelkader Jerbi, Mustapha Adouani, Ridha Gaham and Adem Fathi as Salem
- 2002: Chams Wa Dhilel (A Sun and Shadows) by Ezzedine Harbaoui and Jamel Chamseddine (Guest of honor)
- 2003: Douroub El Mouwajha (Paths of confrontation) by Abdelkader Jerbi and Abdelkader Ben Hadj Nasser as Fadhel

==== Telefilms ====
- 1994: Tödliche Dienstreise (Fatal Business Trip) by Driss Chraïbi and Ray Müller
- 1995: Maxime et Wanda: l'homme qui n'en savait pas assez (Maxime et Wanda: The man who didn't know enough) by François Dupont-Midy
- 1998: Il tesoro di Damasco (The Damascus Treasure) by José María Sánchez (it)
- 2002: Talak Incha (Divorce Whim) by Moncef Dhouib: Doctor Hamza
