= Alfonso Gumucio Dagron =

Bolivian writer and filmmaker

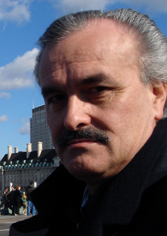
- Alfonso Gumucio in London, in March 2006
- Born: October 31, 1950 (age 75) La Paz, Bolivia
- Occupation: poet, short story writer, photographer, journalist, filmmaker
- Genre: essay, short story, poetry

Alfonso Gumucio Dagron (born October 31, 1950) is a Bolivian writer, filmmaker, journalist, photographer and development communication specialist. His father was Alfonso Gumucio Reyes, a leader of the Movimiento Nacionalista Revolucionario (MNR), Minister of Economy during the Government of Víctor Paz Estenssoro, and Ambassador to Uruguay and Spain. He is the author of several books on film and [communication for social change, as well as documentary films, photographic exhibits and hundreds of articles in journals. He has worked in five continents on social development projects, as a communication for development specialist.

Because of his involvement as progressive journalist he has twice been forced to live in exile, first living in Paris from 1972 to 1978, and later in Mexico from 1980 to 1984.

He studied filmmaking at the Institut des hautes études cinématographique (IDHEC) and the University of Vincennes, in Paris. Back in Bolivia in 1978 he directed a number of documentaries on cultural and social issues, as he worked at the Centro de Investigacion y Promocion del Campesinado (CIPCA), a Bolivian NGO, and published as a journalist in various daily newspapers and weekly journals.

Since the mid-1980s his work in development communication programs has taken him to Africa, Asia, the South Pacific, Latin America and The Caribbean, serving for various international organizations. He worked with UNICEF in Nigeria and Haiti, and as an international consultant for FAO, UNDP, UNESCO, The Rockefeller Foundation, AusAID and Conservation International. He is the Managing Director for Programmes at the Communication for Social Change Consortium and familiar with issues of child rights, environment, indigenous populations, arts and culture, human rights, community organization, health and sustainable development.

== Books ==
Gumucio Dagron has published over twenty books, including poetry, narrative and studies on literature, film and communication: Provocaciones, his first book (1977) is a collection of in-depth interviews with 14 important Bolivian writers, among them: Jesus Lara, Augusto Cespedes, Oscar Cerruto, Jaime Saenz, Pedro Shimose, Renato Prada Oropeza and Raul Teixido. His studies on Bolivian and Latin American cinema trace the evolution of this art form in his region and home country: Historia del Cine Boliviano (Mexico, 1982); Cine, Censura y Exilio en América Latina (1979); Les Cinémas d’Amerique Latine (Paris, 1981) written in French, in collaboration with French film critic Guy Hennebelle; El Cine de los Trabajadores (Managua, 1981), and Luis Espinal y el Cine (1986).

Issues of communication, participation and development are at the core of other of his books: Las Radios Mineras de Bolivia (1989) written in collaboration with Bolivian journalist Lupe Cajías; Comunicación Alternativa y Cambio Social (1990); Conservacion, Desarrollo y Comunicacion (1990); NGO Puzzle (Nigeria, 1993) in collaboration with G.K. Ngeri Nwagha; Popular Theatre (Nigeria, 1994); Making Waves: Participatory communication for social change (New York, 2001), a research project for The Rockefeller Foundation, published in Spanish, English and French; and Communication for Social Change Anthology: Historical and Contemporary Readings (New York, 2006), edited in collaboration with Thomas Tufte, launched at the World Congress of Communication for Development (WCCD) in Rome, October 2006.

Bolivie (Paris, 1981, published by Editions Le Seuil), is an essay on his home country, covering history, politics, culture and other issues. La Máscara del Gorila (Mexico, 1982), is his account on the Bolivian military coup of 1980 and was awarded with the National Literature Award of the Instituto Nacional de Bellas Artes of Mexico (INBA).

His poetry books include: Antología del asco (1979), Razones técnicas (1980), Sobras completas (1984), Sentímetros (1990) and Memoria de Caracoles (2000).

His short stories, poems and essays have been selected in about 30 anthologies and collections, among them those edited by John Downing, Julianne Burton, Manuel Vargas, Raquel Montenegro, Cecilia Pisos, Víctor Montoya, Rosario Santos, Jan Servaes, Bruce Girard, Paulo Antonio Paranagua, Ángel Flores, Tim Barnard, Sandra Reyes, and Alan O'Connor.

== Films ==
Gumucio Dagron studied film in France and worked as assistant director to Alan Labrousse and Jorge Sanjines, and as a scriptwriter for Antonio Eguino. Dagron's first film as director, Señores Generales, Señores Coroneles (1976), is a documentary portraying the role of the Bolivian army and the CIA in the 1971 military coup that interrupted the democratic process in Bolivia; it includes interviews with Philip Agee, former CIA agent, and Régis Debray. During the late 1970s and early 1980s Dagron directed short documentary films on social and cultural issues, including Tupaj Katari, 15 de noviembre (1978), El Ejército en Villa Anta (1979), Comunidades de Trabajo (1979), Cooperativa Sandino (Nicaragua, 1980), Domitila: la mujer y la organización (1980), Primo Castrillo, poeta (1984). In 1983 he co-directed with Eduardo Barrios, a documentary for UNESCO on the miners community radio stations: The voice of the mines. Dagron's documentary film Bolivia: Union Rights (1988), part of the People Matter series produced by AVISE, was aired by the Dutch television. He later directed Oloruntoba (Nigeria, 1994), a portrait of the Nigerian artist; Sous Lavi (Haiti, 1997); La Primerisima (2003) and Voices from the Magdalena: Communication for Peace (Colombia, 2006), a report on community radio stations working in a war-torn region of Colombia.

Dagron has been active as a film critic during the 1980s and 1990s, publishing his columns in journals of Latin America, Europe, North America and Africa.

== Photography ==
Over the years, his photographic work has been shown in personal and collective exhibits on Bolivian landscapes and people (Altiplano, 1989) and portraits of artists from Latin America (Retrato Hablado, 1990). After four years working in Nigeria, he presented his series on children (Age of Innocence, Nigeria 1994 and (Bagaje Africano, Bolivia 1995). In Haiti he exhibited people and landscapes (Trois-sur-Haiti, 1997). Other photography shows include: Imágenes de Bolivia (París, 1973), Reflejos y Transparencias (La Paz, 1988), Nueve Fotógrafos (La Paz, 1990), Paisaje y Medio Ambiente (La Paz, 1995). Some of his photographs have been distributed by Gamma agency, and through the German news agency DPA, along with his articles on Latin American culture.

Books such as Realizando el Futuro published by the Corporación Andina de Fomento (CAF), Ciudad de La Paz, Luz, Magia y Tradición published by the Municipality of La Paz, included his photographs, as well as Imágenes del Trabajo, awarded at the 4th International Art Contest organized by the International Labour Organization (ILO) in 1986. His photographic work has been used in book covers, calendars, magazines and journals of Latin America.

In 1983 he wrote the first historical perspective on Bolivian photography, which was published in the monthly journal Bolivia 2000 with the title "Primera Aproximación a la Fotografía en Bolivia". Later, in 1986 Cóndor, a quarterly review published in Switzerland, printed his article "Breve Vistazo a la Fotografía Boliviana". He is a founding member of the Bolivian Society of Photography (Sociedad Boliviana de Fotografía) and served as Secretary for Media Relations for the 1986–88 period. He was elected President of the Bolivian Circle of Professional Photographers (Círculo de Boliviano de Fotografía) for 1995–96.

== Journalism ==
Alfonso Gumucio Dagron has published over a thousand articles and short essays in approximately one hundred newspapers, journals and magazines of Latin America, Europe, North America, Asia and Africa.

He has been editor, board member, chief editor, cultural editor or correspondent of Vinculo, Revista Nacional de Cultura, El Nacional, Facetas, El Mundo, Zeta, Aquí, and Vanguardia in Bolivia, as well as Excelsior (Mexico), Desquicio (France), Brecha (Uruguay), and The Journal of Development Communication (Malaysia).
