= Tlatli =

Tlatli is a surname. Notable people with the surname include:

- Adel Tlatli (born 1958), Tunisian basketball coach
- Moufida Tlatli (1947–2021), Tunisian film director, screenwriter, and editor
