= Abdou Achouba =

Moroccan-Italian filmmaker

- Born: 1 January 1950 (age 76); Rabat
- Citizenship: Morocco
- Occupation: Filmmaker

Abdou Achouba (born 1950 in Rabat) is a Moroccan-Italian filmmaker, journalist, film critic and producer. He has presided over the jury of short films at the Moroccan National Film Festival. He studied political science, then cinema at the IDHEC in Paris.

== Filmography ==
=== Feature films ===
- Kane Ya Kane (1977, documentary)
- Taghounja (1980)
- Saadati Aissawa (1982, documentary)

=== Short films ===
- Flip Paradise (1979)
