= Souhir Ben Amara =

Tunisian actress

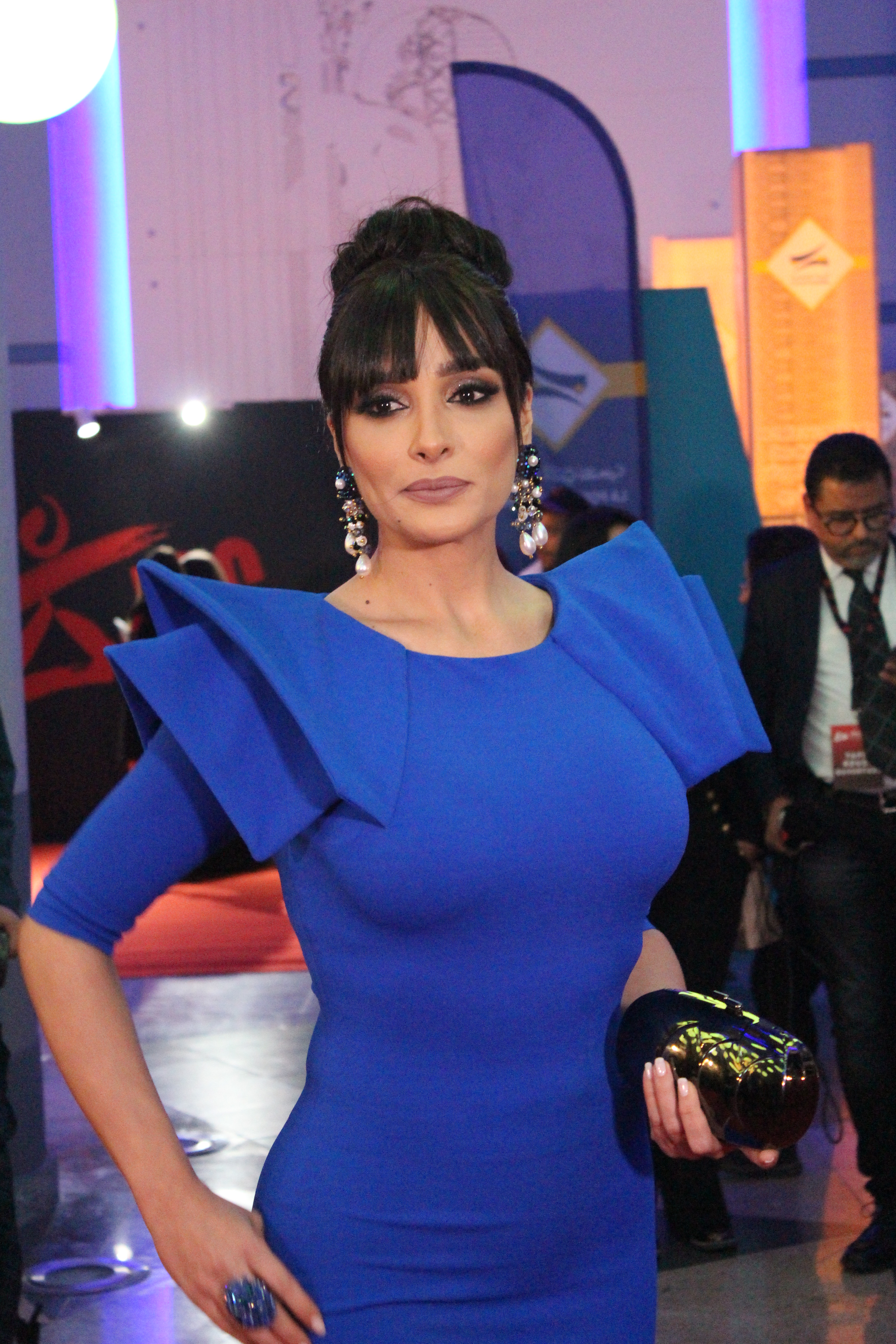
- Souhir Ben Amara in 2018
- Born: November 27, 1985 (age 40); Tunis, Tunisia
- Occupation: Actress
- Years active: 2008–present

Souhir Ben Amara (Arabic: سهير بن عمارة; born 27 November 1985) is a Tunisian actress.

== Biography ==
The daughter of a diplomat, she lived in Paris until the age of six before moving to Tunisia. Passionate about art from her youth, it was at the age of sixteen that she decided to really make it her profession. Ben Amara's father was sick during high school, but she obtained her baccalaureate with honors. She took a gap year, then studied at the Higher Institute of Multimedia Arts in La Manouba, where she received an audiovisual diploma. Though she is a director by training, Ben Amara has focused on acting since her senior project.

Her career began on television with the Maktoub and Choufli Hal series in 2008. She starred as Maliha in Min Ayam Mliha in 2010. Ben Amara made her film debut in Always Brando (2011), directed by Ridha Béhi. She played the symbolic role of Zena and was cast last minute when the director did not like the actress chosen for the role. In 2012, Ben Amara played Aicha in Millefeuille, directed by Nouri Bouzid, dealing with issues with the hijab.

In 2013, she played the role of Donia in the miniseries Yawmiyat Imraa. In 2019, Ben Amara starred in the historical soap opera Kingdoms of Fire. She had a principal role in Sortilège (2019), directed by Ala Eddine Slim. She was attracted by its script, and her character meets the soldier after moving from a forest. The film premiered at the Cannes Film Festival, and she called the film the cinema of perception.

Ben Amara supported the Arab Spring and participated in the events, but feels bitter that politicians stole the popular will. She has said that her ideal role would be that of a tomboy character.

== Filmography ==
Films

- 2011 : Always Brando : Zena
- 2012 : Millefeuille : Aïcha
- 2014 : Tafkik
- 2017 : El Jaida
- 2018 : The Crow's Siesta
- 2019 : Tlamess

Television

- 2008 : Maktoub : Lili
- 2008 : Choufli Hal
- 2009 : Achek Assarab : Fatma
- 2010 : Min Ayam Mliha : Maliha
- 2012 : Dipanini
- 2013 : Yawmiyat Imraa : Donia Ben Amor
- 2014 : Dragunov
- 2015 : Anna e Yusuf
- 2015 : Lilet Chak : Linda
- 2015 : Histoires tunisiennes : Sandra
- 2016 : Le Président
- 2016-2017 : Flashback
- 2016 : Bolice 2.0
- 2017 : La Coiffeuse
- 2019 : Kingdoms of Fire : Hafsa Sultan
