= Mohamed Mrad =

Tunisian actor and model

- محمد مراد
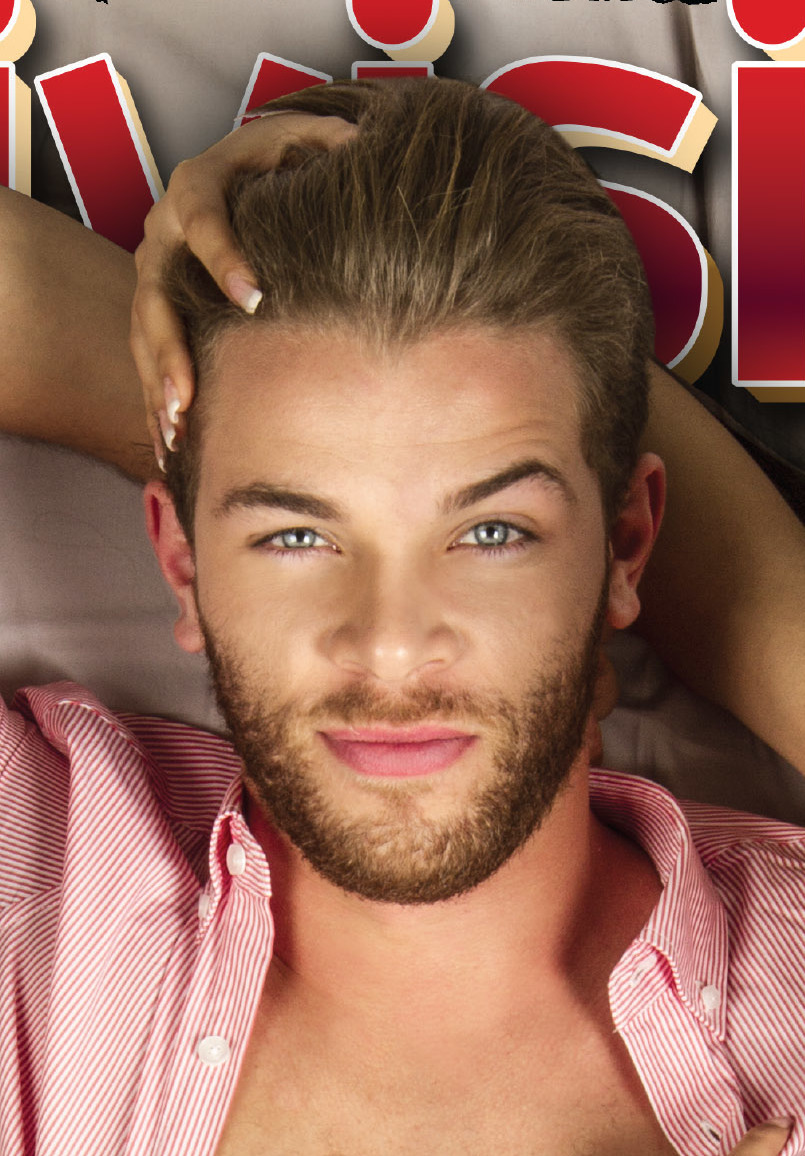
- Mohamed Mrad December 2014
- Born: September 15, 1990 (age 35); Tunis, Tunisia
- Education: Carthage High Commercial Studies Institute
- Occupations: actor, model
- Known for: Naouret El Hawa
- Notable work: Toefl Al-Shams
- Website: https://mohamedmrad.com/

Mohamed Mrad (Arabic: محمد مراد, born on September 15, 1990, in Tunis) is a Tunisian actor and model, best known for his role of Mahdi Ben Salem in the Television series Naouret El Hawa.

== Early life and education ==
Born on September 15, 1990 in Tunis, he studied at the Carthage High Commercial Studies Institute in Tunis.

== Career ==
2013 was his first experience in the television soap opera "Layem" the popular soap opera of Ramadan 2013 in which he played the role of Skander, a wealthy young man with a bad boy character.

In December 2014 he made the cover of the people magazine Tunivisions. Mrad is also known for his role in "L'Enfant du soleil" by Taïeb Louhichi and "Fausse note" by Majdi Smiri.

He is best known for his role of Mahdi Ben Salem in the Television series Naouret El Hawa.

In 2015, Mohamed Mourad participated in Arab Casting.

In 2019 Mohamed Mrad played the role of a police officer in charge of investigating a case that will plunge into a love relationship and into the world of politics in the television series "L'affaire 460" by Majdi Smiri, which was filmed in Russia.

== Filmography ==
=== Cinema ===
- 2012: False Note by Majdi Smiri
- 2014: Toefl Al-Shams (The Sun's Kid) by Taieb Louhichi : Fafou
- 2015: Dicta Shot by Mokhtar Ladjimi
- 2016: Woh ! by Ismahane Lahmar : Selim

=== Television ===
- 2013: Layem by Khaled Barsaoui : Skander
- 2014: Talaa Wala Habet by Majdi Smiri : Youri
- 2014–2015: Naouret El Hawa by Madih Belaid : Mahdi Ben Salem
- 2015: Bolice 2.0 by Majdi Smiri : Mohannad (invité d'honneur)
- 2015 & 2017: Sultan Achour 10 by Djaâfar Gacem : Djawed
- 2016: Al Akaber by Madih Belaid : Mohamed Al Othmani
- 2016–2017: Flashback by Mourad Ben Cheikh : Walid
- 2018: Tej El Hadhra by Sami Fehri : Kacem
- 2019: The Affair 460 by Majdi Smiri : Youssef Ismail
- 2019 + 2021: Machair (Feelings) by Muhammet Gök : Mourad
- 2023–2024 : Fallujah by Saoussen Jemni : Kader
- 2025: " El Fetna " by Sawsan El Gamni : Taha
- 2026: El Khottifa (The Swallow Bird, Arabic: الخطّيفة), by Saoussen Jemni : Farouk Belkhir / Youssef

=== TV shows ===
- 2015 :
  - Dbara Tounsia avec Hana Fehri on El Hiwar El Tounsi
  - Romdhane Showtime on Mosaique FM with Aicha Attia, Ali Bennour, Najla Ben Abdallah et Hédi Zaiem
- 2016 : Arab Casting (ar) on Abu Dhabi TV : candidate
- 2018 : Hkayet Tounsia (Tunisian Stories) on El Hiwar El Tounsi : Guest of Episode 3 of Season 3
- 2019 : Abdelli Showtime of Lotfi Abdelli on Attessia TV : Guest of Episode 4 of season 3
- 2020 : Labès (We're Fine) (season 9) of Naoufel Ouertani on Attessia TV
- 2021 : Dari Darek (our Home is yours) of Amel Smaoui on YouTube Channel of Radio IFM : Guest of Episode 58 of the web-show

=== Videos ===
- 2014: Commercial Ma Äadech Bekri (It is late) for the subscriptions in the electoral lists, realised by Tunistudio
- 2015: Commercial for the association Tuniespoir, realised by Madih Belaid
- 2017: Music video Yama Lasmar Douni by Asma Othmani
