= Layla, My Reason =

1989 film

- Directed by: Taieb Louhichi
- Written by: Taieb Louhichi; André Miquel
- Starring: Tarik Akan; Safy Boutella; Anca Nicola
- Cinematography: Hugues Ryffel
- Edited by: Laurent Uhler
- Music by: Egisto Macchi
- Release date: 1989
- Language: Arabic

Layla, My Reason (French: Layla, ma raison, Arabic: مجنون ليلى, romanized: Majnoun Layla) is a 1989 romantic drama film co-written and directed by Taieb Louhichi. A co-production between Tunisia, Algeria and France, it is based on the novel Layla, ma raison by André Miquel, which was itself an adaptation of the traditional Arab legend Layla and Majnun. It was entered into the main competition at the 46th edition of the Venice Film Festival.

== Cast ==
- Tarik Akan as Mecnun
- Safy Boutella as Qays-Majnûn
- Anca Nicola as Layla
- Mouna Noureddine as Layla's mother
- Abderrahmane Al Rachi as Layla's father
- Hichem Rostom as Layla's husband
- Fatima Ben Saïdane as the Mute
- Sid Ahmed Agoumi as Prince's envoy
