= The Island of Forgiveness =

2022 Tunisian-Italian drama film

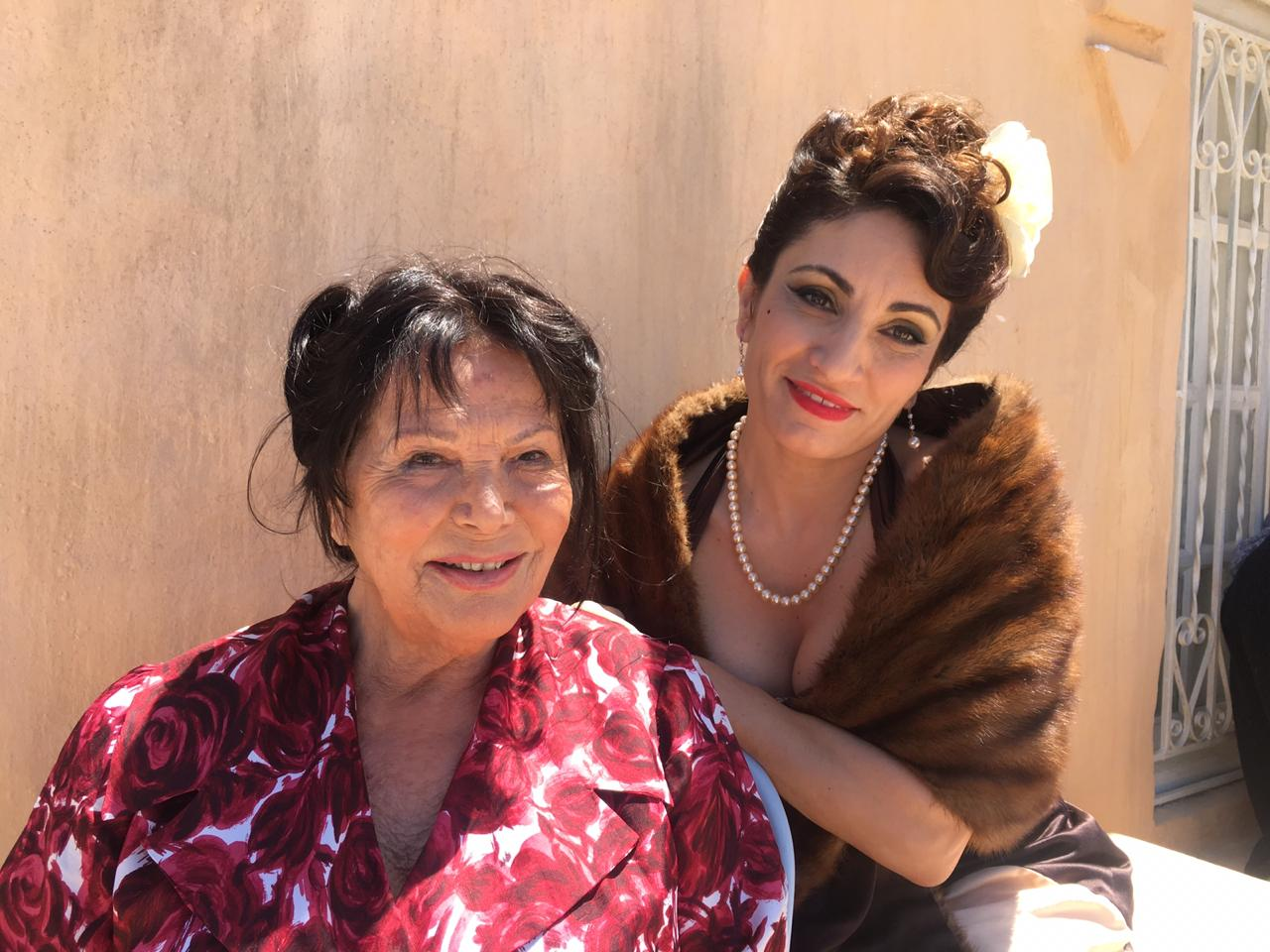
- Claudia Cardinale and Paola Lavini on set
- Directed by: Ridha Behi
- Written by: Ridha Behi; Ziad Hamzeh
- Starring: Chedly Arfaoui; Badis Behi; Mohamed Ali Ben Jemaa
- Music by: Marco Werba
- Release dates: March 15, 2022 (Tunisia); April 22, 2022 (Italy)
- Countries: Tunisia, Italy

The Island of Forgiveness is a 2022 Tunisian-Italian drama film directed by Ridha Behi and starring Chedly Arfaoui, Badis Behi, and Mohamed Ali Ben Jemaa. The film follows Andrea Licari, a successful author and professor of Italian descent who returns to his birthplace of Djerba, Tunisia, to fulfill his mother's wish of scattering her ashes there. Along the way, he confronts his past traumas and seeks forgiveness for himself and others. it was last film of Claudia Cardinale before her death.

The film premiered at the 44th Cairo International Film Festival, where it won the Silver Pyramid for Best Director and the Naguib Mahfouz Award for Best Screenplay. It also received six nominations at the 2022 Carthage Film Festival, including the Golden Tanit for Best Feature Film. The film was praised for its cinematography, music, and performances, especially by Chedly Arfaoui, who played the older Andrea.

The film was inspired by Behi's own personal experience of returning to Tunisia after living abroad for many years. He co-wrote the script with Ziad Hamzeh, who also served as one of the producers. The film was shot on location in Djerba and Rome, with a budget of $1 million. The film features a score composed by Marco Werba and songs by English singer Ellen Francis.

The film was released in Tunisia on March 15, 2022, and in Italy on April 22, 2022. It received positive reviews from critics and audiences, who praised its emotional and humanistic approach to the themes of identity, exile, and reconciliation. The film has a rating of 6.7/10 on IMDb¹ and 7.5/10 on ČSFD.cz, a Czech-Slovak film database.
