= Hichem Rostom =

Tunisian actor (1947–2022)

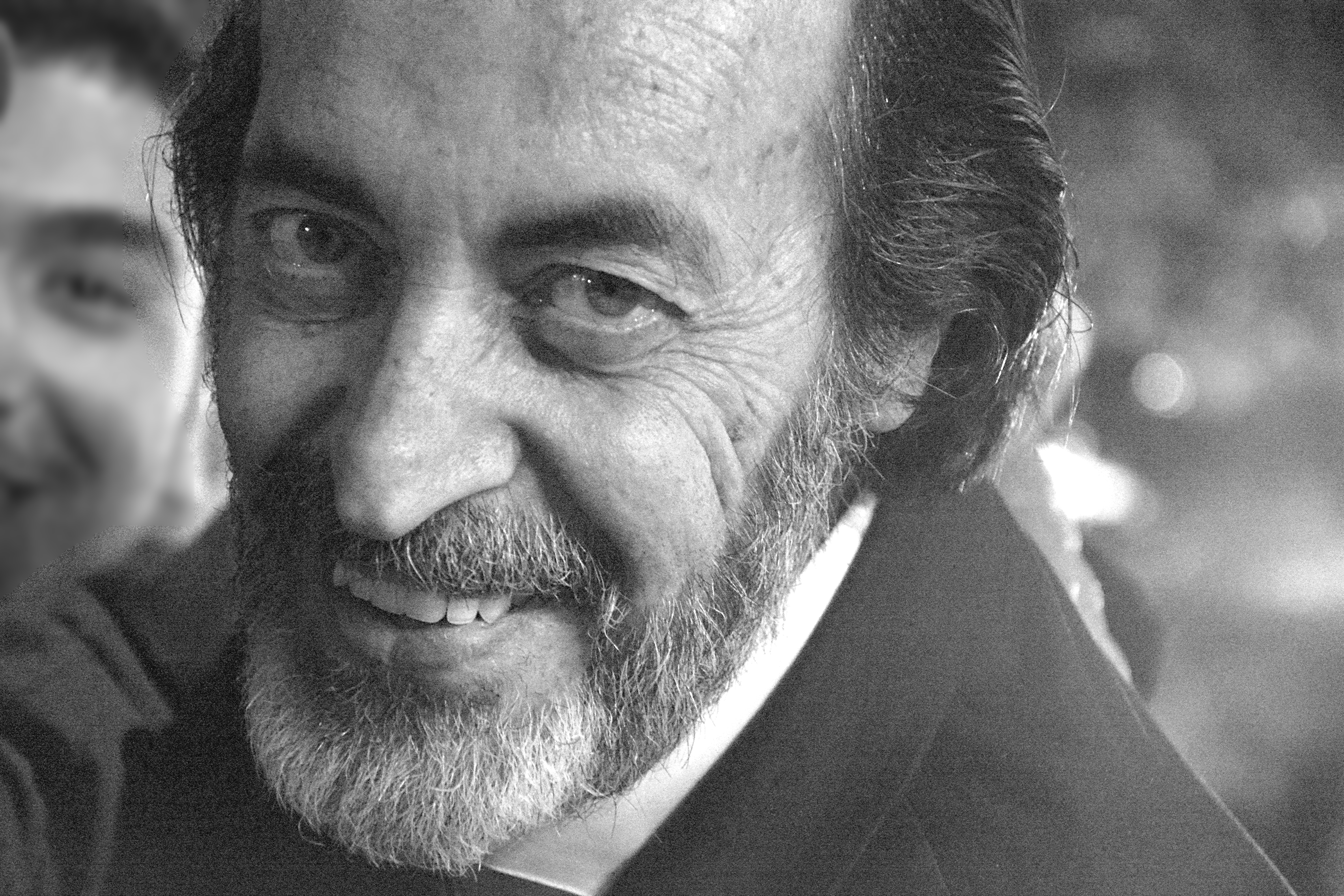
- Rostom in 2015
- Born: 26 May 1947; La Marsa, French Tunisia
- Burial place: Gammarth Cemetery
- Education: Sadiki College; Sorbonne University
- Occupation: Actor
- Years active: 1987–2022 (actor)
- Spouses: Martine Gafsi (divorced) Sana Ezzine (divorced)

Hichem Rostom (26 May 1947 – 28 June 2022) was a Tunisian actor. He appeared in more than 70 films and television shows since 1987. He starred in Golden Horseshoes, which was screened in the Un Certain Regard section at the 1989 Cannes Film Festival. He also directed the Carthage Theatre Festival for two sessions.

== Early life ==
Hichem Rostom was born in La Marsa, Tunisia, to a family of Circassian descent. In his youth, he studied at Sadiki College, Tunis, where he earned his Baccalaureate degree. He later moved to France to further his studies where he lived for years and graduated from Sorbonne University’s Institute of Theatre Studies and the Institut des hautes études cinématographiques (IDHEC). He also worked as an animator at Radio France and then at the National Popular Theater before be returned to Tunisia in 1988 to pursue a professional career as an actor after being offered a role in the Tunisian drama film Golden Horseshoes (Tunisian Arabic: صفايح ذهب, French: Les Sabots en or) in 1989, which he accepted.

Rostom showed a keen interest in acting at a young age because of his maternal grandfather, who used to take him to the Theater frequently. His acting talent was discovered by the Tunisian actor Ali Ben Ayed.

== Career ==
In 2017, Hichem Rostom helped in organizing the Rouhaniyet Festival in Nefta, Tunisia, which is an event where spiritual and Sufi songs were performed.

== Death ==
Rostom died on 28 June 2022, at the age of 75.

== Filmography ==
Year	Title	Role	Notes
1989	Majnoun Layla	Le mari de Layla	
1989	Golden Horseshoes	Youssef	
1991	Isabelle Eberhardt	Corporal	
1991	L'amico arabo		
1992	Obiettivo indiscreto	Manuel Le Roux	
1993	Le Nombril du Monde	Costa	
1994	The Silences of the Palace	Si Bechir / prince	
1994	Les hirondelles ne meurent pas à Jerusalem	Ilane	
1996	The English Patient	Fouad	
1996	Essaïda	Amine	
1998	Paparazzi	El Kabouli	
1999	Les Siestes Grenadine	Wahid Haydar	
2001	In Desert and Wilderness	Mahdi	
2002	Le Chant de la Noria		
2002	The Magic Box	Mansour	
2002	The Assassinated Sun	Bramsi	
2003	Colosseum: Rome's Arena of Death	Lanista	TV film
2004	Nadia et Sarra	Hedi	
2006	Azur & Asmar: The Princes' Quest		Voice
2007	La Télé Arrive	The Egyptian	
2007	Whatever Lola Wants	Nasser	
2008	Le Chant des mariées	père de Raoul / Raoul's father	
2011	Day of the Falcon	Nesibi Colonel	
2011	La 5ème Corde	Amir	
2014	Toefl Al-Shams	Kateb	
2015	Dicta Shot		
2015	Conflict	Mokhtar	
2016	The Flower of Aleppo	Hichem Mourad's Father	
2016	WOH!	Hmed	
2016	ser almarjane (Morocco)	Lahbib	
2017	ser almarjane 2(Morocco)	Lahbib	
2017	Hams Al-Maâ		
2018	Areias sussurrantes		
