= Tlamess =

2020 Tunisian narrative drama film

- Directed by: Ala Eddine Slim
- Written by: Ala Eddine Slim
- Produced by: Ala Eddine Slim; Juliette Lepoutre; Pierre Menahem
- Starring: Abdullah Miniawy; Souhir Ben Amara; Khaled Ben Aïssa
- Cinematography: Amine Messadi
- Edited by: Ala Eddine Slim
- Music by: Mondkopf; Frédéric D. Oberland; Oiseaux-Tempête; Stéphane Pigneul; Jean-Michel Pires
- Production companies: Exit Productions; Inside Productions; Madbox Studios; Still Moving
- Distributed by: Hakka Distribution; Potemkine Films; MAD Solutions
- Release date: May 2019 (Cannes)
- Running time: 120 minutes
- Countries: Tunisia; France
- Language: Arabic

Tlamess, is a 2019 Tunisian narrative drama film directed by Ala Eddine Slim and co-produced by director himself with Juliette Lepoutre and Pierre Menahem. The film stars Abdullah Miniawy, Souhir Ben Amara, and Khaled Ben Aïssa. The film tells the story of a soldier, who is granted one week's leave after the death of his mother, but he had another target to complete.

The film premiered at the 2019 Cannes Film Festival. It showed in theatres in France starting on 19 February 2020. The film received mixed reviews from critics and screened in many film festivals.

== Cast ==
- Abdullah Miniawy as S
- Souhir Ben Amara as F
- Khaled Ben Aïssa
