= International Relations Theory and the Third World =

International Relations Theory and the Third World is a collection of essays dealing with international relations theory from the perspective of non-great power actors. The book was edited by professor Stephanie Neuman and published in 1998 by St. Martin's Press. The book was among the first mainstream publications to deal extensively with third world theory. Robert Jervis called the essays in the book "informative and provocative".

Taken together, their essays as author mentions "demonstrate how exploring the Third World experience can broaden and enrich our understanding of how and why states interact in the international system."

== See also ==
- Postcolonialism (international relations)
