= A Summer in La Goulette =

1996 film by Ferid Boughedir

- Directed by: Férid Boughedir
- Written by: Férid Boughedir; Nouri Bouzid
- Produced by: Marsa Films / Cinarès Production
- Starring: Mustapha Adouani; Gamil Ratib; Sonia Mankaï
- Music by: Jean-Marie Sénia
- Distributed by: Les Films du Losange
- Release date: 1996
- Running time: 89 minutes
- Countries: France; Belgium; Tunisia
- Languages: French; Tunisian Arabic; Italian

A Summer in La Goulette (French: Un été à La Goulette, Arabic: صيف حلق الوادي, romanized: ṣayf Ḥalq el-Wādī) is a 1996 film by Tunisian director Férid Boughedir. It is a narrative of how intercommunal relations deteriorated in cosmopolitan La Goulette after the end of French rule, especially Muslim-Jewish relations affected by the Six-Day War and the rising impact of Islam on Tunisian society.

The film also features La Goulette native Claudia Cardinale as herself. The film was entered into the 46th Berlin International Film Festival.

== Plot ==
Youssef (Mustapha Adouani) is a Muslim who works on the TGM and lives in La Goulette. His best friends are Jewish Jojo the brik seller and Sicilian Catholic Giuseppe the fisherman, who are also his neighbours. Their daughters grow up together and share their prospects for life, but the landlord Hadj Beji (Gamil Ratib) has his eyes on Youssef's daughter Meriem (Sonia Mankaï).

== Cast ==
- Gamil Ratib : Hadj Beji
- Mustapha Adouani : Youssef
- Guy Nataf : Jojo
- Ivo Salerno : Giuseppe
- Michel Boujenah : TSF
- Claudia Cardinale : herself
- Sonia Mankaï : Meriem
- Ava Cohen-Jonathan : Tina
- Sarah Pariente : Gigi
- Kais Ben Messaoud : Chouchou
- Mohamed Driss : Miró

== See also ==
- Le Chant des mariées
