= Moufida Tlatli =

Tunisian film director (1947–2021)

- مفيدة التلاتلي
- Born: 4 August 1947; Sidi Bou Saïd, French Tunisia
- Died: 7 February 2021 (aged 73); Tunis, Tunisia
- Education: Institut des hautes études cinématographiques
- Occupations: Film director; film editor; politician
- Years active: 1970–2021
- Notable work: The Silences of the Palace

Moufida Tlatli (Tunisian Arabic: مفيدة التلاتلي; 4 August 1947 – 7 February 2021) was a Tunisian film director, screenwriter, and editor. She is best known for her breakthrough film The Silences of the Palace, which won several international awards and was praised by critics. She made two more well received movies,The Season of Men and Nadia and Sarra.

== Early life ==
Moufida Tlatli was born in Sidi Bou Said, a suburb of the capital Tunis, on 4 August 1947. Her interest in cinema was piqued by her philosophy teacher. She moved to Paris in 1965, where she studied film editing and screenplay at the Institut des hautes études cinématographiques. She subsequently went back to Tunisia in 1972 and started off as a film editor. One of the notable films she edited was Halfaouine Child of the Terraces (1990) by Férid Boughedir.

== Career ==
Moufida Tlatli made her directorial debut with The Silences of the Palace (1994). She drew inspiration for the film from the challenging experiences her mother endured as an Arab woman. The film was acclaimed critically and won several awards: Cannes Film Festival's Golden Camera, the Carthage Film Festival's Golden Tanit, British Film Institute's Sutherland Trophy, Toronto Film Festival's International Critics' Award, and Istanbul International Film Festival's Golden Tulip. It was later categorized as one of the ten best films from Africa by film director and critic Mark Cousins in September 2012.

The second film Moufida Tlatli directed, The Season of Men (2000), was screened in the Un Certain Regard section at the Cannes Film Festival that year. It was awarded the Grand Prix by the Arab World Institute, as well as awards at film festivals held in Namur, Valencia, Torino, and Stuttgart. She subsequently sat as a juror of the Cannes Film Festival. She became only the second director from the Maghreb to do so, after Boughedir one decade before. Her third and final film, Nadia and Sarra (2004), featured Palestinian actor–director Hiam Abbass in the title role.

== Later life ==
Tlatli was appointed as Minister of Culture by Tunisia's provisional government in 2011, following the Tunisian Revolution and the ousting of president Zine El Abidine Ben Ali.

Tlatli died of COVID-19 on 7 February 2021, at age 73. She was survived by her husband, Mohamed Tlatli, her daughter Selima Chaffai and son, Walid, and five grandchildren.

== Filmography ==
=== Editor ===
Year	Title	Reference
2004	Nadia and Sarra	
2000	The Season of Men	
1994	The Silences of the Palace	
1994	The Fire Dance	
1990	Halfaouine Child of the Terraces	
1990	The Song of The Rock	
1989	Leila's My Reason	
1988	The Trace	
1987	Arab Camera	
1986	Arab	
1984	Wanderers of The Desert	
1983	Crossings	
1982	Shadows of The Earth	
1980	Aziza	
1979	Nahla	
1978	A Ball and Dreams	
1977	Omar Katlato	
1975	Fatma 75	
1974	A People's Victory	
1974	Sajnène	
1972	In The Land of Trannani	

=== Director ===
Year	Title	Notes
2004	Nadia and Sarra	
2000	The Season of Men	
1994	The Silences of the Palace	

=== Writer ===
Year	Title	Notes
2004	Nadia and Sarra	
2000	The Season of Men	
1994	The Silences of the Palace	
