= Ridha Behi =

Tunisian director and producer

- رضا الباهي
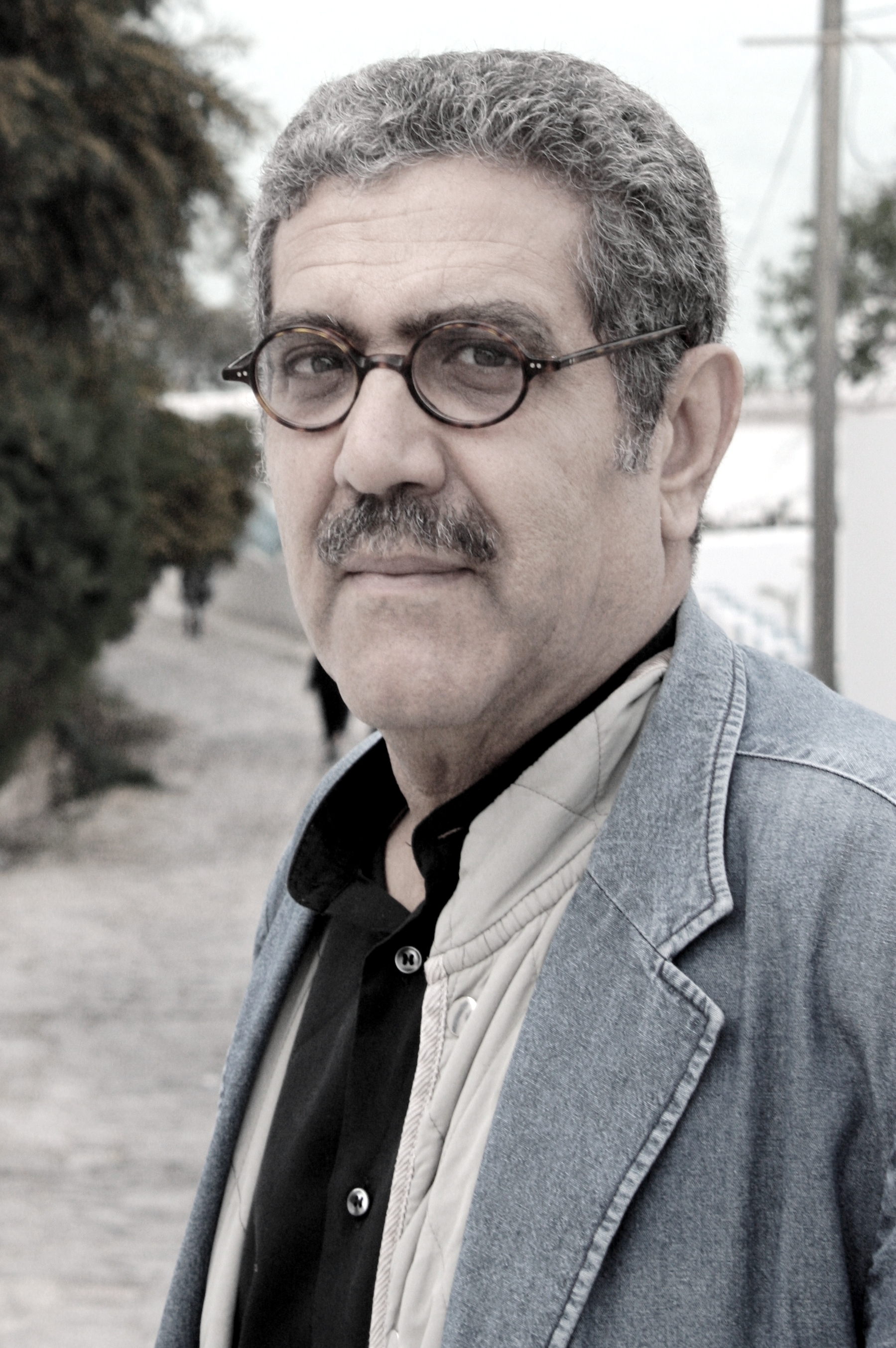
- Ridha Behi in 2014
- Born: 7 August 1947 (age 78); Kairouan
- Occupations: Director; Producer; Screenwriter
- Notable work: The Magic Box; Always Brando (2011)

Ridha Behi is a Tunisian director and producer. He is known for The Magic Box and Always Brando (2011).

== Career ==
Ridha Behi studied sociology and obtained a master's degree in 1973 at the Paris Nanterre University and a PhD at the Ecole Pratique des Hautes Etudes in 1977 with a thesis titled Cinema and Society in Tunisia in the 1960s under the management of Marc Ferro. As a Tunisian TV assistant, he wrote the scripts for three short films between 1964 and 1967, and in 1967 made his first short film, La Femme statue, as part of the Tunisian Federation of Amateur Filmmakers.

His first two feature films, The Hyena's Sun (transl. fr:Soleil des hyènes) (1977) and Les Anges (1984), were featured at the Directors' Fortnight at Cannes in 1977 and 1985 respectively. He directed the film Les hirondelles ne meurent pas à Jerusalem in 1994 which received the critic's award at Carthage Film Festival. His film The Magic Box was selected to be screened at Venice Film Festival, received a Special Jury Prize at Carthage Film Festival and also a special mention of the jury at the 22nd Amiens International Film Festival. It was selected as the Tunisian entry for the Best Foreign Language Film at the 75th Academy Awards, but it was not nominated.

He announced his new feature film initially titled Brando and Brando with Marlon Brando portraying himself. But the filming was interrupted by the death of Marlon Brando. The film was finally released as Always Brando in the year 2011. The film was selected to be screened in Toronto International Film Festival.

A teacher at the Higher School of Audiovisual and Cinema of Gammarth, he leads various writing workshops around the world, including Méditalents, which he chaired in Morocco in 2012.

His film The Flower of Aleppo was released in the year 2016. It was selected as the Tunisian entry for the Best Foreign Language Film at the 89th Academy Awards, but was changed to As I Open My Eyes by Leyla Bouzid. The film had its initial release at the 27th Carthage Film Festival on 28 October 2016, then it had its regular release in Tunisia on 6 November 2016.

He also directed a dozen of documentaries in Arab states of the Persian Gulf between 1979 and 1983, and a series for the channel Al Jazeera titled Portraits of filmmakers, between 2006 and 2008.

== Filmography ==
=== As director, writer and producer ===
Year	Film	Credited as			Notes	Ref
Year	Film	Director	Producer	Writer	Notes	Ref
1970	Autumn Rain			Yes		
1977	The Hyena’s Sun	Yes		Yes		
1984	Les Anges	Yes				
1986	Champagne amer	Yes		Yes		
1994	Les hirondelles ne meurent pas à Jerusalem	Yes		Yes		
2002	The Magic Box	Yes	Yes	Yes		
2011	Always Brando	Yes	Yes	Yes		
2016	The Flower of Aleppo	Yes	Yes	Yes		
2020	The Island of Forgiveness	Yes	Yes	Yes	Post-production	

=== As short film director ===
- 1967 – La femme statue
- 1972 – The Forbidden Thresholds

== Awards and honours ==
- Officer of Tunisian Order of Merit – (2004)
- Tribute to the Tetouan Mediterranean Film Festival – (2013)
- Grand Officer of the Tunisian Order of Merit – (2016)
- "Grand Prix Tribute" of Carthage Film Festival – (2017)
- Award for Best Director at the International Film Festival of the Mediterranean Countries of Alexandria – (2017)
- Winner of the Public prize at the Mons International Film Festival – (2017)

He is a regular Member or President of Juries in the Arab world:

- 2008 – Jury member (video) of the Carthage Film Festival
- 2014 – Jury member (feature films) of the Luxor African Film Festival
- 2018 – Member of the Grand jury of Carthage Film Festival
- 2019 – Jury member of the Malmö Arab Film Festival (Sweden)
