= Always Brando =

- Directed by: Ridha Behi
- Written by: Ridha Behi
- Produced by: Ziad Hamzeh
- Starring: Marlon Brando; Ridha Behi
- Production companies: Alya Films; Hamzeh Mystique Films; Cinemada
- Release date: 8 September 2011 (Toronto International Film Festival)
- Running time: 90 minutes
- Country: France
- Languages: French; English

Always Brando is a 2011 film directed by Tunisian director Ridha Behi. Originally titled Brando and Brando, it was set to star Marlon Brando and Christian Erickson until Brando's death. The film premiered at 2011 Toronto International Film Festival then Abu Dhabi Film Festival where producers Ziad Hamzeh and Ridha Behi received the Black Pearl award for best producers.

== Plot ==
The film is about a Tunisian man who looks like Marlon Brando trying to "make it big" in Hollywood.

== Cast ==
- Anis Raach as Anis
- Souhir Ben Amara as Zina
- Marlon Brando as himself (archive footage)
- Christian Erickson
- Ridha Behi
- Ziad Hamzeh English Narration

== Background ==
The project was on hold due to the star's death but the script has been reworked to continue the project. Filming began in 2010 with the film due for release in 2011. Originally, the project was announced at the 2004 Cannes Film Festival as a project starring Marlon Brando and originally to be titled Brando and Brando, with Brando portraying himself. Behi initially had difficulties approaching Brando and getting him to sign onto the project, with their initial meeting lasting over 5 hours. Brando eventually threw himself into the project, working with Behi on the script and making "significant changes" to "a story of broken spirits". Brando was quoted as saying of the script: "I've found it very deeply affecting." Up to a week before his death, Brando was working on the script in anticipation of a July/August 2004 start date, in Tunisia and Los Angeles. Production was suspended in July 2004 following Brando's death, at which time Behi stated that would continue the film as an homage to Brando.

== Production ==
Production resumed two years later under the new title of Always Brando. The original script called for the protagonist to come face to face with Brando, but following Brando's death, and while still embodying this story, the film will now chronicle Behi's own problems in making the movie, and will include footage of Brando that Behi shot before Brando's death, becoming part fiction and part documentary.
