= Bezness =

1992 film by Nouri Bouzid

- Bezness
- Directed by: Nouri Bouzid
- Screenplay by: Nouri Bouzid
- Produced by: Ahmed Bahaeddine Attia
- Starring: Mustapha Adouani; Abdellatif Kechiche; Jacques Penot
- Production company: Cinétéléfilms
- Release date: 1992
- Running time: 110 minutes
- Country: Tunisia

Bezness (Arabic: بزناس) is a 1992 Tunisian film directed by Nouri Bouzid.

== Synopsis ==
Fred, a French photographer, is in Sousse, Tunisia, to report on the 'Bezness' (male sex workers). He befriends Roufa, a local sex worker who dreams of leaving Sousse for Europe. Through Roufa, Fred discovers a world where young men are confronted with the tensions between tradition and modernity.

The film is a portrait of the struggle of youth, confronted with the competing influences of the west and the east, tradition and modernity.

== General information ==
- Director: Nouri Bouzid
- Scenario: Nouri Bouzid
- Editing: Kahéna Attia
- Images : Alain Levent
- Sound: Hachemi Joulak
- Music: Anouar Brahem
- Production: Ahmed Bahaeddine Attia (Cinétéléfilms)
- Country of origin: Tunisia
- Language: Arabic
- Genre: Dramatic comedy

== Cast ==
- Mustapha Adouani
- Manfred Andrae
- Abdellatif Kechiche : Roufa
- Ghalia Lacroix : Khomsa
- Jacques Penot : Fred
