= Golden Horseshoes =

1989 film

- Directed by: Nouri Bouzid
- Written by: Nouri Bouzid
- Produced by: Ahmed Baha Attia
- Starring: Hichem Rostom
- Cinematography: Youssef Ben Youssef
- Edited by: Kahéna Attia
- Release date: 1989
- Running time: 104 minutes
- Country: Tunisia
- Language: Arabic

Golden Horseshoes (Arabic: صفايح ذهب, translit. Safa'ih min dhahab, French: Les Sabots en or) is a 1989 Tunisian drama film directed by Nouri Bouzid. It was screened in the Un Certain Regard section at the 1989 Cannes Film Festival.

== Plot ==
Youssef Soltane, a 45-year-old Tunisian intellectual, is the product of a generation that lived the era of euphoria and great ideologies in the sixties, and their subsequent failure. He was incarcerated and tortured for his political opinions. Furthermore, his relationship with Zineb, a young, beautiful bourgeois, only brings him more trouble. During one long winter night, Youssef wanders in search of an emotional haven, prey to all the questions that flood his memory.

== Cast ==
- Hichem Rostom as Youssef
- Hamadi Zarrouk
- Michket Krifa
- Chadia Azzouz
- Fatma Attia
- Sondos Belhassen
- Saida Ben Chedli
- Bechir Bouzaiane
- Walid Bouzayane
- Sabah Bouzouita
- Marianne Catzaras
- Khaled El Bibi
- Martine Gafsi
- Fethi Haddaoui
- Rym Kechiche
- Farah Khadar
- Rached Manai
