= L'enfant Roi =

- Directed by: Mohamed Houssine Grayaâ
- Screenplay by: Souleyman Djigo Diop, Ameur Mathlouthi
- Produced by: Audimage, 5 dimensions, La Méditerranéenne
- Edited by: Julien Hecker
- Music by: Kaïs Ben Mabrouk
- Release date: 2009
- Running time: 30 minutes
- Country: Tunisia

L'enfant Roi is a 2009 short film.

== Synopsis ==
Once upon a time in Africa, a village called Nidiobina was ravaged by fire. Two of its inhabitants Foudi Mamaya and his wife are forced to leave their village in search of food leaving behind their only son, Bouba, in the care of his grandfather Wali. Wali teaches his grandson how to become a man, and Bouba becomes a gifted pupil.

== Awards ==
- Jornadas del Cine Europeo de Túnez 2008
