= Nouri Bouzid =

Tunisian film director

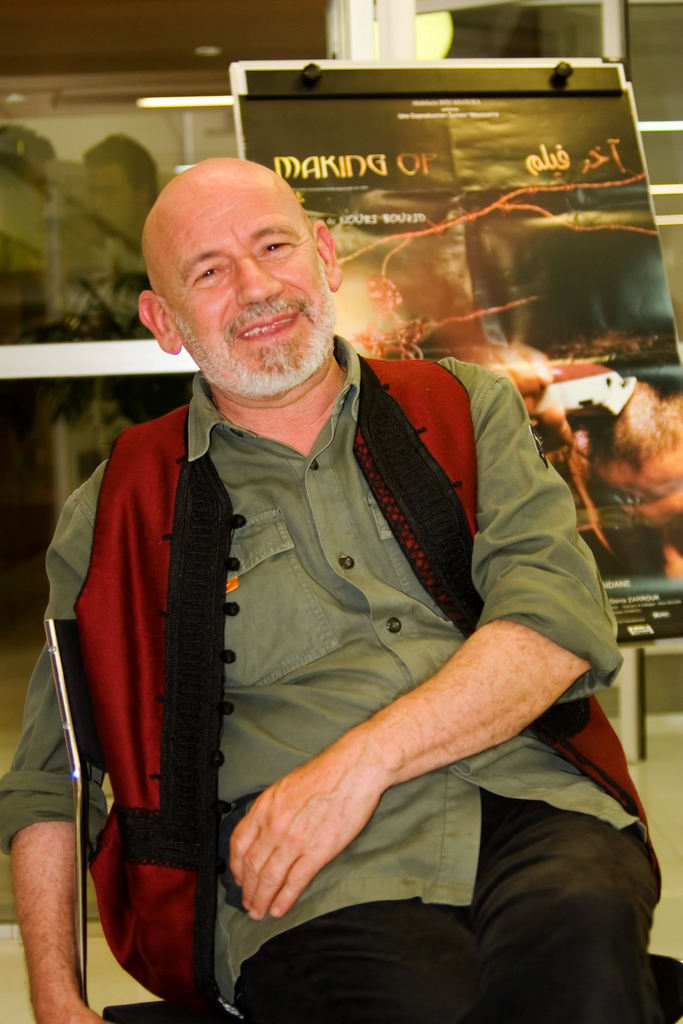
- Born: 1945 (age 80–81); Sfax, Tunisia
- Citizenship: Tunisian
- Occupations: Film director Screenwriter
- Years active: 1986 - 2006
- Known for: Man of Ashes, Golden Horseshoes, Bezness, Un été à La Goulette, Bent Familia, The Season of Men
- Awards: Ibn Rushd Prize for Freedom of Thought

Nouri Bouzid (born 1945) is a Tunisian film director and screenwriter. He has directed seven films between 1986 and 2006. His film Man of Ashes was screened in the Un Certain Regard section the 1986 Cannes Film Festival. Three years later, his film Golden Horseshoes was screened in the same section at the 1989 festival.

Bouzid was featured in a 2009 documentary film about the experience of cinema in different cultures called Cinema Is Everywhere.

== Selected filmography ==
- Man of Ashes (1986)
- Golden Horseshoes (1989)
- Bezness (1992)
- The Silences of the Palace (1994 - writer)
- A Summer in La Goulette (1996 - writer)
- Bent Familia (1997)
- The Season of Men (2000 - writer)
- Making Of (2006)

== Awards ==
- The Ibn Rushd Prize for Freedom of Thought for the year 2007 in Berlin.
- Officer of the Order of Arts and Letters (France, 2009)
- Knight of the Legion of Honour (France, 2013)
- Special Human Rights Award (Venice Film Festival, 2019)
