= Child of the Sun (film) =

2014 film

Children of the Sun
- Directed by: Taïeb Louhichi
- Written by: Taïeb Louhichi
- Starring: Mohamed Mrad; Mabô Kouyaté; Sarra Hannachi; Hichem Rostom; Jamel Madani
- Cinematography: Nara Keo Kosal
- Release date: 19 February 2014
- Country: Tunisia
- Languages: French, Arabic

Children of the Sun (Persian: Toefl Al-Shams; French: L'Enfant du Soleil) is a 2014 Tunisian drama film directed by Taieb Louhichi. After a night out and about, three youth break into a villa, only to discover that the wheelchair-using owner of the villa is actually inside. Faced by a prospect that they never accounted for, they soon come to know the owner, whom they discover is a writer.

== Cast ==
- Mohamed Mrad : Fafou
- Mabô Kouyaté : Yanis
- Sarra Hannachi : Sonia
- Hichem Rostom : Kateb
- Jamel Madani
