= Les Deux Souris blanches =

- Directed by: Zouhaier Mahjoub
- Produced by: Hassen Daldoul
- Edited by: Joulak Faouzia
- Music by: Hichem Jerbi
- Release date: 1974
- Running time: 15 minutes
- Country: Tunisia

Les Deux Souris blanches is a 1974 film directed by Zouhaier Mahjoub.

== Synopsis ==
An evil witch called Khira transforms a couple of princes, Jamil and Jamila, into two white mice. She also tells them that they will not recover their human form again until another human discovers the strongest person in the world, capable of making her perish by fire.
