= Communication for social change =

Communication for sustainable social change and development

Communication for social change also referred to as communication for sustainable social change and development, involves the use of a variety of communication techniques to address inefficient systems, processes, or modes of production within a specific location that has not incurred major technological advances. Different mediums and approaches are used to help individuals among the targeted society to acquire new knowledge and skills. This will allow communities not only to experience change but to guide it as well.

A possible strategy in achieving sustainability and development places the people of the community in the center of the communication process. This technique is also known as the participatory approach where interpersonal communication is exercised through community media. The members of the culture are agents of change as opposed to the outsiders who may provide any necessary tools. Technology then becomes implemented by people in their social and economic contexts and results in a major shaping process. The participatory approach can be combined with three other types of communicative methods to effectively invoke social change. These include: behavior change communication, mass communication, and advocacy communication.

Different types of mediums can be used in achieving governance, health and sustainable development. Old media can be combined with new media to educate specific populations. Information and communication technologies (ICTs) in addition to multi-media are able to address visual, auditory and kinesthetic learners and prove to be an important contribution to economic growth. Questions need to be raised about who the stake holders, policy makers, partners and practitioners are and what their goals might be for the community seeking sustainable development. Oftentimes, those who set the agenda are the ones doing the funding for the project and may include international agencies, bilateral agencies, national authorities, NGOs, and local organizations.

Prior to the project, decision makers consider if introducing new technology will disrupt religion, language, political organization, economy, familial relations and social complexity of the targeted society. Other factors have to be acknowledged as well and may include already present policies and legislations, educational systems, service provisions, institutional and organizational constructions (in the forms of corruption, bureaucracy, etc.), socio-demographic and economic aspects, and the physical environment.

== MDGs ==
The Millennium Development Goals (MDGs) are an official set of universal goals created by world leaders and adopted by the United Nations to be completed within a specific time frame (2000–2015). They address various aspects of human development and are categorized into eight objectives:

1. Eradicate Extreme Hunger and Poverty
2. Achieve Universal Primary Education
3. Promote Gender Equality and Empower Women
4. Reduce Child Mortality
5. Improve Maternal Health
6. Combat HIV/AIDS, Malaria and other diseases
7. Ensure Environmental Sustainability
8. Develop a Global Partnership for Development

These goals tackle extreme poverty in multiple parts of the world but with already pre-existing setbacks, their feasibility is questioned. Progress in Latin America and the Caribbean, sub-Saharan Africa, and the Middle East and North Africa, combined, was a tenth met of the last agreed target.

== Latin America ==
Statistics
- Area: 21,069,501 km^{2} (8,134,980 sq mi)
- Population: 572,039,894
- Population density: 27/km^{2} (70/sq mi)
- Demonym: Latin American, American
- Countries: 20
- Dependencies: 0
- Languages: Spanish, Portuguese, Quechua, Mayan languages, Guaraní, French, Aymara, Nahuatl, Italian and others.
- Time zone: UTC-2 to UTC-8
- Largest cities: 1. Mexico City; 2. (Brazil) São Paulo; 3. (Argentina) Buenos Aires; 4. (Brazil) Rio de Janeiro; 5. (Peru) Lima; 6. (Colombia) Bogotá; 7. (Chile) Santiago; 8. (Brazil) Belo Horizonte; 9. (Mexico) Guadalajara; 10. (Venezuela) Caracas

Development in Latin America has been discussed since the early 1950s and began with the diffusion of innovations concept where countries like Brazil and Colombia would incorporate models brought by developed countries to foster economic growth, use media for technological and scientific advancements, address local problems and manage processes of modernization. In the 1970s such type of development was criticized because it responded to the interests of the wealthier, already developed countries. As development efforts continued to fail and socio-economic and financial limitations surfaced, the 1980s were described as La Decada Perdida (The lost decade in Latin America).

Development in Latin America is not the same as for countries more economically advanced like the United States. The differences are not only economic but social and cultural as well. Any intervention has to take into account the context in which change can be implemented and address not only the elite culture but the popular one as well. Interactive, digital, and participatory technology is encouraged to take part in the development process more so to educate members of the community and to encompass popular innovations and individual creativity. Public policies in information technologies need to reflect local development in order to guide practices of change for other regions. Concurrently, they need to promote members of the community to stimulate change by finding their own meaning in applications that could potentially improve quality of life. In order to reduce inequality First Human Development Report for Latin America & the Caribbean proposes that policies must affect people (reach), address setbacks that cause poverty (breadth) and empower people to create the change desired (ownership). This type of thinking is a new approach to development and may be one possible solution to combat the eight objectives of human development in Latin America the Millennium Development Goals strive to address.

=== Setbacks for development ===
World Bank classifies Latin America in the lower middle and upper middle income range. An estimated 181 million individuals (33.2 percent of the population) live in poverty and seventy-one million of these (12.9 percent) in indigence. Between 2002 and 2008, forty-one million people were able to sustain enough progress to no longer be characterized as poverty but with the current Global recession, this number has decreased by nine million. Ten of the 15 countries with the highest levels of inequality are in the region. Women, indigenous populations and those of African descent are most affected. Females in the region take a greater part in the informal economy and have double the workload than males but are paid less for their efforts. When compared to those of European descent, twice as many members of indigenous and African descended populations, on average, live on US$1 per day. Latin America still faces corrupt political, judicial, and security institutions protective of the interests of the wealthy. The second edition of the Global Burden of Armed Violence report by the Secretariat of the Geneva Declaration on Armed Violence and Development, released in October 2011, characterized El Salvador as being the "most violent country in the world" during 2004–9, with an average annual violent death rate of over 60 per 100,000 people during that period, just ahead of Iraq. During the first week of November (2011), Manuel Melgar (the justice and public security minister of El Salvador) resigned from his post. The region overall is second to South Africa in terms of levels of crime and violence. Educational practices are also being questioned across the region. Chile has been experiencing five months of protests against the government's attempt to maintain the higher education's private sector model. Students and teachers in opposition hope to revert to a state funded model, under an "Education for All" slogan in fear of emerging from universities with debts and loans. These street demonstrations, now catching congress' attention, are a threat to Chiles' 2012 budget. Without the proposed spending, potential education, health, training and anti-poverty programs will cease. In Latin America, risks of inflation and excessive currency appreciation are a concern to the region's long-term growth prospects and present instability in the financial sector. Current events such as the European debt crisis, the slow recovery in the US, natural and nuclear disasters in Japan and the implications from the political turmoil in the Middle East stall progress within the region and foreshadow more difficult economic conditions.

=== Progress ===
Growth in Latin America – not including the Caribbean region – is expected to average between 3.5 and 4.5 percent of GDP in 2011 (better than economic activity in some developed nations). Progress is attributed to current macroeconomic management, a constant domestic demand, commodity export boom, and the commodity increase in prices which have spurred investments in mining and energy. Unemployment rates have dropped down to seven percent and current results are better than in most North American areas and some wealthier European nations. In the fiscal year 2011, World Bank Group has produced $14.7 billion in funding for the region. Contributions have been made by International Bank for Reconstruction and Development (IBRD), the International Development Association (IDA), the International Finance Corporation (IFC) and the Multilateral Investment Guarantee Agency (MIGA). Most of the funding was devoted to health, social, transportation, and public administration services. Countries that received the most financial help were Mexico ($2.7 billion), Brazil ($2.5 billion), and Argentina ($2.2 billion). Funding stimulates development which in turn promotes investment as the current case in Latin America. UN's Economic Commission for Latin America (Eclac) calculated that foreign direct investment (FDI) in 18 Latin American and Caribbean countries totaled to US$82.65bn in the first half of 2011 (up 54% compared to the same period during 2010). These numbers are on the path to be a new historic record in 2011.

Countries with highest FDI increase

1. Brazil – Received US$44bn in FDI in the first six months of 2011 (an increase of 157% from the same 2010 period).
2. Colombia – FDI jumped 91%, to nearly US$7bn (more than it received in all of 2010).
3. Venezuela – US$1.18bn in the first half of 2011

Progress in Latin America has also been attributed to higher employment rates. In Colombia alone, 700,000 jobs were created since Juan Carlos Echeverry took up presidency in 2010. The government wants to create 2.5 million additional jobs by the end of 2014. In addition to employment opportunities, efforts to improve education are in progress. In February 2010, the World Bank and Shakira's advocacy group ALAS Foundation launched a joint venture to improve Early Childhood Development for low income children in Latin America. During the first year of the program, more than half a million kids were provided with health care, adequate nutrition and early education.

Thirty-five percent of Belize's population is under the age of fourteen. The country has the highest HIV prevalence in Central America and the third-highest in the Caribbean after the Bahamas and Haiti, according to a 2007 study. UNAIDS estimates some 3,600 people are currently living with HIV in Belize, 2,000 of which are women. As of December 2010, UNDP began implementing an HIV/AIDS grant agreement designed by the Global Fund to Fight AIDS, Tuberculosis, & Malaria. The program aims to halt the spread of HIV in Belize by educating young people aged 15–24 about implications, prevention and treatment. Global Fund and UNDP are also providing access to condoms, subsidized referrals, testing, anti-retroviral drugs free of cost at all treatment points, psychosocial support to people living with HIV, and specialized training to professional service providers.

Over the last 20 years Mexico experienced a number of reforms to increase representation of indigenous peoples (13 percent of the country's total population) in order to ensure their participation in decision-making. The Mexican Government approved 28 indigenous territorial boundaries and electoral districts which have been highlighted in the documentary Indigenous Identity and Democracy in Mexico. UNDP is currently working with the Spanish Agency for International Cooperation Development (AECID) to have government and indigenous groups from Bolivia and Mexico share experiences in electoral and political participation.

The region has also incurred technological advances to combat climate change. The Global Environment Facility of UNDP in collaboration with the Brazilian Ministry of Mines and Energy (MME), Empresa Metropolitana de Transportes Urbanos de São Paulo (EMTU/SP) while financed with resources from the Global Environmental Facility (GEF) and Financiadora de Estudos e Projetos (FINEP) were able to create the first hydrogen-powered bus in Latin America. The Brazilian Hydrogen-Cell-Fueled Bus project announced the finished product on July 1 of 2010. The city of São Paulo, Brazil, with eighteen million inhabitants, now has a hydrogen-powered bus fueled by water that exudes clean vapor instead of fumes and carbon dioxide. The bus can carry 63 passengers and with hydrogen alone can run up to 300 km.

== Africa ==
Traditional media practitioners in Africa are making adaptive changes to keep up with the new, more dynamic and interactive media era. Journalism in particular has grown exponentially, with bloggers and citizen journalists advocating for good governance and other ideals. Although the technology and methods of the media have changed dramatically over the past 15 years, society still expects the media to play its traditional role of communication, education and entertainment. In Africa, the media plays a more critical role in furthering the development and institutionalization of democracy, because as the state assumes new responsibilities in today's globalized world, citizens must be adequately educated and informed. The journalism that Africa needs in the process of its modernization should not only innovate itself, but also support innovation. Can not only self-growth, but also can promote the growth of others and social development; It can not only generate thinking as the driving force of social transformation, but also preside over the debate caused by social change.

Due to the lag of economic development, the development level of media in Africa is far behind that in other parts of the world, but this undoubtedly provides a huge market for many foreign media, especially western media. Beginning in the 1980s, various international channels began to enter and gradually occupy the African television market. At present, most African countries lack experience and capacity in program production and other fields, and there is a great demand for program mode and program production. Their TV channels need to broadcast other countries' TV programs. In some African countries, for example, international media outlets such as CNN and the BBC are often heavily broadcast on television to fill the airtime gap.

== India ==
The disproportionate distribution of population between rural and urban areas, as well as, severe inequality between levels of socioeconomic status among demographic composition, has hindered social progress in India. Communication tactics to aid in these social changes are frequently reliant on communal governance, policy, and economic prosperity, as change becomes more difficult without this infrastructure. An essential marker and contributor to social change is the economic prosperity of a country. As of 2019, the United Nations has approximated that 364 million individuals (29 percent of the population) live in poverty. A significant improvement from the levels of poverty estimated in 1951–1974, standing at upwards of 47% of the total population living in poverty. The cultural roles that Indian society revolves around have also had a substantial impact on social change; for instance, the diminished role of women within the Indian community has gated social mobility, particularly for women and young girls. However, with the introduction of new media technologies, there has been a shift in this paradigm. Not only are new media alternatives allowing for the maneuverability of disadvantaged minorities within society, it has also allowed for greater communication between urban and rural areas, illuminating the needs of rural communities.
