= Nidhal Guiga =

Tunisian actress, writer and film director

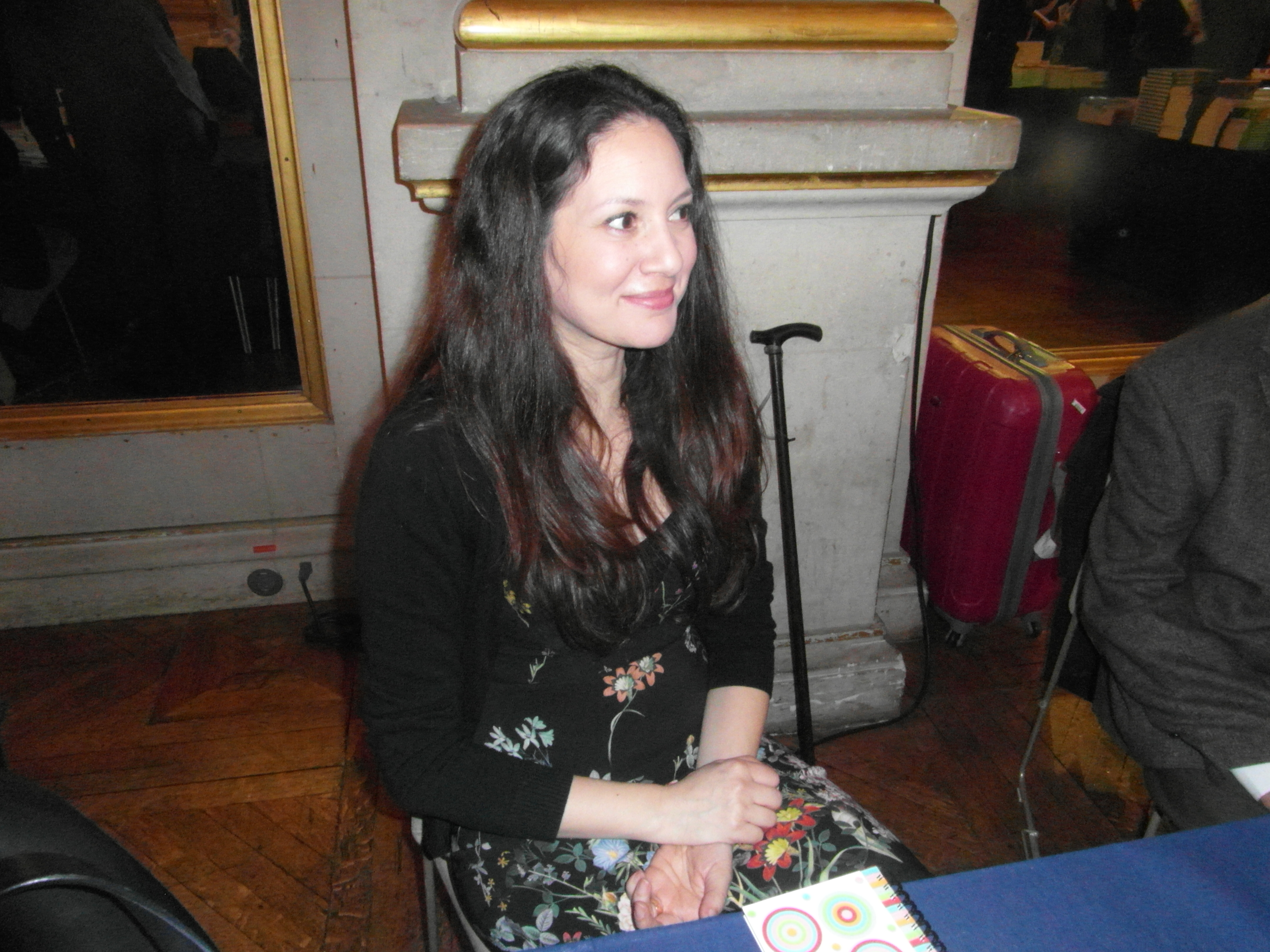
- Born: March 11, 1975 (age 51)
- Occupations: Actress, writer, film director
- Years active: 2004-present

Nidhal Guiga (born 11 March 1975) is a Tunisian actress, writer, and film director.

== Biography ==
Guiga has a doctorate in linguistics and began teaching at the university level in 2002. In 2006, Guiga wrote and directed the play Une heure et demie après moi, produced by the Tunisian National Theater. In 2008, she directed Selon Gagarine, also produced by the Tunisian National Theater. In 2012, Guiga published her debut novel Mathilde B., which was awarded the Zoubeïda B'chir prize. Also in 2012, she began working as a columnist for Radio Tunis Chaîne Internationale and performed the radio plays Antigone and Rhinoceros. In 2013, she wrote Pronto Gagarin, which was selected in the Contemporary Arab Dramaturgies project. The play was presented at the Festival d'Avignon in 2014.

In 2014, Guiga wrote and directed the short comedy film A Capella, involving a discussion between a man and woman. She wrote her second novel, Tristesse Avenue, and had it published in 2015. Also in 2015, Guiga translated La vie est un songe, a play by the Spanish playwright Pedro Calderón de la Barca, into Tunisian Arabic.

Nidhal Guiga in 2023

In 2017, Guiga directed the short film Astra, which premiered at the Dubai International Film Festival as part of the Muhr Short Competition. It was produced by Nomadis, and its plot revolves around Dali, a man who looks after his daughter Douja, who has Down's syndrome, and their adventure to Astra amusement park. Astra received the Bronze Tanit for fiction short film at the Carthage Film Festival. Her short film Silencio was released in 2020 and examines social isolation. Guiga lives in Tunis.

== Filmography ==
- 2004: Nadia et Sarra (actress, as Dalila)
- 2004: Le Prince (actress, as Narjes)
- 2008: Thirty (actress, as Mathilde Bourguiba)
- 2014: A Capella (Short film, writer/director/actress)
- 2017: Astra (Short film, writer/director/actress)
- 2020: Silencio (Short film, director)
