= Taïeb Louhichi =

Tunisian film director (1948–2018)

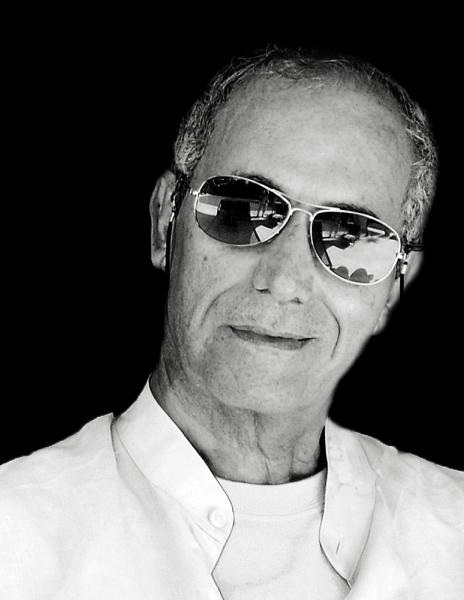
- Taïeb Louhichi in February 2013
- Born: June 16, 1948; Mareth, Tunisia
- Died: February 21, 2018 (aged 69)
- Education: Vaugirard Street School
- Occupation: filmmaker . screenwriter . film director . producer
- Notable work: Shadow of the Earth, Layla My Reason, La Danse Du Vent
- Website: www.taieblouhichi.com

Taïeb Louhichi (June 16, 1948 – February 21, 2018) was a Tunisian film director, screenwriter, producer and filmmaker. His best known works include his debut feature film, Shadow of the Earth (1982), Layla, My Reason (1989), and La Danse Du Vent (2004).

== Early life and education ==
Louhichi was born in 1948 in Mareth, Tunisia. He initially studied literature and obtained a doctorate in sociology before transitioning to filmmaking.

== Career ==
Louhichi shot several short films such as Mon Village, un Village Parmi Tant D'Autres (My Village, A Village Among Others), winner of the Golden Tanit at the Cinematographic Days of Carthage in 1972, El Khammes (The Sharecropper), awarded in many festivals in 1976 and Carthage, year 12. He released his first feature film, Shadow of the Earth, in 1982. Shadow of the Earth won several awards at the 8th Panafrican Film and Television Festival of Ouagadougou (FESPACO), including best screenplay. Louhichi's debut was also screened by the International Critics' Week in Cannes.

In 1989, Louhichi shot and released Layla, My Reason, which was selected for competition at the Venice Film Festival. Two years later, Layla, My Reason won the Audience Award at the inaugural Festival del cinema africano, d'Asia e America Latina di Milano in 1991. He was also named Chevalier de l'Ordre des Arts et des Lettres in France.

Louhichi suffered serious injuries in a 2006 car accident in the United Arab Emirates while visiting the country to chair the jury of an Emirati film festival.

Prominent figure in Arab and African cinema, several tributes are paid to him to highlight his journey. In 2011, he filmed the documentary Les Gens de l'Etincelle (People of the Spark) on the Tunisian Revolution. He released L'Enfant Du Soleil (Child Of The Sun) in 2013. His last feature film, La Rumeur de l'Eau (Water Rumours) was released, posthumously, in theaters in Tunisia on March 2, 2018.

In 2020, his hometown Mareth is organizing the first edition of the Taïeb Louhichi Film Festival. A Taïeb Louhichi film club is established in Gabès, and the House of Culture in Mareth also perpetuates his memory by being named in his honor.

== Filmography ==
=== Feature films ===
- 1982 : L'Ombre de la terre (Shadow of the Earth)
- 1989 : Layla, My Reason (Majnoun Layla)
- 1998 : Noces de lune (Wedding Of The Moon)
- 2003 : La Danse du vent (Dance Of The Wind)
- 2013 : Toefl Al-Shams (Child Of The Sun)
- 2017 : La Rumeur de l'eau (Water Rumours)

=== Short films ===
- 1970 : Masques
- 1971 : Loge d'artiste
- 1971 : Le Cri de pierre
- 1971 : Labyrinthes
- 1973 : Ziara ou visite à l'aïeul marabout (Visit To The Forefather Marabou)
- 1975 : El Khammès (The Sharecropper)
- 1978 : Carthage an 12 (Carthage, Year 12)
- 1994 : Le chant du Baye Fall (The Song Of The Baye Fall)
- 1995 : La Cité des sciences à Tunis (The City Of Sciences Of Tunis)
- 1999 : La Force des petits (The strength of the young)
- 2000 : Le Fil d'Oumou Sy (The Thread Of Oumou Sy)

=== Documentaries ===
- 1972 : Mon village, un village parmi tant d'autres (My Village, A Village Among Others)
- 1977 : Le Temps d'apprendre (A Time To Learn)
- 1983 : Gabès, l'oasis et l'usine (Gabes, The Oasis And The Factory)
- 1987 : Gorée, l'île du grand-père (Gorée, Island of the Grand-Father)
- 1990 : La Famille productive (The Productive Family)
- 1992 : Écrans d'Afrique (Screens Of Africa)
- 1994 : Kër Jo Ouakam
- 2004 : Opéra Ibn Sina, le making-of (Ibn Sina Opera, The Making-Of)
- 2012 : Les Gens de l'étincelle (People Of The Spark)

== Death ==
Taïeb Louhichi died on February 21, 2018, at the age of 69.

== Honors ==
- Carthage Film Festival (1972) : Golden Tanit (short documentary) for Mon village, un village parmi tant d'autres (My village, a village among others)
- Carthage Film Festival (1976) : Critics' Prize (short documentary) for El Khammès (The Sharecropper)
- International Short Film Festival Oberhausen (1977) : International Jury Prize for El Khammès (The Sharecropper)
- Cabourg Film Festival (1977) : Special Jury Prize and Press Prize for El Khammès (The Sharecropper)
- Festival international du court métrage de Lille (1977) : Citation Award for El Khammès (The Sharecropper)
- ACCT (1979) : Great Prize (shot documentary) for El Khammès (The Sharecropper)
- Cannes Film Festival (1982) : Unesco Prize and Mention of the Ecumenical Jury for L'Ombre de la terre (Shadow of the Earth)
- Mannheim-Heidelberg International Filmfestival (1982) : Golden Doukat for L'Ombre de la terre (Shadow of the Earth)
- Taormina Film Fest (1982) : City Prize and Italian Critic Prize for L'Ombre de la terre (Shadow of the Earth)
- Moscow International Film Festival (1983) : Special Jury Prize for L'Ombre de la terre (Shadow of the Earth)
- Panafrican Film and Television Festival of Ouagadougou (1983) : Best Screenplay and Best Operator for L'Ombre de la terre (Shadow of the Earth)
- International Film Festival Vues d'Afrique (1985) : Grand Prize of Les Journées du cinéma africain de Montréal for L'Ombre de la terre (Shadow of the Earth)
- Panafrican Film and Television Festival of Ouagadougou (1991) : Best Sound Editing for Layla, ma raison (Layla, my reason)
- African, Asian and Latin American Film Festival of Milan (1991) : Audience Award for Layla, ma raison (Layla, my reason)
- Rencontres cinématographiques de Dakar (1994) : Golden Dak RECIDAK for Kër Jo Ouakam
- Bari International Film Festival (1998) : Grand Prize for Noces de lune (Wedding of the moon)
- MNET (1998) : Prix du meilleur décor pour Noces de lune (Wedding of the moon)
- International Film Festival Vues d'Afrique (1999) : Youth Mention at the African Film Festival
- Arab Film Festival Rotterdam (2004) : Special Jury Prize for La Danse du vent (Dance of the wind)
- African Film Festival in Khouribga (2004) : Prize of La Cinéphilie and Best Actor for La Danse du vent (Dance of the wind)
- Festival international du cinéma arabe de Gabès (2015) : Lifetime Achievement Award
- Écrans Noirs Festival (2015) : Charles Menzah Honor Prize for the Director's works
- Zagora Transsaharan Film Festival (2018) : Special Prize for his work
- Special Prize for his work at the 2018 Alexandria International Film Festival and the 2018 Annaba Mediterranean Film Festival
- Award of Honor for all of his work at the International Festival of Arab Cinema in Gabès 2018
- Tribute to his work at the Cinémathèque in Tunis 2018, at the Cinema La Clef Paris 2018 (by TV5 Monde Afrique, the International Organization of La Francophonie, the Guild of African Directors and Producers, Cinemawon, and CNCI Tunisia).
- Tribute for his work at Panafrican Film and Television Festival of Ouagadougou 2019 and at the Rencontres Cinématographiques de Dakar 2019.
