= Man of Ashes =

1986 film

- Film poster
- Directed by: Nouri Bouzid
- Written by: Nouri Bouzid
- Starring: Khadija Abaoub
- Cinematography: Youssef Ben Youssef
- Edited by: Mika Ben Miled
- Release date: 1986
- Running time: 109 minutes
- Country: Tunisia
- Language: Arabic

Man of Ashes (Arabic: ريح السد, translit. Rih essed) is a 1986 Tunisian drama film directed by Nouri Bouzid. It was screened in the Un Certain Regard section at the 1986 Cannes Film Festival.

== Cast ==
- Khadija Abaoub
- Sarra Abdelhadi
- Mustapha Adouani as Ameur
- Khaled Akrout
- Yacoub Bchiri as Levy
- Habib Belhadi
- Mahmoud Belhassen
- Noureddine Ben Ayed
- Souad Ben Sliman
- Fathia Chaabane
- Wassila Chaouki as Sejra
- Hamadi Dekhil
- Jamila Dhrif
- Mohamed Dhrif as Azaiez
- Habiba Gargouri
- Khaled Ksouri as Farfat
- Imed Maalal as Hachemi
- Sonia Mansour as Amina
- Lamine Nahdi
- Alham Nissar
- Mouna Noureddine as Nefissa
- Mongi Ouni
- Hedi Sanaa
- Chafia Trabelsi
