= The Magic Box (2002 film) =

2002 film

- Directed by: Ridha Behi
- Written by: Ridha Behi
- Starring: Marianne Basler
- Release date: 31 August 2002
- Running time: 94 minutes
- Country: Tunisia
- Languages: French; Arabic

The Magic Box (French: La boîte magique) is a 2002 Tunisian drama film directed by Ridha Behi and starring Marianne Basler. It was selected as the Tunisian entry for the Best Foreign Language Film at the 75th Academy Awards, but it was not nominated.

== Cast ==
- Marianne Basler as Lou
- Abdellatif Kechiche as Raouf as Adult
- Hichem Rostom as Mansour

== See also ==
- List of submissions to the 75th Academy Awards for Best Foreign Language Film
- List of Tunisian submissions for the Academy Award for Best Foreign Language Film
