= Stephanie Neuman =

American political scientist (1931–2020)

- Born: October 30, 1931; New York City, U.S.
- Died: April 15, 2020 (aged 88); New York City, U.S.
- Occupation: Professor
- Spouse: Herbert Neuman

Academic background
- Education: Connecticut College (BA); New York University (MA, PhD)

Stephanie Neuman (October 30, 1931 - April 15, 2020) was an American political scientist specializing in international relations, comparative foreign policy, the international arms trade and Third World security.

She was born on October 30, 1931, in New York City and died on April 15, 2020, in New York City. She taught at Columbia University in New York City.

== Life and work ==
Stephanie Neuman was the daughter of Charles Glicksberg, a professor of English literature at Brooklyn College and of Dorothy Glicksberg, a teacher. She attended the Walden School, then studied at Connecticut College where she received a BA and at New York University where she earned an MA and a PhD in political science. She taught International Relations at Douglass College at Rutgers University, at The New School For Social Research and Hunter College, then from 1980 to 2020 at Columbia University where she established the Defense Studies Institute within the School of International and Public Affairs SIPA. She was married to Herbert Neuman for sixty-six years and was the mother of journalist and film producer Elena Neuman Lefkowitz.

== Main publications ==
- Small states and segmented societies: National political integration in a global environment, Praeger special studies in international politics and government, 1976.ISBN 978-0275557300
- as editor: Arms transfers in the modern world, with Robert E. Harkavy (editor), Praeger, 1979. ISBN 978-0030453618
- Defense planning in less-industrialized states: The Middle East and South Asia, Lexington Books, 1984. ISBN 978-0669054682
- with Robert E. Harkavy: The Lessons of Recent Wars in the Third World, two volumes, Lexington Books, 1985, 1987.ISBN 978-0669067651
- Military Assistance in Recent Wars: The Dominance of the Superpowers (The Washington Papers), Praeger Security International, 1987.ISBN 978-0275922191
- as editor: International Relations Theory and the Third World, Palgrave. ISBN 978-0333731277
- with Robert E. Harkavy: Warfare and the Third World, Palgrave MacMillan, 2001.ISBN 978-0312240097
- with Robert E. Harvaky: The Lessons of Recent Wars in the Third World, two volumes, Lexington Books, 1985, 1987. ISBN 978-0669067651; ISBN 978-0669098525
- "International Stratification and Third World Military Industries," in International Organization, (Winter 1984), pp. 167–97.
- “Arms, Aid and the Superpowers,” in: Foreign Affairs, Summer 1988
- « Le contrôle des transferts d’armes : utopie ou réalité ? » Cultures et Conflits, No. 4, Réseaux Internationaux de violence vente d’armes et terrorisme (Hiver 1991-1992), pp. 93–111.
- "Power, Influence and Hierarchy: Defence Industries in a unipolar World" in: Defence and Peace Economics, 19 April 2010, pp. 105–134.
- C-SPAN, with Rabbi Arnold Resnicoff: Religious faith and military service, January 24, 2006, Video:

== See also ==
- Edward J. Laurance
- Michael Klare
