= Alfonso Gumucio Reyes =

Bolivian politician

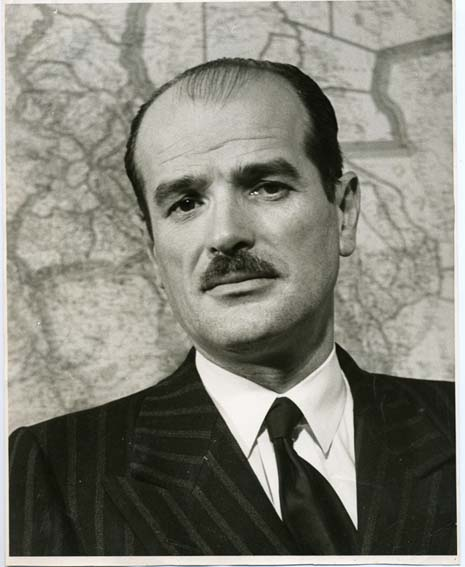
- Alfonso Gumucio Reyes in his office, La Paz 1953
- Born: August 3, 1914; Cochabamba, Bolivia
- Died: October 17, 1981 (aged 67); La Paz, Bolivia
- Occupations: President of CBF, Minister of Economy, Ambassador to Uruguay, Ambassador to Spain

Alfonso Gumucio Reyes (Bolivia, 1914) was a political leader of the Movimiento Nacionalista Revolucionario (MNR) and one of its founding members in 1940. After the triumph of the Revolution of April 9, 1952, Gumucio Reyes became the President of the Corporación Boliviana de Fomento (CBF), the State institution in charge of economic development and infrastructure. As such he was responsible for several development projects, such as the Planta Industralizadora de Leche (PIL) in Cochabamba; the Ingenio Guabirá, a sugar mill in Santa Cruz; and the main roads from the highlands to the eastern part of the country, the lower lands.

From 1957 to 1960 he was appointed Ambassador to Uruguay, by President of Bolivia Hernán Siles Zuazo. From 1960 to 1964 he became Minister of Economy under the government of President Víctor Paz Estenssoro, and was responsible for the economic development of the country.

In 1964, when he had recently travelled to Spain as Bolivian Ambassador, a military coup took place in Bolivia, led by General René Barrientos. Gumucio Reyes stayed in exile in Madrid until 1967. When he came back to Bolivia, he was imprisoned by the military regime for three months.
