= Cristián Parker Gumucio =

Chilean sociologist (born 1953)

Cristián Parker Gumucio (born 1953) is a Chilean sociologist, a specialist in the sociology of religion in Latin America. He holds a Ph D. in Sociology from the Université catholique de Louvain and a degree in Sociology (Universidad Católica de Chile). He is currently an associate professor at the University of Santiago, Chile, where he is a researcher at the Institute for Advanced Studies (Instituto de Estudios Avanzados), Director of the Master's program in Social Sciences with major in Civil Society Studies, and vice-chancellor of postgraduate studies. One of his major works, Popular Religion and Capitalist Modernization in Latin America (Orbis), has been published in several editions, including translations into English and Portuguese.

== Academic career ==
Parker attended Universidad Católica de Chile, where he took his initial degree, and Université Catholique de Louvain, where he took his doctorate. He has been Director of the School of Sociology, Dean of Social Science (1989–1995) at the Universidad Academia de Humanismo Cristiano, following which he was Vice-president of Research and Development (2002–2003) and Director of the Institute for Advanced Studies of the University of Santiago (2005–2010). He is currently associate professor at the University of Santiago.

He has been a consultant for UNICEF, UNDP, ECLAC, FLACSO-Ecuador, and various public agencies in Chile, among them ministries of Education, of Development and Justice. In addition he has lectured in Research Methodology in the Academia Diplomática de Chile (2004–2012) and the Master's program in Military History and Strategic Thought of the War Academy of the Chilean Army (2004–2015).

He has written or co-written 23 books, 91 book chapters, and many journal articles. He has directed courses at about 30 universities in Chile and elsewhere.

== Contributions to sociology ==
=== Sociology of religion ===
During his academic career Parker has contributed to the sociology of religion and culture, publishing various works in this field of knowledge. Parker's work is consulted by specialists and those interested in Latin America's sociocultural and religious evolution. His work has become known internationally, especially his analysis of Latin American culture and religion. His 1993 book Otra Lógica en América Latina has been described as "a classic study of Latin American popular religion".

His contribution to the sociology of religion, underscoring its cultural character, rich in creativity, has contributed to the reevaluation of lived religion, i.e., to the noninstitutional character of religion. His criticisms of the ecclesiocentric bias of the sociology of western religion have been discussed in relevant publications. According to the Italian sociologist Roberto Cipriani, Parker's work analyzes with scientific rigor the relations and intersections between popular and official religion. It enables a complete knowledge of popular culture with an empathic and participative approach on the “culture of the poor”, revealing what Parker calls the "alternative logic" of popular culture. Parker also provides an extensive analysis of the relation between religion and politics from a democratic perspective. His thesis, however, has come under criticism from writers including Pedro Morandé and Jorge Larraín.

=== Development studies ===
Professor Parker has contributed to the sociology of development, especially in his analysis of new ways of understanding the relation between culture and development. In particular, he has conducted research on the social representations of social actors challenged by the radical scientific and technological innovations in the context of unequal globalization and on the environmental crisis, climate change, and energy transition in South American societies.

== Role in the Chilean transition to democracy ==
During the dictatorship of General Augusto Pinochet, Parker supported ecumenical initiatives for human rights and a restoration of democracy in Chile. He was president of the Association of Catholic Students (1974–1976), and as executive secretary of the Lay Department of the Chilean Episcopal Conference (1977–1981) he worked with bishops including Cardenal Raúl Silva Henríquez, Bernardino Piñera, Fernando Ariztía and Enrique Alvear. While in Europe studying at Louvain (1982–1985), he took part in political activities seeking socialist reconstruction and involvement of the churches with Chilean exiles overseas. On returning to Chile he engaged again with the defense of human rights, and assisted church grassroots communities in their struggles under the inspiration of Liberation Theology.

After the return to democracy from 1988 he turned to teaching and academic work. His initial focus was on civic and political participation of youth, in addition to ethical issues, democracy and human development. He later brought out a collection of studies and evaluative research relating to public policy on development among indigenous communities, alleviation of poverty, promotion of youth culture, development of science and technology, and policy on climate change and sustainable energy.

He co-founded the Universidad Academia de Humanismo Cristiano in 1989, which became part of the University of Santiago in 1996,

== Works ==
The writings of Prof. Parker are published in many books, book chapters, and academic papers.

=== Books (author and coauthor) ===
2012 Religión, Política y Cultura en América Latina: Nuevas Miradas. Instituto de Estudios Avanzados (Editor), Santiago: ACSRM- IDEA. 390 p. ISBN 9789563031454

2010 Parker, C., Estenssoro, F. (Co-ed), El Desafío del Conocimiento para América Latina. Santiago: Explora CONICYT-USACH. 411 p. ISBN 9789568416225

2002 La pobreza desde la perspectiva del desarrollo humano: desafío para las políticas públicas en América Latina. Tegucigalpa, Honduras: PNUD. 25 p. ISBN 999266567X

2000 Los jóvenes chilenos, cambios culturales; perspectivas para el siglo XXI, Santiago: MIDEPLAN. 197 p. ISBN 9567463719

1998 Ética, Democracia y Desarrollo Humano, (Editor), Santiago: LOM Ediciones, CERC-UAHC. 385 p. ISBN 9562821056

1998 Ética, Cultura y Desarrollo: Alternativa para el siglo XXI, Tegucigalpa, Honduras: Subirana. 127 p.

1997 Religión y Postmodernidad, Lima: Kairos. 120 p.

1996 Otra Lógica en América latina, Religión popular y modernización capitalista, México and Santiago: Fondo de Cultura Económica. 407 p. ISBN 9567083088

1996 Popular Religion and Modernization in Latin America, New York: Orbis Books, Maryknoll, 251 p.

1996 Religiäo Popular e Modernizaçao capitalista, Petrópolis, Rio de Janeiro: Vozes. 349 p.

1992 Parker, C., Aman, K. (Co-ed.), Popular Culture in Chile, Boulder, San Francisco: Westview Press. 225 p.

1992 Parker, C., Salvat, P. (Co-ed.), Formación cívica y política de la juventud, Santiago: Ediciones Ornitorrinco. 163 p.

=== Noteworthy scientific papers ===
2015 “" Religion et transition énergétique: une étude en Amérique du Sud" Social Compass, Vol, 62, N°3, September, pp. 344–361. (See paper on line) http://scp.sagepub.com/content/62/3/344.short

2015 “Agua-energía-minería, consumo sustentable y gobernanza: visión de actores estratégicos sudamericanos”. En B. Hogenboom, M Baud, F de Castro, (editores) Gobernanza Ambiental en América Latina, Clacso - Engov: Buenos Aires (see paper on line)

2013 “Elites, Climate Change and Agency in a Developing Society: the Chilean Case”, Environment, Development and Sustainability, Vol 15, Nº5, pp. 1337–1363. ISI (See paper on line)

2008, “Mentalidad religiosa post-ilustrada: creencias y esoterismo en una sociedad en mutuación cultural”, en Aurelio Alonso (ed) América Latina y el Caribe. Territorios religiosos y desafíos para el diálogo, Buenos Aires, CLACSO, Consejo Latinoamericano de Ciencias Sociales (See paper on line)

2008, “Interculturality, Conflicts and Religion: Theoretical Perspectivas”, Social Compass, Vol. 55, No. 3, pp. 316–329. (See paper on line)

2006, “Magico-popular religion' in contemporary society: towards a post-western sociology of religión”, en James A. Beckford, and John Walliss (eds.) Theorising Religion Classical and Contemporary Debates, Hampshire (UK)/Burlington (USA), Ashgate, pp. 60–74.

2002,“Religion and the Awakening of Indigenous People in Latin America", Social Compass, Vol.1, Nº 49, pp. 67–81. (See paper on line)

1998, “Modern Popular Religión, A Complex Object of Study for Sociology”, International Sociology, Vol. 13, No. 2, 195-212. (See paper on line)

== Notes and references ==
=== References ===
- Cristián Parker’s official web page
- Profile in Instituto de Estudios Avanzados
- CNN (Spanish) interview about the Church
- Popular Religión in Chile. Interview in La Tercera newspaper
- Environmental Governance and Sustainable Development Conference, ECLAC (2015).
- Interview to C. Parker by CLACSO TV about Environmental Governance in Latin America (Spanish)
- “Ética, Democracia y Corrupción”. Spanish column in El Mostrador news Journal
- "América Latina: menos católica, no menos creyente". Deutsche Welle. June 26, 2014. About religion in Latin America. Interview by the Deutsche Welle (Spanish).
- Interview with CNN – Chile about Sects.
