= The Silences of the Palace =

- Theatrical release poster
- Directed by: Moufida Tlatli
- Written by: Moufida Tlatli
- Produced by: Canal Horizon; Cinétéléfilms; Mat Films
- Starring: Amel Hedhili; Hend Sabri; Najia Ouerghi; Sami Bouajila; Kamel Fazaa; Fatima Ben Saïdane; Kamel Touati
- Edited by: Moufida Tlatli
- Music by: Anouar Brahem
- Distributed by: Amorces Diffusion; Capitol Entertainment
- Release dates: 7 September 1994 (France); 4 September 1994 (Canada); 30 September 1994 (U.S.)
- Running time: 128 minutes
- Country: Tunisia
- Languages: Arabic; French

The Silences of the Palace (Arabic: صمت القصور, romanized: ṣamt al-quṣūr) is a 1994 Tunisian film co-written and directed by Moufida Tlatli. The film investigates issues of gender, class and sexuality in the Arab world through the lives of two generations of women at a prince's palace. Seen through the eyes of an attractive young wedding singer, it exposes the sexual and social servitude of a group of women in an elaborate palace during the French Protectorate in Tunisia. Tlatli wrote the film in response to her own mother's sudden severe illness and her subsequent realization of how little she knew about her life.

== Plot ==
Set in 1950s Tunisia, the film is about a 25-year-old woman, Alia, who returns to her place of birth—a prince's palace in which her mother, Khedija, worked as a house servant and mistress. Alia had fled the palace ten years earlier, at which time she spent burying tortured memories of her childhood. In her visit to pay respects for the death of the prince, Alia wanders through the largely abandoned palace where she is confronted by these memories represented as detailed flashbacks of her childhood. She begins to piece together a narrative about her mother's sexuality and sexual exploitation in a space ordered by gender and class difference, and is re-awakened to her persistent questioning about her father's identity. As Alia negotiates her past, she also deals with her current relationship to her lover, Lotfi, who has asked her to have what seems to be yet another abortion. Her development throughout the film contrasts her awakening to a past of sexual and social servitude which many of the female servants experienced in the palace against her own contested independence fraught with pain, conflict and uncertainty.

== Critical reception ==
The film received positive attention at the New York Film Festival in 1994; New York Times critic Caryn James describes the film as a "universal coming-of-age story with a feminist twist." After wider release in 1996, the Los Angeles Times drew attention to Tlati's depiction of feminist issues in Tunisia and praised her "flowing, sensual style", calling the film "brutal" and "tender". Paul Sedra's 2011 article describes the continued relevance of Silences of the Palace in Arabic studies.

== Accolades ==
=== Awards ===
- Toronto International Film Festival's "International Critics' Award" for 1994
- Cannes Film Festival Golden Camera award for 1994
- Sutherland Trophy award from the British Film Institute Awards for 1995
- Golden Tanit of Carthage Film Festival for 1994
- Golden Tulip award from Istanbul International Film Festival for 1995

=== Listicles ===
- First on Aswan International Women's Film Festival's Best films for women in Arab cinema
