= Institut des hautes études cinématographiques =

Former film school in Paris, France

The Institut des hautes études cinématographiques (IDHEC; "Institute for Advanced Cinematographic Studies") is a French film school, founded during World War II under the leadership of Marcel L'Herbier who was its president from 1944 to 1969. IDHEC offered training for directors and producers, camera operators, sound technicians, editors, art directors and costume designers. It became highly influential, and many prominent film-makers received their training there including Paulo Rocha, Louis Malle, Alain Resnais, Jean-Louis Trintignant, Claire Denis, Peter Lilienthal, Volker Schlöndorff, Andrzej Żuławski, René Vautier, Andre Weinfeld, Mostafa Derkaoui, Jean-Jacques Annaud, Claude Sautet, Nelson Pereira dos Santos, Patrice Leconte, Costa Gavras, Theo Angelopoulos, Jesús Franco, Omar Amiralay, Rithy Panh, Arnaud Desplechin, Claude Miller, Alfonso Gumucio Dagron Christopher Miles and Pascale Ferran.

It was reorganized between 1986 and 1988 and renamed La Fémis.
