= 2024 Red Sea International Film Festival =

Film festival in Jeddah, Saudi Arabia

Red Sea International Film Festival مهرجان البحر الأحمر السينمائي الدولي
- Location: Jeddah, Saudi Arabia
- Founded: 2019
- Hosted by: Red Sea Film Festival Foundation
- Festival date: 5 December 2022–14 December 2022
- Language: Arabic; English
- Website: RSFF

Red Sea International Film Festival
- 2025 2023

The 2024 Red Sea International Film Festival took place from December 5 to 14, 2024, in Jeddah, Saudi Arabia, and marked the fourth edition of the film festival. It was held in the newly built Cultural Square venue in the Al-Balad district of Jeddah.

The Red Sea jury was headed by Spike Lee; over 120 films from 81 countries were featured for the film festival's lineup, and 16 films were selected for competition. A new short film competition, sponsored by TikTok, was added to the lineup.

In addition to screening films for competition, the film festival also hosted talks and discussions, galas and parties, and other events for the industry.

== Jury ==
=== Features ===
- Spike Lee
- Abu Bakr Shawky
- Minnie Driver
- Tuba Büyüküstün
- Daniel Dae Kim

=== Shorts ===
- Wu Ke-xi
- Ramata-Toulaye Sy
- Hamzah Jamjoom

== Official selection ==
The festival lineup was announced on November 11, 2024.

=== Red Sea International Film Festival: In Competition ===
Title	Director(s)	Production country
Superboys of Malegaon	Reema Kagti	
Hanami	Denise Fernandes	
To a Land Unknown	Mahdi Fleifel	
Moon	Kurdwin Ayub	
Red Path	Lotfi Achour	
Snow White	Taghrid Abouelhassen	
Bin U Bin, Border Elsewhere	Mohamed Lakhdar Tati	
Saify	Wael Abumansour	
Aïcha	Mehdi Barsaoui	
Seeking Haven for Mr. Rambo	Khaled Mansour	
Sima's Song	Roya Sadat	
6 in the Morning	Mehran Modiri	
To Kill a Mongolian Horse	Jiang Xiaoxuan	
Saba	Maksud Hossain	

=== Red Sea International Film Festival: Arab Spectacular ===
Title	Director(s)	Production country
40 Acres	R. T. Thorne	Canada
A Sudden Case of Christmas	Peter Chelsom	Italy
Better Man	Michael Gracey	United Kingdom, United States, Australia
K-Pops!	Anderson .Paak	United States
Kraven the Hunter	J. C. Chandor	United States
Maria	Pablo Larraín	Italy, Germany, United States
Modì, Three Days on the Wing of Madness	Johnny Depp	United Kingdom, Italy, Hungary
Monsieur Aznavour	Mehdi Idir, Fabien Marsaud	France
My Way	Thierry Teston, Lisa Azuelos	France, United Kingdom
Naples to New York	Gabriele Salvatores	Italy
Ravens	Mark Gill	France, Japan, Spain, Belgium
State of Silence	Santiago Maza	Mexico
We Live in Time	John Crowley	France, United Kingdom

=== Special Screenings ===
Title	Director(s)	Production country
Abdo & Saneya	Omar Bakry	
Front Row	Merzak Allouache	
Hobal	Abdulaziz Alshlahei	
Lail Nahar	Abdulaziz Almuzaini	
My Driver and I	Ahd Kamel	

=== Families & Children ===
Title	Director(s)	Production country
Night of the Zoopocalypse	Richard Curtis, Rodrigo Perez-Castro	
Panda Bear in Africa	Richard Claus, Karsten Kiilerich	
Sukkar: Sabaabaa W Houboub Al Kharziz	Tamer Mahdy	

=== New Vision ===
Title	Director(s)	Production country
Alroshan	Mohammed Ous	
Kemokazi	Abdulrahman Batawie	
Othman in the Vatican	Yasir Bin Ghanem	
When the Light Shines	Ryan Al Bishri	
Yalla Parkour	Areeb Zuaiter	

=== Series ===
Title	Director(s)	Production country
Ghost Train	Tak Se-Woong	
Lost Worlds With Bettany Hughes: The Nabataeans	Jim Greayer	
Tales on Banks of the Bosphorus	Zeina Sfeir	
Zorro	Jean Baptiste Saurel	

=== Short Competition—Arab Selection ===
Title	Director(s)	Production country
Fragments of Life	Anis Ben Dali	
Saint Rose	Zayn Alexandre	
The Signal	Nasser Alqattan	
Shams	Adam Rayan	
Chikha	Ayoub Layoussifi, Zahoua Raji	
African Family Dinner	Ibrahim Mursal	
In Three Layers of Darkness	Houcem Slouli	
Children of Barzagh	Ahmed Khattab	
Mera, Mera, Mera	Khaled Zidan	
Malika	Maram Taibah	
Land of God	Imad Benomar	
Nemshi?	Assaf Al Rousan	
Fizr	Rani Nasr	
Zahra	Hadi Shatat	
One Last Time	Karim Rahbani	

=== Short Competition—International Selection ===
Title	Director(s)	Production country
Across the Water	Viv Li	
Alazar	Beza Hailu Lemma	
Hatch	Alireza Kazemipour, Panta Mosleh	
Lai Lei	Binglin Cui	
Lunge	Negar Hassanzadeh	
Nails	Triparna Banerjee	
Never Have I Ever	Joyce A. Nashawati	
Pie Dan Lo	Kim Yip Tong	
Radikals	Arvin Belarmino	
Sanki Yoxsan	Azer Guliev	
Urefu We Kamba	Mageto Ndege	
Washhhh	Mickey Lai	

=== New Saudi, New Cinema Selection ===
Title	Director(s)	Production country
A Mosquito	Raneem Almohandes, Dana Almohandes	
The Post	Zakaria Albashir	
Underground	Abdulrahman Sandokji	
Pavlov's Bells	Khalid Fahad	
Khamsen	Abdullah Alrowis	
Two Sisters	Waleed Alqahtani	
Tied	Yam Fida	
Where's the Imam?	Abrar Qari	
When the Shelves Hymn	Hanaa Saleh Alfassi	
Aseer Memory	Saad Tahaitah	
Diaa Shamsi	Lama Jarkas	
Sugar	Khalid Bin Waleed	

== Awards ==
Award	Winner
Golden Yusr Award—Best Feature Film	Red Path, dir. Lotfi Achour
Silver Yusr Award—Best Feature Film	To a Land Unknown, dir. Mahdi Fleifel
Film AlUla Audience Award—Best Film	Little Jaffna, dir. Lawrence Valin
Film AlUla Audience Award—Best Saudi Film	Hobal, dir. Abdulaziz Alshlahei
Best Documentary	State of Silence, dir. Santiago Maza
Chopard Rising Talent Trophy	Roula Dakheelallah for My Driver & I
Cinematic Achievement	To Kill a Mongolian Horse, dir. Jiang Xiaoxuan
Best Actor	Mahmoud Bakri for To a Land Unknown
Best Actress	Mariam Sherif for Snow White
Best Screenplay	Songs of Adam, written by Oday Rasheed
Best Director	Lotfi Achour for Red Path
Jury Prize	Seeking Haven for Mr. Rambo, dir. Khaled Mansour
Golden Yusr—Best Short Film	Hatch, dir. Alireza Kazemipour, Panta Mosleh
Silver Yusr—Best Short Film	Alazar, dir. Beza Hailu Lemma
Short Special Mention	Children of Barzagh, dir. Ahmed Khattab
48Hr Film Challenge	All in One Night, dir. Thoraya Akram
48Hr Film Challenge	Afen, dir. Nawaf Alkinani, Othman Al Khowiter
Red Sea Honorees	Aamir Khan
Red Sea Honorees	Viola Davis
Red Sea Honorees	Emily Blunt
Red Sea Honorees	Mona Zaki
