= Raouf Ben Amor =

Tunisian actor

- رؤوف بن عمر
- Born: 24 December 1947 (age 78); Tunisia
- Education: Sadiki College
- Occupation: Actor

Raouf Ben Amor (Arabic: رؤوف بن عمر) (born 24 December 1947 ) is a Tunisian actor.

== Filmography ==
=== Theater ===
- 1972 : Goha et l'Est embrouillé by Hamadi Ben Othman
- 1977 : Les Héritiers
- 1978 : Le Mariage et l'enquête
- 2004 : Les Paroles de la nuit by Taoufik Jebali
- 2008 : Le Journal d'un dinosaure by Taoufik Jebali and Rached Mannai
- Borni & Atraa by Mohamed Raja Farhat, Fadhel Jaïbi and Fadhel Jaziri
- Mohamed Ali Hammi by Mohamed Raja Farhat and Fadhel Jaïbi
- Jazia by Tahar Guiga, Samir Ayadi and Abdel Rahmane al-Abnoudi
- Ismaïl Pacha by Taoufik Jebali and Mohamed Driss

==== Cinema ====
- 1971 : And tomorrow... ? by Brahim Babaï
- 1975 : The Messiah (Il Messia) by Roberto Rossellini : Judas
- 1980 : C'est pas moi, c'est lui by Pierre Richard : the rebel leader
- 1980 : Aziza by Abdellatif Ben Ammar : Ali
- 1986 : Pirates by Roman Polanski : the merry-go-round keeper
- 1988 : Frantic by Roman Polanski : Doctor Metlaoui
- 1989 : La Barbare by Mireille Darc
- 1990 : Halfaouine Child of the Terraces by Férid Boughedir
- 1990 : Mort subite produced by Rai 2
- 1991 : Sand Screens by Randa Chahal Sabag : the leader of the henchmen
- 1992 : Deceptions by L.J. Munkler : the actor
- 1993 : La Guerre du Golfe... et après ? by Nouri Bouzid
- 1995 : La Danse du feu by Selma Baccar
- 1997 : Le Policier de Tanger (Tangier Cop) by Stephen Whittaker produced by Channel 4
- 1997 : Bent Familia by Nouri Bouzid : Majid
- 2005 : Fleur d'oubli by Selma Baccar
- 2005 : Junun by Fadhel Jaïbi
- 2009 : Cinecittà by Ibrahim Letaïef
- 2010 : Baydha (Tabou) by Meriem Riveill (short film)
- 2011 : Black Gold by Jean-Jacques Annaud : His Majesty's Theologian
- 2016 : Khousouf by Fadhel Jaziri
- 2017 : Of Skin and Men by Mehdi Ben Attia : Taïeb
- 2017 : El Jaida by Selma Baccar
- 2017 : Tunis by Night by Elyes Baccar : Youssef Ben Younes

==== Television ====
- 1981 : Arme au bleu by Maurice Frydland (tv movie) : El Kakdar
- 1989 : Les Gens : Radhi
- 1990 : Quelle histoire by Hamadi Arafa (series)
- 1992 : Confession de la dernière pluie (series)
- 1994 : Warda (series)
- 1995 : The Vacillations of Poppy Carew by James Cellan Jones (tv movie) : Mustafa
- 1995–1996 : El Khottab Al Bab (Suitors are on the door) by Slaheddine Essid and Moncef Baldi : Si Chedly
- 2008 : Sayd Errim by Ali Mansour (series)
- 2008 : Villa Jasmin by Ferid Boughedir (tv movie) : Ben Romdane dad
- 2009 : Aqfas Bila Touyour by Ezzeddine Harbaoui (series)
- 2013 : Layem by Khaled Barsaoui (series)
- 2013 : Awled Lebled by Selim Benhafsa (series pilot)
- 2014–2015 : Naouret El Hawa by Madih Belaid : Raouf Berhouma
- 2016 : Warda w Kteb by Ahmed Rjeb (series) : the writer Borhen Ben Othman
- 2017 : Flashback by Mourad Ben Cheikh (series, season 2)
- 2017 : Nsibti Laaziza by Slaheddine Essid and Younes Ferhi (series, guest of honor in episode 2 of season 7) : Adnen Boumiza (Painter) (series, season 7)
- 2018 : Tej El Hadhra by Sami Fehri
- 2019 : El Maestro by Lassaad Oueslati
- 2020 : 27 by Yosri Bouassida
- 2020 : Galb El Dhib by Bassem Hamraoui
- 2021 : El Foundou by Saoussen Jemni : Mokhtar, yahia's father
- 2021 : Machair (season 2) by Muhammet Gök : the minister (guest of honor of the last episode)

==== Emissions ====
- 2020 : 90 minutes by Hedi Zaiem : season 3 episode 2 guest
- 2020 : Des/Confinés by Maya Ksouri : episode 28 guest
- 2020 : Carthage Stories : episode 1 guest
- 2021 : Labes by Naoufel Ouertani : episode 8 guest (part 4)

==== Videos ====
- 2013 : advertising spot for El Hiwar El Tounsi
- 2014 : advertising spot for Tunisie Telecom
- 2014 : Marat by Ali Louati and Anouar Brahem
- 2017 : appearance in the clip Yamma Lasmer Douni by Asma Othmani, realized by Zied Litayem
- 2019 : Netfakker by Anouar Brahem
