= Samia Rhaiem =

Tunisian actress

- سامية رحيم
- Born: June 11, 1955 (age 70); Tunis
- Occupation: Actress
- Years active: 1995–present

Samia Rhaiem (Arabic: سامية رحيم) is a Tunisian actress.

== Filmography ==
=== Cinema ===
==== Feature films ====
- 1995 : La Danse du feu by Selma Baccar
- 1998 : Ghodoua Nahrek by Mohamed Ben Smaïl
- 2002 : La Boîte magique by Ridha Behi
- 2004 : La Villa by Mohamed Damak
- 2005 : Khochkhach (La Fleur d'oublie) by Selma Baccar
- 2010 : The String by Mehdi Ben Attia : Raja
- 2015 : Horra by Moez Kamoun
- 2017 : Of Skin and Men by Mehdi Ben Attia
- 2017 : El Jaida by Selma Baccar

==== Short films ====
- 1998 : Le Festin by Mohamed Damak
- 1999 : April by Raja Amari
- 2012 : Case départ by Karim Belhadj
- 2012 : Bousculade du 9 avril 1938 by Tarak Khalladi and Sawssen Saya

=== Television ===
- 1996 - 1997 : El Khottab Al Bab (Suitors are on the door) by Slaheddine Essid : Safiya Tehifa
- 2001 : Dhafayer by Habib Mselmani
- 2002 : Gamret Sidi Mahrous by Slaheddine Essid : Marcelle Pascalini-Souilah
- 2005 : Chaâbane fi Ramadhane by Selma Baccar
- 2007 : Kamanjet Sallema by Hamadi Arafa : Akila Abdelmaksoud
- 2008 - 2009 : Maktoub (saisons 1-2) by Sami Fehri : Camilia Abd El Hak
- 2009 - 2010 : Njoum Ellil (seasons 1-2) by Madih Belaïd
- 2013 : Layem by Khaled Barsaoui
- 2014 : Talaa Wala Habet by Majdi Smiri : Lilia
- 2015 : Naouret El Hawa (saison 2) by Madih Belaïd : Beya Ben Abdallah
- 2017 - 2018 : Jnoun El Qayla by Amine Chiboub : Fatma
- 2018 : Tej El Hadhra by Sami Fehri : Lella Aicha
- 2019 - 2021 : Machair by Muhammet Gök : Mère and Taher Yahia
- 2020 : Ken Ya Makenech (saison 1) by Abdelhamid Bouchnak : Cendrillon
- 2021 : El Foundou by Saoussen Jemni : Lella Mannena
