= Anissa Daoud =

Franco-Tunisian actress, author, and producer

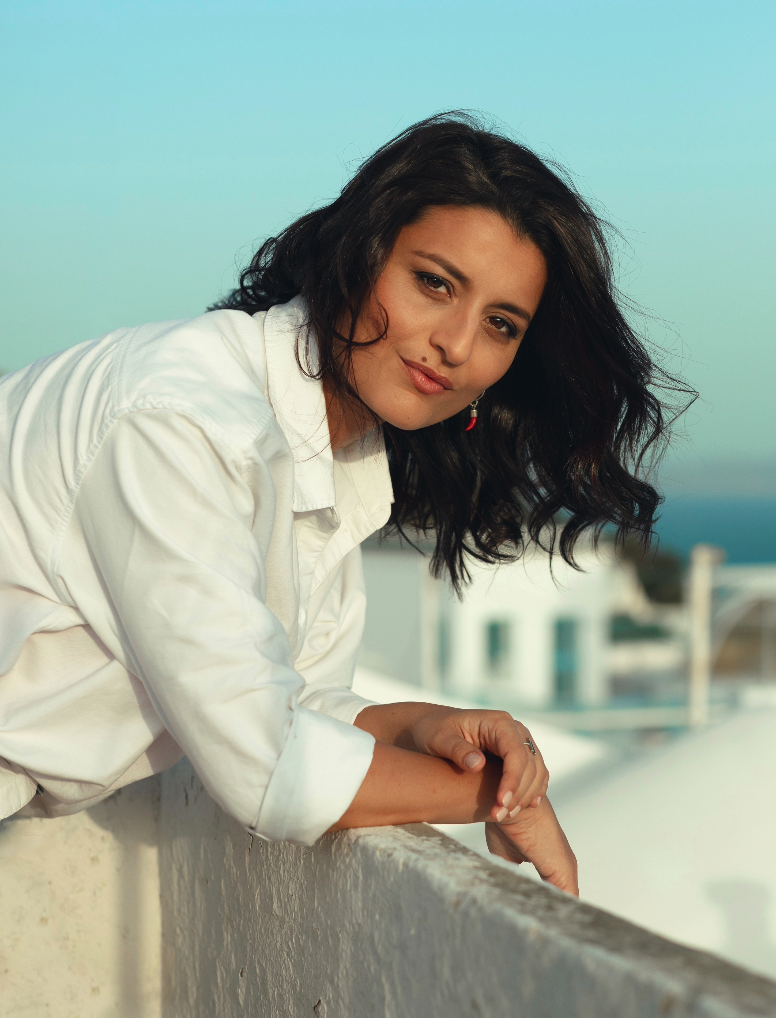
- Born: Dougga
- Citizenship: France, Tunisia
- Occupations: Actor, Film director, Film producer, Film actor, Stage actor, Screenwriter

Anissa Daoud (Arabic: أنيسة داود) is a Franco-Tunisian actress, author and producer. Living between Paris and Tunis, she is part of the art collective Artists Producers Associates (APA).

== Career ==
Anissa Daoud grew up in Tunisia, of Tunisian parents. Self-taught, her acting career started in cinema with leading roles in She and He (Elle et Lui) by Elyes Baccar, Thalathun by Fadhel Jaziri, The Long Night by Syrian director Hatem Ali or La Tendresse Du Loup by Jilani Saadi, for which she has received many awards. At the Theatre, she took part, as an actress and staging assistant, in the productions of director Mohamed Guellati in France, Africa or Palestine (the Freedom Theatre in Jenin) for several years. She also worked under the direction of Franco-Comoran choreographer fr:Karry Kamal Karry. In 2010, she got back to her Italian roots in Naples interpreting, in Italian, the role of Juliet in Romeo and Juliet directed by Alexander Zeldin for the Napoli Teatro Festival. Since 2009, Anissa has joined director Lotfi Achour as co-playwright and actress on the musical and theatrical shows Hobb Story, Sex in The Arab City and Macbeth: Leila and Ben has Bloody History, created for the 2012 London Olympics. Together they founded the APA : Artists Producers Associated, and through it, she has been producing various shows and movies, some of which were in official competitions at top festivals such as Clermont-Ferrand, Dubai, Cannes or the Venice Film Festival. More recently she has played the female lead role in Jeunesse Tunsienne- Tunisian Spring by Raja Amari and produced by Arte, winning the Best Actress Award in Durban International Film Festival – South Africa, and in Les Frontières du Ciel by Fares Naanaa for which she has also received the Best Actress award at the Rencontre des Réalisateurs Tunisiens.

In 2016 she is one of main characters, the co-writer and co-producer of the first feature of Lotfi Achour "Demain dès l'Aube".

== Filmography ==
=== Actress ===
==== Feature films ====
- 2004 : She and Him by Elyes Baccar : She
- 2004 : Summer Wedding by Mokhtar Ladjimi : The bride
- 2006 : Tenderness of the Wolf by Jilani Saadi
- 2008 : Thalathoun (Around thirty) by Fadhel Jaziri
- 2009 : The Long Night by Hatem Ali
- 2014 : Tunisian Spring by Raja Amari
- 2015 : Les Frontières du ciel (The Borders of the Sky) by Fares Naanaa
- 2016 : Demain dès l'aube de Lotfi Achour
- 2016 : Tomorrow at dawn by Lotfi Achour : Zeïneb
- 2017 : Beauty and the Pack by Kaouther Ben Hania : Faïza

==== Short movies ====
- 1999 : Tunis... fille du siècle (Tunis... daughter of the century) of Taïeb Jellouli
- 2010 : The Album by Shiraz Fradi
- 2010 : Tightening by Najwa Slama Limam
- 2014 : Let me finish by Doria Achour : Sonia
- 2014 : Father of Lotfi Achour : Sonia
- 2016 : The Rest is the work of man by Doria Achour

==== Television ====
- 2002 : Divorce caprice (Talak Incha) by Moncef Dhouib : Fiancée of Chadi (Guest of honor)
- 2008 : Toi-même tu sais (You Know Yourself) by John Gabriel Biggs
- 2008 : Villa Jasmin by Ferid Boughedir

==== Documentaries ====
- 2008 : Hé ! N'oublie pas le cumin (Hey! Don't forget the cumin) by Hala Abdullah Jacob
- 2013 : Artistes en Tunisie (Artists in Tunisia) by Serge Moati
- 2014 : 7 vies (7 lives) by Lilia Blaise and Amine Boufaie

=== Director ===
- 2016: Our woman in politics and in society (documentary)
- 2018: Best Day Ever (short film fiction, premiere at the Directors' Fortnight)
- 2020: Le Bain (short film from fiction)

=== Theater ===
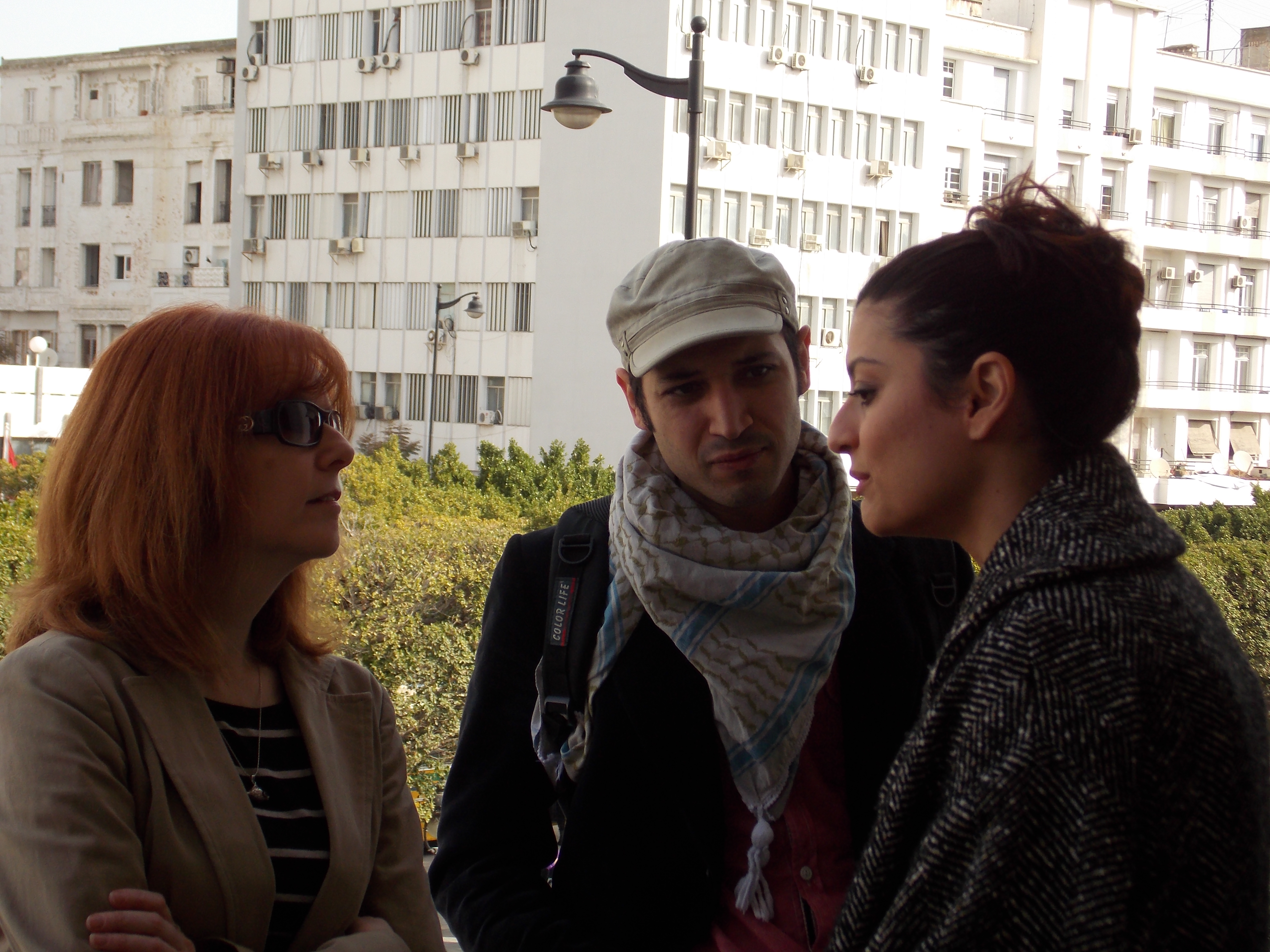
De droite à gauche : Anissa Daoud, Jawhar Basti et une représentante de la Royal Shakespeare Company She regularly collaborates in the work of a French theater company, La Grave and Burlesque equipped by Cyclist. * Among her plays are You have such pretty sheeps, why don't you talk about the sheeps?

, a poetic, political and burlesque show about relationships colonial and neocolonial, and a creation on Palestine, entitled Nakba, while walking I saw.

In 2013, she signed with Jawhar Basti and Lotfi Achour the adaptation of the play by William Shakespeare, Macbeth, in the context of post-revolution Tunisia. Their adaptation, called Macbeth : Leila and Ben – A Bloody History, was created in London for the Cultural Olympiad 2012 (en) and World Shakespeare Festival.

- War footing directed by Mohamed Guellati
- Little flower directed by Mohamed Guellati
- Rahmen : choreography by Karry Kamal Karry and directed by Elyes Baccar
- There's more good! directed by Mohamed Guellati
- You have such pretty sheep, why don't you talk about sheep? : text and direction by Mohamed Guellati
- Nakba, while walking I saw: directed by Mohamed Guellati
- Hobb Story – Sex in the (Arab) city : directed by Lotfi Achour (actress and co-playwright with Achour)
- Romeo and Juliet by William Shakespeare : directed by Alexander Zeldin
- Leila and Ben – A Bloody History : directed by Lotfi Achour (actress and co-playwright with Achour and Basti)
- I am still alive : directed by Jacques Allaire

== Distinctions ==
- Award for Best Actress at the Tarifa African Cinema Festival for Tenderness of the Wolf
- Award for Best Actress at the Alexandria International Film Festival for Tenderness of the Wolf
- Award for Best Actress at the Muscat International Film Festival for Tenderness of the Wolf
- Best Actress Award at the Durban International Film Festival for Tunisian Spring
- Prize for female interpretation at the Meeting of Tunisian directors for Les Frontières du ciel (The sky borders)
- Haydée-Samama Chikli Prize for best female performance at the Carthage Cinematographic Days for Tomorrow from Dawn
- Award for Best Actress at the Malmö Arab Film Festival (en) for Tomorrow at Dawn
- Best Supporting Actress Award at the Tunisian Film Festival for La Belle et la Meute.
- 2001 : Pied de guerre (The war foot) by Mohamed Guellati
- 2001 : Petite fleur (Small Flower) by Mohamed Guellati
- 2003 : Rahmen : by Elyès Baccar, choreography of Karry Kamal Karry
- 2006 : Y'en a plus bon ! (There is even better) by Mohamed Guellati
- 2006 : Vous avez de si jolis moutons, pourquoi vous ne parlez pas des moutons ? by Mohamed Guellati
- 2007 : Nakba, en marchant j'ai vu : by Mohamed Guellati and Juliano Mer-Khamis
- 2009 : Hobb Story – Sex in the (Arab) city by Lotfi Achour (acting and co-writing)
- 2010 : Romeo and Juliet of William Shakespeare by Alexander Zeldin
- 2012 : Leila and Ben – A Bloody History : by Lotfi Achour (acting and co-writing with Lotfi Achour and Jawhar Basti)
- 2014 : Je suis encore en vie (I am still alive) by Jacques Allaire
