= Nasreddine Ben Maati =

Tunisian filmmaker and actor (born 1990)

- Born: Nasreddine Ben Maati; 14 October 1990 (age 35); Tunis, Tunisia
- Occupations: Filmmaker, actor, cinematographer, assistant director, writer
- Years active: 2010–present
- Notable work: Ouled Ammar (2013), Rayes Korso (2019) and Black Medusa (2021).

Nasreddine Ben Maati (born 14 October 1990) is a Tunisian filmmaker and actor who is best known for directing the films such as Weld Ammar: A Doomed Generation and Le Feu then Coexist.

== Personal life ==
Ben Maati was born on 14 October 1990, in Tunis.

== Career ==
At the age of 16, Maati became a member of the Tunisian Federation of Amateur Filmmakers (Fédération Tunisienne des Cinéastes Amateurs, FTCA). Then he directed several short films which took part in the International Amateur Film Festival of Kélibia as well. In 2010, he directed his debut short film, Le Virage. The short was then selected for the Short Film Corner at the 2011 Cannes Film Festival. After the success of the short, he directed the next short Le Feu then Coexist in 2013.

Then in 2013, he directed his maiden documentary film Weld Ammar (Ouled Ammar or Génération Maudite, Doomed Generation). The film became a hallmark which evoke Tunisian cyber-dissidents defying Internet censorship under the regime of Zine el-Abidine Ben Ali. After the critics acclaimed documentary, Maati directed his second documentary Music and the Rebels. In 2015, he acted in the French telefilm Dette d'Honneur directed by Albert Didier.

Meanwhile, he made a supporting role in the film L'Amour des hommes directed by Mehdi Ben Attia which was released in France in February 2018. In 2019, he directed the second feature film Super Lune.

== Filmography ==
Year	Film	Role	Genre	Ref.
2010	Le Virage	Director, writer	Short film	
2013	Le Feu then Coexist	Director, writer	Short film	
2013	Giulietta	Cinematographer	Short film	
2013	Weld Ammar: A Doomed Generation	Director, writer	Documentary	
2014	La musique et les rebelles	Director	Documentary	
2015	Plus belle la vie	Jalil; assistant director	TV series	
2016	Hedi	Second assistant director	Film	
2016	Law of Lamb	First assistant director	Short film	
2017	Mektoub, My Love: Canto Uno	First assistant director	Film	
2017	Of Skin and Men	Actor, assistant director	Film	
2019	Before It's Too Late	Actor	Film	
2020	The Eagles of Carthage	First assistant director	Documentary short	
2021	Black Medusa	Assistant director	Film	
2021	Ghodwa	First assistant director	Film	
