= Baccar =

Baccar is a surname. Notable people with the surname include:

- Elyes Baccar (born 1971), Tunisian film director
- Jalila Baccar (born 1952), Tunisian actor and playwright
- Selma Baccar (born 1975), Tunisian film-maker and politician
- Taoufik Baccar (fl. 1995–2011), Tunisian politician
