= Maati =

Maati is a given name and a surname. Notable people with the name include:

- Maati Bouabid (1927–1996), Prime Minister of Morocco between 1979 and 1983
- Maati Kabbal (born 1954), Moroccan writer and essayist
- Maati Monjib (born 1962), Moroccan university professor, journalist, historian, writer and political activist
- Nasreddine Ben Maati (born 1990), Tunisian filmmaker and actor

== See also ==
- Ahmad El-Maati (born 1964), Canadian citizen who was arrested, tortured and detained for years in Syrian and Egyptian prisons due to deficient information shared by Canadian law enforcement
- Amer el-Maati (born 1963), Kuwaiti-Canadian alleged member of al-Qaeda
