= The Messiah (1975 film) =

- Directed by: Roberto Rossellini
- Starring: Pier Maria Rossi; Mita Ungaro
- Music by: Mario Nascimbene
- Release date: 25 October 1975
- Running time: 140 minutes
- Countries: Italy; France
- Language: Italian

The Messiah (Italian: Il messia) is a 1975 Italian / French film directed by Roberto Rossellini.

== Cast ==
- Pier Maria Rossi as Jesus
- Mita Ungaro as Virgin Mary
- Carlos de Carvalho as John the Baptist
- Fausto Di Bella as Saul
- Vernon Dobtcheff as Samuel
- Antonella Fasano as Mary Magdalene
- Jean Martin as Pontius Pilate
- Toni Ucci as Herod Antipas
- Vittorio Caprioli as Herod the Great
- Tina Aumont as Adulteress
- Flora Carabella as Herodias
- Raouf Ben Amor as Judas
- Luis Suárez as John
- Hedi Zoughlami as Simon Peter
- Renato Montalbano as Saint Matthew
- Raouf Ben Yaghlane as Saint Andrew
- Fadhel Jaziri as Nathaniel
- Mark Lombardo as James
- Moncef Ben Yahia as Thomas the Apostle
- Antonio Carlucci as Simon the Canaanite
- Ridha Missume as Philip the Apostle
- Slim Mzali as James - son of Zebediah
- Mohamed Ali Brikadhi as Thaddeus
- Samir Ayadi as Pharisee
- Anita Bartolucci as Samaritan
- Denise Bataille as La sorella di Erode
- John Karlsen as Caiaphas
- Mustapha Ferchiou as Jesus as a child
- Abdellatif Hamrouni as Priest
- Yatsugi Khelil as Joseph
- Abdelmajid Lakhal as 2nd Pharisee
- Cosetta Pichetti as Salome
- Renato Scarpa as Herod's brother
- Alessandro Jovino as Narrator
- Omero Capanna as Murdered Jew
- Joshua Sinclair as Guardia Romana
