= Abdelmajid Lakhal =

Tunisian theatre director and actor

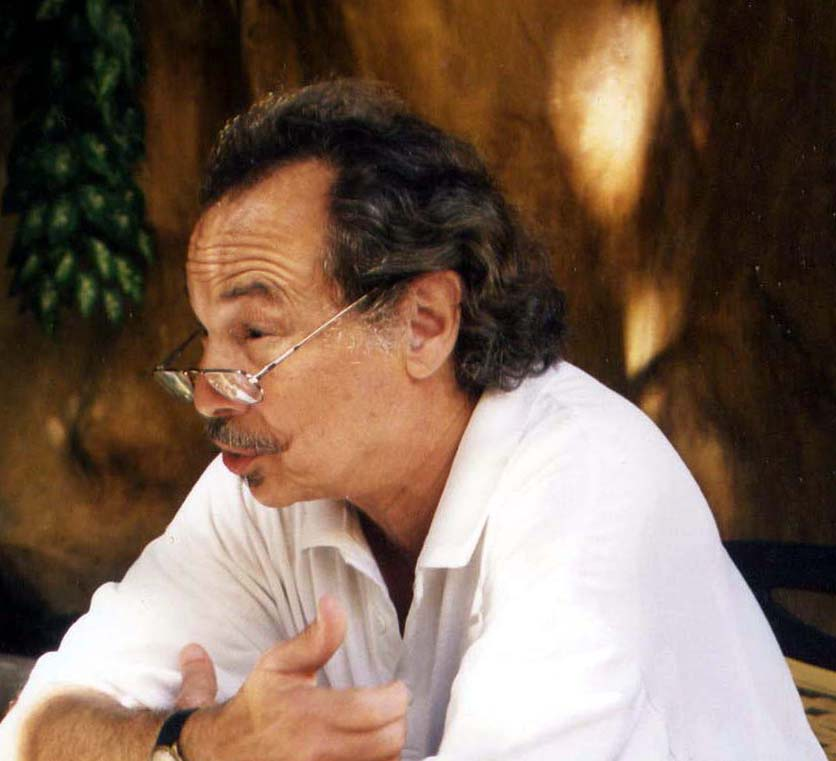
- Lakhal in 2004
- Born: 29 November 1939; Bizerte, Tunisia
- Died: 27 September 2014 (aged 74); Tunis, Tunisia
- Occupations: Actor, director
- Years active: 1948 - 2014
- Awards: Best Actor Award (Arab Television Festival) - 1983

Abdelmajid Lakhal (November 29, 1939 – September 27, 2014) was a Tunisian theatre and film actor and theatre director. He was considered to be a professional and versatile interpreter. Recently, he performed classical pieces (Carlo Goldoni, Anton Chekhov) translated into Arabic, at the Municipal theatre of Tunis, which were well received. He was known on Arab Television for acting in many telefilms.

== Biography ==
=== Early life ===
Born in Bizerte on November 29, 1939, Lakhal lived with his family at Hammam-Lif. He performed his first role at 9 years old in 1948 in 'Khātimat al-naffāf' (The end of a morphine addict).

== Career ==
He says that the passion for theatre took him "...totally when he was 16 years old....". He joined the students 'Group Jeunes Comédiens', at Hammam-Lif.

In 1960 he was a student at the National Theatre of Music and Dance of Tunis.

In 1965 he directed Molière's Georges Dandin with the al-Nuhūd Group of Tunis.

From 1966-1967 he played Flaminio from Robert Merle, Yerma from Federico García Lorca, and the Marshall from Molière's Le Bourgeois Gentilhomme.

For the 1968 adaptation of Hamlet in the town of Hammamet, Tunisia, Lakhal was assistant director to Alì Ben Ayed. In 1971 he made his debut as a professional director with '8 Ladies' by Robert Thomas.

In 1974 he directed The Merchant of Venice (Shakespeare), and in 1982 he played Magid in 'La Noce' (Luce Berthommé), which was performed again at the Théâtre du Lucernaire in Paris. He worked at the creation of 'Jafabule' (Christian Le Guillochet).

He also organized tours and directed the Group of the Theatre de Tunis, which has worked three times in the 'Théâtre de la Ville' (Paris), and also in Algeria, Morocco, Libya, Vienna, Egypt, and Lebanon.

== Filmography ==
=== As an actor ===
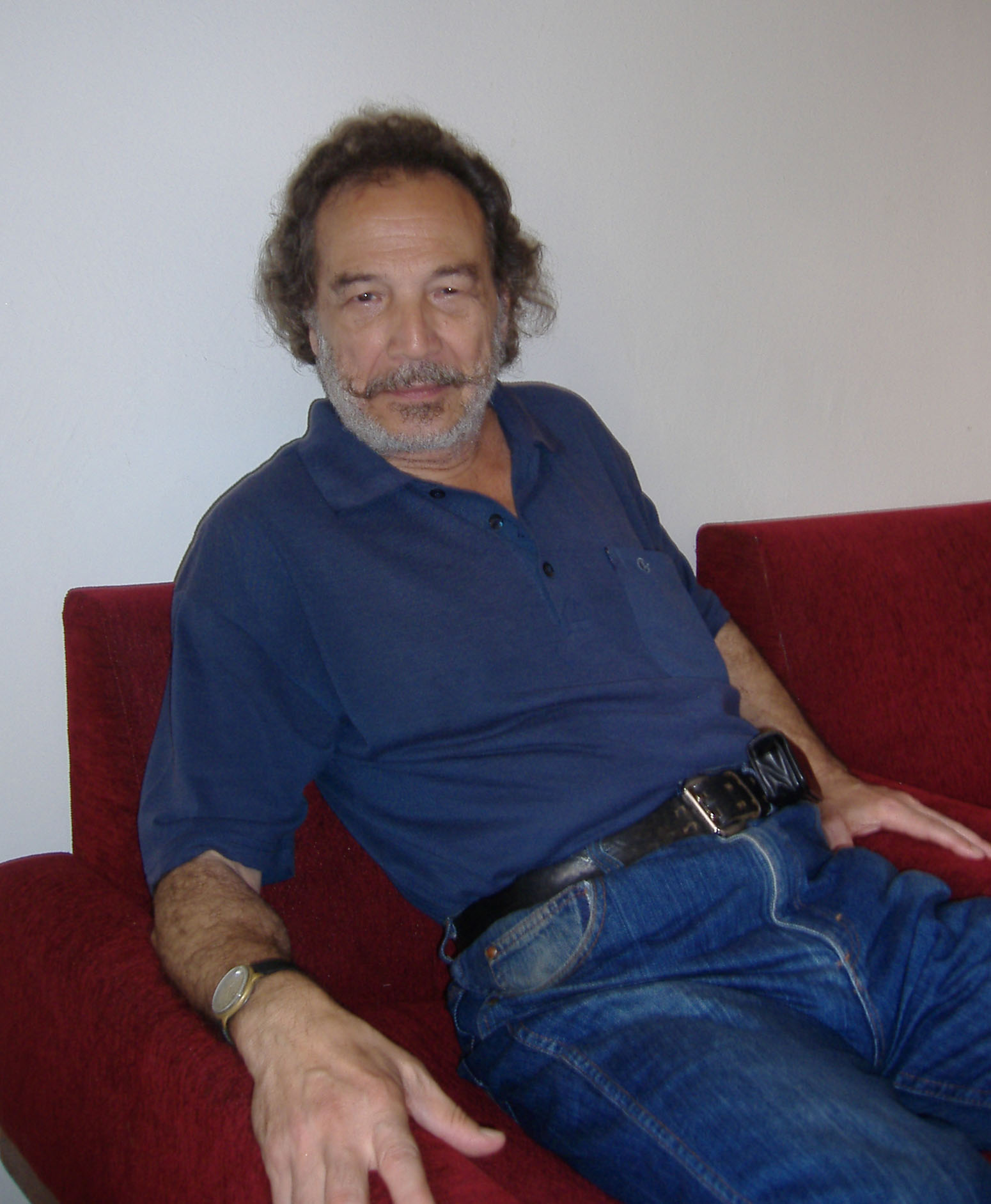
Abdelmajid Lakhal in 2007

- 1975: Il messia (of Roberto Rossellini) - 2nd Pharisee
- 1976: Jesus of Nazareth (of Franco Zeffirelli) - the Farisaeum
- 1976: Fatma 75 (of Salma Baccar)
- 1979: Aziza (of Abdellatif Ben Ammar)
- 1981: Mirages (of Abdelhafidh Bouassida)
- 1987: La mort en face (of Mohamed Damak)
- 1990: Un bambino di nome Gesù (TV Movie, of Francesco Rosi) - 2a guardia Sedeq
- 1991: Le vent des destins (of Ahmed Jemaï)
- 1993: Échec et mat (of Rachid Ferchiou)
- 2000: Fatma (of Khaled Ghorbal)
- 2000: Une Odyssée (of Brahim Babaï)
- 2005: Bab'Aziz - Old Calligrapher
- 2011: Black Gold - Old Imam (final film role)

== Theatre ==
=== Non professional ===
- 1960: Les femmes en danger of Ezzeddine Souissi
- 1964: George Dandin ou le Mari confondu of Molière with Renaissance Group
- 1974: La Vie est belle (operetta) with El Manar Group Theatre
- 1985: La Vie de temps à autre de Salah Zouaoui
- 1988: Nahar al jounun (Crazy) of Frej Slama after Taoufik Hakim with the Group of Culture of Ibn-Khaldoun.

=== Director ===
- 1971: Huit Femmes of Robert Thomas. (translation)
- 1974: The Merchant of Venice of Shakespeare (translation), at Festival international de Carthage
- 1977: Noces de sang of Federico García Lorca (adaptation)
- 1978: Une nuit des mille et une nuits of Noureddine Kasbaoui
- 1979: Bine Noumine (Entre deux songes) of Ali Douagi (opérette), opening the Festival international de Monastir
- 1981: El Forja (The Spectacle) of Lamine Nahdi, opening the 'Festival du Printemps' at the 'Théâtre municipal de Tunis'
- 1985: La Jalousie de Mohamed Labidi
- 1986: Volpone of Jules Romains and Stefan Zweig (translation by Mohamed Abdelaziz Agrebi)
- 1987: Ettassouira of Abdessalem El Bech
- 1991: Le quatrième monde d'Abdellatif Hamrouni, opening the 'Festival national de La Goulette'
- 2000: El Khsouma (Baruffe a Chioggia) of Carlo Goldoni (adaptation)
- 2003: Fine Essaada of Taoufik Hakim (adaptation)
- 2005: The Seagull of Anton Chekhov (translation)

== Television ==
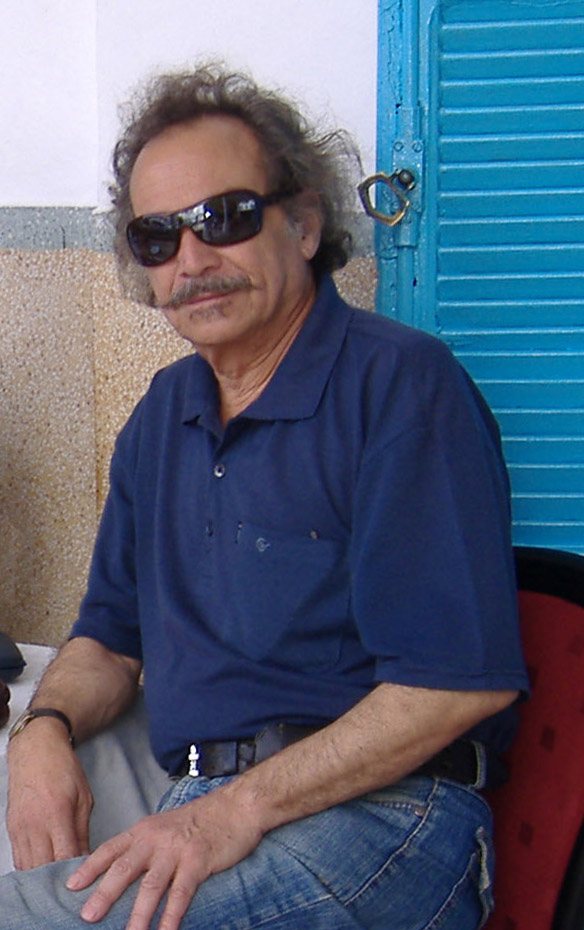
Abdelmajid Lakhal at St Georges Hotel, Tunis 2006

The television programs, in Tunisia started in 1966.

- 1967: Le quatrième acteur of Noureddine Kasbaoui
- 1967: Le Médecin malgré lui of Molière
- 1967: L'Avare of Molière
- 1970: Interdit au public of Roger Dornès and Jean Marsan
- 1973: J'avoue of Hamadi Arafa
- 1974: Histoire d'un poème de Noureddine Chouchane
- 1976: Ziadatou Allah II of Ahmed Harzallah (telefilm)
- 1983: Yahia Ibn Omar d'Hamadi Arafa (telefilm) (1st prize for interpretation)
- 1984: Cherche avec nous d'Abderrazak Hammami (telefilm monthly for 4 years)
- 1985: El Watek bellah el hafsi of Hamadi Arafa (telefilm)
- 1989: Cantara of Jean Sagols (telefilm of Antenne 2)
- 1991: Les gens, une histoire d'Hamadi Arafa
- 1992: Autant en emporte le vent de Slaheddine Essid (Tunisian telefilm of 14 episodes)
- 1994: Par précaution de Safoudh Kochairi
- 1996: L'homme de la médina de Paolo Barzman
- 1996: Abou Raihana de Fouaz Abdelki (30 episodes)
- 1999-2001: Souris à la vie d'Abderrazak Hammami (twice 30 episodes)
