= Red Path =

- French: Les Enfants rouges
- Directed by: Lotfi Achour
- Written by: Doria Achour; Lotfi Achour; Sylvain Cattenoy; Natacha de Pontchara
- Produced by: Anissa Daoud; Sébastien Hussenot
- Starring: Ali Helali; Yassine Samouni
- Cinematography: Wojciech Staroń
- Edited by: Malek Chatta
- Music by: Jawhar Basti; Venceslas Catz
- Production companies: Artistes Producteurs Associés; La Luna Productions; Shipsboy
- Distributed by: Nour Films; Sovereign Films
- Release date: 9 September 2024 (Locarno)
- Running time: 101 minutes
- Countries: Tunisia; France; Belgium; Poland; Saudi Arabia; Qatar
- Language: Arabic

Red Path (French: Les Enfants rouges) is a drama film, directed by Lotfi Achour and released in 2024. Based on a true story, the film stars Ali Helali as Ashraf, a young boy who is exploring Tunisia's Mghila Mountain with his older cousin Nizar (Yassine Samouni) when the boys are set upon by jihadist terrorists, who kill Nizar and force Ashraf to walk back home alone with Nizar's severed head as a warning to their community.

The cast also includes Eya Bouteraa, Wided Dabebi, Latifa Gafsi, Noureddine Hamami, Rayen Karoui, Mounir Khazri, Jemii Lamari, Younes Naouar and Salha Nasraoui in supporting roles.

The film is a co-production of companies from Tunisia, France, Belgium, Poland, Saudi Arabia and Qatar.

== Cast ==
- Ali Helali
- Yassine Samouni
- Eya Bouteraa
- Wided Dabebi
- Latifa Gafsi
- Noureddine Hamami
- Rayen Karoui
- Mounir Khazri
- Jemii Lamari
- Younes Naouar
- Salha Nasraoui

== Release ==
The film premiered in the Filmmakers of the Present (Cineasti del Presente) program at the 77th Locarno Film Festival. It was subsequently screened at the 2024 Vancouver International Film Festival, where it won the Audience Award for the Vanguard program.

In November, it competed for the Golden Peacock Award at the 55th International Film Festival of India in International competition section and was screened on 22 November. It won the 2024 Golden Tanit and Audience Award at the Carthage Film Festival.
