= Alka Sadat =

- الکا سادات
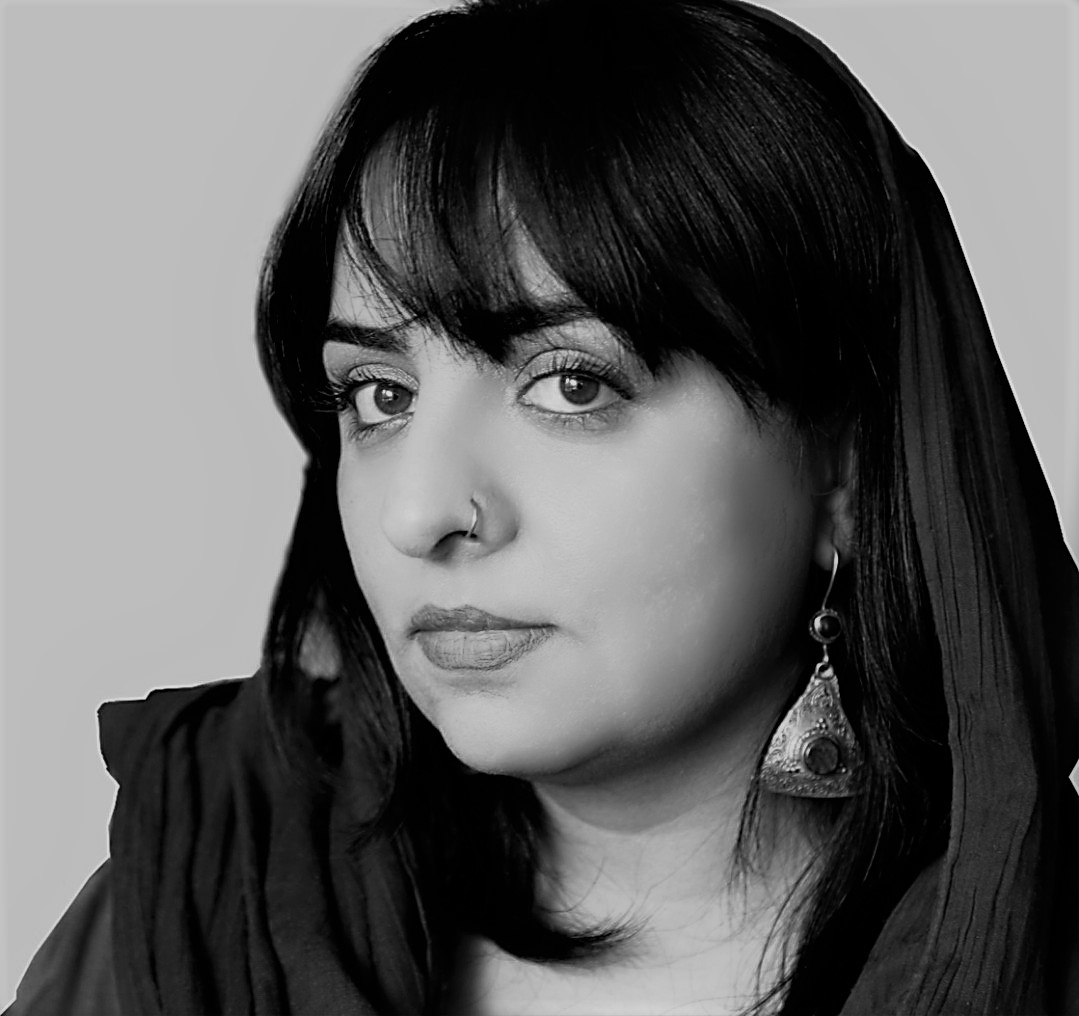
- Alka Sadat in 2015
- Born: 1988 (age 37–38); Herat, Afghanistan
- Occupation: Documentary filmmaker
- Relatives: Roya Sadat (sister)
- Website: alkasadat.com

Alka Sadat (Arabic: الکا سادات; born 1988) is an Afghan documentary and feature film producer, director and cameraman. She became famous with her first 25-minute film Half Value Life, which highlights social injustice and crime; the film won several awards. She is the younger sister of Roya Sadat, the first Afghan woman film producer and director. The two sisters have collaborated in many film productions from 2004 and were instrumental in establishing the Roya Film House. She has made 15 documentaries and one short fiction feature film.

== Biography ==
Alka Sadat was born in 1988 in Herat, Afghanistan at a time when the Taliban regime was in force. In view of the severe restrictions imposed by the Taliban on the freedom of woman in education and social life, her mother educated her eight daughters at home. Alka Sadat then started assisting her older sister, Roya Sadat, as costume designer in making the fiction film Three Dots, a 60-minute film which highlights tribulations of a widow trying to make a living in an atmosphere of drug peddling that prevailed in the country. Her sister then advised her to make documentaries. As Alka Sadat had no experience in making the documentaries she went through a 14-day training programme conducted by the German Goethe Institute at Kabul.

== Filmmaking ==
Sadat has produced 15 documentaries and one short film.

In 2004, Alka and Roya Sadat founded the film production company Roya Film House.

Her first 25-minute short documentary film, Half-Value Life, was made in 2008. The film highlights Maria Bashir, the first Afghan women's rights activist. Bashir acts in her real life role of an Afghan woman public prosecutor from Herat Province dealing with the underworld people involved in crime and drug peddling. Some of the scenes presented in the documentary relate to family battering and rape cases of child brides. For this film she won several awards at the inaugural 2011 Autumn Human Rights Film Festival (AHRFF) in Kabul and at the 2013 London Feminist Film Festival.

In 2005, Sadat produced and directed the film We Are Post-modernist for Babak Payama & Roya Film House, which followed a 14-year-old girl in Afghanistan.

During 2008–2009 she worked for the Pangea Foundation and produced A Woman Sings in the Desert, a documentary film.

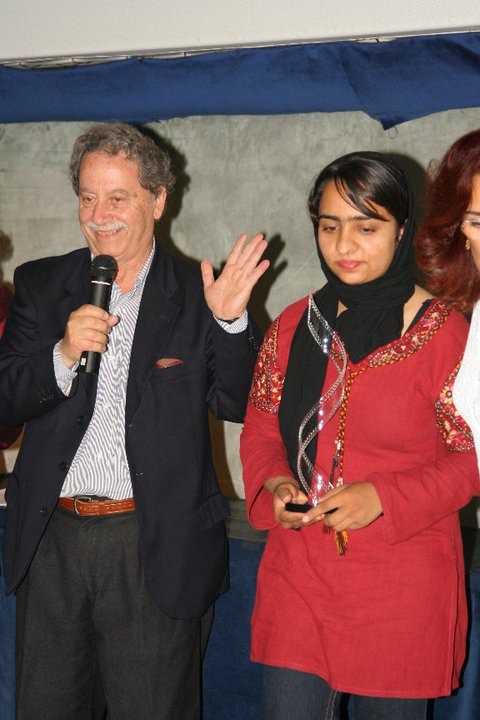
Film Festival Italy 2007

She has directed many films focused on women's issues in Afghanistan. During 2012–2013, as script writer and director, she made three documentaries for the United Nations Assistance Mission in Afghanistan (UNAMA) in collaboration with Afghan Radio and television. These documentaries highlight the ten year efforts of UN and other agencies in reconstruction of Afghanistan. They highlight issues related to children on their rights, child marriage, labour and child abuse. These documentaries also deal with rights of women and other social issues concerned with education, police, drug addiction and so forth. She also produced a documentary titled Afghanistan Night Story, related to the elite commandos of Afghan Army. Her 2015 documentary, Afghanistan Women in 1393 Election, highlights participation of women in the elections. The latest award she received was at the Aljazeera International Documentary Film Festival! 2011 on "Public Liberties & Human Rights".

=== Film festivals ===
For her first film she received the Afghan Peace Prize and since then has made many documentaries for which she has won many international awards as a producer, cameraman, and director and also for her work in Television.

Sadat participated and presented her documentaries at the "Women's Voices Now Film Festival" held in Los Angeles in 2011.

Both had participated in the "Muslim World: A Short-Film Festival", organized at the Los Angeles Film School, where 32 films from Afghanistan were featured. In 2013, she coordinated in holding the first Afghanistan International Women's Film Festival.

==== Jury member ====
- 2017: head of the jury in 18th Jeonju International Film Festival South Korea
- 2015: London Feminist Film Festival (UK)32
- 2015: 60 Second Film Festival (Afghanistan)
- 2014: Afghanistan Student Film Festival (Afghanistan)
- 2013: Afghan Contemporary Art Prize (Afghanistan)
- 2011: Asiatica Film Festival (Italy Roma)

== Filmography ==
=== Documentaries ===
- We Are Post-modernist (2005); director and producer
- 1,2,3? (2006)
- Half-Value Life (2008)
- A Woman Sings in the Desert (2009)
- After 35 years
- Kabul Sea
- Afghanistan Night Story (2015)
- Afghanistan Women in 1393 Election (2015)
- From Kabul to the Freedom Quarter (2025)

== Personal life ==
Sadat left Afghanistan for the Netherlands in 2015.
