= Mohamed Driss =

Tunisian actor, theatre director and writer

- Born: 1944 (age 81–82)
- Occupations: Writer, actor, director
- Years active: since 1961
- Notable work: Ismaïl Pacha

Mohamed Driss (born 1944) is a Tunisian writer, actor, and director of theatre. Since 1988 he has been the director of the National Theatre of Tunisia.

He began his career in 1961 and is, subsequently, an actor, both amateur and professional, a student in Tunis and Paris, producer, and director. From 1969 to 1972, he was an actor and stage assistant at the Théâtre de la Tempête led by Jean-Marie Serreau, of which he wrote:

"À cette époque, j'ai commencé à jouer des rôles secondaires dans le théâtre tunisien, mais la situation du théâtre et mes confrontations continues avec les responsables n'étaient pas encourageantes. Un jour, en pleine dépression, j'ai eu Serreau au téléphone et me plaignais de mon état. Il m'a dit: il est temps de vous lancer dans le théâtre comme un professionnel. Venez joindre ma compagnie théâtrale."

(Rough English translation): "At this time, I started to play secondary roles in the theatre of Tunisia, but the situation of the theater and my ongoing confrontations with those responsible were not encouraging. One day in full depression, I had Serreau on the phone and complained to him of my condition. He said it is time to get started in theatre as a professional. Come join my theatre company."

He voluntarily exiled himself to France until 1985 and returned to Tunisia in 1988 to lead the National Theatre of Tunisia after Driss wrote Ismaïl Pacha (1986) and Salut l'instit. He took measures to renew the theater of Tunisia and engaged in numerous shows and theatrical projects. However, Driss was also interested in other art forms and, in 2003, he founded the National School of Circus Arts-Tunis, of which he said:

"Le centre est un projet et une décision présidentielle qui sert à mettre en évidence le rôle que peut jouer l'art du cirque dans la culture arabe. Dans ce centre, on trouve le théâtre, la musique, la danse, les arts plastiques et le cirque artistique."

(Rough English translation): "The centre is a project and a presidential decision that serves to highlight the role the art of the circus in Arab culture. In this centre is the theatre, music, dance, visual arts and circus arts."

In 2005, he founded the National Centre of Circus Arts and Visual Arts and led the 12th Theatre Days of Carthage. Driss also paid tribute to the historian Ibn Khaldoun by writing an opera in his honor.

== Filmography ==
=== Distinctions ===
- 1987: National Theater Price (Tunisia);
- 2004: Commander of the National Order of Merit (Tunisia);
- 2009: Officer of the order of arts and letters (France);
- 2012: First Class of The National order of Merit (Tunisia).

=== Works ===
==== As director ====
- 1986: Ismail Pacha
- 1987: Hi Tutor
- 1988: Long Live Shakespeare (Iaïchou Shakespeare)
- 1989: The Compagnion of Hearts
- 2000: Haddith (Speech)
- 2002: La Fuite (The Escape), text of Gao Xingjian
- 2003: Mourad III, text of Habib Boularès
- 2005: Al Moutachaâbitoun (The Opportunists)
- 2007: Othello or The Star of the Day
- 2008: Le Malade imaginaire (The imaginary invalid)
- 2009: Rajel ou Mraa (a man and a Woman)
- 2009: Hedda Gabler or The General's Daughter

==== Actor ====
===== Cinema =====
- 1978: La Noce (The Wedding) of Fadhel Jaibi and Fadhel Jaziri
- 1990: Halfaouine, child of the terrasses of Férid Boughedir as Salih
- 1996: A Summer in La Goulette of Férid Boughedir as Miro
- 2004: Noce d'été (Summer Wedding) of Mokhtar Ladjimi
- 2016: Eclipses (Khousouf) of Fadhel Jaziri
- 2019: Porto Farina of Ibrahim Letaief as Fraj

===== Télévision =====
- 1980: L'Aéropostale, courrier du ciel (Airmail, mail from heaven) of Gilles Grangier as Ataf
- 2009: Maktoub (Destiny) (season 2) of Sami Fehri as Mr Abess
- 2015: Tunisian Stories of Nada Mezni Hafaiedh
