= Sima's Song =

2024 film by Roya Sadat

- Directed by: Roya Sadat
- Written by: Roya Sadat; Aziz Deildar; Roelof Jan Minneboo
- Produced by: Alba Sotorra; Frank Hoeve; Maeva Savinien; Stefano Centini
- Starring: Mozdah Jamalzadah; Niloufar Koukhani; Max Grosse; Nelofer Pazira; Leena Alam; Aziz Deildaar; Paeman Arianfar; Halima Ahmadi
- Cinematography: Ton Peters
- Music by: Xavi Font
- Production companies: Alba Sotorra; BALDR Film; Urban Factory
- Distributed by: Pluto Film
- Release date: 2024
- Running time: 98 minutes
- Country: Afghanistan

Sima's Song is a 2024 film directed by Roya Sadat. It had its world premiere at the Tokyo International Film Festival. It won the audience award at the Invisible Cinema International Festival and earned a special mention at the Som Cinema Festival.

== Production ==
Sadat made the film in 2024 while exiled from Afghanistan following Taliban control in 2021. As a result, she filmed it in Athens in November 2023 and edited it in Barcelona instead.

== Critical reception ==
Screen Daily concluded that "the film’s most effective device is also its simplest: a montage of archive photographs of Afghan women from the liberated '70s until the present day."

Cineuropa said that "While Sima's Song may not fully satisfy viewers who prioritise character depth over historical exposition, its message still resonates deeply," lauding its foregrounding of women's experiences in a "male-dominated historical context."

Asian Movie Pulse called it "an excellent film that manages to highlight the issues Afghanistan faces and have been facing in the most eloquent fashion, while presenting a story that remains entertaining from beginning to end."

== Other ==
Sima's Song was selected for competition at the Red Sea International Film Festival. However, Sadat was briefly prohibited from boarding her flight from Dallas Fort Worth International Airport to Jeddah, Saudi Arabia due to passport issues. Ultimately, she was allowed to board thanks to support from festival organizers.
