= Abdo & Saneya =

2024 silent film by Omar Bakry

- Directed by: Omar Bakry
- Written by: Omar Bakry
- Produced by: Inji El Gammal; Mohamed Hefzy; Jaselle Martino
- Starring: Omar Bakry; Inji El Gammal; Haythem Noor
- Cinematography: Vic Roxas
- Edited by: Salah Anwar
- Music by: Alexandre Azaria
- Production companies: Film-Clinic; Timewormz; Chaconia Pictures; Aquarius Lion Productions
- Release date: 2024
- Running time: 100 minutes
- Country: Egypt

Abdo & Saneya is a 2024 film directed by Omar Bakry and starring Inji El Gammal. A black-and-white silent film, it premiered at the Red Sea International Film Festival and was the only Egyptian film in the Arab Spectacular category. It is considered the first Middle Eastern contemporary silent film.

Mohamed Hefzy, who produced the film and received the Variety International Vanguard Producer Award prior to its screening, stated that "It’s completely different from anything you’ve seen in Arab cinema. It’s like a trip to a land unknown."

== Synopsis ==
The film follows Abdo and Saneya, two Egyptian peasants, as they arrive in New York City as migrants.

== Critical reception ==
Webdo stated that "Abdo and Saneya is much more than a tribute to classical cinema. It is an ode to love, resilience and human capacity to adapt and overcome obstacles. This film recalls that simple stories, told with sincerity and talent, can touch the hearts of spectators timely."
