= National Theatre of Tunisia =

Theatre in Tunis, Tunisia

Coordinates: 36°48′31.3″N 10°10′3.6″E

Logo.

The National Theatre of Tunisia (French: Théâtre national tunisien) is a Tunisian Government-owned corporation of a cultural nature. Financially autonomous, the theatre was created by Law No. 113 of 30 December 1983 relating to acts 73-74 of the Finance Act of 1983 and meets the same rules and regulations as public institutions. It has been directed by Mohamed Driss since 1988 and the current secretary general is Hamdi Hemaïdi.

== Location ==
The Ministry of Culture decided in 1988 that the headquarters of the National Theatre was to be located in the Khaznadar palace, in the Tunis quarter of Halfaouine, near Bab Souika. Upon the designation, the palace was renamed Palace Theater. (قصر المسرح) Built in the mid-nineteenth century by the Grand Vizier Mustafa Khaznadar, the palace served from 1903 to 1986 as an elementary school.

== Renovations ==
Mohamed Driss, when appointed to head the theatre in 1988, began a large renovation and restoration of cultural spaces of the National Theatre. Among the renovated spaces include:

- the studio Habiba Msika for physical exercises and dance;
- the studio Aly Ben Ayed for rehearsals and training;
- the workshop costumes;
- and a carpentry workshop.

The former Le Paris cinema, as decided of the National Theatre by the new president Zine el-Abidine Ben Ali, was also renovated. Since then, the room, renamed the Fourth art room (الفن الرابع) has been equipped with modern technical infrastructure. Among the improvements made include:

- the renovation of the facade of the hall;
- management halls;
- cool room;
- the upholstery of the chairs;
- and the creation of a Rached Manai design studio.

These developments allowed the opening of the theater to the public in October 1993. The hall can accommodate 350 people and is home, every cultural season (from October 1 to June 30), to more than 80 performances. In addition, a rehearsal hall was built in the "palace theater" Halfaouine opened in March 1993.

Work for communication between the Fourth art room and the upper floor housing space of intermission, are in a state of studies.
