= Samir Ayadi =

Tunisian playwright

- Born: 24 April 1947 (age 78); Métouia
- Citizenship: French protectorate of Tunisia, Tunisia
- Occupations: Actor, Writer, Playwright, Screenwriter

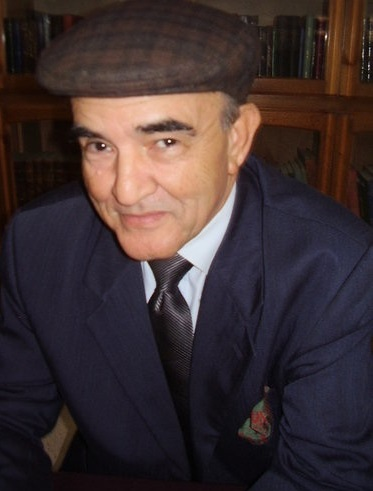
Samir Ayadi

Samir Ayadi (Arabic: سمير أيادي) (2008–1947) was a Tunisian playwright.

== Biography ==
Born in Métouia, a village in southern Tunisia, his family moved to the capital Tunis when he was three years old. He studied at Khaznadar High School, where he graduated in 1966, then at the Faculty of Arts and Humanities of Tunis.

== Literary and theatrical work ==
Ayadi was a prolific writer for thirty-two years, including publishing several short stories including "Sakhab Essamt", "Kadhalika Yaktouloun el Amal", "Zaman Ezzakharef" and "Hadir el Echq fel Ashar". He is also the author of a large number of plays including Ras El Ghoul, El Jazya El Hilaliya, Atchan ya Sabaya, Elissa (Didon), Sindbad, Sabra, A night in La Goulette, Taht Essour, Halawani Bab Souika and Mondo.

A founding member of the movement of the literary avant-garde in Tunis, he chaired the newspaper Culture, published by the literary club of the House of Culture Ibn-Khaldoun; the newspaper Al Massar, published by the Union of Tunisian Writers; and the newspaper La Vie culturelle, published at the time by the Ministry of Culture. He also chaired the International Festival of Carthage in the early 1980s.

== Filmography ==
Year	Title	Role	Notes
1974	Sejnane		
1975	The Messiah	Pharisee	
1976	Les Ambassadeurs		
2003	Le soleil assassiné		
