= Festival International du Film Amateur de Kélibia =

Annual international film festival held in Kélibia, Tunisia

- Location: Kélibia, Tunisia
- Founded: 1964
- Artistic director: Adel Abid
- Festival date: 19–26 August (2023), 17–24 August (2024)
- Language: International
- Website: ftcafifak.com

The Festival International du Film Amateur de Kélibia (FIFAK, International Amateur Film Festival of Kélibia) is an annual international film festival for amateur filmmakers at Kélibia, Tunisia. It was founded in 1964 as the oldest film event in Tunisia and is organised by the Fédération Tunisienne des Cinéastes Amateurs (FTCA, formerly Association des Jeunes Cinéastes Tunisiens, AJCT). The Tunisian Ministry of Cultural Affairs and the town of Kélibia lend their support. A number of later well-known filmmakers debuted at FIFAK, such as Salma Baccar (Tunisia), Ridha Behi (Ridha El Bahi, Tunisia), Ahmed Ben Kamla (Benkamla, Algeria), Ferid Boughedir (Tunisia), Sheila Graber (Great-Britain), Nanni Moretti (Italy), and Diego Rísquez (Venezuela).

== Awards ==
FIFAK annually awards several prizes:

- Grand Prize: The Golden Falcon (La faucon d'or).
- Special Jury Prize.
- Best Fiction Film.
- Best Documentary Film
- Best Animation/Experimental Film.
- Special mentions.

=== 2023 ===
Among the many 2023 awardees the following productions were mentioned:

==== National ====
- Grand Prix National: Caged Bastards by Wadii Klai and Khalil Said, Club des Cinéastes Amateurs d'Hammam-Lif [FTCA]
- Jury Award: Bent Jebel (La fille de la montagne) by Hela Barguaoui
- Best Student Film: Six Tours (Six Towers) by Maya Blouza
- Best Independent Amateur Film: Acteur muet (Le Figurant) by Nabil Ben Rejeb and Justus Lodeman.

==== Parallel awards ====
- Prix de la ligue tunisienne des droits de l’homme (Tunisian Human Rights League, LTDH), section Kélibia: special mention of Sire ex Machina by Safa Khiari, Club des Cinéastes Amateurs d'Hammam-Lif (FTCA)
- Prix de la ligue du film indépendant: Visions floues by Khawla Hwiji
- Prix d’Amnesty International-Tunisie: bin el binin (Entre-Deux) by Heytham Moumni, École supérieure de l’audiovisuel, Carthage University, Tunisia
- Prix d’encouragement à la réalisation of the Association des réalisateurs de films tunisiens (ARFT): Entre les deux rives by Djitta Bellotto Nikolo.

==== International ====
- Golden Falcon: L’été, la ville et un appareil photo (Summer, City and a Camera) » by Anas Zawahri, Palestine
- Jury Award: Jours sans (Days Without), by Ivar Erik Yeoman, Estonia. An Estonian-Portuguese-British coproduction
- Best Fiction Prize: Cinéma sans le sou (Penniless Cinema), by Ali Arefnasab, Iran
- Special Jury Mentions: À l’unisson (Nathalie Dunselman, France), To the Moon and Back (Shuqin Li, Japan), and Fisherman (Mahdi Zamanpoor Kisari, Iran)
- Best Animation Film: Serveur recherché (Waiter Wanted), by Diana Alexandrovna Bolchakova, Russia.
