= Saba (2024 film) =

2024 debut feature film by Maksud Hossain

- Directed by: Maksud Hossain
- Written by: Trilora Khan; Maksud Hossain
- Produced by: Uri Singer; Arifur Rahman; Tamim Abdul Majid; Maksud Hossain; Trilora Khan; Mehazabien Chowdhury; Barkat Hossain Polash; Christoph Thoke (Mogador Film)
- Starring: Mehazabien Chowdhury; Rokeya Prachy; Mostafa Monwar
- Cinematography: Barkat Hossain Polash
- Edited by: Sameer Ahmed
- Music by: Amman Abbasi
- Production company: Fusion Pictures
- Release dates: 7 September 2024 (TIFF); 26 September 2025 (Bangladesh)
- Running time: 95 Minutes
- Country: Bangladesh
- Language: Bengali

Saba is a Bangladeshi drama film. It is debut feature film directed by Maksud Hossain. It premiered at the 2024 Toronto International Film Festival, showed at various other film festivals like the Busan International Film Festival and the Red Sea International Film Festival, and released in Bangladesh on September 26, 2025. It won third place at the Bengaluru International Film Festival.

Mehazabien Chowdhury won the 5th BIFA Awards in Best Film Actress category for her performance.

== Cast ==
- Mehazabien Chowdhury as Saba
- Rokeya Prachy as Shirin
- Mostafa Monwar as Ankur
- Schumonn Patwary
- Ashok Bepari as Abbas Karim
- Riasat Salekin as Shisha Customer
- Anjuman Shirin as Dr. Mili
- Syeda Nawshin Islam as Female Nurse
- Hashnat Ripon as Hesitant Husband
- Pran Roy as Police Officer
- Jahangir Alam as Police Constable
- Sohel Towfiq as Ankur's Roommate
- Taslima Hossain Nodi as Bushra
- Kazi Delowar Hemonto as Hospital Receptionist
- Sharmin Sultana Shormi
- Golam Shahariar Shikto as Salesman
- Ummay Marium as Female Receptionist
- Maeen Hasan as Shisha Lounge Server
- Syed Golam Sarwar as Old Pharmacist
- Rafayatullah Sohan as Male Nurse

== Production ==
Starting in 2021, Hossain took Saba's script to "various labs and markets" around the world, including India, France, and South Korea.

== Critical reception ==
Screen Daily wrote: "A modest tale in the social realist tradition, the demands of Saba's plot never overpower the focus on the characters. Individuals here are flawed and vulnerable, capable of both kindness and cruelty."

Variety called it an "accomplished debut" with "wildly interesting characters and subject matter, and comes ever-so-close to being great, if only it would hold on to its drama a little longer."

Moveable Fest called the film "vibrant" and lauded its on-screen relationships.

Collider commended Hossain for tackling South Asian cinema through social realism, calling Saba a "remarkable debut."
