= Maksud Hossain =

Bangladeshi film director

- মাকসুদ হোসেন
- Born: Abu Dhabi, UAE
- Education: Purdue University
- Occupations: Film director, writer, producer
- Notable work: Saba, Three Beauties

Maksud Hossain (Bengali: মাকসুদ হোসেন) is a Bangladeshi writer, director, and producer best known for his debut feature film Saba (2024), which was officially selected at major international festivals including the Toronto International Film Festival, Busan International Film Festival, Red Sea International Film Festival, and Göteborg Film Festival, among others. He won a Student Academy Award for his short Three Beauties (2006). He is also a Berlinale Talents 2025 fellow.

Hossain was born and raised in Abu Dhabi, United Arab Emirates. He began experimenting with filmmaking in his teens, using a family camcorder to create short films. After completing high school, he moved to the United States for his undergraduate studies, where he continued developing his craft by making short films. He studied at Purdue University.

== Career ==
Maksud Hossain is a Bangladeshi filmmaker who began his career directing television commercials for leading brands. He gained international recognition with his short Three Beauties (2006), which won a Student Academy Award. He is the founder of Fusion Pictures, a film production company based in Dhaka, Bangladesh.

Hossain's debut feature film, Saba (2024), premiered at the Toronto International Film Festival and was subsequently selected by major international film festivals including the Busan International Film Festival, Red Sea International Film Festival, and Göteborg Film Festival among others. Inspired by personal caregiving experiences, Saba (2024) received widespread critical acclaim. Variety described it as "an impressive debut about a family trapped in Bangladesh's poor disability infrastructure," highlighting its poignant narrative and social relevance. Screen Daily praised the film's "compassionate human drama" that sensitively explores the tensions in a caregiver relationship.

Saba (2024) was ranked 11th in Asian Movie Pulse's list of the 15 Best West-Central-South Asian Films of 2024, recognizing it as a debut that resonates with fans of realist social and family dramas. Additionally, renowned critic and curator Meenakshi Shedde included Saba in her Top 10 South Asian and Diaspora Films of 2024, further cementing its status as a significant work in contemporary Asian cinema. Babymoon is his upcoming film.

== Filmography ==
Filmography of Maksud Hossain
Year	Title	Role	Notes	Ref.
2006	Three Beauties	Writer-director	Short film; winner of the Student Academy Awards	
2007	Status	Writer-director	Short film	
2011	Bahattor Ghonta	Writer-director	Short film	
2020	Remakri	Writer-director	Short film	
2024	Saba	Writer-director	Feature film; premiered at Toronto International Film Festival	

Maksud Hossain frequently collaborates with co-writer Trilora Khan. Their most notable collaboration is Saba (2025), a feature film inspired by Khan's personal experiences as a caregiver. Their work together is characterized by a commitment to emotional authenticity and socially conscious storytelling.

== Awards and recognition ==
Hossain won a Student Academy Award for his short film Three Beauties. His debut feature Saba was selected for several international labs and markets, including the Global Media Makers Los Angeles Residency, Asian Project Market, Cannes Film Festival's Co-production Day, Produire au Sud, and NFDC Film Bazaar's Co-Production Market.
