= Lotfi Achour =

Tunisian writer, producer and director

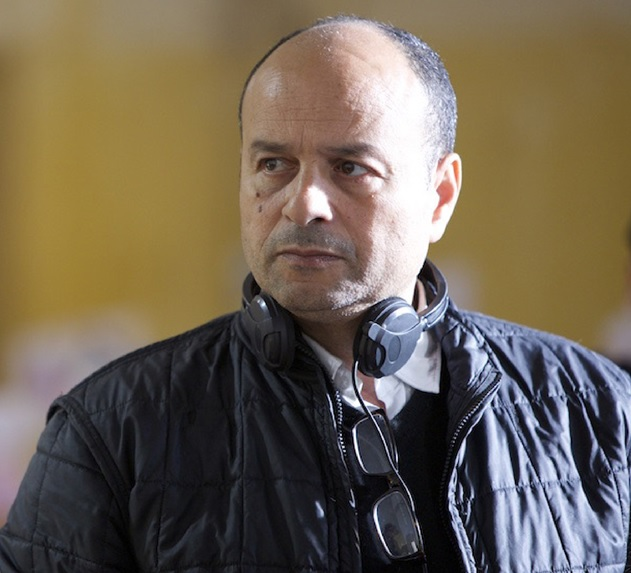
- Born: Bab Souika
- Citizenship: Tunisia
- Education: Sorbonne University
- Occupations: Writer, producer, director
- Relatives: Doria Achour (daughter)

Lotfi Achour (Arabic: لطفي عاشور) is a Tunisian writer, producer and director for theater and cinema. He is the author of more than 25 theater productions on different stages (London, Paris, Festival In d'Avignon, Tunis, Carthage, Hammamet, Byblos, Kinshasa, Yaoundé…). His last show was co-produced by the Royal Shakespeare Company for the 2012 Olympic Games London.

In cinema, he produced three award-winning shorts presented at dozens of festivals, including Father (Père) and Law of Lamb (La Laine sur le dos), which screened in the short film competition at the 2016 Cannes Film Festival.

In 2016, he directed and produced his first feature film, Burning Hope (Demain dès l'aube). He followed up in 2024 with Red Path (Les Enfants rouges).

== Early life ==
He was born in Bab Souika, an emblematic cultural area of the Medina of Tunis. Achour arrived in France at age twenty, where he attended Sorbonne University to pursue cinema and theater. He took part in the Varan workshops on documentary filmmaking.

== Career ==
He associated with the author Natacha Pontcharra, with whom he created a dozen texts in residence in various drama centers and national scenes, including La Chartreuse de Villeneuve Lez Avignon, where he directed three shows, including L’Angélie, a show created at the Avignon Festival in 1998, and billed as "The best show in Avignon festival", by Le Soir in Belgium. Achour thus became the first Tunisian director to occur in the "IN" of Avignon Festival.

Working in both Arabic and French, he designed and implemented international projects involving multidisciplinary artistic collaborations with artists from different nationalities and backgrounds. He ran the Rio Theatre in Grenoble for four years, making it exclusively for contemporary art and living artists.

He designed an installation for the Nuit Blanche in Paris 2006.

In 2009, he joined Anissa Daoud, actress and author, and created the APA, Artistes Producteurs Associés (Producers Artists Associated), a structure for innovative creation that produces movies, theater plays, and musical performances.

== Personal life ==
Achour is married to a Russian playwright. His daughter Doria Achour is an actress and film director.

== Cinema ==
=== Features ===
- 2016: Burning Hope (Demain dès l'aube)
- 2024: Red Path (Les Enfants rouges)

=== Short movies ===
- 2006: Ordure
- 2015: Father (Père)
- 2016: Law of Lamb (La Laine sur le dos)
- 2022: Blind Spot (Angle mort)

== Theatre ==
- 1991: Cet assassin-là vous aime (Written by Natacha de Pontcharra)
- 1993: Œil de cyclone (Written by Natacha de Pontcharra)
- 1994: La Gazelle et l'enfant (Written by Abdelwahab Meddeb)
- 1994: Portrait d'art, baptême et mariage (Written by Natacha de Pontcharra)
- 1995: Zeyneb (Written by d'Aroussia Nallouti)
- 1996: Mickey la torche (Written by Natacha de Pontcharra)
- 1997: La Trempe (Written by Natacha de Pontcharra)
- 1998: L'Angélie (Written by Natacha de Pontcharra)
- 2000: Dancing (Written by Natacha de Pontcharra)
- 2000: Les Brûlants
- 2000: Les Ratés (Written by Natacha de Pontcharra)
- 2000: Essbaïhi (Written by Taoufik Jebali)
- 2002: La Franchise c'est bien (Written by Natacha de Pontcharra)
- 2002: Oum (Written by Adel Hakim)
- 2004: La Traversée de Gibran Khalil Gibran (Music by Zad Moultaka)
- 2006: Ichkabad (Written byTaoufik Jebali et Mohamed Raja Farhat)
- 2007: La Comédie indigène
- 2009: Hobb Story, Sex in the (Arab) City
- 2012: Macbeth, Leïla and Ben: a Bloody History (coproduced by Royal Shakespeare Company)
