= Hanami (film) =

- Promotional release poster
- Directed by: Denise Fernandes
- Screenplay by: Denise Fernandes; Telmo Churro
- Produced by: Eugenia Mumenthaler; David Epiney; Luís Urbano; Sandro Aguilar
- Starring: Dailma Mendes; Sanaya Andrade; Alice da Luz
- Cinematography: Alana Mejía Gonzalez
- Edited by: Selin Dettwiler
- Music by: Rahel Zimmermann
- Production companies: Alina Film; O Som e a Fúria; Ventura Film; RSI Radiotelevisione svizzera
- Release date: 14 August 2024 (Locarno)
- Running time: 96 minutes
- Countries: Switzerland; Portugal; Cape Verde
- Language: Cape Verdean Creole

Hanami is a 2024 drama film co-written and directed by Denise Fernandes in her first feature film. A co-production between Switzerland, Portugal and Cape Verde, it centres on the coming of age of Nana on the island of Fogo in Cape Verde. The film premiered at the 77th Locarno Film Festival, where it won the Best Emerging Director Award, and was later screened at festivals including Vancouver, London, Chicago and Göteborg.

== Synopsis ==
The film follows Nana, a young girl left behind on the island of Fogo in Cape Verde when her mother Nia leaves in search of a better life. As Nana grows up, she is eventually reunited with her mother as a teenager.

== Cast ==
The cast includes:

- Alice da Luz as Nia
- Dailma Mendes as Nana in childhood
- Sanaya Andrade as Nana in adolescence

== Production ==
Hanami was co-written by Denise Fernandes and Telmo Churro. Fernandes has said that she made Cape Verde and its people the central theme of her first feature film.

== Reception ==
=== Awards and nominations ===
In 2024, Hanami won awards including the Best Emerging Director Award and a Special Mention in the First Feature category at the Locarno Film Festival, and the Roger Ebert Award in the New Directors Competition at the Chicago International Film Festival.

In 2025, it won the Ingmar Bergman International Debut Award at the Göteborg Film Festival and the MAX Award for Best Feature Film in the national competition at the IndieLisboa International Film Festival.

=== Critical response ===
Teresa Vieira of Cineuropa described the film as “a profoundly moving story of longing and belonging” and praised its sound design and immersive atmosphere.

== Festival screenings ==
The film premiered in the Concorso Cineasti del Presente at the 77th Locarno Film Festival. It was subsequently screened in the Vanguard competition at the 2024 Vancouver International Film Festival, and in the First Feature competition at the 2024 BFI London Film Festival, and at the 2024 Chicago International Film Festival. In 2025, it was also shown at festivals including the Göteborg Film Festival, Solothurner Filmtage, and the New Horizons Film Festival in Wrocław.
