= Roya Sadat =

Afghan film producer and director (born 1983)

- رویا سادات
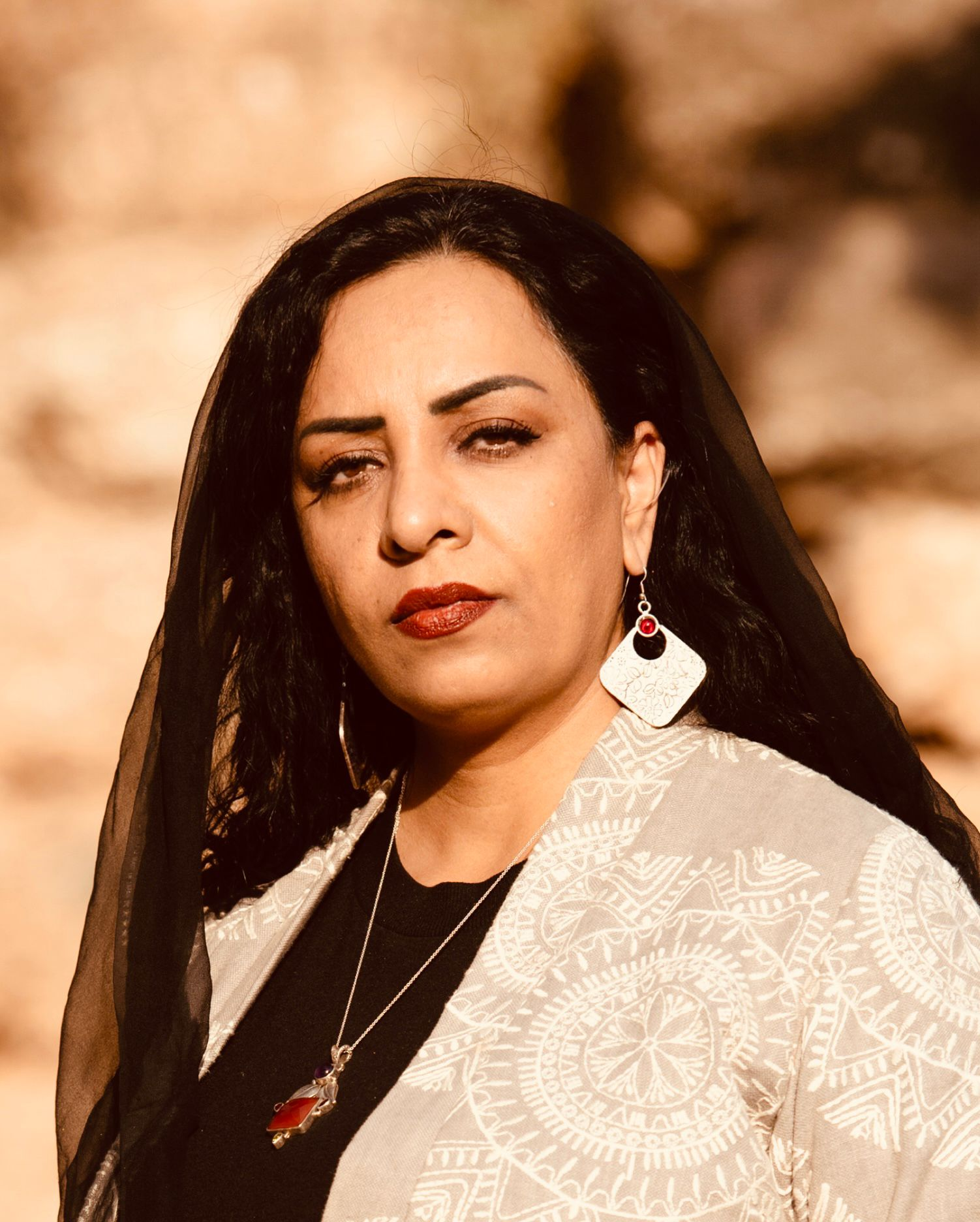
- Born: 1981 (age 44–45); Herat, Afghanistan
- Occupations: Film producer; director
- Known for: Movies Three Dots, Sima's Song and A letter to the President, establishing Roya Film House and International Women’s Film Festival Herat
- Website: royafilmhouse.com

Roya Sadat (Dari: رؤیا سادات;; born 1983) is an Afghan film producer and director. She was the first woman director in the history of Afghan cinema in the post-Taliban era, and ventured into making feature films and documentaries on the theme of injustice and restrictions imposed on women. Following the fall of the Taliban regime in the country, she made her debut feature film Three Dots. For this film she received six awards which included as best director and best film. Her film A Letter to the President received international awards. She and her sister, Alka Sadat, established the Roya Film House and under this banner produced more than 30 documentaries, feature films and TV series . She directed the opera of A Thousand Splendid Suns for the Seattle Opera and is in pre-production for her second feature film Forgotten History.

== Early life and education ==
Sadat was born in Herat, Afghanistan in 1983, during the Soviet invasion of Afghanistan. When she was very young, at the time the Taliban ruled in Afghanistan, women's education was a taboo. She and her seven sisters were educated at home by her mother. She was an autodidact who educated herself by reading books authored by Syd Field in Persian-translated versions. She was very passionate about producing films, but considering the restrictive atmosphere during the Taliban regime in her country she started writing scripts for plays and movies.

She studied law and political science at the Herat University and received a Bachelor of Arts degree in 2005. In 2006, she studied at the Asian Academy, Pusan for a Certificate Course in Film Direction. In 2006, she pursued her studies at the Asian Film Academy in South Korea under a scholarship.

== Career ==
In 1999, during the Taliban regime, she wrote and directed a play for a theater show for a group of Afghan women. After the Taliban regime came to an end, she started making films and her first feature film as a producer and director was Three Dots, known in Afghanistan as Se noughta, or Ellipsis. She made this film in less than two weeks, in a digital video format. The film, though not a quality product, gave an exposure to the western audience on the status of women in Afghanistan. Sadat discovered Gul Afroz for the lead role in this film even though Afroz had no formal training in acting. When Afroz was prevented by her husband and family members to act in the film she threatened to commit suicide, but she eventually acted in the film. This film received "rave reviews" around the world.

In 2003, she and her sister Alka Sadat established the first independent Afghan film company.

Three, Two, One related in illiteracy among women of her country which was produced by her sister Alka Sadat; this was slated for screening, in 2007, in the Afghan parliament to highlight the need for approving pending legislation on this subject. When the human rights commission gives the rights to the film, she was able to buy a small camera and editing system for her sister Alka Sadat then she starts to make the documentary film.

Her fiction film Taar wa Zakhma meaning Playing The Taar screened at the 7th IAWRT Asian Women's Film Festival 2011 deals with the tribulations of a 17-year-old girl married to a much older man. It was also screened at Kabul's First Autumn Human Rights Film Festival and received large audience appreciation. In her film productions she generally works as scriptwriter, director, and in many other roles including music.

She is credited with establishing the International Women's Film Festival in Afghanistan in 2013 as co-founder and president. Sadat was one of the jury members at the "Netpac award" for Malayalam films screened by the Malayalam Cinema, in 2014.

She was named a 2018 International Woman of Courage by the United States State Department. In 2021, she received the Kim Dae Jung Nobel Peace Film Award for her "effort to promote democracy, human rights, and peace through the art of motion pictures".

=== Television ===
In 2007, Roya worked on and directed the first Afghan TV Drama for Afghan Television Tolo TV, as well as producing a soap opera called the Secrets of This House with 50 episodes related to the current life of people of her country.

=== Opera ===
In March 2023, Sadat directed the premiere of the opera A Thousand Splendid Suns at the Seattle Opera.

== Personal life ==
She married in 2011. Her husband was a member of Kabul University's cinema faculty and joined Roya Film House as a writer and cinematographer.

Sadat was visited the United States in 2021 when the Taliban resumed power in Afghanistan. She has since remained in the U.S. with her husband and their two children.

== Filmography ==
- The Sharp Edge of Peace (2024)
- Sima's Song (2024)

== Bibliography ==
- Graham, Mark A. (2010). Afghanistan in the Cinema. University of Illinois Press. ISBN 978-0-252-03527-2.
