= The String =

2009 French film by Mehdi Ben Attia

- French: Le Fil
- Directed by: Mehdi Ben Attia
- Written by: Mehdi Ben Attia and Olivier Laneurie
- Starring: Claudia Cardinale
- Music by: original by Karol Beffa,
- Release dates: 29 August 2009 (Angoulême); 12 May 2010 (France)
- Running time: 93 minutes
- Country: France
- Languages: Arabic; French

The String (French: Le Fil) is a 2009 French film with French and Arabic dialogue, directed by Mehdi Ben Attia and made in Belgium and Tunisia. It stars Claudia Cardinale, Antonin Stahly and Salim Kechiouche. Notably, much of the film was shot in Tunisia, the country of birth of the film's director, Mehdi Ben Attia as well as that of Claudia Cardinale.

== Plot ==
The film is focused on the relationship of Malik with his mother Sara in the first weeks after Malik returns home from France to live with his recently widowed French-born mother on the family estate in the wealthy beachfront Tunis suburb, La Marsa. There Malik (Stahly) falls in love with Sara's young handyman, Bilal (Salim Kechiouche), who lives in a servant's bungalow on the estate, and who has also returned recently from a life in France. The French title, Le Fil, refers to Malik's neurotic anxiety, originating in childhood but continuing during the time of the story, manifest in the feeling he is attached at his back to a string that threatens to entangle and strangle him, an anxiety that expresses a troubled and deeply ambivalent relationship with his dominating mother, whom he cannot confront but upon whom he is also fearfully dependent. The title is also apparently a play on words, as the French title of the film, "le fil" (the thread), is closely akin in spelling to "le fils" (the son).

His mother and grandmother want Malik to marry and have children, and Malik has failed to confront his mother with his own homosexuality. During the course of the story, Malik agrees to marry his friend and cousin, Syrine, a lesbian who is planning a pregnancy by artificial insemination in order to raise a child with her lesbian lover, but who nevertheless wants the child to have a father and be like other children in the traditional society of Tunisia. Malik befriends Bilal, a 25 year old also recently returned from France to Tunisia, who does odd jobs and gardening for Sara and lives in the servants' quarters on the estate. Bilal, a sweet-natured dreamer, is distressed by the news that Malik is to marry and confronts Malik, who is devastated when Bilal tells him that he must leave, that he cannot continue as Malik's servant. The two make love, but Sara discovers the pair in bed together the next morning, forcing Malik to decide to try to form a relationship with Bilal; Sara begins her own journey of acceptance even as the two lovers depart on a road trip to the countryside where their intimacy and bond grows.

The film opens with a class of adults studying Arabic as a second language. While the teacher rehearses the students in repeating a simple phrase, Hakim, one of the students, whispers to his friend Bilal a question about why a person returns to his country, saying that he regrets every day his decision to come back to Tunisia from France.

== Cast ==
- Claudia Cardinale as Sara, Malik's mother
- Antonin Stahly as Malik, Sara's son, an architect
- Salim Kechiouche as Bilal, the handyman and gardener living in the servant's bungalow on Sara's property
- Rihab Mejri as Wafa, Sara's cook and servant, lives in a room in the servants' bungalow
- Driss Ramdi as Hakim, Bilal's friend, a fellow student learning Arabic as a second language
- Ramla Ayari as Syrine, Malik's cousin, friend and colleague at an architectural firm
- Abir Bennani as Leïla, the girlfriend of Syrine
- Lotfi Dziri as Abdelaziz, the father of Malik, recently deceased at the time the main story takes place, he's seen in flashbacks of Malik's and Sara's memories.
- Nejia Nemzi as Malik's paternal grandmother
- Ali Mrabet as Wassim, the homosexual cousin of Malik
- Hosni Khaled as Moncef, Syrine's father and a friend of Malik's parents
