= State of Silence =

2024 documentary by Santiago Maza

- Estado de silencio
- Directed by: Santiago Maza
- Written by: Santiago Maza
- Produced by: Abril López Carrillo
- Starring: Jesús Medina; Juan de Dios García Davish; María de Jesús Peters; Marcos Vizcarra
- Cinematography: Odei Zabalta
- Edited by: Sebastián Nuño; Jonás García
- Music by: Beak>
- Production company: La Corriente del Golfo
- Distributed by: Netflix
- Release date: 2024
- Running time: 83 minutes
- Country: Mexico
- Language: Spanish

State of Silence is a 2024 documentary directed by Santiago Maza. It chronicles the stories of Mexican journalists facing violence from organized crime and the government. It premiered at the Tribeca Festival and won the best feature award at the Santiago International Film Festival.

== Distribution ==
International rights were acquired by Begin Again Films on June 7, 2024.

On August 16, it was announced that Netflix acquired rights for distribution in the United States and Latin America. It was released on the platform on October 17.

== Critical reception ==
Deadline called the documentary "essential" and insightful into the phenomenon of "narco-político, or narco-politics—meant to describe a state of affairs where the lines between politicians and traffickers have been blurred."

Loud and Clear gave the documentary three and a half stars out of five, calling it "an eye-opening documentary for those who don’t know about the hardships Mexican journalists undergo."
