= Of Skin and Men =

2018 Franco-Tunisian romantic drama film

- French: L'amour des hommes
- Directed by: Mehdi Ben Attia
- Written by: Mehdi Ben Attia; Martin Drouot
- Produced by: David Mathieu-Mahias; Mani Mortazavi
- Starring: Hafsia Herzi; Raouf Ben Amor; Haythem Achour; Sondos Belhassen
- Cinematography: Antoine Parouty
- Edited by: Raphaël Lefèvre
- Music by: Karol Beffa
- Production companies: 4 à 4 Productions; Cinétéléfilms
- Distributed by: Epicentre Films; Hakka Distribution; MAD Solutions
- Release dates: October 2017 (Warsaw Film Festival); 21 February 2018 (France)
- Running time: 95 minutes
- Countries: Tunisia; France
- Languages: French; Arabic

Of Skin and Men (French: L'amour des hommes) is a 2017 Franco–Tunisian romantic drama film directed by Mehdi Ben Attia and co-produced by David Mathieu-Mahias and Mani Mortazavi. The film stars Hafsia Herzi with Raouf Ben Amor, Haythem Achour, and Sondos Belhassen in supporting roles. The film follows the tale of young Amel who tries to find some consolation in photography after the sudden death of her husband, by selecting strangers from the streets.

The film was shot in Tunis, Tunisia. The film made its premier on 21 February 2018 in France. The film received mixed reviews from critics. In 2017 at the Warsaw International Film Festival, the film was nominated for the Grand Prix award for the International Competition.

== Cast ==
- Hafsia Herzi as Amel
- Raouf Ben Amor as Taïeb, the father-in-law
- Haythem Achour as Sami, Amel's intellectual lover
- Sondos Belhassen as Souad, Taïeb's wife
- Karim Ait M'Hand as Rabah, a young plebeian photographed by Amel
- Oumayma Ben Hafsia as Kaouther
- Rochdi Belgasmi as Aïssa, Kaouther's boyfriend
- Abdelhamid Nawara as Mouldi, hairdresser photographed by Amel
- Nasreddine Ben Maati as Kaïs
- Férid Boughedir as Moustapha
- Nawel Ben Kraiem as Lilia
- Ghanem Zrelli
- Samia Rhaiem
- Djaouida Vaughan
