= Denise Fernandes =

Portuguese director

- Born: 1990 (age 35–36); Lisbon, Portugal
- Notable work: Hanami

Denise Fernandes is a Cape Verdean director. Her 2024 debut feature film Hanami screened at numerous festivals, like the Melbourne International Film Festival and the Red Sea International Film Festival, and won her an award for best director at the Locarno Film Festival.

== Early life ==
Fernandes was born in Lisbon, Portugal and grew up in Switzerland. Her parents are from Cape Verde. In her childhood, Fernandes spent a lot of time reading and, at the age of 12, attempted to write a novel, though she quickly lost interest in writing and was drawn toward cinema, or specifically the idea of making a story "materialize."

== Career ==
Fernandes' short film, Nha Mila, premiered at the Locarno Film Festival and was nominated for a European Film Award. It also screened at over 40 festivals around the world.

Her debut feature film, Hanami, premiered in the Cineasti del Presente Competition, won the Best Emerging Director Award, and a special mention in the First Feature Awards, at Locarno Film Festival.
