= Black Gold (2011 Qatari film) =

2011 historical war film

- Theatrical release poster
- Directed by: Jean-Jacques Annaud
- Screenplay by: Jean-Jacques Annaud; Menno Meyjes; Alain Godard
- Based on: South of the Heart: A Novel of Modern Arabia by Hans Ruesch
- Produced by: Tarak Ben Ammar
- Starring: Tahar Rahim; Mark Strong; Antonio Banderas; Freida Pinto; Riz Ahmed; Corey Johnson; Liya Kebede
- Cinematography: Jean-Marie Dreujou
- Edited by: Hervé Schneid
- Music by: James Horner
- Production companies: Quinta Communications; Prima TV; Carthago Films; France 2 Cinéma
- Distributed by: Warner Bros. Pictures (France and Qatar); Eagle Pictures (Italy)
- Release dates: 25 October 2011 (DTFF); 23 November 2011 (France)
- Running time: 130 minutes
- Countries: France; Italy; Qatar
- Language: English
- Budget: €38.5–40 million
- Box office: $5.5 million

Black Gold (also known as Day of the Falcon and Or noir) is a 2011 epic historical war film, based on Hans Ruesch's 1957 novel South of the Heart: A Novel of Modern Arabia (also known as The Great Thirst and The Arab). It was directed by Jean-Jacques Annaud, produced by Tarak Ben Ammar and co-produced by Doha Film Institute. The film stars Tahar Rahim, Antonio Banderas, Freida Pinto, Mark Strong and Riz Ahmed.

The film received negative reviews and grossed $5.5 million on a budget of €40 million, making it a box-office bomb.

== Plot ==
In the early 20th century, Emir Nesib (Antonio Banderas) and Sultan Amar (Mark Strong) end their border war over "The Yellow Belt." Nesib wins, taking Amar's sons as hostages. Ten years later, Thurkettle, an American geologist, discovers oil in the Yellow Belt, violating the peace pact. Nesib modernizes his kingdom but faces opposition from tribes. Saleh, Amar's son, tries to convince Amar to allow oil extraction but is killed.

Desperate to maintain oil revenues, Nesib marries Auda to his daughter Leyla (Freida Pinto), dissolving the pact with Amar. Auda, sent to persuade Amar, discovers Amar's resistance to exploiting the Yellow Belt. Amar plans to attack Nesib's city, Hobeika, using prisoners as decoys. Auda leads the decoy army, but Nesib's forces overpower them. Auda's plan to lead prisoners to the sea fails, leading them to face a slaver tribe. Auda defeats the tribe, earning the loyalty of other tribes.

Auda is mistakenly shot but revives during funeral rites. Tribals believe he is a prophesied leader. Auda, vowing to "overturn the chessboard," unites tribes against Nesib. Amar agrees to Auda's terms but is killed by the Beni Sirri sheikh. Auda's army, angered, attacks Hobeika, overwhelming Nesib's forces. Auda becomes ruler of both kingdoms through his marriage to Leyla.

In the aftermath Nesib abdicates in favor of Leyla. Auda confronts Nesib, sparing him and sending him to Houston to protect their interests. The film concludes with Auda, now ruler, choosing his people over foreign interests and spending time with his pregnant wife.

== Cast ==
- Tahar Rahim as Prince Auda
- Antonio Banderas as Emir Nesib
- Mark Strong as Sultan Amar
- Freida Pinto as Princess Leyla
- Jan Uddin as Ibn Idriss
- Riz Ahmed as Dr Ali
- Corey Johnson as Thurkettle
- Liya Kebede as Aicha
- Lotfi Dziri as Sheikh of Beni Sirri tribe
- Hichem Rostom as Nesib Colonel
- Mostafa Gaafar as Khoz Ahmed
- Jamal Awar as Companion Khoz Ahmed
- Driss Roukhe as Magroof
- Eriq Ebouaney as Hassan Dakhil
- Akin Gazi as Saleh
- Abdelmajid Lakhal as Old Imam

== Reception ==
Black Gold was panned by critics. On Rotten Tomatoes, the film holds a rating of 11% based on 27 reviews, with an average score of 4 out of 10. While there was praise for its ambitious scope, production values and action, the film was criticized for being tedious and slow; Strong and Banderas received significant criticism for their performances as Arabic characters. "Touted as the Arab breakthrough into the international cinema arena, Black Gold pits Mark Strong and Antonio Banderas against each other as warring emirs torn between the traditional ways and modern temptations. But despite its honourable intentions, Black Gold hits the ground with a terrible clunking thud, its broken-English dialogue squeezing the life out of it practically from the off," The Guardian's Andrew Pulver wrote in his analysis.
