= Hobal (film) =

- Directed by: Abdulaziz Alshlahei
- Written by: Mufarrij Almajfel
- Produced by: Sharif Almajali
- Starring: Meshal Almutairi; Mila Alzahrani; Ibrahim Al-Hsawi; Motreb Fawaz; Abdulrahman Abdullah; Drian Aldrian; Hamdy Alfredi; Reem Fahad; Noura Alhamedi
- Cinematography: Mahmoud Youssef
- Edited by: Ihab Gohar
- Music by: Suad Bushnaq
- Production companies: Shaf Studios; Film Clinic; Peninsula Pictures Group
- Distributed by: Qanwat Group
- Release dates: 7 December 2024 (Red Sea International Film Festival); 2 January 2025 (Saudi Arabia)
- Running time: 116 minutes (Note: Sources vary on the film's runtime. The Red Sea International Film Festival list the runtime as 111 minutes, while the British Board of Film Classification lists it as 116 minutes. However, the Irish Film Classification Office lists it as 156 minutes.)
- Country: Saudi Arabia
- Language: Arabic

Hobal is a 2024 Saudi Arabian drama film directed by Abdulaziz Alshlahei. The film is set in the 1990s in Saudi Arabia as its plot follows a Saudi family who are following instructions from their grandfather to remain confined in the desert.

The film had its world premiere at the Red Sea International Film Festival on 7 December 2024, and was released theatrically in Saudi Arabia on 2 January 2025.

== Cast ==
- Meshal Almutairi as Shanar
- Mila Alzahrani as Sara
- Ibrahim Al-Hsawi as Liyam
- Motreb Fawaz
- Abdulrahman Abdullah as Nahar
- Drian Aldrian
- Hamdy Alfredi as Battal
- Reem Fahad as Seita
- Noura Alhamedi

== Production ==
Hobal was produced by Shaf Studios, alongside Mohamed Hefzi's Film Clinic and Peninsula Pictures Group. The film was produced by Sharif Almajali with Abdulaziz Alshlahei, Mofarij Almujfel, Mohamed Al Turki, and Riyadh Alzamil serving as executive producers. The film was supported by the Daw’ Film Competition, the Saudi Film Commission, the Quality of Life Program, and NEOM.

Filming began on Bajdah Studios and the Red Sea coast in Tabuk in September 2023. The crew has been thinking about locations on the film since 2018, before deciding on NEOM, and specifically Bajdah.

== Release ==
Hobal had its world premiere at the Red Sea International Film Festival on 7 December 2024. The film was released theatrically in Saudi Arabia on 2 January 2025 though Qanwat Group. Following the commercial success of the film in Saudi Arabia and the Gulf, the film will release in the United States, the United Kingdom, Canada, Ireland, and Germany in the first phase, and the rest of the other countries in the second phase. The film was released in the United Kingdom and Ireland on 10 October 2025.
