= Doria Achour =

French-Tunisian film director and actress

- Born: March 1, 1991 (age 35)
- Education: Paris-Sorbonne University; Paris Diderot University
- Occupations: Film director, actress
- Years active: 2002-present

Doria Achour (born 1 March 1991) is a French-Tunisian film director and actress.

== Biography ==
Achour is the daughter of the Tunisian film director and actor Lotfi Achour and a Russian mother who is a playwright. Her older brother is a playwright, and she has a younger brother. Achour grew up in the 12th arrondissement of Paris in an atmosphere that was "an artistic milieu, but not bourgeois." As a child, she accompanied her parents during their rehearsals and at their performances.

In 2002, Achour portrayed the daughter of Sergi López in Les Femmes... ou les enfants d'abord..., directed by Manuel Poirier. Her mother helped her find the role, spotting an advertisement in Libération. After her first role, Achor took acting lessons for a year at Théâtre des Déchargeurs. She had several secondary roles in a few films, such as L'enemi naturel and L'École pour tous. To focus on her studies, Achour paused her film career for several years. Achour received a degree in literature from Paris-Sorbonne University and later obtained a master's degree in cinema from Paris Diderot University.

In 2012, Achour played the young Yasmeen in La fille publique, and her character was inspired by the early life of Cheyenne Carron. In 2013, Achour directed her first short film, Laisse-moi finir, on the subject of life in Tunisia after the Arab Spring when the Islamists took control. It was screened in several festivals and received the Audience Award in the Made in Med short film competition of June 2014. Her performance in La fille publique drew the attention of the director Sylvie Ohayon, who cast the young actress as Stephanie in the 2014 film Papa Was Not a Rolling Stone. In 2016, Achour starred in her first Arabic film, Burning Hope. She directed the short film Le reste est l'œuvre de l'homme, which won the Jury Prize at the 2017 Sundance Film Festival. She played Leila, the missing daughter, in Naidra Ayadi's 2018 film Ma fille.

Achur is an agnostic. She is a fan of medieval literature.

== Partial filmography ==
- 2002: Les Femmes... ou les enfants d'abord...
- 2004: L'enemi naturel
- 2005: L'Annulaire
- 2006: L'École pour tous
- 2012: La fille publique
- 2013: Laisse-moi finir (short film, director)
- 2014: Papa Was Not a Rolling Stone
- 2014: Demain dès l'aube (short film, director)
- 2016: Burning Hope
- 2017: Le reste est l'œuvre de l'homme (director)
- 2018: Ma fille
- 2024: Red Path (Les Enfants rouges) - writer
