= Hamzah Jamjoom =

Saudi Arabian director

- Born: Jeddah, Saudi Arabia
- Education: DePaul University (MFA)
- Occupation: Director

Hamzah Jamjoom is a Saudi Arabian director. He has directed films like How I Got There and Rupture, both of which won the award for best Saudi film at the Red Sea International Film Festival in their respective years.

== Early life ==
Jamjoom was born in Jeddah, Saudi Arabia. He graduated from DePaul University with a Master of Fine Arts in film.

== Career ==
Jamjoom co-founded the production company Digital Hydra.

Jamjoom's 2021 film, Rupture, debuted at the Red Sea International Film Festival, where it won an award for best Saudi film. In 2022, his film How I Got There won the same award.

In December 2025, it was announced that Jamjoom would work with The Boys co-creator on a superhero series called Crestar and the Knight Stallion.
