= Mehdi Ben Attia =

Tunisian film director, screenwriter and actor

- Born: 7 August 1968; Tunis, Tunisia
- Occupations: Film director, screenwriter and actor
- Writing career
- Notable works: movies En face (1999), The String (Le Fil, 2009), and Of Skin and Men (L'Amour des hommes, 2017).

Mehdi Ben Attia is a Tunisian film director, screenwriter and actor.

== Biography ==
Born at Tunis in 1968, Ben Attia studied at Lycée Gustave Flaubert in La Marsa, Tunisia, and in 1993 obtained a French Diplôme d'études approfondies advanced degree in sociology at Sorbonne University in Paris. He then turned to screenwriting, often in collaboration, and direction of films and television series for French channels, for instance H (for Canal Plus), Sami (three episodes, M6), and Groupe Flag (two episodes, France 2). His first feature film Le Fil (The String, a homosexual love story) starred Claudia Cardinale and Salim Kechiouche. He also acted in four films.

== Filmography ==
Ben Attia's films include:

Year	Film	Genre	Role	Stars	Duration (min)
1999	En face	Romantic short	Codirector and coscreenwriter with Zina Modiano and Kahéna Attia	Amel Smaoui, Mohamed Ali Cherif, and Néjia Ouji	27 m
2001	Loin by André Téchiné	Drama feature	Coscreenwriter with André Téchiné and others	Azabal Lubna, Brakni Rachida, and Morel Gaël	120 m
2005	La Vie privée by Zina Modiano. Plot based on Henry James's 1892 short story The Private Life.	Drama feature	Actor and coscreenwriter with Zina Modiano	Ouassini Embarek and Marie Modiano	75 m
2009	Sweet home (Bent eddar) by Fatma Chérif	Portrait documentary	Coscreenwriter with Fatma Chérif	Thouraya	50 m
2009	Le Fil (The String)	Homosexual romance feature	Director and coscreenwriter with Olivier Laneurie	Claudia Cardinale, Salim Kechiouche and Antonin Stahly (Vishwanadan)	93 m
2011	Les impardonables (Unforgivable) by André Téchiné adapted from the 2009 novel by Philippe Djian	Thriller feature	Coscreenwriter with André Téchiné and Philippe Djian	Carole Bouquet, André Dussollier and Mélanie Thierry	111 m
2012	Je ne suis pas mort (I'm not dead)	Drama feature	Director and screenwriter	Mehdi Dehbi, Maria de Medeiros and Emmanuel Salinger	99 m
2017	L'Amour des hommes (Of Skin and Men)	Drama feature	Director and coscreenwriter with Martin Drouot	Raouf Ben Amor and Hafsia Herzi	105 m

== Awards ==
Ben Attia's films obtained two prizes and three nominations, such as:

Film	Festival	Award
En face (1999)	Festival International du Film Francophone de Namur	2000 Winner Best Short Film of the South, shared with Zina Modiano
The String (2009)	Frameline Film Festival (former San Francisco International Lesbian and Gay Film Festival)	2010 Winner Audience Award Best Feature
