= Fadhel Jaziri =

Tunisian actor and film director (1948–2025)

- الفاضل الجزيري
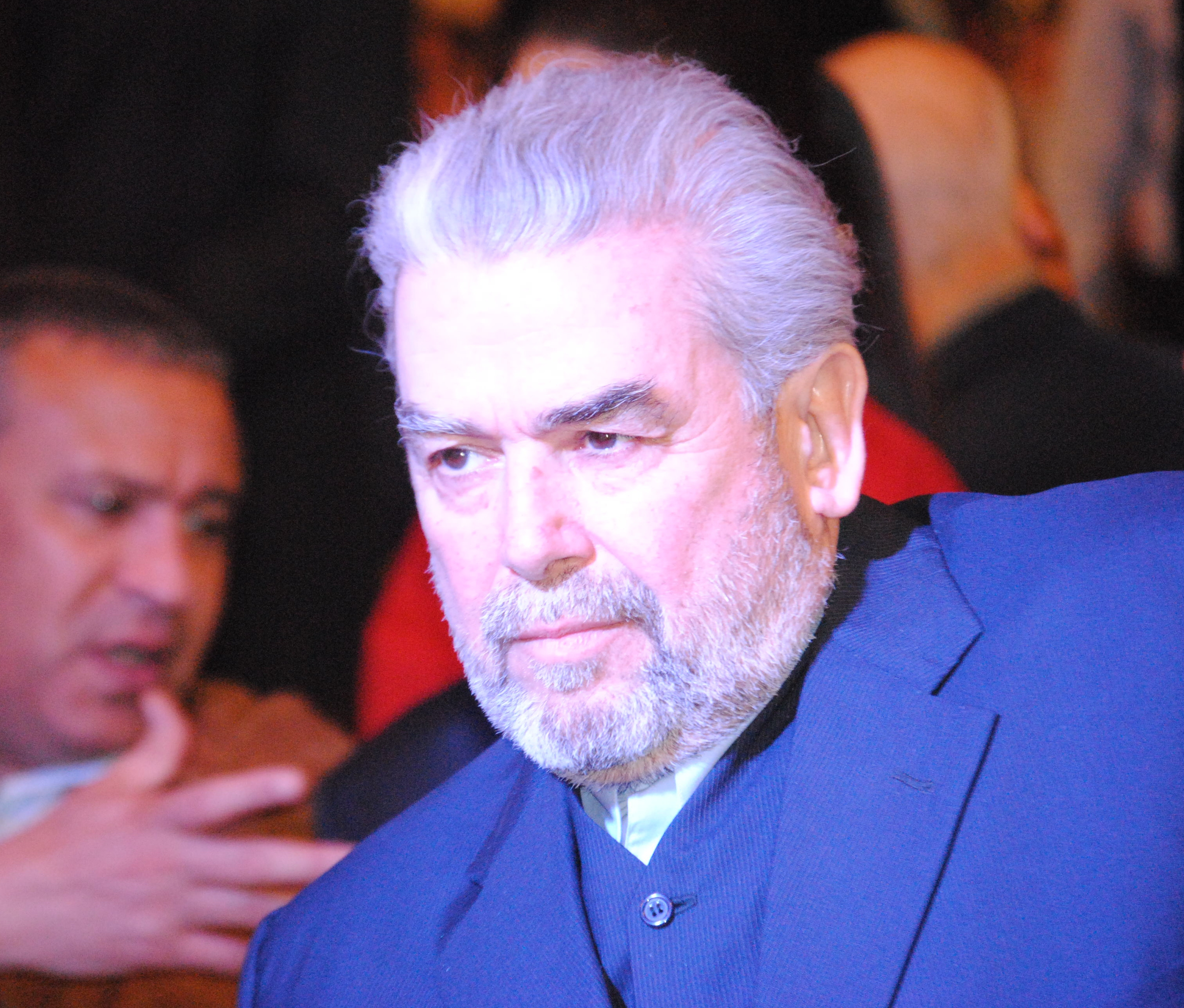
- Born: 1948; Tunis, French protectorate of Tunisia
- Died: 11 August 2025 (aged 77)
- Occupations: Actor, film director

Fadhel Jaziri (Arabic: الفاضل الجزيري, romanized: Al-Fadhel Al-Jaziri; 1948 – 11 August 2025) was a Tunisian actor and film director.

== Life and career ==
Fadhel Jaziri was born in the medina of the Tunisian capital in 1948 to an upper-middle-class family who used to run a fez-making business. In addition to other businesses related to the hospitality industry, Jaziri's father had a bookshop in the neighborhood of Bab Souika. Young Fadhel thus had the opportunity to meet and be influenced by the men of arts, theatre and politics that his father often had the pleasure of receiving. Fadhel Jaziri attended the modern Sadiki College where he had a freshman's experience with a student theatrical group which also included the Tunisian actor Raouf Ben Amor. During the 1968 events, Jaziri was very active and participated in the demonstrations taking place in Tunisian campuses where he even delivered speeches. His young man's rage against repression and political corruption led to his dismissal from the Faculty of Arts before finishing his diploma in philosophy. Fortunately for him, he soon received a scholarship to study in the British capital along with a number of other promising young Tunisians.

Jaziri's very first experience on stage was at the Ibn Khaldoun Palace of Culture in Tunis with actor Ali Ben Ayed when he had to play a walk-on part in Murad III. However, upon his return from London in 1972, Jaziri cofounded the theatrical group of Gafsa known in French as “Théâtre du Sud”. The team included Tunisia's most recognized theatre stars such as Fadhel Jaibi, Raja Farhat, Jalila Baccar and Mohamed Driss. In Tunis, Jaziri and Jaibi later launched the “Nouveau Théâtre de Tunis” and produced a number of plays that would become major classics of Tunisian drama.

In 2007, Fadhel Jaziri directed Thalatun (meaning 30 in Arabic), a movie received with much praise and which depicts Tunisian life in the 1930s. The main heroes of Jaziri's opus are three immanent figures that have a very special place in Tunisian history and culture. They are the social reformer Tahar Haddad, the trade-unionist Mohamed Ali El Hammi and the poet Abu Al Kacem Chebbi.

He directed the musical shows known in Arabic as Nouba and Hadhra.

A member of the Economic and Social Commission of Nidaa Tounes, he announced his resignation from the party on 15 January 2016.

== Death ==
Jaziri died after a long illness on 11 August 2025, at the age of 77.
