= Elyes Baccar =

Tunisian film director

- Born: 1971 (age 54–55); Tunis, Tunisia
- Occupations: Director; writer; producer
- Years active: 1996–present

Elyes Baccar is a Tunisian feature film and documentary director, writer and producer. He is best known for his work on the films She & He, Lost in Tunisia and Tunis by Night.

== Life and career ==
Elyes was born in Tunis, Tunisia. He studied Directing at the French CLCF in Paris. He also attended FEMIS training program in Paris and the cultural manager program at Goethe-Institut in Berlin. He started his career as an assistant director to films such as Star Wars in Tunisia shooting.

In 2006, Elyes directed his first feature film She & he (Elle et Lui), premiered in international film festivals. In 2011, his first feature documentary Rouge Parole, about the Tunisian revolution. His second feature film Tunis by night (Tunis Ellil), premiered at the Cairo International Film Festival in 2017. He was guest speaker at Columbia University, Goethe-Institut and the German Commission for UNESCO.

== Filmography ==
Year	Film	Director	Writer	Producer	Note
2006	She & He (Elle et lui)	Yes	Yes		Feature film
2011	Rouge Parole	Yes	Yes	Yes	Documentary
2016	Lost in Tunisia	Yes	Yes	Yes	Documentary
2017	Tunis by Night (Tunis Ellil)	Yes	Yes		Feature film
