= Selma Baccar =

Tunisian film director and politician

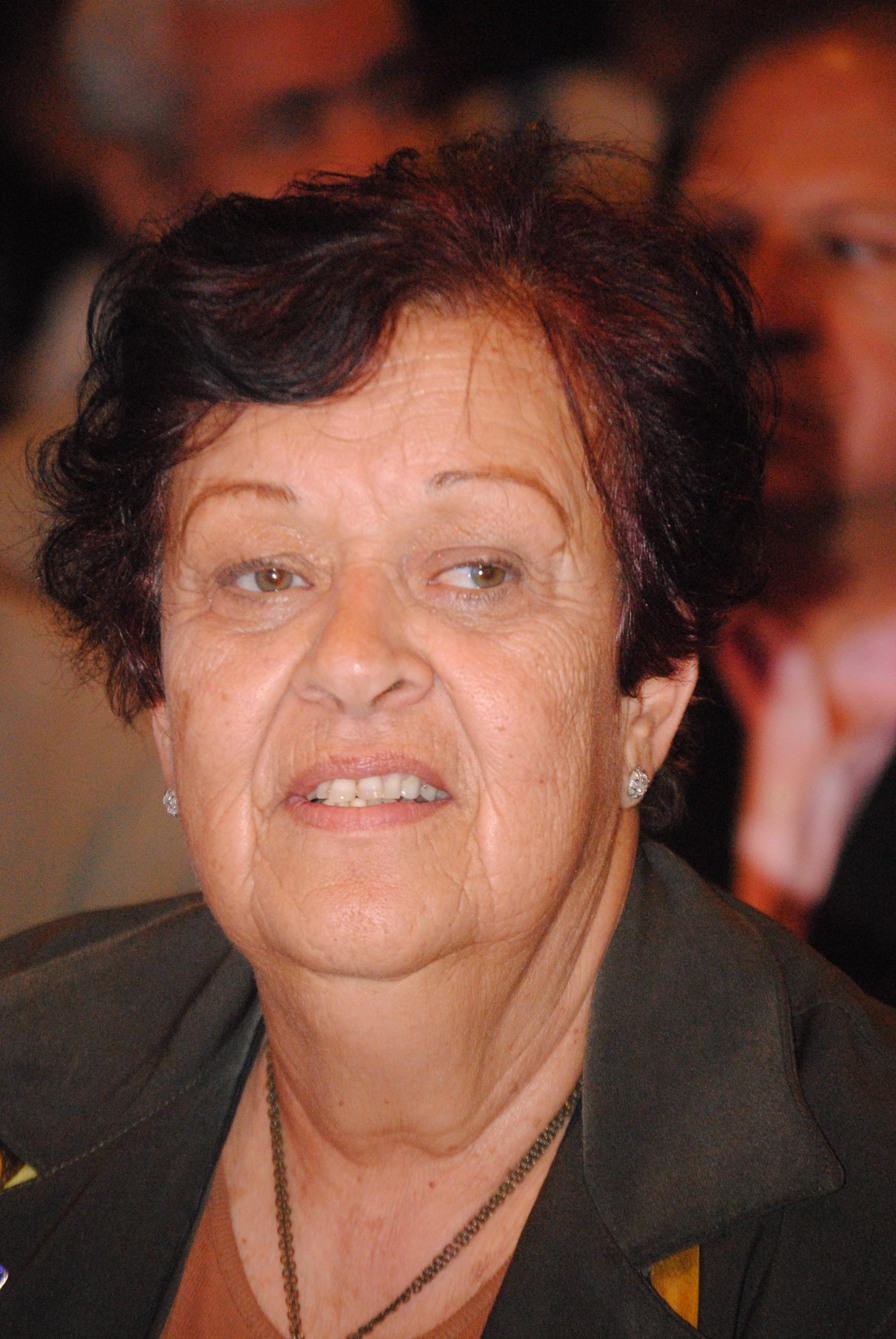
- Born: December 15, 1945 (age 80); Tunis
- Occupations: filmmaker, producer and politician.
- Notable work: Fatma 75 (1976), El niño de la luna (1989), Khochkhach (2006) and El Jaida (2017).

Selma Baccar or Salma Baccar (born December 15, 1945) is a Tunisian filmmaker, producer and politician. She is considered the first woman to make a featured length film in Tunis. Baccar is known for creating manifestos through her films, centered around women's rights in Tunisia.

== Early life ==
Selma Baccar was born on December 15, 1945, in Tunis. Her family moved to Hammam-Lif when she was seven years old. Baccar was raised as a Muslim by her parents and has done the pilgrimage to Mecca with her family twice; however, Baccar identifies as agnostic. She began to study psychology in 1966 to 1968 in Lausanne, Switzerland. She relocated after 2 years to study film in Paris at Institut Français de Cinéma. She then became a member of the Tunisian Federation of Amateur Filmmakers (Fédération Tunisienne des Cinéastes Amateurs, FTCA), where she worked as an assistant director for a Tunisian television series.

== Career ==
At the age of 21, Baccar began to create short films in 1966, along with other women at the Hammam-Lif amateur film club. Her films revolve around women's issues and rights in Tunisia. Her first short film, made in 1966, was a black and white film called L'Eveil, that tackled women's liberation in Tunisia. L'Eveil later received accolades. Baccar directed her first full-length feature film in 1975 titled Fatma 75, viewed as a "pioneer film" in Tunisia. This was the first full-length feature film directed by a woman and characterised as "a feminist essay film about women's roles in Tunisia." The film uses a didactic style film that addresses feminism in Tunisia and was banned for several years, due to censorship issues in multiple scenes, by the Tunisian Ministry of information, and could not be viewed in commercial movie theatres.

Her second full length film, The Fire Dance (1994), was a biopic of a famous Tunisian singer and dancer, Habiba Msika. Flowers of Oblivion told the story of Zakia, an opium addict in a psychiatric hospital in Vichy-ruled Tunisia in the 1940s. The director owns her own production company under Intermedia Productions alongside other notable female directors, to make films and commercials. Baccar also has produced a number of short films.

Baccar's activism for Tunisian women's rights led her to an active political career and she became a member of the Al Massar political party. In October 2011, Baccar was elected a member to the Constituent Assembly In 2014, she was promoted from vice-president to president of the parliamentary group of Democrats in Tunisia, "the first and only woman to chair a parliamentary bloc."

== Filmography ==
=== Feature films ===
- 1976: Fatma 75
- 1994: Habiba M’sika/La Danse du feu/The Dance of Fire
- 2006: Knochkhach/La Fleur de l'oubli/The Flower of Oblivion
- 2017: El Jaida

=== Other Films ===
- 1966: L'Eveil (Director, short film)
- 1985: De la toison au fil d'or/The Golden Fleece (director, short film)
- 1989: Moon Child (Producer, short film)
- 2010: Baydha (Tabou) (Producer)
- 2016: Peluche (Producer)

=== Television series ===
- 1996: Le Secret des métiers
- 1997: Femmes dans notre mémoire
- 2002: Farhat Lamor (Joie d'une vie)
- 2005: Chara Al Hobb
- 2006: Nwassi w Ateb
- 2006: Assrar âailya
- 2007: Chaâbane fi Ramadhane
- 2007: Kamanjet Sallema
- 2007: Layali el bidh

== Awards ==
- 1968 - L'Eveil (1966) received an award at the Festival International du Film Amateur de Kélibia and Sfax International Mediterranean Film Festival.
- 1979 - Fatma 75 (1976) won the Gold medal at the International Filmfestival Mannheim-Heidelberg.
- 1990 - El niño de la luna (1989) was nominated at the Goya Awards for Best Production Manager Award (Mejor Dirección de Producción).

== Honours ==
- 2014 : Knight of the National Order of Merit of Tunisia
- 2015 : Officer of the Order of the Republic of Tunisia
