= 2023 Cinéfest Sudbury International Film Festival =

Film festival in Ontario, Canada

- Opening film: Rose by Niels Arden Oplev
- Closing film: Humanist Vampire Seeking Consenting Suicidal Person by Ariane Louis-Seize
- Location: Sudbury, Ontario, Canada
- Founded: 1989
- Festival date: September 16–24, 2023
- Website: cinefest.com

Cinéfest Sudbury International Film Festival
- 2024 2022

The 2023 edition of the Cinéfest Sudbury International Film Festival, the 35th edition in the event's history, took place from September 16 to 24, 2023 in Sudbury, Ontario, Canada.

The 2023 festival returned to a fully in-person model, following the partially-online hybrid festivals that took place from 2020 to 2022 during the COVID-19 pandemic. Following reduced attendance during the pandemic, the 2023 festival saw such a renewed surge of audience interest that its website briefly crashed on the Thursday before the festival opening.

== Awards ==
Award winners were announced on September 28.

Award	Film	Filmmaker
Audience Choice, Feature Film	The Old Oak	Ken Loach
Audience Choice, Feature Film Runner-Up	Anatomy of a Fall (Anatomie d'un chute)	Justine Triet
Audience Choice, Documentary	Mr. Dressup: The Magic of Make-Believe	Robert McCallum
Audience Choice, Documentary Runner Up	Swan Song	Chelsea McMullan
Audience Choice, Short Film	Death to the Bikini! (À mort le bikini!)	Justine Gauthier
Audience Choice, Short Film Runner Up	Lingering Pieces	Jacqueline Lamb
Outstanding Canadian Feature	Seagrass	Meredith Hama-Brown
Outstanding International Feature	The Royal Hotel	Kitty Green
Outstanding Female-Led Feature Film	Smoke Sauna Sisterhood (Savvusanna sõsarad)	Anna Hints
Cinema Indigenized Outstanding Talent	Aitamaako'tamisskapi Natosi: Before the Sun	Banchi Hanuse
French-Language Feature Film	Humanist Vampire Seeking Consenting Suicidal Person (Vampire humaniste cherche suicidaire consentant)	Ariane Louis-Seize
Inspiring Voices and Perspectives	Close to You	Dominic Savage
Outstanding Short Film	I Promise You Paradise (Paradis)	Morad Mostafa
Outstanding Animated Short Film	Return to Hairy Hill (Retour à Hairy Hill)	Daniel Gies
Outstanding Northern Ontario Short Film	Walter's Room	Austin Lindsay

== Official selections ==
=== Gala Presentations ===
English title	Original title	Director(s)	Production country
The Boy in the Woods		Rebecca Snow	Canada
La Chimera		Alice Rohrwacher	Italy, France, Switzerland
Close to You		Dominic Savage	Canada, United Kingdom
Humanist Vampire Seeking Consenting Suicidal Person	Vampire humaniste cherche suicidaire consentant	Ariane Louis-Seize	Canada
My Mother's Men	Les Hommes de ma mère	Anik Jean	Canada
The Old Oak		Ken Loach	United Kingdom, France, Belgium
Swan Song		Chelsea McMullan	Canada
Sweetland		Christian Sparkes	Canada
The Unlikely Pilgrimage of Harold Fry		Hettie Macdonald	United Kingdom

=== Special Presentations ===
English title	Original title	Director(s)	Production country
Anatomy of a Fall	Anatomie d'un chute	Justine Triet	France
Days of Happiness	Les Jours heureux	Chloé Robichaud	Canada
A Difficult Year	Une année difficile	Éric Toledano and Olivier Nakache	France
Fitting In		Molly McGlynn	Canada
The King Tide		Christian Sparkes	Canada
Monster	Kaibutsu	Hirokazu Kore-eda	Japan
Mr. Dressup: The Magic of Make-Believe		Robert McCallum	Canada
My Animal		Jacqueline Castel	Canada
One Summer	Le Temps d'un été	Louise Archambault	Canada
Rose		Niels Arden Oplev	Denmark, France
Perfect Days		Wim Wenders	Japan, Germany
The Pot-au-Feu	La Passion de Dodin Bouffant	Tran Anh Hung	France
The Promised Land	Bastarden	Nikolaj Arcel	Denmark
The Royal Hotel		Kitty Green	Australia
Seven Veils		Atom Egoyan	Canada
The Teachers' Lounge	Das Lehrerzimmer	Ilker Çatak	Germany
They Shot the Piano Player	Dispararon al pianista	Fernando Trueba, Javier Mariscal	Spain, France, Netherlands
Warrior Strong		Shane Belcourt	Canada

=== Features Canada ===
English title	Original title	Director(s)	Production country
Backspot		D. W. Waterson	Canada
Better Days		Joan Carr-Wiggin	Canada
Daniel's Gotta Die		Jeremy Lalonde	Canada
Echo to Delta	Écho à Delta	Patrick Boivin	Canada
Hailey Rose		Sandi Somers	Canada
I Used to Be Funny		Ally Pankiw	Canada
I Will Not Starve	Non morirò di fame	Umberto Spinazzola	Canada, Italy
Little Jesus	Petit Jésus	Julien Rigoulot	Canada, France
Niagara		Guillaume Lambert	Canada
Orah		Lonzo Nzekwe	Canada
A Respectable Woman	Une femme respectable	Bernard Émond	Canada
Richelieu		Pier-Philippe Chevigny	Canada
Rodeo	Rodéo	Joëlle Desjardins Paquette	Canada
Seagrass		Meredith Hama-Brown	Canada
Suze		Dane Clark, Linsey Stewart	Canada
Who's Yer Father?		Jeremy Larter	Canada

=== Documentaries ===
English title	Original title	Director(s)	Production country
Adaptation		Jake Thomas	Canada
Another Body		Sophie Compton, Reuben Hamlyn	United States
The Last Stop: Canada's Lost Locomotive		Kaio Kathriner	Canada
The Lebanese Burger Mafia		Omar Mouallem	Canada
On the Adamant	Sur l'Adamant	Nicolas Philibert	France, Japan
Rule of Two Walls		David Gutnik	Ukraine
Smoke Sauna Sisterhood	Savvusanna sõsarad	Anna Hints	Estonia, France, Iceland
Subterranean		Francois-Xavier "Fix" De Ruydts	Canada
Total Trust		Jialing Zhang	Germany, Netherlands
We Dare to Dream		Waad al-Kateab	United Kingdom

=== World Cinema ===
English title	Original title	Director(s)	Production country
Aliens Abducted My Parents and Now I Feel Kinda Left Out		Jake Van Wagoner	United States
The Book of Solutions	Le Livre des solutions	Michel Gondry	France
The Crossing	La Traversée	Florence Miailhe	France, Czech Republic, Germany
Fallen Leaves	Kuolleet lehdet	Aki Kaurismäki	Finland, Germany
Fathers and Mothers	Fædre & mødre	Paprika Steen	Denmark
How to Have Sex		Molly Manning Walker	United Kingdom
Kidnapped	Rapito	Marco Bellocchio	Italy, France, Germany
Minore		Konstantinos Koutsoliotas	United Kingdom, Greece
The Persian Version		Maryam Keshavarz	United States
Raging Grace		Paris Zarcilla	United Kingdom
Robot Dreams		Pablo Berger	Spain, France
Sleep	잠	Jason Yu	South Korea
Sometimes I Think About Dying		Rachel Lambert	United States
Vincent Must Die	Vincent doit mourir	Stéphan Castang	France, Belgium

=== In Full View: Crisis, Conflict, Conscience ===
English title	Original title	Director(s)	Production country
Irena's Vow		Louise Archambault	Canada
Praying for Armageddon		Tonje Hessen Schei, Michael Rowley	Norway
Red Rooms	Les Chambres rouges	Pascal Plante	Canada

=== Cinema Indigenized (Nishnaabek Dbaajmawaat) ===
English title	Original title	Director(s)	Production country
Aitamaako'tamisskapi Natosi: Before the Sun		Banchi Hanuse	Canada
Broken Angel	MaaShwaKan MaNiTo	Jules Arita Koostachin	Canada
Café Daughter		Shelley Niro	Canada
Frybread Face and Me		Billy Luther	United States
Hey, Viktor!		Cody Lightning	Canada

=== Cinema 9 Prime Time ===
English title	Original title	Director(s)	Production country
Daughter of the Sun		Ryan Ward	Canada
Leilani's Fortune		Loveleen Kaur	Canada
Satan Wants You		Sean Horlor, Steve J. Adams	Canada

=== Late Night Frights ===
English title	Original title	Director(s)	Production country
Purgatory Jack		Brett M. Butler, Jason G. Butler	Canada

=== Regular short film program ===
English title	Original title	Director(s)	Production country
Aves		Eli Snyder	United States
Awakening: The First Day		Jos Diaz Contreras, Santiago Carrasquilla	United States
Bang Bang		Piotr Skowronski	Canada
Boat People		Thao Lam, Kjell Boersma	Canada
Death to the Bikini!	À mort le bikini!	Justine Gauthier	Canada
Echoes	Échos	Sophie B. Jacque	Canada
The Girl with the Red Beret		Janet Perlman	Canada
Harvey		Janice Nadeau	Canada
Hello to Me in 100 Years		Wu-Ching Chang	Taiwan
I Promise You Paradise	Paradis	Morad Mostafa	France, Egypt, Qatar
IF		Didier Charette	Canada
Invincible		Vincent René-Lortie	Canada
The Late Set		Bren Patrick Burke	Canada
Lingering Pieces		Jacqueline Lamb	Canada
Mrs. Iran's Husband		Marjan Khosravi	Iran
Our Males and Females		Ahmad Alyaseer	Jordan
Portrait of a Cowboy		Devon Wycoff	United States
Return to Hairy Hill	Retour à Hairy Hill	Daniel Gies	Canada
The Riley Sisters		Julia Jackman	United Kingdom
Stripper		Anthony Sneed	Canada
Two Apples		Bahram Javahery	Canada
Until You Die	Jusqu’à ce que tu meures	Florence Lafond	Canada
Walter's Room		Austin Lindsay	Canada
Yellow Dove Aftermath		Rony A. Abovitz	United States
Zeb's Spider		Sophie Jarvis	Canada

=== CTV Best in Shorts ===
The festival's dedicated competition for amateur short filmmakers from Northeastern Ontario.

English title	Original title	Director(s)	Community
A Bunch of Junk		Ian Johnson	Lively
Go On and Bleed		J. Christian Hamilton	Sudbury
I Know I Can Fly		Matt Steeves	Temagami
Jerry Rigged		Derek Diorio	North Bay
L'Orbit		Thomas Walton	Timmins
My Authentic Self (A Journey with Art and Autism)		Stéphane Ostrander	Dowling
Walter’s Room		Austin Lindsay	North Bay
When Little Johnny Sleeps		Sabrina Wilson	Sudbury
