= 2023 BFI London Film Festival =

2023 film festival

67th BFI London Film Festival
- Official artwork for the 2023 BFI London Film Festival.
- Opening film: Saltburn
- Closing film: The Kitchen
- Location: London, United Kingdom
- Founded: 1957
- Festival date: 4–15 October 2023
- Website: whatson.bfi.org.uk/lff/Online/default.asp

BFI London Film Festival
- 2024 2022

The 67th BFI London Film Festival was a film festival that took place from 4–15 October 2023. The competition films were announced on 29 August 2023 while the films for the galas and the strands were revealed on 31 August 2023. The juries for the various sections of the festival were announced on 19 September 2023.

The festival opened with Saltburn, directed by Emerald Fennell, and closed with The Kitchen, directed by Kibwe Tavares and Daniel Kaluuya.

== Juries ==
=== Main Competition ===
- Amat Escalante, Mexican film director, producer and screenwriter
- Kate Taylor, programme director of the 2023 Edinburgh International Film Festival
- Niven Govinden, British novelist

=== First Feature Competition (Sutherland Award) ===
- Raine Allen-Miller, British film director
- Vanja Kaludjercic, festival director of International Film Festival Rotterdam
- Barry Adamson, British musician, composer, filmmaker and photographer

=== Documentary Competition ===
- Rubika Shah, British writer and director
- Jeanie Finlay, British documentary filmmaker
- Paul Tonta, general manager theatrical acquisitions and film festivals at Madman Entertainment

=== Short Film Competition ===
- Charlotte Regan, British writer and director
- Francesca Tomlinson, BFI Film Academy Young Programmer
- Rina Yang, cinematographer

== Venues ==
The partner venues for the festival included:

=== London cinemas ===
- BFI Southbank
- Curzon Soho
- Curzon Mayfair
- Institute of Contemporary Arts
- Vue West End
- Prince Charles Cinema
- Southbank Centre's Royal Festival Hall
- Odeon Luxe Leicester Square - Press and industry screenings
- Picturehouse Central - Press and industry screenings

=== Expanded venues ===
- Bargehouse at Oxo Tower Wharf

=== UK-wide cinemas ===
- HOME, Manchester
- Watershed, Bristol
- Glasgow Film Theatre, Glasgow
- Broadway Cinema, Nottingham
- Showroom Cinema, Sheffield
- Queen's Film Theatre, Belfast
- Chapter, Cardiff
- Tyneside Cinema, Newcastle upon Tyne
- Midlands Arts Centre (MAC), Birmingham

== Official Selection ==
=== Galas ===
The following films were selected for the Galas section, which screens world, European, and British premieres of the most anticipated films.

English Title	Director(s)	Production Country
Opening Night Gala
Saltburn	Emerald Fennell	United Kingdom
Closing Night Gala
The Kitchen	Kibwe Tavares, Daniel Kaluuya	United Kingdom
American Express Gala
One Life	James Hawes	United Kingdom
Mayor of London Gala
Chicken Run: Dawn of the Nugget	Sam Fell	United Kingdom, United States, France
Cunard Gala
The Holdovers	Alexander Payne	United States
Headline Gala
All of Us Strangers	Andrew Haigh	United Kingdom
The Bikeriders	Jeff Nichols	United States
The Book of Clarence	Jeymes Samuel	United States
The Killer	David Fincher	United States
Killers of the Flower Moon	Martin Scorsese	United States
Maestro	Bradley Cooper	United States
May December	Todd Haynes	United States
Nyad	Elizabeth Chai Vasarhelyi, Jimmy Chin	United States
Poor Things	Yorgos Lanthimos	United Kingdom, Ireland, United States

=== Special Presentations ===
The following films were selected for the Special Presentations section.

English Title	Original Title	Director(s)	Production Country
The Boy and the Heron	君たちはどう生きるか	Hayao Miyazaki	Japan
Cobweb	거미집	Kim Jee-woon	South Korea
The End We Start From		Mahalia Belo	United Kingdom
Fallen Leaves	Kuolleet lehdet	Aki Kaurismäki	Finland
Foe		Garth Davis	Australia, United States
Grime Kids		Abdou Cisse	United Kingdom
Hit Man		Richard Linklater	United States
Housekeeping for Beginners		Goran Stolevski	North Macedonia, Poland, Croatia, Serbia, Kosovo, Australia, United States
Les Indésirables	Bâtiment 5	Ladj Ly	France, Belgium
Memory		Michel Franco	Mexico, United States, Chile
Occupied City		Steve McQueen	United Kingdom, Netherlands
Priscilla		Sofia Coppola	United States, Italy
The Zone of Interest		Jonathan Glazer	United Kingdom, United States, Poland

=== In Competition ===
There were five competition sections, each with a different selection of films and different juries.

==== Official Competition ====
The following films competed for the Best Film Award.

English Title	Original Title	Director(s)	Production Country
Baltimore		Christine Molloy, Joe Lawlor	Ireland, United Kingdom
Dear Jassi		Tarsem Singh Dhandwar	India
Europa		Sudabeh Mortezai	Austria, United Kingdom
Evil Does Not Exist	悪は存在しない	Ryusuke Hamaguchi	Japan
Fingernails		Christos Nikou	United States
Gasoline Rainbow		Bill Ross IV, Turner Ross	United States
I Am Sirat		Deepa Mehta, Sirat Taneja	Canada
The Royal Hotel		Kitty Green	Australia
Self Portrait: 47 Km 2020		Zhang Mengqi	China
Starve Acre		Daniel Kokotajlo (director)	United Kingdom
Together 99	Tillsammans 99	Lukas Moodysson	Sweden, Denmark

Highlighted title indicates section winner.

==== First Feature Competition ====
The following films competed for the Sutherland Award, which is awarded to a directorial debut.

English Title	Original Title	Director(s)	Production Country
Black Dog		George Jaques	United Kingdom
Earth Mama		Savanah Leaf	United States, United Kingdom
Hoard		Luna Carmoon	United Kingdom
In Camera		Naqqash Khalid	United Kingdom
Mambar Pierrette		Rosine Mbakam	Belgium, Cameroon
Paradise Is Burning		Mika Gustafson	Sweden, Italy, Denmark, Finland
Penal Cordillera		Felipe Carmona	Chile, Brazil
The Queen of My Dreams		Fawzia Mirza	Canada
Sky Peals		Moin Hussain	United Kingdom
Tiger Stripes		Amanda Nell Eu	Malaysia, Taiwan, Singapore, France, Germany, Netherlands, Indonesia, Qatar
Tuesday		Daina O. Pusić	United Kingdom, United States

Highlighted title indicates section winner.

==== Documentary Competition ====
The following films competed for the Grierson Award, which is awarded to a feature-length documentary.

English Title	Original Title	Director(s)	Production Country
Bye Bye Tiberias		Lina Soualem	France, Palestine, Belgium, Qatar
Celluloid Underground		Ehsan Khoshbakht	United Kingdom, Iran
Chasing Chasing Amy		Sav Rodgers	United States
A Common Sequence		Mary Helena Clark, Mike Gibisser	United States, Mexico
Dancing on the Edge of a Volcano	على حافة البركان	Cyril Aris	Germany, Lebanon
The Klezmer Project	Adentro mía estoy bailando	Leandro Koch, Paloma Schahmann	Austria, Argentina
Queendom		Agniia Galdanova	France, United States
The Taste of Mango		Chloe Abrahams	United Kingdom, United States

Highlighted title indicates section winner.

==== Short Film Competition ====
The following films competed for the Short Film Award.

English Title	Original Title	Director(s)	Production Country
The Archive: Queer Nigerians		Simisolaoluwa Akande	United Kingdom
Area Boy		Iggy London	United Kingdom
Boat People		Thao Lam, Kjell Boersma	Canada
Essex Girls		Yero Timi-Biu	United Kingdom
The Goose's Excuse		Mahdy Abo Bahat, Abdo Zin Eldin	Egypt, United Kingdom
Khabur		Nafis Fathollahzadeh	Germany, Iran
Onset		Anna Engelhardt, Mark Cinkevich	United Kingdom, Poland
The Singer		Cora Bissett	United Kingdom
The Walk		Michael Jobling	United Kingdom
Wells of Despair		Sata Taas	Netherlands

Highlighted title indicates section winner.

=== Strands ===
Most of the out-of-competition films have been organised into strands, each based on a different mood or emotion.

==== Love ====
English Title	Original Title	Director(s)	Production Country
20,000 Species of Bees	20.000 especies de abejas	Estibaliz Urresola Solaguren	Spain
Àma Gloria		Marie Amachoukeli	France
Banel & Adama	Banel et Adama	Ramata-Toulaye Sy	France, Senegal, Mali
Blackbird Blackbird Blackberry		Elene Naveriani	Switzerland, Germany, Georgia
The Eternal Memory	La memoria infinita	Maite Alberdi	Chile
Fancy Dance		Erica Tremblay	United States
Girl		Adura Onashile	United Kingdom
Goodbye Julia	وداعا جوليا	Mohamed Kordofani	Sudan, Egypt, Germany, France, Saudi Arabia, Sweden
Monster	怪物	Hirokazu Kore-eda	Japan
Our Body	Notre Corps	Claire Simon	France
Perfect Days		Wim Wenders	Japan
Robot Dreams		Pablo Berger	Spain, France
Silver Haze		Sacha Polak	Netherlands, United Kingdom
Slow		Marija Kavtaradze	Lithuania, Spain, Sweden
Tótem		Lila Avilés	Mexico, Denmark, France
Unicorns		Sally El Hosaini, James Krishna Floyd	United Kingdom

==== Debate ====
English Title	Original Title	Director(s)	Production Country
Allensworth		James Benning	United Kingdom
Fire Through Dry Grass		Alexis Neophytides, Andres "Jay" Molina	United States
Four Daughters	بنات ألفة	Kaouther Ben Hania	France, Tunisia, Germany, Saudi Arabia
The Goldman Case	Le Procès Goldman	Cédric Kahn	France
High & Low — John Galliano		Kevin Macdonald	France, United States, United Kingdom
Kidnapped	Rapito	Marco Bellocchio	Italy, France, Germany
The Mission		Jesse Moss, Amanda McBaine	United States
On the Adamant	Sur l'Adamant	Nicolas Philibert	France, Japan
The Pigeon Tunnel		Errol Morris	United Kingdom
The Rye Horn	O corno	Jaione Camborda	Spain, Portugal, Belgium
Shoshana		Michael Winterbottom	United Kingdom, Italy
Wilding		David Allen	United Kingdom
Youth (Spring)	青春	Wang Bing	China, France, Luxembourg, Netherlands

==== Laugh ====
English Title	Original Title	Director(s)	Production Country
Asog		Seán Devlin	Philippines, Canada
Bonus Track		Julia Jackman	United Kingdom
The Book of Solutions	Le Livre des solutions	Michel Gondry	France
Daaaaaalí!		Quentin Dupieux	France
The Hypnosis	Hypnosen	Ernst De Geer	Sweden, Norway, France
Molli and Max in the Future		Michael Lukk Litwak	United States
The Nature of Love	Simple comme Sylvain	Monia Chokri	Canada, France
The Practice	La práctica	Martín Rejtman	Argentina, Chile, Portugal
Poolman		Chris Pine	United States
Shortcomings		Randall Park	United States
Terrestrial Verses	آیه‌های زمینی	Ali Asgari, Alireza Khatami	Iran

==== Dare ====
English Title	Original Title	Director(s)	Production Country
Animalia	Parmi nous	Sofia Alaoui	France, Morocco, Qatar
Behind the Mountains	Oura el Jbel	Mohamed Ben Attia	Tunisia, France, Belgium, Italy, Saudi Arabia, Qatar
Do Not Expect Too Much from the End of the World	Nu astepta prea mult de la sfârsitul lumii	Radu Jude	Romania, Luxembourg, France, Croatia
Eileen		William Oldroyd	United States
Foremost by Night	Sobre todo de noche	Víctor Iriarte	Spain, Portugal, France
Inside the Yellow Cocoon Shell	Bên trong vỏ kén vàng	Thien An Pham	Vietnam, Singapore, France, Spain
Last Summer	L'Été dernier	Catherine Breillat	France
Little Girl Blue		Mona Achache	France, Belgium
Music		Angela Schanelec	Germany, France, Serbia
Omen		Baloji	Belgium, Netherlands, Democratic Republic of Congo, France, South Africa
The Peasants	Chłopi	DK Welchman, Hugh Welchman	Poland, Serbia, Lithuania
Power Alley	Levante	Lillah Halla	Brazil, France, Uruguay
A Prince	Un prince	Pierre Creton	France
Red Island	L'Île rouge	Robin Campillo	France, Belgium, Madagascar
Samsara		Lois Patiño	Spain

==== Thrill ====
English Title	Original Title	Director(s)	Production Country
The Animal Kingdom	Le Règne animal	Thomas Cailley	France
The Buckingham Murders		Hansal Mehta	India, United Kingdom
Copa '71		Rachel Ramsay, James Erskine	United Kingdom
Culprits		J Blakeson	United Kingdom
Gassed Up		George Amponsah	United Kingdom
Lost in the Night	Perdidos en la noche	Amat Escalante	Mexico, Germany, Netherlands
Lubo		Giorgio Diritti	Italy, Switzerland
Only the River Flows	河边的错误	Shujun Wei	China
Shame on Dry Land		Axel Petersén	Sweden, Malta
Stolen		Karan Tejpal	India
Unmoored		Caroline Ingvarsson	United Kingdom, Poland, Sweden

==== Cult ====
English Title	Original Title	Director(s)	Production Country
The Beast	La Bête	Bertrand Bonello	France, Canada
Birth/Rebirth		Laura Moss	United States
Late Night with the Devil		Cameron Cairnes, Colin Cairnes	Australia
Nightwatch – Demons Are Forever	Nattevagten - Dæmoner går i arv	Ole Bornedal	Denmark
Red Rooms	Les chambres rouges	Pascal Plante	Canada
Scala!!!		Jane Giles, Ali Catterall	United Kingdom
Stopmotion		Robert Morgan	United Kingdom
Vincent Must Die	Vincent doit mourir	Stéphan Castang	France, Belgium

==== Journey ====
English Title	Original Title	Director(s)	Production Country
All Dirt Roads Taste of Salt		Raven Jackson	United States
The Bride		Myriam U. Birara	Rwanda
The Delinquents	Los delincuentes	Rodrigo Moreno	Argentina
The Echo	El eco	Tatiana Huezo	Mexico, Germany
Expats		Lulu Wang	United States, Hong Kong
Haar		Ben Hecking	United Kingdom
How to Have Sex		Molly Manning Walker	United Kingdom, Greece
If Only I Could Hibernate	Баавгай болохсон	Zoljargal Purevdash	Mongolia, France, Switzerland, Qatar
Inshallah a Boy	Inshallah Walad	Amjad Al Rasheed	Jordan, France, Saudi Arabia, Qatar, Egypt
The Lost Boys	Le Paradis	Zeno Graton	Belgium, France
The New Boy		Warwick Thornton	Australia
Ramona		Victoria Linares Villegas	Dominican Republic, United Kingdom
The Settlers	Los colonos	Felipe Gálvez Haberle	Chile, Argentina, France, Denmark, United Kingdom, Taiwan, Sweden, Germany
Shayda		Noora Niasari	Australia
The Spectre of Boko Haram	Le spectre de Boko Haram	Cyrielle Raingou	Cameroon, France
The Sweet East		Sean Price Williams	United States
That They May Face the Rising Sun		Pat Collins	Ireland, United Kingdom

==== Create ====
English Title	Original Title	Director(s)	Production Country
Anita		Alexis Bloom, Svetlana Zill	United States
Anselm	Anselm – Das Rauschen der Zeit	Wim Wenders	Germany
Apolonia, Apolonia		Lea Glob	Denmark, Poland, France
Close Your Eyes	Cerrar los ojos	Víctor Erice	Spain, Argentina
The Daughters of Fire	As Filhas do Fogo	Pedro Costa	Portugal
Croma Kid		Pablo Chea	Dominican Republic
Going to Mars: The Nikki Giovanni Project		Michèle Stephenson, Joe Brewster	United States
In Restless Dreams: The Music of Paul Simon		Alex Gibney	United States
Menus-Plaisirs – Les Troisgros		Frederick Wiseman	France, United States
The Pot-au-Feu	La Passion de Dodin Bouffant	Tran Anh Hung	France
Ryuichi Sakamoto | Opus		Neo Sora	Japan
Swan Song		Chelsea McMullan	Canada
They Shot the Piano Player	Dispararon al pianista	Fernando Trueba, Javier Mariscal	Spain, France, Netherlands
This Is Going to Be Big		Thomas Charles Hyland	Australia
You Can Call Me Bill		Alexandre O. Philippe	United States

==== Experimenta ====
English Title	Original Title	Director(s)	Production Country
The Lost Art of the Future		Theo Cuthand	Canada
A Radical Duet		Onyeka Igwe	United Kingdom
Speech for a Melting Statue		Collectif Faire-Part	Belgium, Democratic Republic of Congo
Wells of Despair		Sata Taas	Netherlands
The Archive: Queer Nigerians		Simisolaoluwa Akande	United Kingdom
Everything Worthwhile Is Done with Other People		Rehana Zaman	United Kingdom
Night Fishing with Ancestors		Elizabeth Povinelli	Australia
Minevissam (I Am Writing)		Niki Kohandel	United Kingdom
Notes from Gog Magog		Riar Rizaldi	Indonesia
Coders		Anastasia Sosunova	Lithuania
Platform Ghosts – Turker, Farmer, Bot		Aarti Sunder	India
Onset		Anna Engelhardt, Mark Cinkevich	United Kingdom, Poland
Gush		Fox Maxy	United States
Pacific Club		Valentin Noujaïm	France, Qatar
It Can't Be That Nothing That Can Be Returned		Dana Kavelina	Ukraine
Timekeepers of the Anthropocene		Federico Cuatlacuatl	Mexico, United States
Tristxtotl		Mădălina Zaharia	United Kingdom
Mangosteen		Tulapop Saenjaroen	Thailand
The Goose's Excuse		Mahdy Abo Bahat, Abdo Zin Eldin	Egypt, United Kingdom
Room in a Crowd		John Torres	Philippines
Tempo		Yu Araki	Japan
All the Days of May		Miryam Charles	Canada
Wood for the Trees		Rob Crosse	Germany
Sunflower Siege Engine		Sky Hopinka	United States
A Throwing Forth		Xiao Zhang	United States, China
Levitate		Iván Argote	Italy, Spain, France
Desert Dreaming		Abdul Halik Azeez	Sri Lanka
Khabur		Nafis Fathollahzadeh	Germany, Iran

==== Family ====
English Title	Original Title	Director(s)	Production Country
Dancing Queen		Aurora Gossé	Norway
Deep Sea (3D)		Xiaopeng Tian	China
Kensuke's Kingdom		Kirk Hendry, Neil Boyle	United Kingdom, Luxembourg, France
The Sacred Cave		Daniel Minlo	Cameroon, Burkina Faso, France

==== Treasures ====
English Title	Original Title	Director(s)	Production Country
The Black Pirate		Albert Parker	United States
The Dupes	المخدوعون	Tewfik Saleh	Syria
Macario		Roberto Gavaldón	Mexico
Peeping Tom		Michael Powell	United Kingdom
Pressure		Horace Ové	United Kingdom
The Stranger and the Fog	غریبه و مه	Bahram Beyzaie	Iran

=== Shorts ===
The short film programme was divided into the following nine sections.

==== Dialogues Between Past, Present and Future ====
English Title	Original Title	Director(s)	Production Country
The Archive: Queer Nigerians		Simisolaoluwa Akande	United Kingdom
The Lost Art of the Future		Theo Cuthand	Canada
A Radical Duet		Onyeka Igwe	United Kingdom
Speech for a Melting Statue		Collectif Faire-Part	Belgium, Democratic Republic of Congo
Wells of Despair		Sata Taas	Netherlands

==== Stories We Tell ====
English Title	Original Title	Director(s)	Production Country
All the Lights Still Burning		Dominic Leclerc	United Kingdom
Essex Girls		Yero Timi-Biu	United Kingdom
Festival of Slaps		Abdou Cissé	United Kingdom
Only Yourself to Blame		Noomi Yates	United Kingdom
The Scottish Play		James Soldan	United Kingdom
The Singer		Cora Bissett	United Kingdom
Smoking Dolphins		Sean Lyons	United Kingdom

==== What Makes Us ====
English Title	Original Title	Director(s)	Production Country
Area Boy		Iggy London	United Kingdom
Blood		Vathana Suganya Suppiah	United Kingdom, Australia
Gorka		Joe Weiland	United Kingdom
Making Babies	Faire un enfant	Eric K. Boulianne	Canada
Mother of Mine		Jesse Lewis Reece	United Kingdom
Sound & Colour		Emma Foley	Ireland

==== Right Here, Right Now ====
English Title	Original Title	Director(s)	Production Country
Boat People		Thao Lam, Kjell Boersma	Canada
Graveyard of Horses		Xiao Xuan Jiang	China
I Am More Dangerous Dead		Majiye Uchibeke	United States, Nigeria, United Kingdom
Waking Up in Silence		Mila Zhluktenko, Daniel Asadi Faezi	Ukraine, Germany
The Walk		Michael Jobling	United Kingdom
Wildmen of the Greater Toronto Area		Solmund MacPherson	Canada

==== For the Haunted and Possessed ====
English Title	Original Title	Director(s)	Production Country
Coders		Anastasia Sosunova	Lithuania
Notes from Gog Magog		Riar Rizaldi	Indonesia
Onset		Anna Engelhardt, Mark Cinkevich	United Kingdom, Poland
Platform Ghosts – Turker, Farmer, Bot		Aarti Sunder	India

==== The Creeps ====
English Title	Original Title	Director(s)	Production Country
Doris		Edem Dotse	Ghana, United States
Foreigners Only		Nuhash Humayun	Bangladesh, United States
The Garden of Heart		Olivér Hegyi	Hungary, Slovakia
Predators		Jack King	United Kingdom
Pu Ekaw Tnod		Rebecca Culverhouse	United Kingdom
Strangers		Rob Price	United Kingdom
The Test		Olivia Marie Valdez	United States
Yummy Mummy		Gabriela Staniszewska	United Kingdom

==== No Place Called Home ====
English Title	Original Title	Director(s)	Production Country
Hafekasi		Annelise Hickey	Australia
Now and Then		Harris Alvi	United Kingdom
Rizoo		Azadeh Navai	Iran, United States
South Facing		Reneque Samuels	United Kingdom
Torn		Jahfar Muataz	Denmark, Sweden

==== The Land is the Living Witness ====
English Title	Original Title	Director(s)	Production Country
Desert Dreaming		Abdul Halik Azeez	Sri Lanka
Khabur		Nafis Fathollahzadeh	Germany, Iran
Levitate		Iván Argote	Italy, Spain, France
Sunflower Siege Engine		Sky Hopinka	United States
A Throwing Forth		Xiao Zhang	United States, China

==== Animated Shorts for Young Audiences ====
English Title	Original Title	Director(s)	Production Country
Pond		Lena Von Döhren, Eva Rust	Switzerland
Swing to the Moon		Marie Bordessoule, Adriana Bouissie, Nadine De Boer, Elisa Drique, Chloé Lauzu, Vincent Levrero, Solenne Moreau	France
The Day I Became a Bird		Andrew Ruhemann	United Kingdom
The Swineherd		Magnus Igland Møller, Peter Smith	Denmark
Once Upon a Studio		Trent Correy, Dan Abraham	United States
Ahru		Leandro Martinez	Argentina
Hooba		Sem Assink	Netherlands
Upside Down		Dace Rīdūze	Latvia

=== LFF for Free: Shorts ===
The following films were screened during the LFF for Free programme.

==== Big Little Lives ====
English Title	Original Title	Director(s)	Production Country
The After		Misan Harriman	United Kingdom
Such a Lovely Day		Simon Woods	United Kingdom
Pray		Caleb Azumah Nelson	United Kingdom
A Very Short Film About Longing		Eimear McBride	United Kingdom
WOACA		Mackenzie Davis	United Kingdom, New Zealand

==== Star Imagine UK ====
English Title	Original Title	Director(s)	Production Country
Dragon Slayers United		Tom Levinge	United Kingdom
Lionhead		Alvin Yu	United Kingdom
Gently		Kevin Morosky	United Kingdom
Sleepyhead		Milly Garnier	United Kingdom
Nights		Laura Jayne Tunbridge	United Kingdom
Space Plug		Marcus Anthony Thomas	United Kingdom

==== London Calling: Brave Faces ====
English Title	Original Title	Director(s)	Production Country
Seekers		Josh Feder	United Kingdom
Independence		Karl Jackson	United Kingdom
The Girls' Room		Tracey Lopes	United Kingdom
My Brudda		Ntando Brown	United Kingdom
Snow Falls In The Summer		Ajuán Isaac George	United Kingdom

==== London Calling: Being Seen ====
English Title	Original Title	Director(s)	Production Country
The Date		Amy Hodge	United Kingdom
Darwin Story		Natasha Tonkin	United Kingdom
Better		Zoe Hunter Gordon	United Kingdom
Wings		Billy Boyd Cape	United Kingdom
The Call		Riffy Ahmed	United Kingdom

==== Network@LFF Shorts ====
For 2023 the Network@LFF short films were split into three programmes.

English Title	Director(s)	Production Country
Programme 1
Up	Greg Francis	United Kingdom
Muna	Warda Mohamed	United Kingdom, Somalia
VHS	Solène Guichard	United Kingdom
The Heritage	Andrew Rutter	France
Programme 2
Oba	Femi Oladigbolu	United Kingdom
High Tide	Johnny Massahi	United Kingdom
The Last Days	Dipo Baruwa-Etti	United Kingdom
The Mobius Trip	Simone Smith	United Kingdom
Seekers	Josh Feder	United Kingdom
Programme 3
Malcolm	Caleb J. Roberts	United Kingdom, Ireland
Doss House	Charlotte James	United Kingdom
Alo	Xenia Glen	United Kingdom
All The Lights Still Burning	Dominic Leclerc	United Kingdom
Salt Water Town	Dan Thorburn	United Kingdom

==== 4Love ====
English Title	Original Title	Director(s)	Production Country
Dope Fiend		Rosanagh Griffiths	United Kingdom
Battery		Ewan Marshall	United Kingdom
Pyramid of Disunion		Ella Glendining, Jessi Gutch	United Kingdom
MO <3 KYRA 4EVA		Debbie Hannan	United Kingdom

=== Surprise Film ===
Ferrari, dir. Michael Mann

== Awards ==
=== Competition ===
- Best Film Award: Evil Does Not Exist, dir. Ryusuke Hamaguchi
- Sutherland Award (First Feature): Paradise Is Burning, dir. Mika Gustafson
- Grierson Award (Documentary): Bye Bye Tiberias, dir. Lina Soualem
- Short Film Award: The Archive: Queer Nigerians, dir. Simisolaoluwa Akande

=== Audience Awards ===
- Best Feature: Gassed Up, dir. George Amponsah
- Best Documentary: The Taste of Mango, dir. Chloe Abrahams
- Best British Film or Work: Festival of Slaps, dir. Abdou Cisse
- Best Immersive/XR: Murals, Lead artists. Alex Topaller, Daniel Shapiro and Artem Ivanenko
