= 2023 Calgary International Film Festival =

- Opening film: Geoff McFetridge: Drawing a Life by Dan Covert
- Closing film: Hey, Viktor! by Cody Lightning
- Location: Calgary, Alberta, Canada
- Founded: 2000
- Festival date: September 21–October 1, 2023
- Website: ciffcalgary.ca

Calgary International Film Festival
- 2024 2022

The 2023 edition of the Calgary International Film Festival, the 24th edition in the event's history, took place from September 21 to October 1, 2023 in Calgary, Alberta, Canada.

The festival opened with Geoff McFetridge: Drawing a Life, a documentary film by Dan Covert about Calgary-born artist Geoff McFetridge, and closed with Cody Lightning's comedy film Hey, Viktor!.

== Awards ==
In 2023, the festival introduced a new CA$5,000 juried prize for Best Canadian Narrative Feature sponsored by Air Canada, as a complement to its existing RBC Emerging Artist Award for first-time Canadian filmmakers. New filmmakers remained eligible for the RBC Award, while Canadian films by more established directors were eligible for the Air Canada award.

Juried award winners were announced on September 25, with audience-voted award winners announced at the conclusion of the festival.

Award	Film	Filmmaker
Audience Choice Alberta Feature	Tales from the Rez	Colin Ahnahktsipiitaa Van Loon, Sinakson Trevor Solway
Audience Choice Canadian Narrative Feature	Humanist Vampire Seeking Consenting Suicidal Person (Vampire humaniste cherche suicidaire consentant)	Ariane Louis-Seize
Audience Choice Canadian Documentary Feature	Summer Qamp	Jen Markowitz
Audience Choice International Narrative Feature	The Persian Version	Maryam Keshavarz
Audience Choice International Documentary Feature	Geoff McFetridge: Drawing a Life	Dan Covert
Audience Choice Late Shift	The Puppetman	Brandon Christensen
Audience Choice Generation Next	Aitamaako'tamisskapi Natosi: Before the Sun	Banchi Hanuse
Audience Choice Music on Screen	Immediate Family	Denny Tedesco
Audience Choice Special Presentations	The Old Oak	Ken Loach
Audience Choice Alberta Short	MONSTR	Tank Standing Buffalo
Audience Choice Narrative Short	Dead Cat (Chat mort)	Annie-Claude Caron, Danick Audet
Audience Choice Animated Short	Ninety-Five Senses	Jerusha Hess, Jared Hess
Audience Choice Documentary Short	Jack and Sam	Jordan Matthew Horowitz
Air Canada Canadian Narrative Feature	Suze	Dane Clark, Linsey Stewart
Air Canada Canadian Narrative Feature, Special Jury Citation	Suze	Charlie Gillespie (performance)
RBC Emerging Canadian Artist	Humanist Vampire Seeking Consenting Suicidal Person (Vampire humaniste cherche suicidaire consentant)	Ariane Louis-Seize
RBC Emerging Canadian Artist, Special Jury Citation	Asog	Seán Devlin
RBC Emerging Canadian Artist, Special Jury Citation	Hey, Viktor!	Cody Lightning
DGC Canadian Documentary Feature	Swan Song	Chelsea McMullan
DGC Canadian Documentary Feature, Special Jury Citation	Summer Qamp	Jen Markowitz
International Narrative Feature	Animalia (Parmi nous)	Sofia Alaoui
International Narrative Feature, Special Jury Citation	Close to You	Elliot Page (performance)
International Narrative Feature, Special Jury Citation	20,000 Species of Bees (20.000 especies de abejas)	Estibaliz Urresola Solaguren (direction)
International Documentary Feature	Between the Rains	Moses Thuranira, Andrew H. Brown
Short Film Grand Jury Prize	Palm Sunday	Wes Andre Goodrich
Devon Bolton Memorial Award	MONSTR	Tank Standing Buffalo
Youth by Youth Canada Short Film Award	Operation Carl	Sandra Hurd
Live Action Short Film	Death to the Bikini! (À mort le bikini!)	Justine Gauthier
Animated Short Film	Boat People	Thao Lam, Kjell Boersma
Documentary Short Film	The Last Repair Shop	Ben Proudfoot, Kris Bowers
Student Short Film	Simone	Aisha Amin

== Official selections ==
=== Canadian Narrative Competition ===
English title	Original title	Director(s)	Production country
Asog		Seán Devlin	Canada
Fitting In		Molly McGlynn	Canada
Float		Sherren Lee	Canada
Hey, Viktor!		Cody Lightning	Canada
Humanist Vampire Seeking Consenting Suicidal Person	Vampire humaniste cherche suicidaire consentant	Ariane Louis-Seize	Canada
I Don't Know Who You Are		M. H. Murray	Canada
I Used to Be Funny		Ally Pankiw	Canada
In Flames		Zarrar Kahn	Canada
My Animal		Jacqueline Castel	Canada
The Queen of My Dreams		Fawzia Mirza	Canada
Red Rooms	Les Chambres rouges	Pascal Plante	Canada
Richelieu		Pier-Philippe Chevigny	Canada
Solo		Sophie Dupuis	Canada
Suze		Dane Clark, Linsey Stewart	Canada
Wild Goat Surf		Caitlyn Sponheimer	Canada

=== Canadian Documentary Competition ===
English title	Original title	Director(s)	Production country
Aitamaako'tamisskapi Natosi: Before the Sun		Banchi Hanuse	Canada
Close the Divide		Tom Acton	Canada
Cover Your Ears		Sean Patrick Shaul	Canada
Cynara		Sherien Barsoum	Canada
I Lost My Mom	J'ai placé ma mère	Denys Desjardins	Canada
I'm Just Here for the Riot		Kathleen Jayme, Asia Youngman	Canada
Mr. Dressup: The Magic of Make-Believe		Robert McCallum	Canada
Subterranean		Francois-Xavier De Ruydts	Canada
Summer Qamp		Jen Markowitz	Canada
Swan Song		Chelsea McMullan	Canada
Unsyncable		Megan Wennberg	Canada
We Will Be Brave		Chrisann Hessing	Canada

=== International Narrative Competition ===
English title	Original title	Director(s)	Production country
20,000 Species of Bees	20.000 especies de abejas	Estibaliz Urresola Solaguren	Spain
Animalia	Parmi nous	Sofia Alaoui	Morocco, France, Qatar
Benji's Hour		Gabriel Kahane	United States
Blaga's Lessons	Urotcite na Blaga	Stefan Komanderev	Bulgaria, Germany
Close to You		Dominic Savage	Canada, United Kingdom
Elaha		Milena Aboyan	Germany
Martínez		Lorena Padilla	Mexico
The Mattachine Family		Andy Vallentine	United States
The Other Widow	הפילגש	Maayan Rypp	France, Israel
The Persian Version		Maryam Keshavarz	Turkey, United States
Riley		Benjamin Howard	United States
Tótem		Lila Avilés	Mexico, Denmark, France

=== International Documentary Competition ===
English title	Original title	Director(s)	Production country
Between the Rains		Moses Thuranira, Andrew H. Brown	Kenya, United Kingdom
Break the Game		Jane M. Wagner	United States
Fantastic Machine		Axel Danielson, Maximilien Van Aertryck	Denmark, Sweden
Four Daughters	بنات ألفة	Kaouther Ben Hania	France, Tunisia, Germany, Saudi Arabia
Going Varsity in Mariachi		Alejandra Vasquez, Sam Osborn	United States
Great Photo, Lovely Life		Amanda Mustard, Rachel Beth Anderson	United States
Jesszilla		Emily Sheskin	United States
On the Adamant	Sur l'Adamant	Nicolas Philibert	France, Japan
Silver Dollar Road		Raoul Peck	United States
Smoke Sauna Sisterhood	Savvusanna sõsarad	Anna Hints	Estonia, France, Iceland
Werner Herzog: Radical Dreamer		Thomas von Steinaecker	Germany, United Kingdom
You Can Call Me Bill		Alexandre O. Philippe	United States

=== Features not in competition ===
English title	Original title	Director(s)	Production country
About Dry Grasses	Kuru Otlar Üstüne	Nuri Bilge Ceylan	Turkey, France, Germany, Sweden
Anatomy of a Fall	Anatomie d'une chute	Justine Triet	France
The Animal Kingdom	Le Règne animal	Thomas Cailley	France
Big Boys		Corey Sherman	United States
La Chimera		Alice Rohrwacher	Italy, France, Switzerland
The Delinquents	Los delincuentes	Rodrigo Moreno	Argentina, Brazil, Luxembourg, Chile
A Difficult Year	Une année difficile	Éric Toledano and Olivier Nakache	France
Drop		Ramin Eshraghi-Yazdi	Canada
Dumb Money		Craig Gillespie	United States
Evil Does Not Exist	悪は存在しない	Ryûsuke Hamaguchi	Japan
Fallen Leaves	Kuolleet lehdet	Aki Kaurismäki	Finland, Germany
Faultline		Anna Cooley	Canada
Hailey Rose		Sandi Somers	Canada
How to Have Sex		Molly Manning Walker	United Kingdom
How We Ended Us		Grant Harvey	Canada
If Only I Could Hibernate	Баавгай болохсон, Baavgai Bolohson	Zoljargal Purevdash	Mongolia
Inside the Yellow Cocoon Shell	Bên trong vỏ kén vàng	Phạm Thiên Ân	Vietnam, Singapore, France, Spain
Isle of Hope		Damian Romay	United States
Jericho Ridge		Will Gilbey	United Kingdom
Kidnapped	Rapito	Marco Bellocchio	Italy, France, Germany
Little Brother		Sheridan O'Donnell	United States
A Little Prayer		Angus MacLachlan	United States
Mayhem	Farang	Xavier Gens	France, Thailand
Monster	怪物	Hirokazu Kore-eda	Japan
The Old Oak		Ken Loach	United Kingdom, France, Belgium
Peak Season		Steven Kanter, Henry Loevner	United States
Perfect Days		Wim Wenders	Japan, Germany
The Pot-au-Feu	La Passion de Dodin Bouffant	Tran Anh Hung	France
The Promised Land	Bastarden	Nikolaj Arcel	Denmark, Germany, Sweden
The Puppetman		Brandon Christensen	United States
Robot Dreams		Pablo Berger	Spain, France
Romi		Robert Cuffley	Canada
The Royal Hotel		Kitty Green	Australia, United Kingdom
The Sacrifice Game		Jenn Wexler	United States
Seven Veils		Atom Egoyan	Canada
Sleep	잠	Jason Yu	South Korea
The Teachers' Lounge	Das Lehrerzimmer	Ilker Çatak	Germany
The Ties That Bind		James Reckseidler	Canada
Tótem		Lila Avilés	Mexico, Denmark, France
Vincent Must Die	Vincent doit mourir	Stéphan Castang	France, Belgium
When Evil Lurks	Cuando acecha la maldad	Demián Rugna	Argentina

=== Documentaries not in competition ===
English title	Original title	Director(s)	Production country
Anselm	Anselm – Das Rauschen der Zeit	Wim Wenders	Germany
Geoff McFetridge: Drawing a Life		Dan Covert	United States
Immediate Family		Denny Tedesco	United States
Joan Baez: I Am a Noise		Miri Navasky, Maeve O'Boyle, Karen O'Connor	United States
Kiss the Future		Nenad Cicin-Sain	Bosnia and Herzegovina, United States, Ireland
The Lebanese Burger Mafia		Omar Mouallem	Canada
Patria y Vida: The Power of Music		Beatriz Luengo	Spain
They Shot the Piano Player	Dispararon al pianista	Fernando Trueba, Javier Mariscal	Spain, France, Netherlands
The Stones & Brian Jones		Nick Broomfield	United Kingdom
Without Leaving Anyone Behind		Sylvester Ndumbi	Canada

=== Episodic ===
English title	Original title	Director(s)	Production country
Tales from the Rez		Sinakson Trevor Solway, Colin Ahnahktsipiitaa Van Loon	Canada
Telling Our Story		Kim O'Bomsawin	Canada

=== Shorts ===
English title	Original title	Director(s)	Production country
27		Flóra Anna Buda	France, Hungary
6 Minutes per Kilometre	6 minutes/km	Catherine Boivin	Canada
At Last		Resmiye Emir	Turkey
Basri & Salma in a Never-Ending Comedy	Basri & Salma Dalam Komedi Yang Terus Berputar	Khozy Rizal	Indonesia
Beauty Visa		Kate He, Simeon Hu	United States
Between Earth & Sky		Andrew Nadkarni	United States
Blond Night	Nuit blonde	Gabrielle Demers	Canada
Boat People		Thao Lam, Kjell Boersma	Canada
The Breakthrough		Daniel Sinclair	United States
Calf		Jamie O'Rourke	Ireland
Catherine & Michael		Kathy Fusco	United States
Chemical Somnia		Scott Portingale	Canada
Christopher at Sea		Tom CJ Brown	France
Closing Dynasty		Lloyd Lee Choi	United States
Coaching While Black		Alex Eskandarkhah	Canada
Coddle No More		Nicholas Bentgen	United States
Conviction		Bruce Thomas Miller	Canada
Counter Clockwise		Roman Shipley	Canada
Dead Cat	Chat mort	Annie-Claude Caron, Danick Audet	Canada
Death & Ramen		Tiger Ji	United States
Death to the Bikini!	À mort le bikini!	Justine Gauthier	Canada
Detour		Kargo Chen	Hong Kong
Dicks That I Like		Johanna Gustin	Germany
Don't Come In...Yet		Isaac Elliott	Australia
Eeva		Lucija Mrzljak, Morten Tšinakov	Croatia, Estonia
The Family Portrait		Lea Vidakovic	Croatia, France, Serbia
The Firefighter's Ball	Le Bal des pompoers	Baptiste Drapeau	France
Fishmonger		Neil Ferron	United States
The Gateway		Kamala Parel-Nuttall	Canada
The Girl with the Red Beret		Janet Perlman	Canada
Go for Gold		John Torres	Canada
Grill		Jade Hærem Aksnes	Norway
Hide Your Crazy		Austin Kase	United States
High End Dying		Helen Liu	Canada
Hiraeth		Emma McDonald	Canada
Hit Man: Secrets of Lies		Elias Plagianos	United States
Hooks	Les crochets	Charles Parisé	Canada
Human Resources	Ressources humaines	Trinidad Plass, Titouan Tillier, Isaac Wenzek	France
I Have No Tears and I Must Cry		Luis Fernando Puente	United States
In the Heat		Sam Chou	Canada
It's a Date		Nadia Parfan	Ukraine
Jack and Sam		Jordan Matthew Horowitz	United States
Jinn Julian		Jae Sterling	Canada
The Key to the Heart of Time		MJ Hansen	Canada
A Kind of Testament		Stephen Vuillemin	France
Kolaj		Gülce Besen Dilek	Germany
Konpa		Al'Ikens Plancher	United States
Lo-Tech Reality		Guillermo Garcia Lopez	Spain
Losing Blue		Leanne Allison	Canada
Making Money in Manitou, Manitoba		Austin Ladouceur	Canada
Mine		Esabella Strickland	Canada
Monstr		Tank Standing Buffalo	Canada
My Eyes Are Up Here		Nathan Morris	United Kingdom
Mystic Tiger		Marc Martínez Jordán	Spain
Nai Nai & Wai Po: Grandma & Grandma		Sean Wang	United States
Nian		Michelle Krusiec	United States
Ninety-Five Senses		Jerusha Hess, Jared Hess	United States
No More Kîyâm		Lese Skidmore	Canada
Noodles Forever		McKinley Carlin	United States
Okem		Joshua Okwuosa	Nigeria, United States
Old Dragon Man		Douglas Cook	Canada
Only You		James David Duric	Canada
Operation Carl		Sandra Rachel Hurd	Canada
The Orchestra Chuck Built		Christopher Stoudt	United States
Overtime		Jenny Lee-Gilmore	Canada
Pacific Bell		Sandrine Béchade	Canada
Palm Sunday		Wes Andre Goodrich	United States
Piece by Piece		Reza Rasouli	Austria
Poof		Margaret Miller	United States
Power Signal		Oscar Boyson	United States
Pussy Love		Linda Krauss	Germany
Rise of Afrobeats in the Prairies		Fahad Suleiman	Canada
Salopica		Serenella Sol, Callum McCormack	Canada
Shadow Brother Sunday		Alden Ehrenreich	United States
Simone		Aisha Amin	United States
Soleil de nuit		Fernando Lopez Escriva, Maria Camila Arias	Canada
The Soup		John Torres	Canada
The Sperm Bank		Margaux Susi	United States
Suzy Makes Cupcakes		Jayson Therrien	Canada
The Syrian Cosmonaut		Charles Emir Richards	Turkey
Third Wheel		Kevin Haefelin	Japan, Switzerland
Tiny		Ritchie Hemphill, Ryan Haché	Canada
Two One Two		Shira Avni	Quebec
Unveiled Traditions		Lili Yas Tayefi	Canada
Wave Rider		Dustin Chok	Canada
Well Wishes My Love, Your Love		Gabriel Gabriel Garble	Malaysia, Sweden
White Ant		Shalini Adnani	India, United Kingdom
Yellowbird		Tsvetelina Zdraveva, Jerred North	United States
Zip		Ava Maria Safai	Canada

=== Special Experiences ===
English title	Original title	Director(s)	Production country
Heartland; Special gala screening of episode #250		Dean Bennett	Canada
How to Fail as a Popstar with Q&A and musical performance by Vivek Shraya		Vanessa Matsui	Canada
The Hunchback of Notre Dame with new live score by Chad VanGaalen		Wallace Worsley	United States
Smoke Signals retrospective screening linked to competition title Hey, Viktor!		Chris Eyre	United States
