= César Award for Best Short Film =

French film award

- Country: France
- Presented by: Académie des Arts et Techniques du Cinéma
- First award: 1992
- Final award: 2021
- Currently held by: So What If the Goats Die (2021)
- Website: academie-cinema.org

The César Award for Best Short Film (French: César du meilleur film de court métrage) is a discontinued award presented by the Académie des Arts et Techniques du Cinéma from 1992 to 2021. It was split into the César Award for Best Fiction Short Film and César Award for Best Documentary Short Film in 2022.

== Winners and nominees ==
=== 1990s ===
Year	English title	Original title	Director(s)
1992 (17th)	25 décembre 58, 10h36		Diane Bertrand
1992 (17th)	Haut pays des neiges		Bernard Palacios
1992 (17th)	Herman Heinzel, ornithologue		Jacques Mitsch
1992 (17th)	La Saga des Glaises		David Ferre, Olivier Thery Lapiney
1993 (18th)	Versailles Rive-Gauche		Bruno Podalydès
1993 (18th)	Hammam		Florence Miailhe
1993 (18th)	The Streetsweeper	Le Balayeur	Serge Elissalde
1993 (18th)	Omnibus		Sam Karmann
1994 (19th)	Gueule d'atmosphère		Olivier Péray
1994 (19th)	Comment font les gens		Pascale Bailly
1994 (19th)	Empreintes		Camille Guichard
1994 (19th)	Ex-memoriam		Beriou
1995 (20th)	The Screw	La Vis	Didier Flamand
1995 (20th)	Deus ex machina		Vincent Mayrand
1995 (20th)	Elles		Joanna Quinn
1995 (20th)	Émilie Muller		Yvon Marciano
1996 (21st)	The Monk and the Fish	Le Moine et le poisson	Michaël Dudok De Wit
1996 (21st)	Corps inflammables		Jacques Maillot
1996 (21st)	Le Bus		Jean-Luc Gaget
1996 (21st)	Roland		Lucien Dirat
1997 (22nd)	Madame Jacques on the Croisette	Mme Jacques sur la croisette	Emmanuel Finkiel
1997 (22nd)	Dialogue au sommet		Xavier Giannoli
1997 (22nd)	Un taxi Aouzou		Issa Serge Coelo
1997 (22nd)	A Summer Dress	Une robe d'été	François Ozon
1997 (22nd)	Une visite		Philippe Harel
1998 (23rd)	Majorettes in Space	Des majorettes dans l'espace	David Fourier
1998 (23rd)	Ferrailles		Laurent Pouvaret
1998 (23rd)	Seule		Érick Zonca
1998 (23rd)	Tout doit disparaître		Jean-Marc Moutout
1998 (23rd)	The Old Lady and the Pigeons	La Vieille Dame et les Pigeons	Sylvain Chomet
1999 (24th)	L'Interview		Xavier Giannoli
1999 (24th)	La Vieille Barrière		Lyèce Boukhitine
1999 (24th)	The Clothes Pegs	Les Pinces à linge	Joël Brisse
1999 (24th)	Tueurs de petits poissons		Alexandre Gavras
1999 (24th)	La Vache qui voulait sauter par dessus l'église		Guillaume Casset

=== 2000s ===
Year	English title	Original title	Director(s)
2000 (25th)	Dirtie Basterdz	Sale Battars	Delphine Gleize
2000 (25th)	À l'ombre des grands baobabs		Rémy Tamalet
2000 (25th)	Anna's Trip	Acide animé	Jacques Mitsch
2000 (25th)	Camping sauvage		Abd-el-Kader Aoun, Giordano Gederlini
2000 (25th)	17, rue Bleue		Chad Chenouga
2001 (26th)	Salam		Souad El-Bouhati
2001 (26th)	Un petit air de fête		Éric Guirado
2001 (26th)	Au bout du monde		Konstantin Bronzit
2001 (26th)	Le Puits		Jérôme Boulbès
2002 (27th)	A Summer Night Rendez-vous	Au premier dimanche d'août	Florence Miailhe
2002 (27th)	Pieces of My Wife	Des morceaux de ma femme	Frédéric Pelle
2002 (27th)	Les Filles du douze		Pascale Breton
2002 (27th)	Millevaches (expérience)		Pierre Vinour
2002 (27th)	The Apple, the Fig and the Almond	La Pomme, la Figue et l'Amande	Joël Brisse
2003 (28th)	Cowhide	Peau de vache	Gérald Hustache-Mathieu
2003 (28th)	Candidature		Emmanuel Bourdieu
2003 (28th)	That Old Dream That Moves	Ce vieux rêve qui bouge	Alain Guiraudie
2003 (28th)	Squash		Lionel Bailliu
2004 (29th)	The Man Without a Head	L'Homme sans tête	Juan Solanas
2004 (29th)	La Chatte andalouse		Gérald Hustache-Mathieu
2004 (29th)	I'll Wait for the Next One...	J'attendrai le suivant	Philippe Orreindy
2004 (29th)	Pacotille		Éric Jameux
2005 (30th)	Cousines		Lyes Salem
2005 (30th)	Hymne à la gazelle		Stéphanie Duvivier
2005 (30th)	La méthode Bourchnikov		Grégoire Sivan
2005 (30th)	Les Parallèles		Nicolas Saada
2006 (31st)	After Shave		Hany Tamba
2006 (31st)	La Peur, petit chasseur		Laurent Achard
2006 (31st)	Obras		Hendrick Dusollier
2006 (31st)	Sous le bleu		David Oelhoffen
2007 (32nd)	Fais de beaux rêves		Marilyne Canto
2007 (32nd)	Bonbon au poivre		Marc Fitoussi
2007 (32nd)	The Guitar Lesson	La Leçon de guitare	Martin Rit
2007 (32nd)	Le Mammouth Pobalski		Jacques Mitsch
2007 (32nd)	Les Volets		Lyèce Boukhitine
2008 (33rd)	Le Mozart des pickpockets		Philippe Pollet-Villard
2008 (33rd)	Deweneti		Dyana Gaye
2008 (33rd)	Premier Voyage		Grégoire Sivan
2008 (33rd)	La Promenade		Marina de Van
2008 (33rd)	Rachel		Frédéric Mermoud
2009 (34th)	Les Miettes		Pierre Pinaud
2009 (34th)	Les Paradis perdus		Hélier Cisterne
2009 (34th)	Skhizein		Jérémy Clapin
2009 (34th)	Taxi Wala		Lola Frederich
2009 (34th)	Une leçon particulière		Raphaël Chevènement

=== 2010s ===
Year	English title	Original title	Director(s)
2010 (35th)	It's Free for Girls	C'est gratuit pour les filles	Claire Burger and Marie Amachoukeli
2010 (35th)	¿Dónde está Kim Basinger?		Édouard Deluc
2010 (35th)	La Raison de l'autre		Foued Mansour
2010 (35th)	Séance familiale		Cheng-Chui Kuo
2010 (35th)	Les Williams		Alban Mench
2011 (36th)	Logorama		H5 (François Alaux, Hervé de Crécy, Ludovic Houplain)
2011 (36th)	Petit Tailleur		Louis Garrel
2011 (36th)	Une pute et un poussin		Clément Michel
2011 (36th)	Monsieur l'Abbé		Blandine Lenoir
2011 (36th)	Saint Louis Blues	Un transport en commun	Dyana Gaye
2012 (37th)	The Piano Tuner	L'Accordeur	Olivier Treiner
2012 (37th)	La France qui se lève tôt		Hugo Chesnard
2012 (37th)	J'aurais pu être une pute		Baya Kasmi
2012 (37th)	Je pourrais être votre grand-mère		Bernard Tanguy
2012 (37th)	A World Without Women	Un monde sans femmes	Guillaume Brac
2013 (38th)	The Lobster's Cry	Le Cri du homard	Nicolas Guiot
2013 (38th)	It's Not a Cowboy Movie	Ce n'est pas un film de cow-boys	Benjamin Parent
2013 (38th)	What We'll Leave Behind	Ce qu'il restera de nous	Vincent Macaigne
2013 (38th)	The Hounds	Les Meutes	Manuel Schapira
2013 (38th)	La Vie parisienne		Vincent Dietschy
2014 (39th)	Just Before Losing Everything	Avant que de tout perdre	Xavier Legrand
2014 (39th)	Bambi		Sébastien Lifshitz
2014 (39th)	La Fugue		Jean-Bernard Marlin
2014 (39th)	Les Lézards		Vincent Mariette
2014 (39th)	Marseille la nuit		Marie Monge
2015 (40th)	La Femme de Rio		Emma Luchini and Nicolas Rey
2015 (40th)	Aïssa		Clément Tréhin-Lalanne
2015 (40th)	Inupiluk		Sébastien Betbeder
2015 (40th)	The Days Before	Les Jours d'avant	Karim Moussaoui
2015 (40th)	My Sense of Modesty	Où je mets ma pudeur	Sébastien Bailly
2015 (40th)	La Virée à Paname		Carine May and Hakim Zouhani
2016 (41st)
2016 (41st)	Back Alley	La Contre-allée	Cécile Ducrocq
2016 (41st)	The Last of the Frenchmen	Le Dernier des Céfrans	Pierre-Emmanuel Urcun
2016 (41st)	Essaie de mourir jeune		Morgan Simon
2016 (41st)	Guy Môquet		Demis Herenger
2016 (41st)	Mon héros		Sylvain Desclous
2017 (42nd)
2017 (42nd)	Maman(s)		Maïmouna Doucouré
2017 (42nd)	Vers la tendresse		Alice Diop
2017 (42nd)	Après Suzanne		Félix Moati
2017 (42nd)	Au bruit des clochettes		Chabname Zariab
2017 (42nd)	Chasse Royale		Lise Akoka and Romane Gueret
2018 (43rd)
2018 (43rd)	Les Bigorneaux		Alice Vial
2018 (43rd)	Le Bleu blanc rouge de mes cheveux		Josza Anjembe
2018 (43rd)	Wake Up Kinshasa!	Debout Kinshasa !	Sébastien Maitre
2018 (43rd)	Marlon		Jessica Palud
2018 (43rd)	Les Misérables		Ladj Ly
2019 (44th)
2019 (44th)	Les Petites Mains		Rémi Allier
2019 (44th)	Les Indes Galantes		Clément Cogitore
2019 (44th)	Laissez-Moi Danser		Valérie Leroy
2019 (44th)	Kapitalistis		Pablo Muñoz Gómez
2019 (44th)	Braguino		Clément Cogitore

=== 2020s ===
Year	English title	Original title	Director(s)
2020 (45th)	By a Hair	Pile Poil	Lauriane Escaffre and Yvonnick Muller
2020 (45th)	Ahmed's Song	Le Chant d'Ahmed	Foued Mansour
2020 (45th)	Beautiful Loser		Maxime Roy
2020 (45th)	Blue Dog	Le Chien bleu	Fanny Liatard
2020 (45th)	Nefta Football Club		Yves Piat
2021 (46th)	So What If the Goats Die	Qu'importe si les bêtes meurent	Sofia Alaoui
2021 (46th)	Among the Almond Trees	Je serais parmi les amandiers	Marie Le Floc'h
2021 (46th)	The Atomic Journey	L'aventure atomique	Loïc Barché
2021 (46th)	First Goodbyes	Un Adieu	Mathilde Profit
2021 (46th)	Freed	Baltringue	Josza Anjembe

== See also ==
- Academy Award for Best Live Action Short Film
- BAFTA Award for Best Short Film
- European Film Award for Best Short Film
- César Award for Best Animated Short Film
- César Award for Best Fiction Short Film
