= CKNN-FM =

Radio station in Bella Coola, British Columbia, Canada

- Q'umk'uts', Bella Coola, British Columbia; Canada
- Broadcast area: Coastal and Northern British Columbia, Canada
- Frequency: 91.1 MHz
- Branding: Nuxalk Radio

Programming
- Format: First Nations community radio

Ownership
- Owner: Alkw Media Society; (Nuxalk Acwsalcmalslayc Academy of Learning)

History
- First air date: 21 June 2014

Technical information
- Class: LP
- ERP: 50 Watts (Horizontal polarization only)
- HAAT: −908 metres (−2,979 ft)
- Transmitter coordinates: 52°22′15.96″N 126°44′42.00″W

Links
- Webcast: http://nuxalkradio.com/live
- Website: nuxalkradio.com

CKNN-FM, branded as Nuxalk Radio, is a non-commercial community radio station broadcasting from the Nuxalk village of Q'umk'uts', Kulhulmcilh, in Bella Coola, British Columbia. It was founded 21 June 2014 and broadcasts on 91.1 FM and online. The Alkw Media Society administers Nuxalk Radio with a board of directors from the Nuxalk and Bella Coola community.

The radio station was the subject of Nuxalk Radio, a short documentary film by Banchi Hanuse that premiered at the 2020 Vancouver International Film Festival. Its operations, particularly the programming of host Qwaxw Siwallace, were also profiled as part of Hanuse's 2026 feature documentary film Ceremony.
