= Hailey Rose =

2023 Canadian comedy-drama film

- Directed by: Sandi Somers
- Written by: Sandi Somers
- Produced by: Scott Lepp
- Starring: Em Haine; Caitlynne Medrek; Kari Matchett
- Cinematography: Becky Parsons
- Edited by: Nina Staum
- Music by: Alec Harrison
- Production companies: Connect 3 Media; Iylond Entertainment
- Distributed by: Sphere Films
- Release date: September 21, 2023 (Cinéfest)
- Running time: 93 minutes
- Country: Canada
- Language: English

Hailey Rose is a Canadian comedy-drama film, directed by Sandi Somers and released in 2023. The film stars Em Haine as Hailey, a young woman who has been estranged from her family for ten years after being unfairly blamed for the death of her father in a fishing accident, who must return home to Nova Scotia and come to terms with her past after her sister Rose (Caitlynne Medrek) calls to tell her that their mother Olga (Kari Matchett) has died.

The cast also includes Riley Reign as Hailey's non-binary partner Syd, as well as Billy MacLellan, Josh Cruddas, David Oulton, Francine Deschepper, Katerina Bakolias, Brian George, Ryan Willis, Bella Martin, Morgan Saunders, Eric Payne, Ian Wilson, Denise Somers and Sharleen Kalayil in supporting roles.

The film entered production in November 2022, in Chester and Hubbards, Nova Scotia.

== Distribution ==
The film premiered at the 2023 Cinéfest Sudbury International Film Festival. It was subsequently screened at the 2023 Calgary International Film Festival, Image+Nation, and in the Borsos Competition program at the 2023 Whistler Film Festival.

The film went into commercial release in April 2024.
