= Please, After You =

- Directed by: Rob Michaels
- Screenplay by: Amir Kahnamouee
- Starring: Sammy Azero; Neema Nazeri
- Cinematography: Christoph Benfey
- Edited by: Luke Higginson
- Music by: Erica Procunier
- Production company: Vortex Media
- Release date: February 5, 2024 (WFF)
- Running time: 93 minutes
- Country: Canada
- Language: English

Please, After You is a Canadian comedy film, directed by Rob Michaels and released in 2024. The film stars Sammy Azero as Ali, an Iranian Canadian engineer in Toronto whose grand plans to chase the Canadian dream are upended when his sweet but bumbling cousin Omid (Neema Nazeri) arrives from Iran hoping to claim refugee status, and getting in the way of Ali's professional and romantic opportunities.

The cast also includes Juno Rinaldi, Kris Siddiqi and Julie Nolke in supporting roles.

The film premiered in the Borsos Competition program at the 2024 Whistler Film Festival. It was subsequently screened at the 2025 Canadian Film Festival, before going into limited commercial release later in 2025.

Erica Procunier received a Canadian Screen Award nomination for Best Original Score at the 14th Canadian Screen Awards in 2026.
