= Aitamaako'tamisskapi Natosi: Before the Sun =

2023 Canadian documentary film

- Directed by: Banchi Hanuse
- Written by: Banchi Hanuse; Tanya Maryniak
- Produced by: Carey Newman, Izzy Pullen (executive producers); Mike Wavrecan (producer)
- Starring: Logan Red Crow
- Cinematography: Luke Connor; Ben Giesbrecht
- Edited by: Tanya Maryniak
- Music by: Jason and Nadia Burnstick
- Production company: Taxam Films
- Release date: February 25, 2023 (Big Sky)
- Running time: 90 minutes
- Country: Canada
- Languages: English; Siksika

Aitamaako'tamisskapi Natosi: Before the Sun is a 2023 Canadian documentary film, directed by Banchi Hanuse. The film profiles Logan Red Crow, a young Siksika woman who is preparing to compete in the male-dominated Indian Relay horse race.

The film premiered on February 25, 2023 at the Big Sky Documentary Film Festival in Montana, and had its Canadian premiere at the 2023 Hot Docs Canadian International Documentary Festival in April.

== Awards ==
At Big Sky, the film won the Big Sky Award for films honouring "the character, history, tradition and imagination of the American West".

It won five Leo Awards in 2023, for Best Feature Length Documentary (Carey Newman, Izzy Pullen, Mike Wavrecan), Best Screenwriting in a Feature Length Documentary (Hanuse, Tanya Maryniak), Best Cinematography in a Feature Length Documentary (Luke Connor, Ben Giesbrecht), Best Picture Editing in a Feature Length Documentary (Maryniak) and Best Sound in a Feature Length Documentary (David Parfit, Brenda Sevilla, Ariana Brophy, Tyler Devon Gillis, Jayme Langen, Zak Cohen).

The film was named to the initial longlist for the 2023 Jean-Marc Vallée DGC Discovery Award.

At the 2023 Cinéfest Sudbury International Film Festival, the film won the Cinema Indigenized Outstanding Talent Award. At the 2023 Calgary International Film Festival, it won the Audience Choice award for Generation Next.

Connor and Giesbrecht received a Canadian Screen Award nomination for Best Cinematography in a Documentary at the 12th Canadian Screen Awards in 2024.
