= Dyana Gaye =

French-Senegalese film director (born 1975)

- Born: 1975 (age 50–51); Paris
- Occupation: Film director
- Years active: 2000-present

Dyana Gaye (born 1975) is a French-Senegalese film director.

== Biography ==
Born in Paris in 1975, the daughter of Senegalese immigrants, Gaye attended the University of Paris 8 Vincennes-Saint-Denis and studied film. She received the Louis Lumière - Villa Médicis grant in 1999 for her screenplay Une femme pour Souleymane. Gaye directed it in 2000, and it received the Grand Jury Prize at the Dakar Film Festival. In 2004, she was one of the finalists for the Rolex Mentor and Protégé Arts Initiative. Gaye directed the short film J’ai deux amours, as part of the Paris la métisse project in 2005. The next year, she directed Ousmane, which was a critical success. It received a nomination for Best Short Film at the César Awards. In 2009, Gaye produced and directed Saint Louis Blues, which was a musical comedy. Screened at the Locarno Film Festival and Sundance Film Festival, it was one of the five finalists for Best Short Film at the César Awards. The film was selected, financed and produced as a part of the Focus Features Africa First program.

She was a 2012 laureate of the Gan Foundation Creation Prize. Gaye directed Under the Starry Sky in 2013, becoming the first feature film to be filmed between Dakar, Turin, and New York City. It was screened at the Toronto International Film Festival and was awarded the Grand Jury Prize and the Audience Prize at the Premiers Plans Angers Festival. Gaye described the film as a continuation of her previous short films, and an exploration of multiple identities as well as immigration.

Gaye is a member of Collectif 50/50, an organization whose stated goal is to have equality between men and women in the film industry, as well as promoting diversity in cinema.

== Partial filmography ==
- 2000 : Une femme pour Souleymane
- 2005 : J’ai deux amours
- 2006 : Ousmane
- 2009 : Saint Louis Blues
- 2013 : Under the Starry Sky
- 2014 : Un conte de la Goutte d'or
