= Majorettes in Space =

- Des majorettes dans l'espace
- Directed by: David Fourier
- Written by: David Fourier
- Produced by: Carole Scotta
- Starring: Elise Laurent; Jean-Marc Delacruz; Olivier Laville
- Narrated by: Philippe Bianco
- Cinematography: Pierre Stoeber
- Edited by: Fabrice Rouaud
- Production company: Haut et Court
- Distributed by: Haut et Court
- Release date: 12 January 1996
- Running time: 6 minutes
- Country: France
- Language: French

Majorettes in Space (French: Des majorettes dans l'espace) is a French short film written and directed by David Fourier and released in 1996. It won the 1997 BAFTA Award for Best Short Film and the 1998 César Award for Best Short Film.

== Summary ==
Two male Russian cosmonauts, one of whom has a fetish for majorettes, are in space without condoms. A young heterosexual couple have sex outdoors. Pope John Paul II is passionate about airports but enforces the sexually restrictive teachings of the Catholic Church. Vincent, a young gay man, is dying of AIDS.

== Cast ==
- Elise Laurent: Catherine
- Jean-Marc Delacruz: Laurent
- Olivier Laville: Vincent
- Cléo Delacruz: Julie
- Aurélien Bianco: Arnaud

== Awards and nominations ==
- Audience Award (National Competition) at the Clermont-Ferrand International Short Film Festival
- 1997: BAFTA Award for Best Short Film
- 1998: César Award for Best Short Film
