= Return to Hairy Hill =

2023 Canadian short film directed by Daniel Gies

- French: Retour à Hairy Hill
- Directed by: Daniel Gies
- Written by: Daniel Gies; Emily Paige
- Produced by: Emily Paige
- Cinematography: Sébastien Gros
- Music by: Tyler Fitzmaurice; Jessica Moss
- Production company: E.D. FILMS
- Release date: May 12, 2023 (SCA)
- Running time: 17 minutes
- Country: Canada

Return to Hairy Hill (French: Retour à Hairy Hill) is a Canadian animated short film, directed by Daniel Gies and released in 2023. Blending two-dimensional, three-dimensional and puppet animation styles, the film is based on the true story of Gies's grandmother, who made an effort to keep her siblings together after they were abandoned by their parents but was ultimately separated from them after they were taken into protective custody and was never successfully reunited with all of them in her lifetime.

The film premiered at the 2023 les Sommets du cinéma d'animation.

== Plot ==
In an isolated prairie home at Hairy Hill, Alberta, a young girl shoulders the burden of caring for her three siblings and navigating a dysfunctional relationship with their mother. When the mother mysteriously transforms into a bird and abandons her children, this resilient eldest sister struggles to maintain their isolated existence. As the siblings, one by one, undergo a metamorphosis into animals and forsake her for the enchanting forest, she faces a poignant choice: embrace her own transformation and join them in the vast wilderness of their home or defy fate, embracing her scarred humanity, and venture into the towns and cities of the world to forge her own destiny.

== Accolades ==
| Award | Year | Category | Status | Ref |
| Sommets du cinéma d'animation | 2023 | Grand Prix Guy L. Coté pour le Meilleur film d'animation canadien | Won | |
| Cinéfest Sudbury International Film Festival | 2023 | Outstanding Animated Short Film | Won | |
| GIRAF International Festival of Independent Animation | 2023 | Top Canadian short Film | Honored | |
| VIEW Conference | 2023 | 2023 Grand Prize | Won | |
| Los Angeles International Children's Film Festival | 2024 | Daniel Koops Award for Outstanding Film Score | Won | |
| Festival international du film pour enfants de Montréal | 2024 | Prix de meilleur court-métrage d'animation (Best Animated Short Prize) | Won | |
| Canadian Screen Awards | 2024 | Best Animated Short | Nominated | |
| Prix Iris | 2024 | Best Animated Short Film | Nominated | |
