= Kulhulmcilh =

National territory of the Nuxalk Nation

Kulhulmcilh Nuxalkulmc Nuxalk Territory
- Time immemorial–1869 (as a State)
- Location of Kulhulmcilh (dark green) – in Canada (light green & dark grey) – in British Columbia (light green)
- Status: Independent country (time immemorial–1869); Band government (1869–2019); Nunuts’xlhuusnm & Band gov't (2019–)
- Capital: Q'umk'uts
- Common languages: It7Nuxalkmc, English
- Demonym: Nuxalkmc
- Government: Band (Chief & Council); Ancestral (Nuxalk Stataltmc)
  - High Chief & Chair: Pootlass
  - Nuxalk Stataltmc: List of Hereditary Chiefs: Alamtsi; Nuximlayc; Anuspuxals; Sats'alanlh; Lhulhulhnimut; Sixilaaxayc; Lhuu7ya; Slicxwliqw; Licmutusayc; Snuxyaltwa; Nanus; Talyu–Hans; Nuqwlqwliyu; Tl'alamn; Nusyutamayc; Yulatimut; Lhmtimut; Ximximlayc; Snxiluulha
- Elected Chief
  - 2021–2023: Samuel Schooner
- Legislature: House of Smayusta
- History
  - Descent from Alhkw’ntam: Time immemorial
  - Established: Time immemorial
  - Contact with George Vancouver: 1793
  - Smallpox epidemic: 1862
  - Indian Act (1876): 1869
  - Potlatch ban: 1884–1951
  - Disestablished: 1869 (as a State)
  - Declaration of understanding: 2019

Area
- Pre-invasion: 18,000 km^{2} (6,900 sq mi)
- 1864: 20.25 km^{2} (7.82 sq mi)

Population
  - Pre-invasion: 35,000
  - 1780: 1,400
  - 1864: 300
  - 1902: 311
  - 2020: 1,786
- Today part of: British Columbia, Canada

Nuxalk "Bella Coola Valley"
- Person: Nuxalk
- People: Nuxalkmc
- Language: It7Nuxalkmc
- Country: Kulhulmcilh (Nuxalkulmc)

Kulhulmcilh (It7Nuxalkmc: "our land"; Nuxalk pronunciation: [kʷuɬulmçiɬ]), also known as Nuxalkulmc ("Nuxalk Country"; Nuxalk pronunciation: [ʔnuχalkʷulmç]) and Nuxalk Territory, is the ancestral, traditional, and unceded territory (or country) of the Nuxalk Nation. It is located on the central coast of British Columbia, Canada, centred in and around Bella Coola (Qʼumkʼuts). Nuxalk Territory neighbours Waxvwuisaxv (Heiltsuk Country) and the Haisla to the north, the Wuikinuxv to the south, and to Dakelh Keyoh and Tŝilhqot'in Nen in the interior. Without a treaty between the Canadian State and the Nuxalk Nation, much of Kulhulmcilh's land base is disputed between the two governments. Since 1869 and the application of the Indian Act, the nation has been governed by an imposed chief and council band structure, disrupting the historical system of nunutsʼxlhuusnm whereby Nuxalkmc were governed by the Stataltmc (ancestral leadership). The elected Chief and Council signed a memorandum of understanding with Nuxalk Stataltmc on June 28, 2019, outlining a path forward to revive and re-implement the ancestral system of governance in Kulhulmcilh. Similarly, the language (It7Nuxalkmc) is undergoing a revival where it both is heard on CKNN-FM Nuxalk Radio and is being taught in both the provincial school system and the Nuxalk Nation's own school, Acwsalcta, which means "a place of learning".

== Etymology ==
Kulhulmcilh and Nuxalkulmc mean "our land" and "Nuxalk Country," respectively, in It7Nuxalkmc. The name "Nuxalk" for the language comes from the native Nuxalk, referring to the "Bella Coola Valley". "Bella Coola" is a rendering of the Heiltsuk bḷ́xʷlá, meaning "stranger".

== Government ==
Currently, Kulhulmcilh is overseen by a number of different governments: the original, ancestral government (or nunutsʼxlhuusnm as led by the Nuxalk Stataltmc), the imposed band government with an elected Chief and Council, and the governments of British Columbia and Canada. The Chief and Council, as a relic of the Indian Act, directly oversee Bella Coola Indian Reserve No. 1 (accounting for just 0.1% of their territory) whilst the provincial and federal governments oversee the remaining 99.9% of Kulhulmcilh's lands and waters. However, there is an active resurgence of traditional governance, and the Stataltmc have recently signed a memorandum of understanding with the Chief and Council in order to lay the foundation for future decision-making processes in the nation.

=== Traditional governance ===
Nunuts’xlhuusnm, or the Nuxalk system of governance, and its law are supported by four foundations or pillars, known as sliix (treasures). As the Nuxalk Nation writes on their website:

- Smayusta: What’s its origin, where does Nuxalk law originate from
- Klhalhta: What’s its practice, where does Nuxalk law gather its strength from
- Tcamatlhh: What’s its place, how is Nuxalk law validated and reinforced
- Kwʼalhtnta: How does this help our community, what does this mean for the Nuxalk Nation today?

Several other foundations are given in addition to the sliix: "ceremonies, sxayaaxa (protocols), stl’cw (ethics), responsibilities, ksnmsta (land stewardship), relations, and ancestry."

Holding these pillars are the Stataltmc, or traditional chiefs, who meet in the House of Smayusta. Alongside the hereditary chiefs, elders and community supporters work together in the physical House building in order to lead the nation. As the nation describes it, "The House of Smayusta translates as "House of Stories" and refers to the ancestral stories of families that describe family lines and histories, the basis of Nuxalk organization. The House of Smayusta represents the sovereignty and traditional government of the Nuxalk."

=== Treaty ===
To this day, no treaty has been signed between the Canadian State and the Nuxalk Nation. The stance of the nation remains resolute in not signing a modern treaty, especially in light of the deal given to the Nisg̱a’a Nation.

== Culture ==
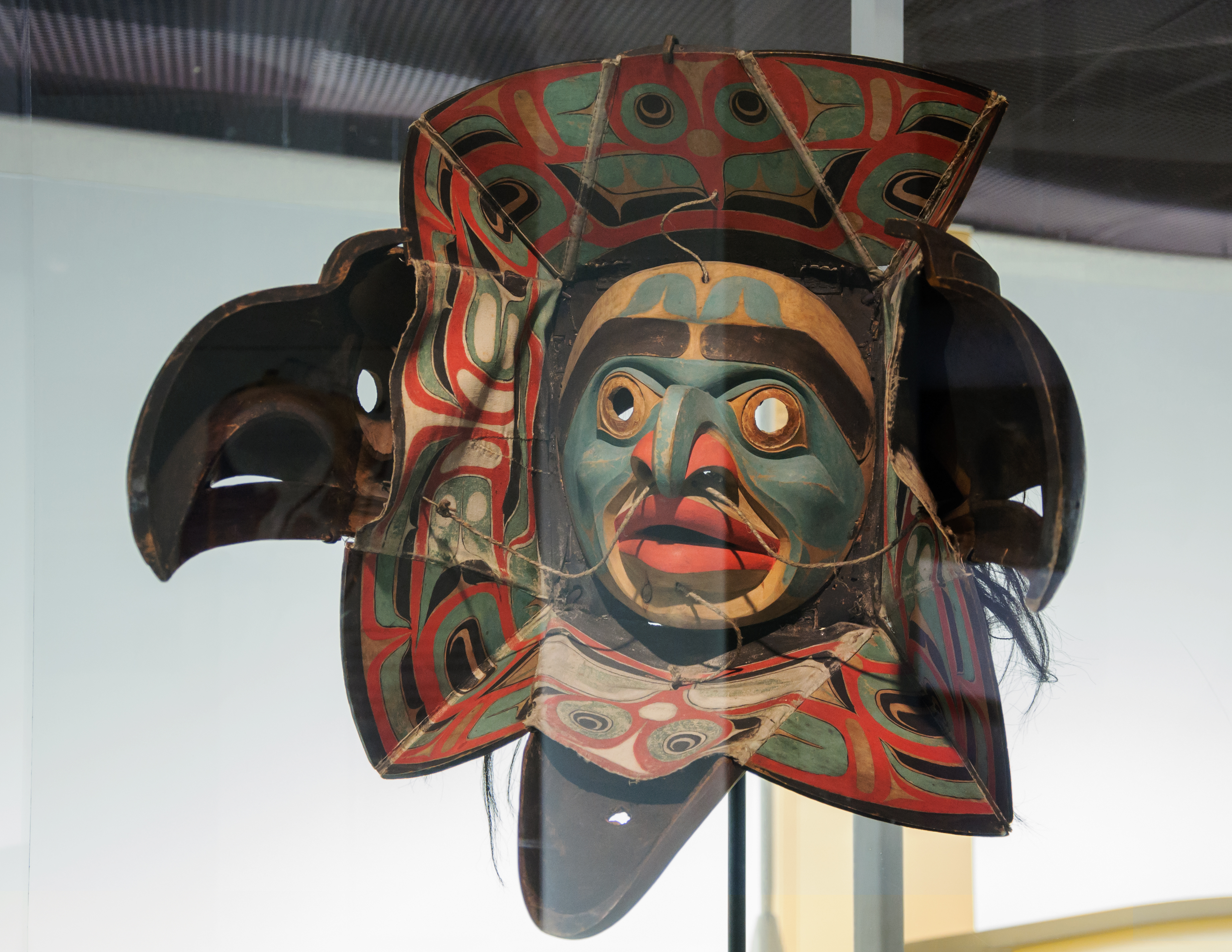
Nuxalk transformation mask, 19th century

Nuxalk culture is indigenous to Kulhulmcilh, and it, alongside neighbouring nations like the Kwakwakaʼwakw and Heiltsuk, is part of the wider spectrum of Pacific Northwest Indigenous cultures. Their art, like that of their neighbours, centres formline, with button blankets as a core, cultural practice. Also like other nations along the BC and Alaskan coasts, there are specific laws around storytelling and other treasures (like masks and dances), where specific families and individuals own specific stories/treasures, and it is only those families and individuals who are allowed to share them.

=== Language ===
The Nuxalk language, once called Bella Coola, is a distinct Salishan language, with a lexicon equidistant from Coast and Interior Salish. It shares phonological and morphological features with Coast Salish (e.g., the absence of pharyngeals and the presence of marked gender). Nuxalk also borrows many words from contiguous North Wakashan languages (especially Heiltsuk), as well as some from neighbouring Dene languages (like Dakelh and Tsilhqotʼin) and Tsimshian.

Nuxalk differs from its relatives in allowing for the construction of words, phrases and entire sentences using only obstruent consonants, which is typologically extremely rare: e.g. kʼclhhtscw slhxwtlhhts 'you had seen me go through the passage'. This feature is believed to be derived from contact with Oowekyala.

There has been some dispute as to how to count the syllables in such words and whether the concept of 'syllable' is even applicable to Nuxalk. However, when recordings are available, the syllable structure can be clearly audible, and speakers have clear conceptions as to how many syllables a word contains.

== History ==
The Nuxalk Nation has been present in Kulhulmcilh for several thousand years, potentially back 14,000 years before present. The nation divides their history into four eras: the early period (14,000 – 9,000 BP), the middle period (9,000 BP – 5000 BP), the great period (5,000 BP – 1793 CE), and the modern period (1793 CE – present). It was during the early periods that the laws, traditions, and economy (like that of the grease trail) of the Nuxalkmc coalesced.

=== Colonization ===
Captain George Vancouver first entered Nuxalk waters in the summer of 1793; weeks later, via an overland route, Alexander Mackenzie arrived into Kulhulmcilh. To this day, the welcome given to Mackenzie is recounted in Nuxalk stories. Shortly thereafter, settlers encroached upon Nuxalk territory in large numbers, culminating in the 1862 Pacific Northwest smallpox epidemic that saw the deaths of around 90% of the Nuxalk population. As an emergency response, the survivors regrouped and landed in Q'umk'uts, what is now called Bella Coola. By 1921, the last citizens joined those who remained in Q'umk'uts, and the modern Nuxalk Nation was formed.

During this period, two major policies gravely impacted the nation: the Potlatch ban and Indian Residential Schools. The potlatch, or lhlm in ItNuxalkmc, is a central ceremony to the economic and legal/political systems of the Nuxalk and surrounding nations. With its ban, the practice went underground until the law was lifted in 1951. Similarly, residential schools sought to destroy Nuxalk culture and assimilate Nuxalkmc into the Canadian body politic. Most Nuxalk children were sent to the Port Alberni residential school where imprisoned students were consistently and systematically abused. There are ongoing investigations into the deaths at that—which number at 67 confirmed—and other residential schools, which were shut down in 1997.

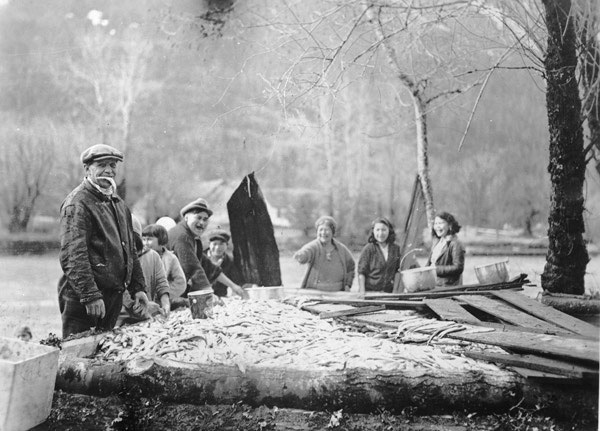
Nuxalk people gathered around an eulachon stink box near the Bella Coola River.

Over the course of colonization, the waters of Kulhulmcilh have also been disastrously over-fished. This has led to a collapse of the salmon and eulachon fisheries, the latter directly impacting one of the core pillars of the Nuxalk economy. Indeed, the eulachon runs were one of the primary elements in Kulhulmcilh's food economy whereby the first catch would be shared with the community at large to ensure the entire nation was fed. The Nuxalk Nation has since released their Marine Use Plan and established the Nuxalk Guardian Watchmen to watch over their waters, maintaining scientific analyses in order to ensure their resources are sustainably managed.

== Geography ==
Kulhulmcilh extends over an area of approximately 18,000 km^{2} on BC's central coast. The landscape mostly consists of islands and waterways marked by fjords. Ecologically, it is dominated by the coastal forest, a temperate coniferous forest ecoregion.

=== Climate ===
The climate of Kulhulmcilh is a moderate oceanic climate (Köppen Cfb) due to its proximity to the Pacific Ocean. Its summers are warmer than coastal places much further south due to its semi-inland position. The maritime air is made warmer by the passage of the outer islands, but is stronger in terms of winter moderation.

== See also ==
- Nuxalk
- Nuxalk language

== Sources ==
- Bagemihl, Bruce (1991a). "Syllable Structure in Bella Coola". Proceedings of the North East Linguistics Society. 21: 16–30. hdl:20.500.14394/36612.
- Nater, Hank F. (1984). The Bella Coola Language. Mercury Series, Canadian Ethnology Service. Vol. 92. Ottawa: National Museums of Canada.
- Nater, Hank (2022-01-16). "The Nuxalk Language : (lexicon, narratives, grammar)". ScienceOpen Preprints. doi:10.14293/S2199-1006.1.SOR-.PPC20XL.v1.
