= Dam! The Story of Kit the Beaver =

2017 film

- Directed by: Kjell Boersma
- Written by: Kjell Boersma
- Produced by: Josh Clavir; Mark Jones
- Music by: Erica Procunier
- Production company: Astronaught Media
- Release date: February 25, 2017
- Running time: 12 minutes
- Country: Canada

Dam! The Story of Kit the Beaver is a Canadian animated short film, directed by Kjell Boersma and released in 2017. The film centres on Kit, a young beaver who is helping her family build a beaver dam.

The film was created as part of the Toronto Symphony Orchestra's project of commissioning original works by Canadian composers to celebrate Canada 150. While most participating composers had their work performed by symphonies across Canada in conventional concert performances, Erica Procunier was selected to compose the score to a short animated film, which would premiere at Roy Thomson Hall with the TSO performing the composition live. The film had its TSO premiere on February 25, 2017, and was subsequently screened in other cities with the score performed by local orchestras. A version with the score prerecorded was also made available to film festivals.

At the 2017 Animation Block Party, the film won the award for Best Children's Animation. The film was a Canadian Screen Award nominee for Best Animated Short Film at the 6th Canadian Screen Awards.
