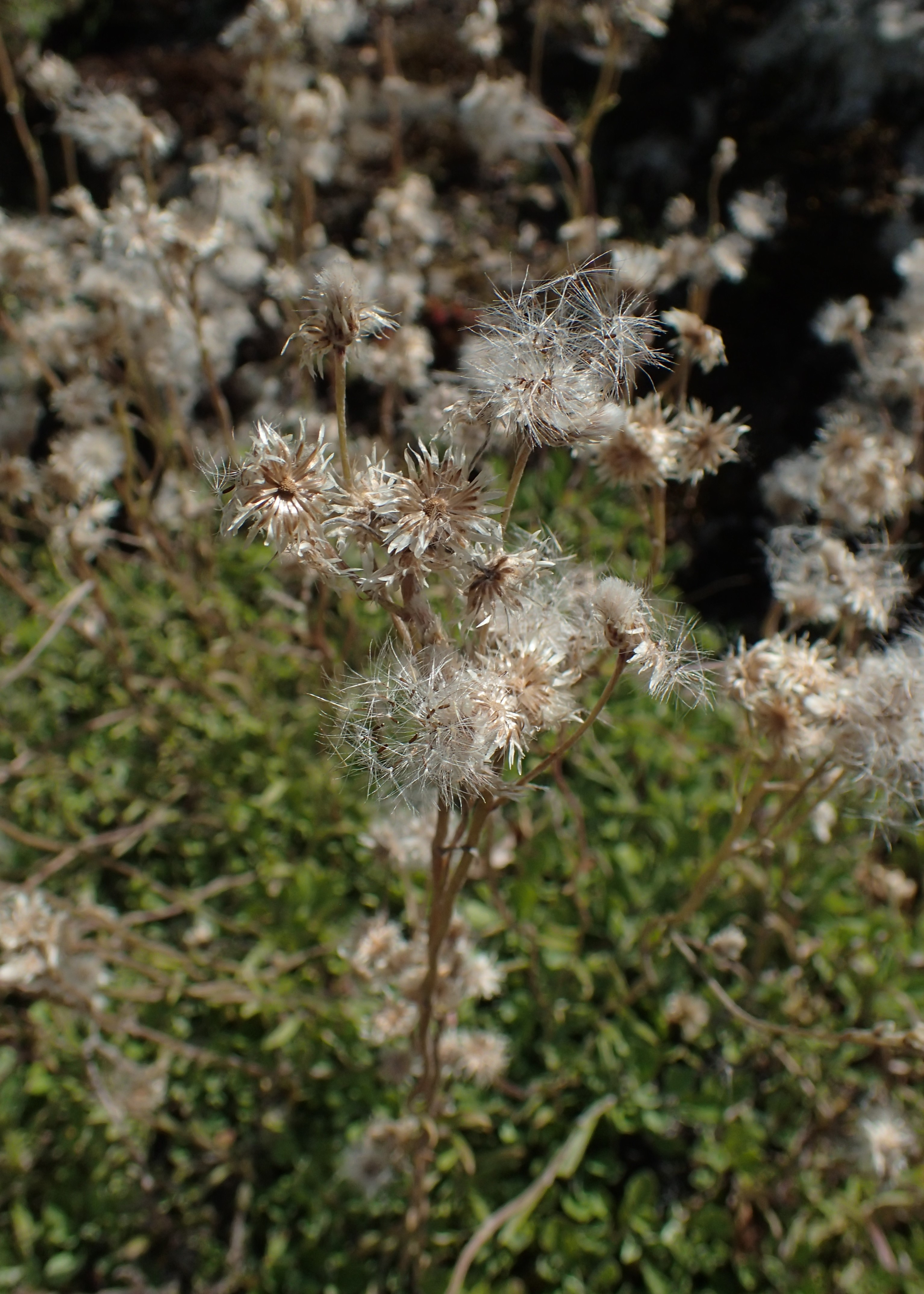
- Canadian pussytoes A. howellii subsp. canadensis

Conservation status
- Secure (NatureServe)

Scientific classification
- Kingdom: Plantae
- Clade: Tracheophytes
- Clade: Angiosperms
- Clade: Eudicots
- Clade: Asterids
- Order: Asterales
- Family: Asteraceae
- Genus: Antennaria
- Species: A. howellii

Binomial name
- Antennaria howellii Greene

Synonyms
- Synonymy: Antennaria callilepis Greene; Antennaria eximia Greene; Antennaria canadensis Greene, syn of subsp. canadensis; Antennaria isabellina (Greene) Greene ex House, syn of subsp. canadensis; Antennaria randii Fernald, syn of subsp. canadensis; Antennaria spathulata (Fernald) Fernald, syn of subsp. canadensis; Antennaria neodioica Greene, syn of subsp. neodioica; Antennaria obovata E.E.Nelson, syn of subsp. neodioica; Antennaria rhodantha Fernald, syn of subsp. neodioica; Antennaria rupicola Fernald, syn of subsp. neodioica; Antennaria russellii Boivin, syn of subsp. neodioica; Antennaria grandis (Fernald) House, syn of subsp. neodioica; Antennaria appendiculata Fernald, syn of subsp. petaloidea; Antennaria concolor Piper, syn of subsp. petaloidea; Antennaria pedicellata Greene, syn of subsp. petaloidea; Antennaria petaloidea (Fernald) Fernald, syn of subsp. petaloidea; Antennaria stenolepis Greene, syn of subsp. petaloidea

= Antennaria howellii =

Species of flowering plant

Antennaria howellii, the everlasting or Howell's pussytoes, is a North American species of plant in the family Asteraceae. It is native to northern Alaska, much of Canada including the Arctic territories, and the northern United States as far south as northern California, Colorado and North Carolina.

Antennaria howellii is an evergreen perennial plant. The form is usually basal rosettes, largely clonally propagated. The basal rosette leaves are 2–4 cm long and 6–12 mm broad, light green and spatulate, with a thin arm and a broad tip with a point. They have woolly white undersides. The flowerheads appear in May, on a stem 15–35 cm tall with smaller, slender leaves 1–4 cm long. It is commonly seen growing under pine stands.

Subspecies

- Antennaria howellii subsp. howellii – western + north-central US, western + central Canada including Yukon
- Antennaria howellii subsp. canadensis – northeastern US, eastern + central Canada including Labrador
- Antennaria howellii subsp. neodioica – Canada, northern US
- Antennaria howellii subsp. petaloidea – Canada, northern US

The plant is named for American botanist Thomas J. Howell, who collected the first known specimens of the plant in 1887.

== Conservation status in the United States ==
The petaloidea subspecies is listed as a special concern and believed extirpated in Connecticut.

== Native American ethnobotany ==
The Nuxalk Nation take a decoction of leaves for body pain, but not pain in the limbs. The Ojibwe take an infusion of the neodioica subspecies after childbirth to purge afterbirth and to heal.
