= Erica Procunier =

Canadian film and television composer

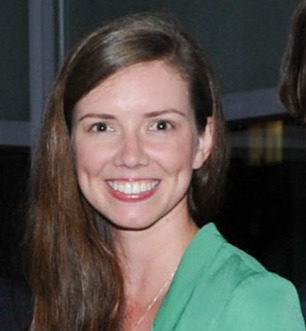
Erica Procunier at the Slaight Music Residency Showcase 2013

Erica Procunier is a Canadian film and television composer. She is most noted for her work on the 2021 The Nature of Things episode "The COVID Cruise", for which she won the Canadian Screen Award for Best Original Music, Nonfiction at the 10th Canadian Screen Awards in 2022, and the television series Ghostwriter, for which she was a Daytime Emmy Award nominee for Outstanding Music Direction and Composition for a Daytime Program at the 48th Daytime Emmy Awards in 2021.

A native of Sarnia, Ontario, she is an alumna of the Slaight Family Music Lab at the Canadian Film Centre.

Her other credits have included the films Mariner, Dam! The Story of Kit the Beaver, Don't Talk to Irene, The Dancing Dogs of Dombrova, Please, After You and Halfway Haunted, and the television series By the Rapids, Little Dog, Detention Adventure, Lockdown and Thomas & Friends: All Engines Go.
