= Shady Hanna =

Canadian cinematographer

- Born: Cairo, Egypt
- Occupation: Cinematographer
- Years active: 2015 - Present

Shady Hanna is a Canadian cinematographer. He worked on the documentary film Swan Song (2023). In 2025, he was named one of the "Rising Stars of Cinematography" by the American Society of Cinematographers.

== Life and career ==
Hanna was born in Cairo, Egypt, and later settled in Toronto, Canada, where he earned a Bachelor of Fine Arts degree in film production from York University. He is a member of the Canadian Society of Cinematographers (CSC).

== Selected filmography ==
- 2023 – Junglefowl
- 2023 – Swan Song
- 2025 – Sitting Bull (2 Episodes)

=== Music video ===
- 2020: Orson Wilds: "Stand Up"
- 2022: Nonso Amadi: "Foreigner"

== Awards and nominations ==
Year	Result	Award	Category	Work	Ref.
2023	Nominated	Canadian Society of Cinematographers Awards	Best Cinematography in Dramatic Short	Junglefowl	
2024	Nominated	Canadian Society of Cinematographers Awards	Best Documentary Cinematography	Swan Song	
2025	Nominated	Canadian Screen Awards	Best Photography, Documentary or Factual	Swan Song	
