= The Old Oak =

2023 British drama film by Ken Loach

Coordinates: 54.815141°N 1.386338°W

- British theatrical release poster
- Directed by: Ken Loach
- Screenplay by: Paul Laverty
- Produced by: Rebecca O'Brien
- Starring: Ebla Mari; Dave Turner
- Cinematography: Robbie Ryan
- Edited by: Jonathan Morris
- Music by: George Fenton
- Production companies: Sixteen Films; Why Not Productions; Les Films du Fleuve; BBC Film
- Distributed by: Le Pacte (France); StudioCanal (United Kingdom)
- Release dates: 26 May 2023 (Cannes); 29 September 2023 (United Kingdom); 25 October 2023 (France)
- Running time: 113 minutes
- Countries: Belgium; France; United Kingdom
- Language: English
- Box office: $7.7 million

The Old Oak is a 2023 drama film directed by Ken Loach and written by Paul Laverty. It follows TJ (Dave Turner), the owner of a small pub, who forms a bond with Syrian refugee Yara (Ebla Mari). It is a co-production between the United Kingdom, France and Belgium.

The film had its world premiere at the 2023 Cannes Film Festival on 26 May, where it competed for the Palme d'Or. It was released in the United Kingdom by StudioCanal on 29 September. At the 77th British Academy Film Awards, it was nominated for Outstanding British Film.

== Premise ==
Pub landlord TJ Ballantyne, living in a previously thriving mining community in County Durham, struggles to hold onto his pub and keep it as the one remaining public space where people can meet in the town. Meanwhile, tensions rise when Syrian refugees are placed there, but Ballantyne strikes up a friendship with one of the refugees, Yara.

== Cast ==
- Dave Turner as Tommy Joe "TJ" Ballantyne
- Ebla Mari as Yara
- Claire Rodgerson as Laura
- Trevor Fox as Charlie
- Chris McGlade as Vic
- Col Tait as Eddy
- Jordan Louis as Garry
- Chrissie Robinson as Erica
- Chris Gotts as Jaffa Cake
- Jen Patterson as Maggie
- Arthur Oxley as Archie
- Joe Armstrong as Joe
- Andy Dawson as Micky
- Maxie Peters as Tommy
- Debbie Honeywood as Tania
- Neil Leiper as Rocco

== Production ==
The film was set and shot in the northeast of England. Loach, who turned 87 prior to its release, told The Hollywood Reporter it would "probably" be his last film. Production companies on the film include UK's Sixteen Films, StudioCanal UK and BBC Film, France's Why Not Productions, and Belgium's Les Films du Fleuve. The script was written by Paul Laverty. Rebecca O'Brien produced the film. The film was scored by George Fenton.

=== Filming ===
Filming began in May 2022, and took place over six weeks. Locations used in County Durham included Murton, Horden, Easington and Durham Cathedral. The pub in Murton that became The Old Oak during filming was a disused pub previously known as The Victoria.

== Release ==
The film premiered in main competition at the 2023 Cannes Film Festival on 26 May 2023. It was also invited at the 28th Busan International Film Festival in 'Icon' section and was screened on 5 October 2023.

StudioCanal UK released the film in the United Kingdom and Ireland on 29 September 2023, and Le Pacte released the film in France on 25 October 2023.

== Reception ==
=== Critical response ===
On Rotten Tomatoes, the film holds an approval rating of 81% based on 80 reviews, with an average rating of 7/10. The site's critics consensus read: "Imbued with the fiercely humanistic spirit that has defined Ken Loach's filmography, The Old Oak serves as a fitting - albeit somewhat sentimental - finale to a remarkable career." On Metacritic, the film has a score of 69 out of 100, based on 23 critics, indicating "generally favourable" reviews.

For Variety, Owen Gleiberman wrote the film "Shines a Vital Light on Working-Class British Racism Until It Succumbs to Soft-Hearted Wish-Fulfillment. Dave Turner gives a lived-in performance as a pub proprietor trying to do the right thing, but Loach's latest look at working-class despair turns into too much of a progressive fairy tale."

In The Guardian, Peter Bradshaw named it as one of his films of the year, and the performance of Ebla Mari as one of the best in a supporting role on film in 2023. The Observer's Duncan Campbell called the film - Loach's last - "a stirring and fitting farewell to a remarkable, brave and uncompromising career."

=== Accolades ===
| Award | Date of ceremony | Category | Recipient(s) | Result | Ref. |
|---|---|---|---|---|---|
| British Academy of Film and Television Arts | 18 February 2024 | Outstanding British Film | Ken Loach, Rebecca O'Brien and Paul Laverty | Nominated | |
| Cannes Film Festival | 27 May 2023 | Palme d'Or | Ken Loach | Nominated | |
| Calgary International Film Festival | 3 October 2023 | Audience Choice, Special Presentations Program | The Old Oak | Won | |
| Cinéfest Sudbury International Film Festival | 28 September 2023 | Audience Choice for Best Feature Film | The Old Oak | Won | |
| Lumière Awards | 22 January 2024 | Best International Co-Production | The Old Oak | Nominated | |
| Valladolid International Film Festival | 28 October 2023 | Golden Spike | The Old Oak | Nominated | |
| Valladolid International Film Festival | 28 October 2023 | Best Actor | Dave Turner | Won | |
| Valladolid International Film Festival | 28 October 2023 | Audience Award | The Old Oak | Won | |
