= Tank Standing Buffalo =

Tank Standing Buffalo is a Canadian artist from Calgary, Alberta. He is most noted for his 2023 animated short film MONSTR, which was included in HBO Max's animation anthology Only You: An Animated Shorts Collection.

== Background ==
He is of mixed Potawatomi and Black Canadian descent, and his mother is a member of the Caldwell First Nation in Southwestern Ontario. He had a troubled childhood and spent some time in detention as a young offender following a robbery.

== Career ==
His 2020 short film RKLSS centred on his time as a young offender, shedding light, particularly on the inhumanity of solitary confinement practices, and premiered at the 2020 Toronto International Film Festival.

He followed up in 2022 with SAVJ, a prequel film about the childhood experience of being taken into foster care that first set him on the path to his troubled teenage years. The film featured Corey Feldman voicing Standing Buffalo's character and premiered at the 2022 Calgary International Film Festival.

MONSTR centred on his experience following his wife's death of a brain aneurysm, when he confronted his inner demons walking in the forest along the British Columbia Coast before taking a year-long apprenticeship with a wood carver. The film premiered as part of HBO Max's Only You in March 2023.

In addition to animation, Standing Buffalo has also worked in sculpture, illustration, tattoo art and tiki mug design.

== Awards ==
In May 2023, he was named one of the recipients of the inaugural Jeff Barnaby Grant for emerging Indigenous filmmakers from Netflix and the imagineNATIVE Film and Media Arts Festival.

At the 2023 Calgary International Film Festival, MONSTR won the Devon Bolton Memorial Award for best Alberta short film and the Audience Choice Award for best Alberta short film.

In 2021, he was awarded the RBC Emerging Artist Award, a Cultural Leaders Legacy Award from Calgary Arts Development.
