= Swan Song (2023 film) =

2023 Canadian documentary film by Chelsea McMullan

- Release poster
- Directed by: Chelsea McMullan
- Written by: Chelsea McMullan; Sean O'Neill
- Produced by: Sean O'Neill
- Starring: Karen Kain; Jurgita Dronina; Shaelynn Estrada
- Cinematography: Tess Girard; Shady Hanna
- Edited by: Brendan Mills
- Music by: Katie Stelmanis
- Production companies: Canadian Broadcasting Corporation; Mercury Films; Quiet Ghost; Visitor Media
- Distributed by: Blue Ice Docs; CBC Television
- Release date: September 9, 2023 (TIFF)
- Running time: 100 minutes
- Country: Canada
- Language: English

Swan Song is a 2023 Canadian documentary film, directed by Chelsea McMullan.

== Summary ==
The film profiles National Ballet of Canada artistic director and former dancer Karen Kain as she directs a production of Swan Lake for the company as her final project before retiring.

== Cast ==
- Karen Kain
- Robert Binet
- Jurgita Dronina
- Shaelynn Estrada
- Siphe November
- Genevieve Nabity-Penn
- Tene Ward
- Arielle Mirales
- Maria Kochetkova

== Production ==
Actress Neve Campbell is an executive producer. She remarked that she took on this project as Karen Kain was always an idol of hers.

== Release ==
The film premiered at the 2023 Toronto International Film Festival, and screened at the 2023 Cinéfest Sudbury International Film Festival, the 2023 Calgary International Film Festival, the 2023 BFI London Film Festival and the 2023 Vancouver International Film Festival.

An expanded four-part television version aired in November 2023 on CBC Television and CBC Gem.

== Reception ==
On the review aggregator website Rotten Tomatoes, 86% of 21 critics' reviews are positive, with an average rating of 7.2/10. Metacritic, which uses a weighted average, assigned the film a score of 70 out of 100, based on 4 critics, indicating "generally favorable" reviews.

Lisa Kennedy of Variety wrote: "Director Chelsea McMullan, along with co-writer and producer Sean O'Neill, have crafted a work that echoes the artform's grace and rigor, physical demands and details. As one of the film's achingly sympathetic subjects Shaelynn Estrada confesses, it also explores the deep love and sometimes equally deep antipathy dancers can have for their chosen profession." The Guardian's Leslie Felperin awarded the "nuanced" film three stars out of five, describing it as "an interesting snapshot of an art form struggling, like so many others, with changing expectations about representation."

=== Awards ===
At Cinéfest, the film was runner-up for the Audience Choice award for Best Documentary Film.

At Calgary, the film won the award for Best Canadian Feature Documentary.

The film was the winner of the Rogers Best Canadian Documentary Award at the Toronto Film Critics Association Awards 2023.

The film was the winner of the 2024 Canadian Screen Award for Best Sound Design in a Documentary, and the 2024 DGC Allan King Award for Best Documentary Film.
