= Echo to Delta =

2023 Canadian drama film

- French: Écho à Delta
- Directed by: Patrick Boivin
- Written by: Jean-Daniel Desroches
- Produced by: Stéphane Tanguay; Cédric Bourdeau
- Starring: Isak Guinard Butt
- Cinematography: Patrick Boivin
- Edited by: Elric Robichon
- Music by: Alexis Le May; Michèle Motard
- Production company: Productions Kinesis
- Distributed by: Filmoption International
- Release date: September 18, 2023 (Cinéfest)
- Running time: 91 minutes
- Country: Canada
- Language: French

Echo to Delta (French: Écho à Delta) is a Canadian drama film, directed by Patrick Boivin and released in 2023. The film stars Isak Guinard Butt as Étienne, a young boy who struggles to accept his younger brother David (Elliot Cormier)'s death in a storm, and sets out to prove that David was actually abducted by aliens.

The cast also includes Maxim Gaudette, Ines Feghouli, Catherine De Léan, Martin Dubreuil, Baptiste Charest, Rosemay Lefebvre, Aksel Leblanc, Daniel Gadouas, Sylvain Giroux Jr., Cat Lemieux and Nicolas Paquin.

The film premiered in September 2023 at the 2023 Cinéfest Sudbury International Film Festival, before going into commercial release in March 2024.
