= Close to You (2023 film) =

Film by Dominic Savage

- Theatrical release poster
- Directed by: Dominic Savage
- Written by: Dominic Savage
- Story by: Dominic Savage; Elliot Page
- Produced by: Krishnendu Majumdar; Richard Yee; Daniel Bekerman; Chris Yurkovich; Dominic Savage; Elliot Page
- Starring: Elliot Page; Hillary Baack; Peter Outerbridge; Wendy Crewson
- Cinematography: Catherine Lutes
- Edited by: David Charap
- Music by: Oliver Coates; Dominic Savage
- Production companies: Kindred Spirit; Rolling Dice; Me + You Productions; Good Question Media; Pageboy Productions
- Distributed by: Mongrel Media (Canada); Vertigo Releasing (United Kingdom)
- Release dates: September 10, 2023 (TIFF); August 16, 2024 (Canada); August 30, 2024 (United Kingdom)
- Running time: 99 minutes
- Countries: Canada; United Kingdom
- Language: English
- Box office: $72,994

Close to You is a 2023 drama film directed by Dominic Savage and starring Elliot Page, Hillary Baack, Peter Outerbridge, and Wendy Crewson. Savage and Page wrote the story together and both acted as producers.

The film premiered at the 2023 Toronto International Film Festival, and was released on August 16, 2024, in Canada. It was released in the United Kingdom on August 23, 2024.

== Plot ==
Sam, a trans man living in Kensington Market is planning to visit his family in Cobourg to celebrate his father's birthday. Sam has avoided visiting Cobourg for several years and worries that things may go badly while he's there. Sam's roommate, Emily, tries to convince Sam to stay home and watch movies with her, and though tempted, Sam ultimately turns Emily down, and heads out to Union Station to board a VIA train bound for Cobourg.

On the train, Sam runs into Katherine, an old friend of his from high school who is now married with two children. Sam and Katherine spend the remainder of the train ride catching up. Sam suggests they get coffee together while he's in town, but Katherine turns him down.

After arriving in Cobourg, Sam walks to his parents' house to attend the birthday party.

Despite having initially turned him down, Katherine finds Sam, and later the two go for a walk together near the beach and discuss their past.

Back at Sam's parents' house, Sam gets into a verbal altercation with his sister's fiancé Paul and storms out. But before getting on the VIA train back to Toronto, Sam meets up with Katherine and asks her to come with him. She turns him down, but agrees to stay in touch.

Soon, Katherine visits Sam in Toronto and has sex with him before returning to Cobourg.

The film ends with Sam pensively getting dressed and preparing breakfast, bookending the film's opening scenes.

== Cast ==
- Elliot Page as Sam
- Hillary Baack as Katherine
- Peter Outerbridge as Jim, Sam's dad
- Wendy Crewson as Miriam, Sam's mum
- Janet Porter as Kate, Sam's sister
- Alex Paxton-Beesley as Megan, Sam's sister
- Daniel Maslany as Michael, Sam's brother
- Sook-Yin Lee as Emily, Sam's roommate
- Andrew Bushell as Stephen, Kate's partner
- Jim Watson as Daniel, Katherine's husband
- David Reale as Paul, Megan's fiancé
- Amanda Richer as Margot

== Production ==
Alongside Savage and Page, producers also include Krishnendu Majumdar and Richard Yee for their Me + You Productions banner and Daniel Bekerman and Chris Yurkovich, via Good Question Media. Financing comes from Kindred Spirit with Anita Gou and Sam Intili executive producing with Rolling Dice's Nia Vazirani, and Matt Jordan Smith of PageBoy Productions. The project included high levels of improvisation and Page told The Guardian the experience was "a highlight of my life as an actor."

=== Filming ===
Shot by cinematographer Catherine Lutes, principal photography took place in Canada and wrapped by June 2023.

== Release ==
The film had its premiere at the Toronto International Film Festival on September 10, 2023, and received a gala screening at the 2023 Cinéfest Sudbury International Film Festival. In January 2024, Greenwich Entertainment acquired US distribution rights to the film.

It was released in the United States and Canada (Mongrel Media) on August 16, 2024, and was released in the United Kingdom (Vertigo Releasing) two weeks later on August 30. The movie had its streaming debut on Netflix on November 15, 2024.

== Reception ==
=== Critical response ===
On the review aggregator website Rotten Tomatoes, 68% of 62 critics' reviews are positive, with an average rating of 6/10. The website's consensus reads: "A passion project for Elliot Page that benefits from his naturalism, Close to You's improvisational scripting yields dramatically uneven but ultimately moving results." Metacritic, which uses a weighted average, assigned the film a score of 55 out of 100, based on 17 critics, indicating "mixed or average" reviews. Page's performance was widely praised, even by the film's detractors.

Matt Zoller Seitz of RogerEbert.com gave the film three out of four stars and wrote, "It's raw and often powerful—less of a carefully shaped drama than the equivalent of a series of boxes filled with explosive material being slung about. It's less concerned with winning points for neatness than in letting scenes unfold in an unflinchingly immediate way."

=== Awards ===
Award / Film Festival	Date of ceremony	Category	Recipient(s)	Result	Ref(s)
British Independent Film Awards	December 8, 2024	Best Lead Performance	Elliot Page	Nominated	
Calgary International Film Festival	September 25, 2023	Special Jury Citation for Performance, International Narrative Feature Competition	Elliot Page	Won	
Cinéfest Sudbury International Film Festival	September 28, 2023	Inspiring Voices and Perspectives	Dominic Savage	Won	
GLAAD Media Awards	March 27, 2025	Outstanding Film – Limited Theatrical Release	Close to You	Nominated	
The Queerties	March 11, 2025	Film Performance	Elliot Page	Nominated	
