= Christopher at Sea =

- Directed by: Tom CJ Brown
- Written by: Tom CJ Brown
- Produced by: Amanda Miller, Hanna Stolarski, Emily-Jane Brown, Nick Read, Pierre Boivin, Constance Le Scouarnec
- Production companies: Psyop; Miyu Productions
- Release date: 2022
- Running time: 20 minutes
- Countries: United States; United Kingdom; France

Christopher at Sea is a 2022 animated short film directed by Tom CJ Brown. The 20-minute short is a queer drama about identity and self-discovery and it premiered at the Venice Film Festival, where it received a nomination for the Venice Horizons Award. The film has been featured in a number of international film festivals, receiving accolades such as the Bucheon International Animation Festival, and is now qualified for the 95th Academy Awards in the eligible films under the category Best Animated Short Film.

== Plot ==
A young man embarks on a transatlantic journey as a passenger on a cargo ship and discovers deep feelings of solitude, fantasy and obsession.

== Reception ==
Since its release, the film has been selected in various festivals around the world:

Year	Festivals	Award/Category	Status
2022	Venice Film Festival	Venice Horizons Award	Nominated
2022	Uppsala International Short Film Festival	Grand Prix - International Competition	Nominated
2022	Bucheon International Animation Festival	Special Distinction Prize	Won
2022	Seminci Film Festival	Punto de Encuentro Award	Nominated
