= Patrick Boivin =

Canadian filmmaker and animator

- Born: 1975 (age 50–51); Montreal, Quebec, Canada
- Occupations: Filmmaker, animator

Patrick Boivin (born 1975) is a Canadian filmmaker and animator. In addition to directing, he is often involved in the lighting, editing, animation, special effects and even music in his films.

== Career ==
His short film Ça pis tout l’reste (That, and everything else) was chosen by Quebec Gold as one of the top 10 short films from Quebec in 2008. Boivin was also one of the group of nine writers who produced an experimental sketch comedy television series for Télé-Québec titled Phylactère Cola, which aired in 2002 and 2003.

His films have been featured at numerous international film festivals around the world, including the Montreal World Film Festival, the Commonwealth Film Festival (UK) and the Festival de Namur (Belgium). Boivin started his creative career by drawing comic books and, in his words, “quickly discovered that it was faster to tell a story with video." He cites Tom Waits, Roy Andersson, Federico Fellini and Paul Thomas Anderson as influences on his style.

He won a Gémeaux Award for Best Direction in a Comedy Series in 2002 for Phylactère Cola, and his short film Radio received a Jutra Award nomination for Best Live Action Short Film at the 8th Jutra Awards in 2006.

Many of Boivin's short films have been released to YouTube. He created the stop motion videos for the songs "King of the Dogs" by Iggy Pop and "Playboy" by Indochine. He also created viral clips such as Iron Baby, Iron Man vs Bruce Lee and Dragon Baby. In 2011, Boivin developed his first video game for iOS entitled Crottey Bunny's Scratch N' Dance under the name Monsieur Boivin, a company he started with his brother.

== Filmography ==
=== Shorts ===
- La Lettre
- Radio
- White
- I shot your ex-girlfriend
- Cuts Kill Culture
- Paranoland
- Nosferatu Rising
- The First Spaceshit on the Moon
- Redite
- Jazz With a General Problem
- Batman vs Joker (BBoy Joker)
- Iron Man vs Bruce Lee
- Black Ox Skateboard
- Mandalorian Dance
- Bumblebee boy
- Michael Jackson vs Mr. Bean
- Ninjas UnBoxing
- La Fin du Neoliberalisme/ No Big Deal
- IRON BABY
- AT-AT Day Afternoon
- LEGO Bionicle Stars shorts
- Official Cars 2 trailer in Lego
- Dragon Baby
- Happy Meal

=== Features ===
- Fall, Finally (Enfin l'automne) -- 2011
- Bunker -- 2014
- Echo to Delta (Écho à Delta) -- 2023
- The Clown (Le Queloune)
