= So What If the Goats Die =

- Qu'importe si les bêtes meurent
- Directed by: Sofia Alaoui
- Written by: Sofia Alaoui
- Produced by: Sofia Alaoui, Margaux Lorier
- Starring: Saïd Ouabi, Fouad Oughaou, Moha Oughaou
- Cinematography: Noé Bach
- Edited by: Héloïse Pelloquet
- Music by: Amine Bouhafa
- Release date: January 2020 (Sundance)
- Running time: 23 minutes
- Countries: Morocco, France
- Language: Berber

So What If the Goats Die (French: Qu'importe si les bêtes meurent), is a 2020 Moroccan short film directed by Sofia Alaoui. It was screened at a number of international film festivals including the Clermont-Ferrand International Short Film Festival, the Sundance Film Festival, and the Namur International Francophone Film Festival, winning multiple awards. In 2023, Alaoui released a feature film based on the short titled Animalia.

== Synopsis ==
In the Atlas Mountains, Abdellah, a young shepherd, and his father are stuck in their sheepfold because of the snow. Their livestock are dying, and Abdellah has to get food from a village more than a day's walk away. With his mule, he arrives at the village and discovers that it is deserted because of a curious event.

== Cast ==
- Saïd Ouabi (Lunatic)
- Fouad Oughaou (Abdellah)
- Moha Oughaou (Father)
- Oumaïma Oughaou (Itto)
