= Face to Face with David =

Canadian television talk show

- Series title card
- Genre: Talk show
- Created by: David Oulton
- Directed by: Candace Schmidt
- Presented by: David Oulton
- Country of origin: Canada
- No. of seasons: 5
- No. of episodes: 78

Production
- Executive producers: David Oulton; Lisa McGillivray
- Production locations: Calgary, Alberta
- Cinematography: Jose Luis Gonzalez
- Running time: 22-26 minutes

Original release
- Network: Amazon Prime Video; Slice; OUTtv
- Release: July 14, 2020 – February 4, 2024

Face to Face with David is a Canadian television talk show, which premiered in 2020 on Amazon Prime Video. Hosted by actor David Oulton, the show features Oulton interviewing celebrities, through videoconferencing software due to the COVID-19 pandemic in Canada.

The show has been characterized as an LGBTQ-oriented talk show, as Oulton is openly gay and several of his early guests were also members of the LGBTQ community, although Oulton has clarified that the show is not limited to LGBTQ people or topics. The show was launched as a casual project through Oulton's social media profiles, before being picked up by Amazon Prime after a month.

In May 2021, the series was picked up for broadcast in Canada by OutTV. In June 2021, Corus Entertainment began airing the series on Slice. It began airing on the Oprah Winfrey Network and DejaView in Canada in August 2021. It is also available to stream on StackTV.

In South Africa the series is available on Showmax, TVNZ in New Zealand, and various other networks globally.

In 2022, alongside its renewal of the show for a fifth season, OutTV also announced the acquisition of Who's There?, a panel talk show in which Oulton moderates a roundtable discussion between various guests.

In December 2022, the series became available in the United States on Amazon Freevee, Roku, Tubi and various other video on demand platforms.

The series was cancelled in 2024 by OUTtv.

== Awards ==
The series received a nomination for Best Lifestyle or Information series at the 47th annual Rosie Awards, presented by the Alberta Media Production Industries Association.

Oulton received a nomination for Best Host at the 48th annual Rosie Awards for his interview on the Season 4 premiere episode with Raven Symone and her wife Miranda Maday.

For his work in television, specifically Face to Face with David, Oulton was named amongst Avenue Magazine's Calgary 2023 Top 40 Under 40.

== Podcast Spin-off ==
In January 2025, a podcast version of the series title Face to Face with David | The Vault premiered. The spin-off revisits and airs interviews from the series and was made available on Apple Podcasts, Spotify, iHeart Radio, Amazon Music and others. The podcast airs each guest interview as a standalone, rather than the full episode aired on broadcast television. The initial episodes featured the full interviews with Miriam Margolyes, Jimmy Carr, David Archuleta, and Dingdong Dantes.

== Controversy ==
In August 2023 the series received criticism after announcing that Alberta premier Danielle Smith would be a guest. In February 2024, Oulton publicly endorsed Smith's policy proposals regarding the province's LGBTQ+ and transgender individuals, including restrictions on gender reassignment surgery and access to puberty blockers for minors. Oulton said the policies will "force conversations and transparency" and that Smith "did a very good job in striking a balance." As a result, OUTtv announced Face to Face with David would be immediately removed from the network and effectively cancelled. The network declined to finish airing the fifth season, although the episodes eventually aired on Corus-owned stations.

Following his endorsement Oulton faced severe backlash, including threats of violence, and was subsequently fired from several upcoming projects he was set to appear on. Alberta opposition leader Rachel Notley also criticized his stance on the topic.
