= Ceremony (2026 film) =

2026 Canadian documentary film

- Directed by: Banchi Hanuse
- Written by: Banchi Hanuse; Jessica Mayhew
- Produced by: Banchi Hanuse
- Starring: Qwaxw Siwallace; Megan Moody; Deric Snow
- Cinematography: Luke Connor; Jean-Philippe Marquis
- Edited by: Erin Cumming; Sarah Taylor
- Music by: Jesse Zubot
- Production company: Smayaykila Films
- Distributed by: Netflix
- Release date: March 14, 2026 (SXSW)
- Running time: 83 minutes
- Country: Canada
- Languages: English; Nuxalk

Ceremony is a Canadian documentary film, directed by Banchi Hanuse and released in 2026. The film profiles the Nuxalk people of British Columbia, as they use various cultural strategies, including both traditional ceremonies and modern tools such as broadcasting and activism, to cope with and resolve the environmental decline of the culturally significant ooligan fish.

The film premiered at the 2026 South by Southwest Film & TV Festival, where it won the Audience Award for the Documentary Spotlight section. It had its Canadian premiere at the Hot Docs Canadian International Documentary Festival, where it won the special jury prize from the Best Canadian Feature Documentary jury.

It was subsequently screened at the 73rd Sydney Film Festival, where it won the First Nations Award.

The film was shortlisted for the Jean-Marc Vallée DGC Discovery Award at the Directors Guild of Canada awards in 2026.

At the 2026 Vancouver International Film Festival, it won the Tides Award for Best Canadian Documentary, and the Audience Award for the Showcase program.

In November 2026, Netflix acquired distribution rights to the documentary, planning to release it sometime in 2027.
