= Animalia (film) =

2023 film by Sofia Alaoui

- Theatrical release poster
- French: Parmi nous
- Literally: Among Us
- Directed by: Sofia Alaoui
- Written by: Sofia Alaoui
- Produced by: Margaux Lorier; Toufik Ayadi; Christophe Barral
- Starring: Oumaïma Barid; Mehdi Dehbi; Fouad Oughaou
- Cinematography: Noé Bach
- Edited by: Héloïse Pelloquet
- Music by: Amine Bouhafa
- Production companies: Wrong Films; SRAB Films; Dounia Productions; Jiango Films; ARTE France Cinéma
- Distributed by: Ad Vitam Distribution
- Release dates: 20 January 2023 (Sundance); 9 August 2023 (France)
- Running time: 91 minutes
- Countries: France; Morocco
- Languages: French; Arabic; Berber

Animalia is a 2023 French-Moroccan science fiction film directed by Sofia Alaoui in her feature directorial debut, based on Alaoui's short film So What If the Goats Die. The movie follows Itto (Oumaïma Barid), a pregnant woman who attempts to reunite with her husband Amine (Mehdi Dehbi) as extraterrestrial occurrences in Morocco cause the country to descend into chaos.

The film had its world premiere at the 2023 Sundance Film Festival, on 20 January 2023. The film had a positive reception, with critics particularly praising the direction, the performances of Barid and Dehbi, and the score.

== Cast ==
- Oumaïma Barid as Itto
- Mehdi Dehbi as Amine
- Fouad Oughaou as Fouad
- Souad Khouyi as Hajar

== Production ==
The principal photography concluded in November 2021 after thirty five days of filming. Animalia is produced by Wrong Films and SRAB Films, and co-produced by ARTE France Cinéma and the Moroccan companies Jiango Films and Dounia Productions. The film was produced under the working title Parmi nous (lit. 'Among Us'). International sales are handled by Totem Films.

== Release ==
Animalia had its world premiere at the 2023 Sundance Film Festival, on 20 January 2023. It was theatrically released in France by Ad Vitam Distribution on 9 August 2023.

== Reception ==
On the review aggregator website Rotten Tomatoes, the film holds a 100% approval rating based on 28 critics' reviews, with an average rating of 7.8/10.

At the 2023 Calgary International Film Festival, the film won the award for Best International Feature Film.
