= Omar Mouallem =

Canadian writer

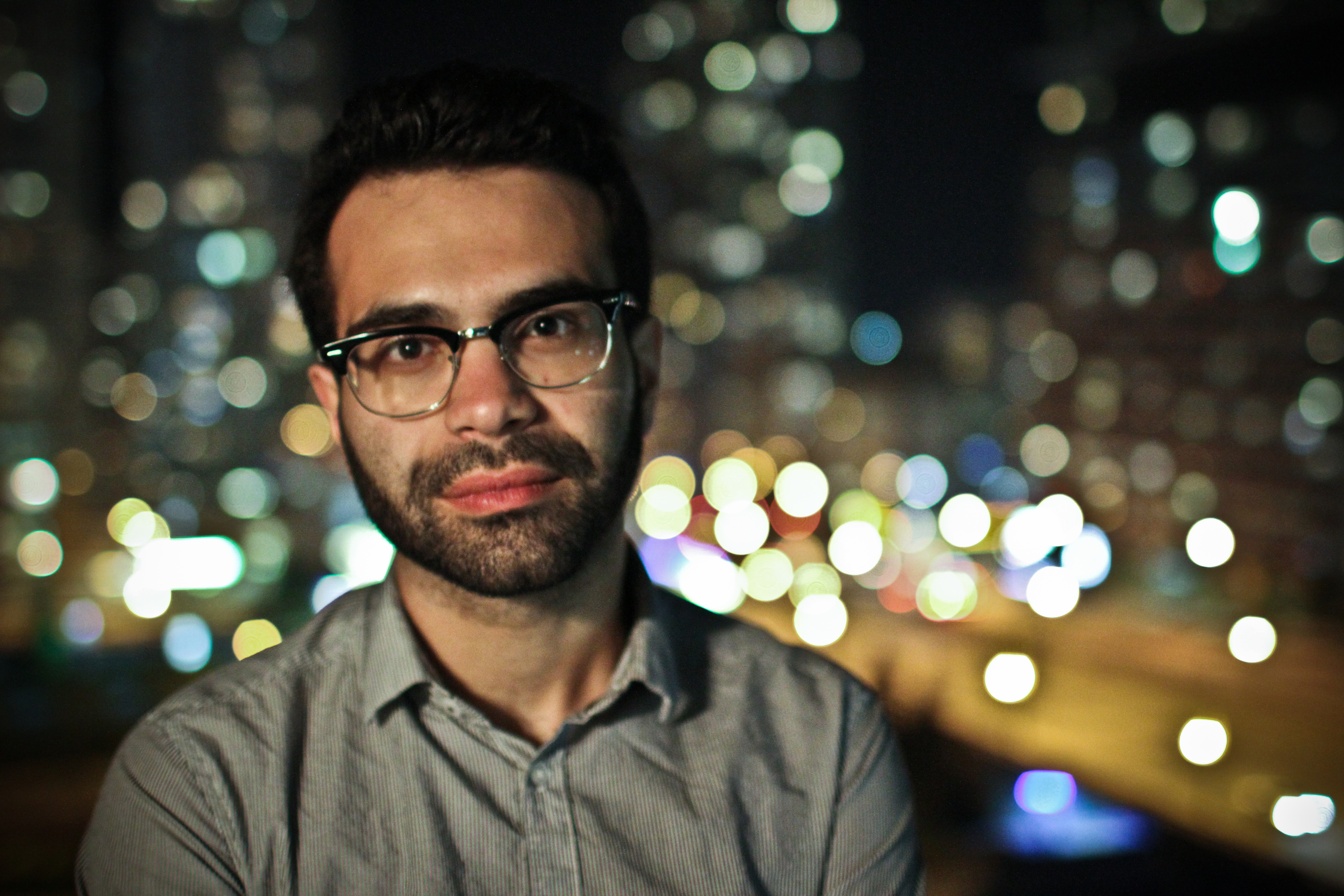
- Born: September 13, 1985 (age 41); Slave Lake, Alberta, Canada
- Occupations: Writer, Filmmaker, Educator

Omar Mouallem is a Canadian writer and filmmaker. He has contributed to Wired, The Guardian, The New Yorker, and Rolling Stone. His essays and features have garnered him recognition from the Canadian National Magazine Awards and Alberta Literary Awards. He co-authored a book about the 2016 Fort McMurray wildfire titled Inside the Inferno: A Firefighter's Story of the Brotherhood that Saved Fort McMurray (published by Simon & Schuster Canada). His book Praying to the West: How Muslims Shaped the Americas, a travelogue centred around 13 mosques, was named one of the best books of 2021 by The Globe and Mail. It was awarded the 2022 Wilfrid Eggelston Nonfiction Award by the Alberta Literary Awards.

He has won three Canadian National Magazine Awards, including best profile in 2014 for the Eighteen Bridges story, "The Kingdom of Haymour", which profiled a man who took the Canadian Embassy in Beirut hostage in the 1970s over a British Columbia land dispute. The article partially inspired the 2020 documentary film Eddy’s Kingdom, for which Mouallem was a key interviewee.

Mouallem directed and produced two documentaries, 2019's Digging in the Dirt, a CBC coproduction about a mental health crises in the Alberta oil sands workforce, and 2021's The Last Baron, a first-person film about the unlikely connection between Lebanon's civil war and the Canadian fast-food chain Burger Baron. After premiering on CBC Gem, it gained notable popularity and it was heralded as one of the "best Canadian food documentaries" by enRoute magazine. Mouallem announced that the short film would be expanded into a feature documentary retitled The Lebanese Burger Mafia and released in 2023.

In 2013, he won Edmonton's Emerging Artist Award and served as the Edmonton Public Library's writer in residence. In 2022, he was awarded an Emerging Artists Award from the Lieutenant Governor of Alberta.
