= Saint Louis Blues (2009 film) =

- Directed by: Dyana Gaye
- Screenplay by: Dyana Gaye
- Produced by: Andolfi
- Starring: Umban Gomez de Kset (Médoune Sall) Anne Jeanine Barboza (Souki) Bigue N’Doye (Antoinette Barry) Antoine Diandy (Malick) Adja Fall
- Cinematography: Irina Lubtchansky
- Edited by: Gwen Mallauran
- Music by: Baptiste Bouquin
- Release date: 2009
- Running time: 48'
- Countries: France; Senegal

Saint Louis Blues (French:Rainbow Harvest) is a 2009 film.

== Synopsis ==
Dakar, Senegal. Summer is coming to its end. During the journey from Dakar to Saint Louis, the fates of the passen.
