= Boat People (2023 film) =

2023 Canadian animated short film

- Directed by: Thao Lam; Kjell Boersma
- Written by: Thao Lam; Kjell Boersma
- Produced by: Justine Pimlott; Jelena Popovic
- Narrated by: Thao Lam
- Production company: National Film Board of Canada
- Release date: April 27, 2023
- Running time: 9 minutes
- Country: Canada
- Language: English

Boat People is a 2023 Canadian animated short film written and directed by Thao Lam and Kjell Boersma.

Adapted from Lam's 2020 book The Paper Boat, the nine-minute film centres on the experiences of Vietnamese refugees, called "boat people", who fled Vietnam through the sea at the end of the Vietnam War in 1975.

== Plot ==
As a child in Vietnam, Thao's mother would rescue ants from bowls of sugar water—a small act of compassion that later took on new meaning. Boat People is an animated documentary that uses this metaphor to explore one family's experience navigating the challenges of their historical journey.

== Release ==
The film premiered in April 2023 at the Stuttgart International Festival of Animated Film.

In 2024 it was selected for broadcast on PBS's POV Shorts series in the United States, and was selected as a Staff Pick on Vimeo.

== Awards ==
Award	Date of ceremony	Category	Recipient(s)	Result	Ref(s)
New Orleans Film Festival	2023	Helen Hill Award for Animated Short	Thao Lam, Kjell Boersma	Won	
New Orleans Film Festival	2023	Audience Award for Animated Short	Thao Lam, Kjell Boersma	Won	
Chicago International Children's Film Festival	2023	Milos Stehlik Global Impact Award	Thao Lam, Kjell Boersma	Won	
Spark Animation Festival	2023	Diversity Award	Thao Lam, Kjell Boersma	Won	
Calgary International Film Festival	2023	Grand Jury Prize – Animated Short	Thao Lam, Kjell Boersma	Won	
Canadian Film Festival	2024	Best Animated Short	Thao Lam, Kjell Boersma	Won	
