= Thao Lam =

Vietnamese-Canadian children's author and illustrator

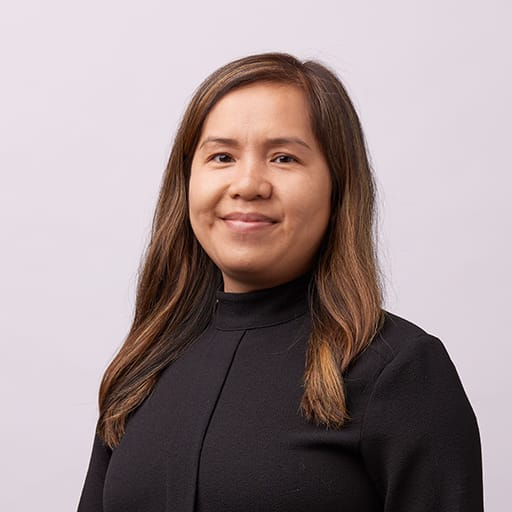
- Thao Lam in 2022
- Occupations: Author, Illustrator
- Writing career
- Genre: Children's picture books
- Website: thaolam.com

Thao Lam is a Vietnamese-Canadian childrens' author and illustrator who lives in Toronto, Ontario. Her works are completed in a collage style. Her newest book, Everybelly, received a Kirkus Prize on October 9, 2025 and her previous book, One Giant Leap, was shortlisted for a 2024 Governor General's Literary Award.

The animated film, Boat People, co-directed with animator Kjell Boersma based on Lam's 2020 book The Paper Boat, won the award for Best Animated Short Film at the 2023 Calgary International Film Festival.

== Early life and education ==
Lam came to Canada with her parents at the age of 3, as a refugee from Vietnam. She credits picture books for helping her settle into life in Canada, particularly the works of children's author Eric Carle and David Wiesner.

Lam studied illustration at Toronto's Sheridan College.

== Works ==
- Lam, Thao (2016). Skunk on a string. Toronto, ON: Owlkids Books. ISBN 978-1-77147-131-2. OCLC 915500644.
- Lam, Thao (2018). Wallpaper. Toronto, Ontario: Owlkids Books. ISBN 978-1-77147-283-8. OCLC 990234349.
- Lam, Thao (2019). My Cat Looks Like My Dad. Toronto, Ontario: Owlkids Books. ISBN 978-1-77147-351-4. OCLC 1049797774.
- Lam, Thao (2020). The Paper Boat. Toronto, Ontario: Owlkids Books. ISBN 978-1771473637. OCLC 1131689156.
- Lam, Thao (2021). THAO: A Picture Book. Toronto, Ontario: Owlkids Books. ISBN 978-1771474320. OCLC 1159471949.
- Lam, Thao (2022). The Line In The Sand. Toronto, Ontario: Owlkids Books. ISBN 978-1771475709. OCLC 1287285495.
- Lam, Thao (2023). Happy Birthday To Me. Toronto, Ontario: Groundwood Books. ISBN 978-1773068725. OCLC 1322065170.
- Lam, Tham (2024). One Giant Leap. Toronto, Ontario: Owlkids Books. ISBN 978-1771475990.
- Lam, Thao (2025). Everybelly. Toronto, Ontario: Groundwood Books. ISBN 978-1773067643.

== Films ==
Boat People (2023)

- Description: As a child in Vietnam, Thao’s mother often rescued ants from bowls of sugar water. Years later they would return the favor. Boat People is an animated documentary that uses a striking metaphor to trace one family’s flight across the turbulent waters of history.
- Co-Directors: Thao Lam and Kjell Boersma
- Produced by: The National Film Board of Canada, 2023

== Awards and nominations ==
=== Book Awards ===
Everybelly

- Kirkus Prize, Young Readers Literature, 2025

The Line in the Sand

- A Kirkus 150 Most Anticipated Fall Books, 2022
- A CBC Best Canadian Picture Book of 2022
- A Bank Street College of Education Best Children's Book of the Year, 2022
- A Book Riot Must-Read Picture Book of 2022

THAO: A Picture Book

- A Junior Library Guild selection, 2021
- A CBC Best Canadian Picture Book, 2021
- A New York Public Library Vibrant Voices selection, 2022
- A Bank Street College of Education Best Children’s Book of the Year, 2022
- A USBBY Outstanding Books List selection, 2022
- A CCBC Best Books for Kids and Teens selection, 2021

The Paper Boat

- A School Library Journal Best Book of 2020
- A Kirkus Best Picture Book of 2020
- A New York Public Library 100 Best Books for Kids selection, 2020
- A Booklist Editors' Choice, 2020
- A Globe and Mail Best Book of 2020
- A Canadian Children's Book Centre Favourite Book of 2020
- A Bulletin of the Center for Children’s Books Blue Ribbon Selection, 2020
- A CBC Best Canadian Picture Book of 2020
- A USBBY Outstanding International Books List selection, 2021
- An Elizabeth Mrazik-Cleaver Canadian Picture Book Award Honour Book, 2020
- An International Board on Books for Young People Silent Books Collection selection, 2020
- A Kids Book Choice Awards Best Book of the Year: 3rd–4th Grade nominee, 2021
- A CCBC Best Book for Kids and Teens starred selection, 2021
- A TD Summer Reading Club Top Recommended Read, 2022

My Cat Looks Like My Dad

- A Quill & Quire Cover of the Year, 2019
- A Booklist Editors' Choice, 2019
- A Canadian Children's Book Centre Best Books for Kids and Teens selection, 2019

Wallpaper

- Cybils Children’s and Young Adult Bloggers’ Literary Awards – Shortlisted
- A Kirkus Best Children's Book of 2018
- A New York Public Library 100 Best Books for Kids selection, 2018
- An Elizabeth Mrazik-Cleaver Canadian Picture Book Award nominee, 2018
- An International Board on Books for Young People Silent Books Collection selection

Skunk on a String

- A Capitol Choices: Noteworthy Books for Children and Teens nominee
- A Kirkus Best Picture Book of 2016
- A Canadian Children's Book Centre Best Books for Kids and Teens selection
- A Toronto Public Library First and Best List selection, 2016
- An International Board on Books for Young People Silent Books Collection selection

=== Film Awards ===
Awards for Boat People
Year	Award Name	Presenter
2023	Grand Jury Prize, Animated Short Film	Calgary International Animation Festival
2023	Best Canadian Animation Short	Vancouver Asian Film Festival
2023	Jury Winner for Best Animated Short	New Orleans Film Festival
2023	Audience Award for Animated Short	New Orleans Film Festival
2023	Milos Stehlik Global Impact Award Winner	Chicago International Children’s Film Festival
2023	Winner of Diversity Award	Spark Animation Festival
2023	Audience Award	Coronado Island Film Festival
2023	Best Animated Short	Coronado Island Film Festival
2024	Best Animated Short	Canadian Film Festival
