= Banchi Hanuse =

Canadian indigenous filmmaker

- Education: School of Art
- Known for: Documentary Film

Banchi Hanuse is a Nuxalk filmmaker from Canada.

== Early life and education ==
Hanuse holds a Bachelor of Arts in First Nations Studies from the University of British Columbia. She currently resides in Bella Coola.

Hanuse has worked at the National Film Board of Canada (NFB) as an associate producer and in other roles. Her most well known projects at the NFB include the Finding Dawn, directed by Christine Welsh and Our World, a digital storytelling workshop for remote Indigenous communities.

Hanuse also helped found Nuxalk Radio, a radio station based out of the Nuxalk village of Q'umk'uts' (Bella Coola).

== Filmography ==
- Cry Rock - 2010
- Uulx: The Scratcher - 2015
- Nuxalk Radio - 2020
- Behind the Facade - 2021
- Aitamaako'tamisskapi Natosi: Before the Sun - 2023
- Ceremony - 2026

=== Awards and nominations ===
- Nominated, Best Documentary Short, American Indian Film Festival (2010)
- Best Documentary Short, Vancouver Women in Film Festival (2010)
- Best Documentary Short Subject for Cry Rock, Yorkton Film Festival's Golden Sheaf Award (2011)
- Best Documentary Short for Cry Rock, Vancouver Women in Film Festival (2011)
- Sea to Sky Award for Nuxalk Radio, 2022 Vancouver International Film Festival
- Big Sky Award for Aitamaako'tamisskapi Natosi: Before the Sun, 2023 Big Sky Documentary Film Festival
- Audience Award, Documentary Spotlight for Ceremony, 2026 South by Southwest Film & TV Festival
- Special Jury Prize for Ceremony, 2026 Hot Docs Canadian International Documentary Festival
- First Nations Award for Ceremony, 2026 Sydney Film Festival
