= Kjell Boersma =

Canadian animator

Kjell Boersma is a Canadian animator. He is most noted for his 2017 short film Dam! The Story of Kit the Beaver, which was a Canadian Screen Award nominee for Best Animated Short Film at the 6th Canadian Screen Awards.

He has also directed the animated short films Monster Slayer (2016) and Boat People (2023), and has done visual effects work in the films Filth City and Someone Lives Here, and the web series True Dating Stories and The Amazing Gayl Pile.

Boat People, co-directed with children's writer Thao Lam based on Lam's 2020 book The Paper Boat, won the award for Best Animated Short Film at the 2023 Calgary International Film Festival.
