= Sofia Alaoui =

French-Moroccan director and screenwriter

- Born: 1990 (age 34–35); Casablanca
- Citizenship: Morocco
- Occupation(s): Film director, Screenwriter

Sofia Alaoui (born 1990 in Casablanca) is a French-Moroccan director and screenwriter. She is best known for her short film Qu'importe si les bêtes meurent.

== Biography ==
Born in Casablanca to a Moroccan father and a French mother, she grew up between Morocco and China. After graduating high school in Casablanca, she moved to Paris to study cinema. In 2017, she returned to Morocco to develop her own production company, Jiango Films.

Her first short fiction film, Kenza des choux, was screened at a number of festivals.

Her next film, Qu'importe si les bêtes meurent, was shot in the Atlas Mountains, featuring non-professional actors and dialogue exclusively in Tamazight. It won the Grand Jury Prize at the Sundance Film Festival in 2020, and the César Award for Best Fiction Short Film in 2021.

Alaoui's feature directorial debut, Animalia premiered at the 2023 Sundance Film Festival.

== Filmography ==
=== Feature films ===
- 2023: Animalia

=== Short films ===
- 2013 : Le rêve de Cendrillon
- 2015 : Les enfants de Naplouse (documentary broadcast on France 3 and TV5)
- 2018 : Kenza des choux
- 2019 : Les vagues ou rien
- 2020 : So What If the Goats Die
- 2020 : The Lake
