= Dallas International Film Festival =

Annual film festival in Dallas, TX

- Location: Dallas, Texas, U.S.
- Founded: 2007
- Hosted by: Dallas Film Society, Inc.
- Artistic director: James Faust
- Language: International
- Website: dallasfilm.org

The Dallas International Film Festival (DIFF Dallas) is an annual film festival that takes place in Dallas, Texas.

The 20th edition of the Dallas International Film Festival was held on April 23-30, 2026 at Cinépolis Luxury Cinemas Victory Park, the Texas Theatre and Virgin Hotels Dallas.

The Dallas International Film Festival 2025 was held on April 25-May 1, 2025.

Since its inception, the Dallas International Film Festival has contributed more than $1M in filmmaker awards, brought more than 2,000 filmmakers to Dallas, and screened more than 2,500 films from more than 50 countries.

DIFF Dallas, established as Dallas Film Society, Inc., is a 501(c)(3) nonprofit organization founded in 2006.

== History ==
2007

The Dallas International Film Festival began in 2007 as the AFI Dallas International Film Festival. The festival was cofounded by advertising executive Liener Temerlin and Deep Ellum Film Festival founder Michael Cain with the intention that "film should be placed on the same pedestal as all of the other arts". The Festival was held March 22 to April 1, 2007. The Opening Night Gala film was Steven Sawalich’s “Music Within” and Sarah Polley’s directorial debut, “Away From Her,” closed the fest. The newly inaugurated AFI Dallas Star was presented to Lauren Bacall, Jack Valenti, David Lynch, Sidney Pollack, Marvin Hamlisch, Alan and Marilyn Bergman, Sarah Polley and posthumously to Gregory Peck, who served as the first chairman of the AFI’s board.

2008

In 2008, the AFI DALLAS International Film Festival was held from March 27 to April 6, 2008. The Opening Night Gala film was Helen Hunt's directorial debut film, Then She Found Me. The Closing Night Gala film was Stuart Townsend's Battle in Seattle. Mickey Rooney attended a presentation of the 70th anniversary of Boys Town. Helen Hunt, Mickey Rooney, Charlize Theron and Todd Wagner each received the AFI DALLAS Star Award. Director Chris Wedge received the Tex Avery Animation Award, which honors lifetime achievement in animation filmmaking. Special guests included Robert DeNiro, Barry Levinson, Art Linson, Keke Palmer, Michelle Rodriguez, Stuart Townsend amongst others.

2009

The 3rd annual festival was held from March 26 to April 2, 2009. Kathryn Bigelow was presented with the AFI DALLAS Star Award before a screening of her film, The Hurt Locker.

Adrien Brody was presented with the AFI DALLAS Star Award prior to the screening of the Opening Night Gala film, The Brothers Bloom. Robert Towne received the AFI DALLAS Star Award at a presentation of the 35th anniversary of the film, Chinatown.

2010

In 2010, the name of the festival was changed to the Dallas International Film Festival after the contract with AFI expired. The 11-day 2010 Dallas International Film Festival, ran April 8-18th, its full schedule encompassing 153 features and shorts making up a total of 170 screenings. Opening Night has a unique look too, as the festival presented not just a single opening night film, but instead took over 8 screens at the Angelika Film Center and showcased multiple films from the festival. Amber Heard received the inaugural DALLAS Shining Star Award. Dallas Star Award Recipients were cinematographer Wally Pfister, Pixar animation wizard Brad Bird, writer/director John Lee Hancock and writer/director Frank Darabont. The 4th annual festival was held from April 8 to April 18, 2010.

2011

In 2011, the 5th annual festival was held from March 31 to April 10, 2011. Opening night was held at the Margot and Bill Winspear Opera House in the AT&T Performing Arts Center, a location in the Arts District of downtown Dallas. The festival was dedicated to founder and chairman emeritus Liener Temerlin.

2012

The 6th annual festival was held from April 12 through April 22, 2012. Dallas Star Award Recipients included award winning actress Laura Linney and Gabourey Sidibe and behind-the-scenes legends Glen Keane, Eric Pleskow and Bernie Pollack. A special tribute to RoboCop included star Peter Weller.

2013

In 2013, the 7th annual festival was held from April 4 through April 14, 2013, and presented more than 160 features, documentaries, shorts, and student films from 28 countries.

2014

The 8th annual festival was held from April 3 through April 13, 2014.

2015

In 2015, the 9th annual festival was held from April 9 to 19, 2015., and featured 165 films. The opening night film was I'll See You in My Dreams, starring Blythe Danner, who was present to accept the Dallas Star Award. Director John Landis (An American Werewolf in London, Coming to America, National Lampoon's Animal House, Blues Brothers) was also present to accept the Dallas Star Award. Texas writer/producer/actor L.M. Kit Carson (Paris, Texas and David Holzman's Diary) was presented with a posthumous Dallas Star Award.

2016

The 10th annual festival was held from April 14 through April 24, 2016. The opening night film was The Land, starring Erykah Badu. The Dallas Star Award was presented to cinematographer Ed Lachman and the inaugural L.M. Kit Carson Maverick Filmmaker Award was presented to Monte Hellman.

2017

In 2017, the 11th annual festival was held from March 30 through April 8, 2017. The Dallas Shining Star Award was presented to Zoey Deutch (Before I Fall). A posthumous Dallas Star Award was presented to Bill Paxton. The L.M. Kit Carson Maverick Filmmaker Award was presented to David Gordon Green.

2018

Under the direction of the new Executive Director, Johnathan Brownlee, the 12th annual festival was held from May 3 through May 10, 2018. In 2018, the festival screened more than 130 films from 22 countries, including several movies that were released nationwide later in the year: Eighth Grade, Won’t You Be My Neighbor, Dead Pigs, and Blindspotting.

2019

In 2019, the 13th Dallas International Film Festival powered by Capital One was held from April 11 through April 18, 2019. The festival screened more than 130 films from more than 35 countries, including five world premieres, one U.S. premiere, 37 Texas premieres, and 15 Dallas premieres. World premieres included: After So Many Days, El Corazón de Bolívar (Bolivar's Heart), Hurdle, The Pursuit, and This World Won't Break.

2020

The 2020 Dallas International Film Festival as an in-person event was postponed due to the COVID-19 pandemic. Dallas Film presented summer drive-in movie screening events in Dallas at Four Corners Brewing Company. Dallas Film and Ozarka also collaborated to present the first-ever Ozarka® Brand Drive-In Film Festival events, held in Dallas, Austin and Houston in fall 2020.

2021

After the 2020 festival was postponed during the COVID-19 pandemic, the 2021 Dallas International Film Festival returned under the direction of artistic director James Faust with an abbreviated in-person event from October 8 through October 10, 2021, at Alamo Drafthouse Cinema - Cedars.

2022

In 2022, the Dallas International Film Festival (DIFF) returned as a seven-day festival from October 14 through October 20. In its 16th year, DIFF presented screenings at Alamo Drafthouse Cinema - Cedars, the Morton H. Meyerson Symphony Center, Booker T. Washington High School for the Performing and Visual Arts, Texas Theatre, South Dallas Cultural Center, and 4DWN Skate Park.

2023

The 2023 edition of the Dallas International Film Festival (DIFF) was held April 28-May 5, 2023, at Violet Crown Cinema in the West Village district of Dallas. The 2023 Dallas International Film Festival was cited by Travel + Leisure magazine in naming Dallas among the "12 Best Places to Travel in April 2023". The festival was also cited by MovieMaker magazine in naming Dallas among the "Best Places to Live and Work as a MovieMaker 2023".

2024

The 2024 edition of the Dallas International Film Festival was held April 25-May 1, 2024. Opening Night featured the world premiere of ESPN ‘30 for 30’ documentary, “Dude Perfect: A Very Long Shot”, at the historic Majestic Theatre.

2025

In 2025, the Dallas International Film Festival was named an Oscar(R) Qualifying Film Festival for short films by the Academy of Motion Pictures Arts and Sciences. The festival was held April 25-May 1, 2025, at Cinepolis Victory Park. The 2026 Dallas Star Award was presented to Lou Diamond Phillips.

2026

In 2026, the Dallas International Film Festival was held April 23-30, 2026, at Cinepolis Victory Park.

== Awards ==
2007

- Target Filmmaker Award - Documentary: New Year Baby
- Target Filmmaker Award - Narrative Feature: Shut Up and Shoot Me
- Grand Jury Prize - Documentary: Iron Ladies of Liberia
- Grand Jury Prize - Texas: A Lawyer Walks into a Bar
- Grand Jury Prize - Best Short Film: Little Farm
- Student Competition: Redemption Maddie
- Special Jury Prize - Best Feature Film: Eve of Understanding
- Best HD Feature: Sharkwater
- Audience Award - Best Short: The Little Gorilla
- Audience Award - Narrative Feature: Music Within
- Audience Award - Best Feature: Darius Goes West
- Audience Award - Best Feature (In-Competition): Divine Souls

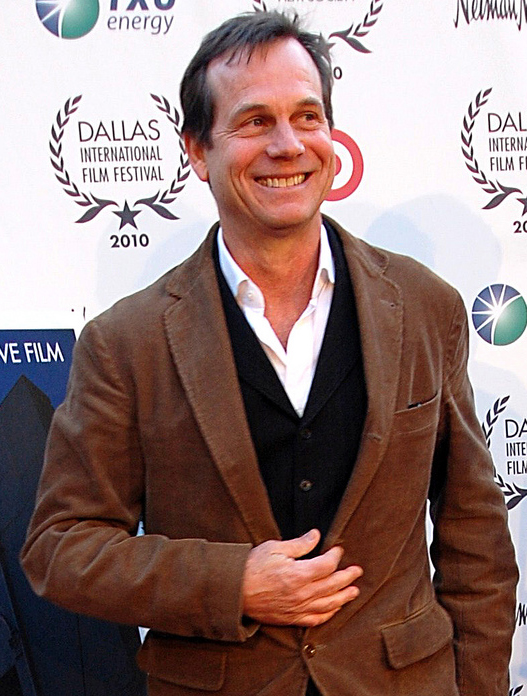
Actor Bill Paxton at the 2010 Dallas International Film Festival

2008

- Target Filmmaker Award - Honorable Mention: Bad Habits
- Grand Jury Prize - Best Short Film: The Second Line
- Special Jury Prize - Best Feature Film: Cook County
- Special Jury Prize - Special Achievement (Direction): Bongo Bong - Ken Wardrop
- Audience Award - Best Short: A Day's Work

2009

- Target Filmmaker Award - Documentary: Prom Night in Mississippi
- Target Filmmaker Award - Narrative Feature: Gigantic
- Grand Jury Prize - Best Short Film: Princess Margaret Blvd.
- Grand Jury Prize - Texas Competition: The Other Side of Paradise
- Student Competition: Hug
- Grand Jury Prize - Texas Film: St. Nick
- Special Jury Prize - Best Feature Film: Against the Current
- Current Energy Filmmaker Award: Crude
- Audience Award - Best Short: Lucy: A Period Piece
- Audience Award - Narrative Feature: Skin
- Audience Award - Documentary Feature: Rock Prophecies
- Dallas Star Award: Kathryn Bigelow

2010

- Target Filmmaker Award - Documentary: Waste Land
- Grand Jury Prize - Texas Competition (In-Competition): Hold and Carried Away
- Special Jury Prize - Special Achievement (Direction): Careful What You Wish For - Tim Vogel
- Special Jury Prize - Documentary Feature: The Last Survivor
- Audience Award - Narrative Feature: Brotherhood
- Dallas Star Award: Amber Heard

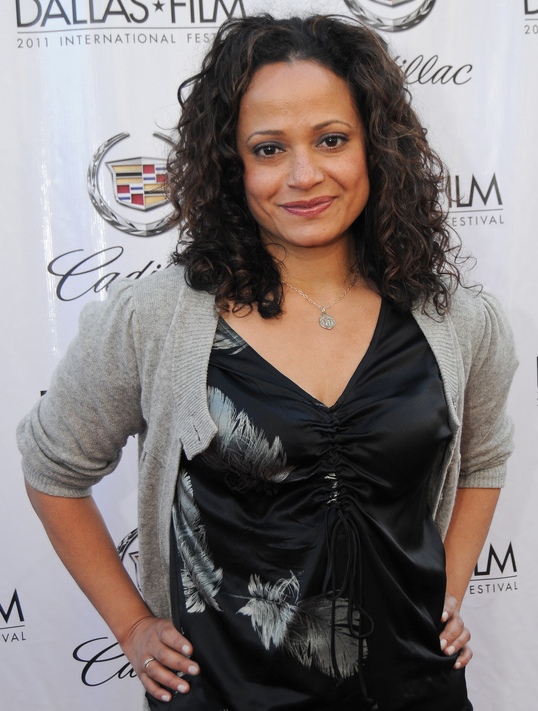
Actress Judy Reyes at the 2011 Dallas International Film Festival

2011

- Target Filmmaker Award - Narrative Feature: 5 Time Champion
- Grand Jury Prize - Best Short Film: The Legend of Beaver Dam
- Grand Jury Prize - Best Short Film (In-Competition): Crazy Beats Strong Every Time
- Student Competition: The Robbery
- Environmental Visions Grand Jury Prize: If a Tree Falls: A Story of the Earth Liberation Front
- Special Jury Prize - Special Achievement (Direction): The Birds Upstairs - Christopher Jarvis
- Special Jury Prize - Special Mention for Directing: Green Crayons - Kazik Radwanski
- Special Jury Prize - Special Achievement (Acting): Surrogate Valentine - Goh Nakamura
- Audience Award - Best Feature: Snowmen

2012

- Grand Jury Prize - Best Short Film: Nani
- Grand Jury Prize - Documentary: Tchoupitoulas
- Grand Jury Prize - Texas Competition: Wolf
- Grand Jury Prize - Narrative Feature: Faith, Love and Whiskey
- Special Jury Prize - Silver Heart Award: The Invisible War
- Silver Heart Award (In-Competition): 5 Broken Cameras
- Audience Award - Best Short: Nani
- Audience Award - Documentary Feature: First Position
- Dallas Star Award: Gabourey Sidibe
- Career Achievement in Costume Design: Bernie Pollack

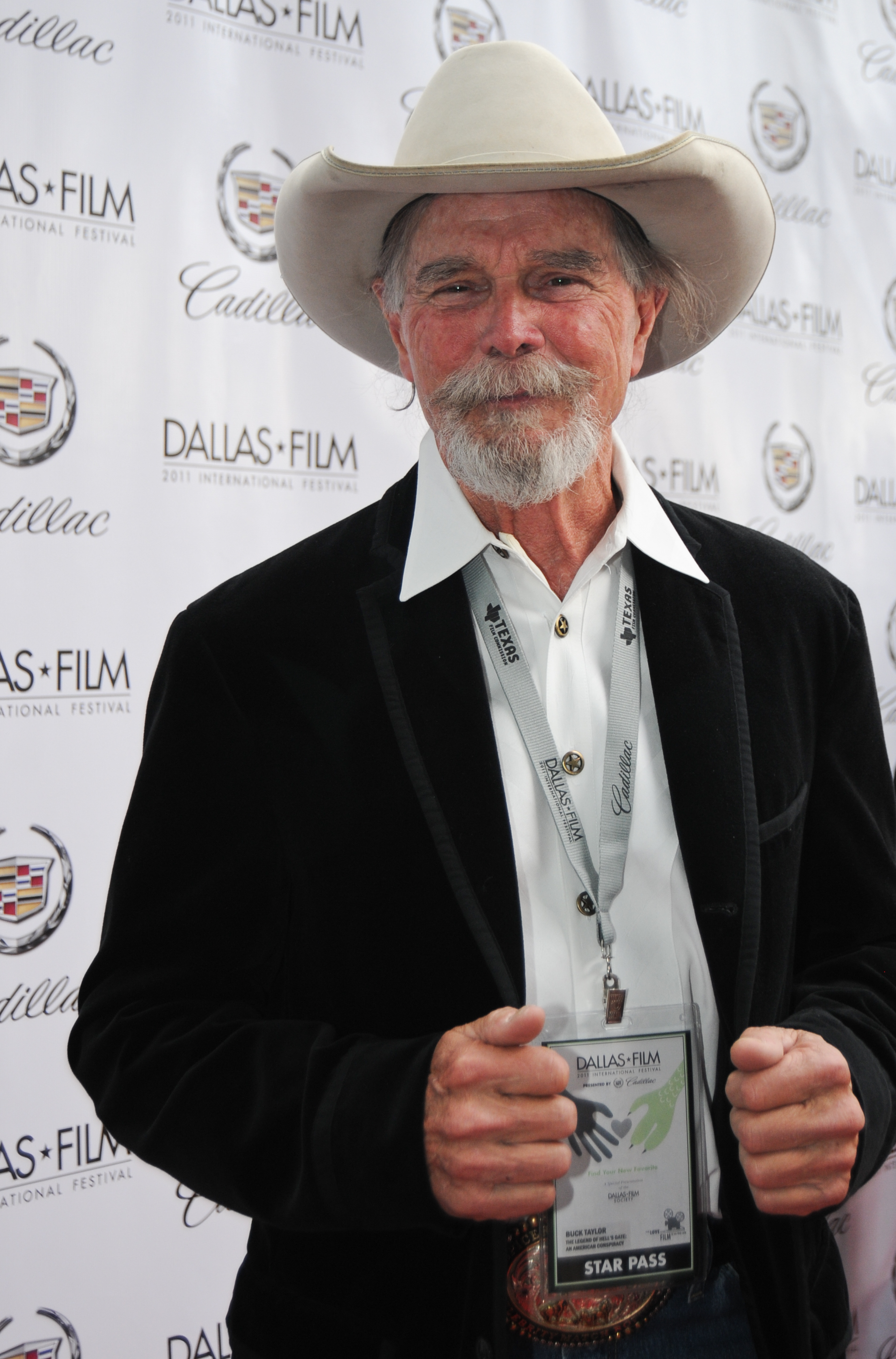
Actor Buck Taylor at the 2011 Dallas International Film Festival

2013

- Grand Jury Prize - Best Short Film (In-Competition): Gun and The Devil's Ballroom and Matriarche
- Grand Jury Prize - Texas Competition: Pit Stop
- Student Competition: The First Hope
- Grand Jury Prize - Narrative Feature (In-Competition): He's Way More Famous Than You
- Special Jury Prize - Silver Heart Award (In Competition): Small Small Thing
- Best HD Feature (In-Competition): Azooma
- Audience Award - Documentary Feature: The Crash Reel
- Audience Award - Narrative Feature: The Kings of Summer
- Best Feature Documentary Award: Small Small Thing

2014

- Animated Short Grand Jury Prize: The Missing Scarf
- Grand Jury Prize - Best Short Film (In-Competition): The Bravest, the Boldest and Easy
- Grand Jury Prize - Documentary: The Special Need
- Grand Jury Prize - Texas Competition: Flutter
- Grand Jury Prize - Narrative Feature: Hellion
- Special Jury Prize - Short Film: Easy
- Special Jury Prize - Shorts Competition: Ni-Ni
- Audience Award - Documentary Feature: Queens & Cowboys: A Straight Year on the Gay Rodeo
- Audience Award - Narrative Feature: Noble

2015

- Grand Jury Award - Animated Short Film: World of Tomorrow
- Grand Jury Award - Short Film: The Chicken
- Grand Jury Award - Documentary Feature: Barge
- Grand Jury Award - Texas Competition: Sacrifice
- Grand Jury Award - Narrative Feature: Radiator
- Grand Jury Award - Student Short Film: Cast in India
- Special Jury Prize - Narrative Feature, Ensemble Acting: Echoes of War
- Special Jury Prize - Narrative Feature, Cinematography: Some Beasts
- Special Jury Prize - Short Film: The Face of Ukraine: Casting Oksana Baiul
- Special Jury Prize - Texas Competition, Ensemble Performance: The Love Inside
- Audience Award - Documentary Feature: Batkid Begins: The Wish Heard Around the World
- Audience Award - Narrative Feature: Thunder Broke the Heavens
- Audience Award - Short Film: Melville
- Silver Heart Award - Frame By Frame

2016

- Grand Jury Award - Animated Short Film: Snowfall
- Grand Jury Award - Short Film: The Black Belt
- Grand Jury Award - Documentary Feature: The Pearl
- Grand Jury Award - Texas Competition: Tower
- Grand Jury Award - Narrative Feature: Mr. Pig
- Grand Jury Award - Student Short Film: Fata Morgana
- Special Jury Prize - Narrative Feature, Performance: Arianna
- Special Jury Prize - Documentary Feature: In Pursuit of Silence
- Special Jury Prize - Short Film: Minor Setback
- Special Jury Prize - Texas Competition: Booger Red
- Special Jury Prize - Student Short Film: The Mink Catcher
- Audience Award - Documentary Feature: Until Proven Innocent
- Audience Award - Narrative Feature: Transpecos
- Audience Award - Short Film: So Good to See You
- Silver Heart Award - Hooligan Sparrow
- Dallas County Historical Commission (DCHC) Historical Film: Footprint

2017

- Grand Jury Award - Animated Short Film: Mr. Madila
- Grand Jury Award - Short Film: What Happened to Her
- Grand Jury Award - Documentary Feature: Quest
- Grand Jury Award - Texas Competition: Mr. Roosevelt
- Grand Jury Award - Narrative Feature: The Relationtrip
- Special Jury Prize - Narrative Feature, Directing: Heartstone
- Special Jury Prize - Documentary Feature, Artistry: Spettacolo
- Special Jury Prize - Short Film: Hairat
- Special Jury Prize - Short Film, Performance: Arin MacLaine, Spring
- Audience Award - Documentary Feature: Dealt
- Audience Award - Narrative Feature: Bomb City
- Audience Award - Short Film: No Other Way to Say It
- Silver Heart Award - City of Ghosts

2018

- Grand Jury Award - Animated Short Film: Agua Viva
- Grand Jury Award - Narrative Short Film: Krista
- Grand Jury Award - Documentary Feature: The Blessing
- Grand Jury Award - Documentary Short Film: Adversary
- Grand Jury Award - Texas Competition: 1985
- Grand Jury Award - Narrative Feature: Dead Pigs
- Special Jury Prize - Narrative Feature: Madeline's Madeline
- Special Jury Prize - Documentary Short: An Uncertain Future
- Special Jury Prize - Midnight Short: Mobius
- Special Jury Prize - Texas Competition: The Iron Orchard
- Special Jury Prize - Short Film, Comedy: Allen Anders: Live at the Comedy Castle Circa 1987
- Audience Award - Documentary Feature: Loud Krazy Love
- Audience Award - Documentary Short: Tomnoddy
- Audience Award - Narrative Feature: Tejano
- Audience Award - Narrative Short: Caroline

2019

- Grand Jury Award - Animated Short Film: Reneepoptosis
- Grand Jury Award - Narrative Short Film: Rapaz
- Grand Jury Award - Documentary Feature: Always in Season
- Grand Jury Award - Documentary Short Film: Mack Wrestles
- Grand Jury Award - Texas Competition: J.R. "Bob" Dobbs and the Church of the SubGenius
- Grand Jury Award - Narrative Feature: Ms. Purple
- Special Jury Prize - Narrative Short: Okaasan
- Special Jury Prize - Documentary Feature: Caballerango
- Special Jury Prize - Documentary Short: Gli anni
- Special Jury Prize - Narrative Feature, Screenplay: Sister Aimee
- Special Jury Prize - Texas Competition: Shoot the Moon Right Between the Eyes
- Audience Award - Documentary Feature: Alice Cooper: Live from the Astroturf
- Audience Award - Documentary Short: The Queen's New Clothes
- Audience Award - Narrative Feature: This World Won't Break
- Dallas County Historical Commission (DCHC) Historical Film: Seadrift

2022

- Grand Jury Prize - Best Narrative Feature: Acidman
- Grand Jury Prize - Best Documentary Feature: Last Flight Home
- Grand Jury Prize - Best Texas Feature: A Run for More
- Grand Jury Prize - Best Short Film: My Summer Vacation
- Grand Jury Prize - Best Texas Short Film: Hundreds of Thousands
- Audience Award - Best Documentary Feature: Song For Hope
- Audience Award - Best Narrative Feature: Roll With It
- Audience Award - Best Short Film: My Summer Vacation

2023

- Grand Jury Prize - Best Texas Feature: Into the Spotlight
- Special Jury Prize for Diversity in Casting and Excellent Cinematography: Match Me If You Can
- Grand Jury Prize - Best Documentary Feature: Bad Press
- Special Jury Prize for Storytelling: The Eternal Memory
- Grand Jury Prize - Best Narrative Feature: Story Ave
- Special Jury Prize for Outstanding Performance: Rosy McEwen, Blue Jean
- Dallas County Historical Commission Prize for Best Historical Film: Breaking the Code
- Grand Jury Prize - Best Texas Short Film: Green Water
- Grand Jury Prize - Best Documentary Short Film: Really Good Friends
- Grand Jury Prize - Best Short: I Have No Tears, And I Must Cry
- Grand Jury Prize - Best Animated Short Film: Today, I Will Be the Bread
- Grand Jury Prize - Best Student Film within the Shorts Competition: Picture Day
- Special Jury Prize for Short Film: Our Males and Females
- Audience Award - Best Narrative Feature: Chocolate Lizards
- Audience Award - Best Documentary Feature: Into The Spotlight
- Audience Award - Best International Feature: Simón
- Audience Award - Best Short Film: Our Males and Females
- Best High School Short Film (Lake Highlands High School): Elevator

2024

- Grand Jury Prize - Best Texas Feature – WATER WARS
- Special Jury Prize for Perseverance and Bravery – AN ARMY OF WOMEN
- Grand Jury Prize - Best Documentary Feature – PRINT IT BLACK
- Jury Honorable Mention for Cinematography – PORCELAIN WAR
- Grand Jury Prize - Best Narrative Feature – STAKES IS HIGH
- Dallas County Historical Commission Prize for Best Historical Film – MAKING OF A CLASSIC
- Grand Jury Prize - Best Texas Short Film – HONEY & MILK
- Grand Jury Prize - Best International Short Film – SOUND & COLOUR
- Grand Jury Prize - Best Documentary Short Film – A BODY CALLED LIFE
- Grand Jury Prize - Best Animated Short Film – PERFECT CITY: THE BRAVEST KID
- Grand Jury Prize - Best Student Film within the Shorts Competition – CRUST
- ShotDeck Presents the Grand Jury Prize for Best Short Film – PLAY DATE
- Special Jury Mention Short Film – SMOKE
- Special Jury Mention Short Film – JACKPOT
- Audience Award - Best Narrative Feature – RIDE
- Audience Award - Best Documentary Feature – BASTARDS OF SOUL
- Audience Award - Best International Feature – PORCELAIN WAR
- Audience Award - Best Short – PLAY DATE
- Audience Award - North Texas High School Showcase – LIFT (Prosper High School)

2025

Grand Jury Prizes

- Best Texas Feature – A PORTRAIT OF A POSTMAN
- Narrative Feature – OMAHA
- Special Jury Mention for Directing – 40 ACRES
- Documentary Feature – THE LIBRARIANS
- Special Jury Mention for Cinematography – REMAINING NATIVE
- Best Historical Award Feature Presented by Dallas County Historical Commission – A PORTRAIT OF A POSTMAN
- Best Historical Award Short Film Presented by Dallas County Historical Commission – ODESSA, TX
- Documentary Short – RED SANDS
- Special Jury Mention for Director – LONDON, KY.
- Animated Short – MOTHER’S CHILD
- Narrative Short Presented by ShotDeck – TENEZ
- Special Jury Mention for Screenplay – WHAT FREEDOM
- International Short – DON’T LEAVE HOME
- Student Short – FAMILY SUNDAY
- Texas Short – ADO
- Special Jury Mention for Directing and Cinematography – SWIMMING WITH BUTTERFLIES

Audience Awards

- Documentary Feature – A PORTRAIT OF A POSTMAN
- Narrative Feature – 40 ACRES
- International Feature – HAPPY AS LARRY
- Short Film – GEORGE
- Music Video – Kai Straw, CHOKIN’
- North Texas High School Showcase – FOREST FEUD

Screenwriting Competition

- Texas Winner – HOW TO START A CULT
- Pilot Winner – LATE BLOOMERS
- Shorts Winner – THE BEST DAYS OF RICHARD DAVIS
- Feature – UNBOUND

2026

Grand Jury Prizes

- Narrative Feature – IF I GO WILL THEY MISS ME
- Documentary Feature – ONE IN A MILLION
- Texas Feature – AMERICAN BABY
- International Short – LIFE GOES ON
- Texas Short – JUST MY LUCK
- Documentary Short – THE BADDEST SPEECHWRITER OF ALL
- Animated Short – THAT NIGHT
- Narrative Short Presented by ShotDeck – MEETING YOUR MAKER
- Student Short – IN THE STILL OF NIGHT
- Special Jury Mention for Narrative Feature – PINCH
- Special Jury Mention for Documentary Feature – POWWOW PEOPLE
- Special Jury Mention for Texas Feature – VALENTINA
- Special Jury Mention for International Short – FELLOW
- Special Jury Mention for Student Short – SHIFT
- Best Historical Award Feature Presented by Dallas County Historical Commission – REVOLUTION'S DAUGHTER
- Best Historical Award Short Film Presented by Dallas County Historical Commission – THE BADDEST SPEECHWRITER OF ALL

Audience Awards

- Narrative Feature – ONE IN A MILLION
- Documentary Feature – OCCUPATIONAL HAZARD: THE FIRST CORAL REEFERS
- International Feature – PINCH
- Short Film – FLESH & BLOOD
- Music Video – Tago and Ori Evans, 99 PROBLEMS
- North Texas High School Showcase – VALUE

Screenwriting Competition

- Feature – WHY NOT HER?
- Texas Winner – STRANGE, BUT PERFECT
- Pilot Winner – SEX IS WORK
- Shorts Winner – MISSED CONNECTIONS
