= Abdulrahman Thaher =

Palestinian Director and Actor

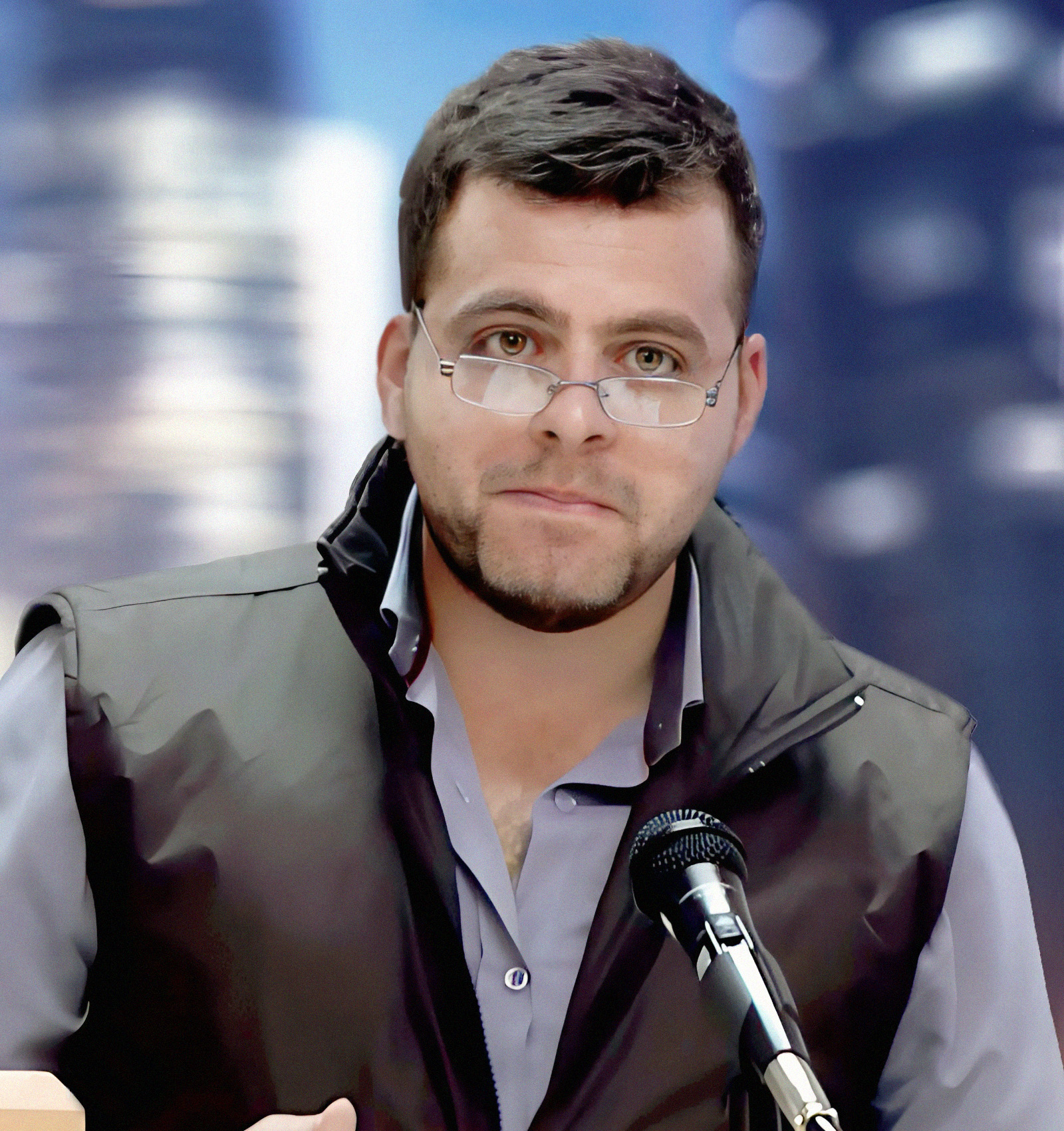
- Abdulrahman Thaher in 2014
- Born: Abdulrahman Asad Thaher; 31 December 1982 (age 43); United Arab Emirates
- Citizenship: State of Palestine; Jordan
- Education: Bachelor's degree, An-Najah National University
- Occupations: Satirical writer Actor; Director; Journalist; Architect.
- Years active: 2004–present
- Organization: International Federation of Journalists
- Television: Fenjan Albalad; Sukaj; In the Presence of Justice
- Spouse: Rasha Thaher (married 2010–present)
- Family: Zahir al-Umar
- Awards: The 11th Alexandria Festival for Arab Youth Award.
- Website: thahers.com/en

Abdulrahman Asad Thaher, (Arabic: عبد الرحمن ظاهر, romanized: ʿAbd al-Raḥmān Ẓāhir; born 31 December 1982) is a Palestinian-Jordanian actor, director, satirical screenwriter, journalist and human rights defender.

== Life and career ==
Abdulrahman Thaher was born in 1982 in the United Arab Emirates to a Palestinian family originally from Nablus, located in the northern West Bank of Palestine.

He graduated from the Faculty of Architecture in 2007 at An-Najah National University and completed his studies in directing and acting. He has also written, directed, and performed in Fenjan Albalad, Sukaj, and In the Presence of Justice, which are known for their black comedy style.

Thaher has been the Production Department Manager at Wattan TV, Director of International Production at the Media Center of An-Najah National University, and Senior Producer at Smalink Media Production Company in Beirut. Thaher has produced television programs for Jordan's Roya TV and Al Araby Television Network in London.

He has faced prosecution and arrests.

== Arrests and trials ==
=== Arrests by the Palestinian Authority ===
Numerous Palestinian activists, human rights defenders, and journalists held protests against the Palestinian Authority's arrest of Thaher in August and September 2020. They demonstrated against the poor conditions of his detention and his declining health, gathering outside the court in Nablus and the Palestinian Prime Minister's office in Ramallah. Thaher's arrest sparked widespread discussion on social media and in Palestinian, Arab, and international media. The United Nations High Commissioner for Human Rights and various international human rights groups monitored the situation. At that time, the Palestinian Authority faced accusations of infringing on freedom of expression and fabricating charges against political activists and journalists. This pressure led to Thaher's conditional release in September 2020, but his trial continued under the Cybercrime Law.

In January 2022, a Nablus court sentenced Thaher to three months in prison for defaming the Palestinian Authority. The ruling sparked strong reactions from journalists and activists, leading to the intervention of international human rights organizations. They urged the Palestinian Authority to protect Thaher and other journalists, and called for an end to violations against the political opposition. As a result, the sentence was suspended while Thaher's legal team appealed the decision. Ultimately, the Court of Appeal ruled in Thaher's favor, acquitting him of all charges after two years of trials.

=== Arrest in Israel ===
In October 2020, just a few weeks after Thaher was released from Palestinian Authority prisons, the IDF arrested him at his home in Nablus. They questioned him about his television work outside of Palestine. A month later, an Israeli court ruled to release him.

== Filmography ==
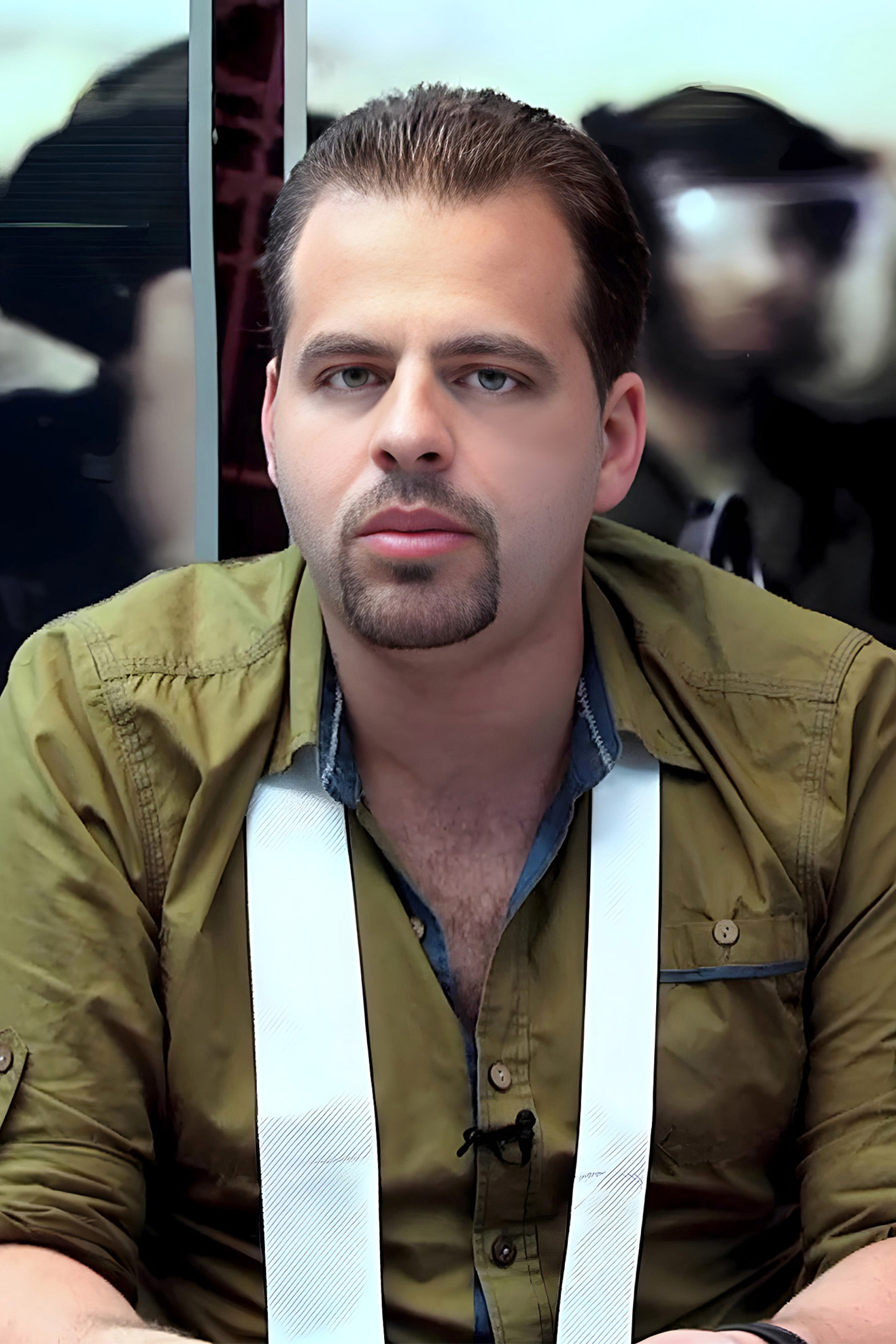
Director and actor Abdulrahman Thaher )2014)

Thaher has produced and directed TV series and programs characterized by black comedy. Below is a list of Abdulrahman Thaher's most known works:

=== Television ===
==== Series ====
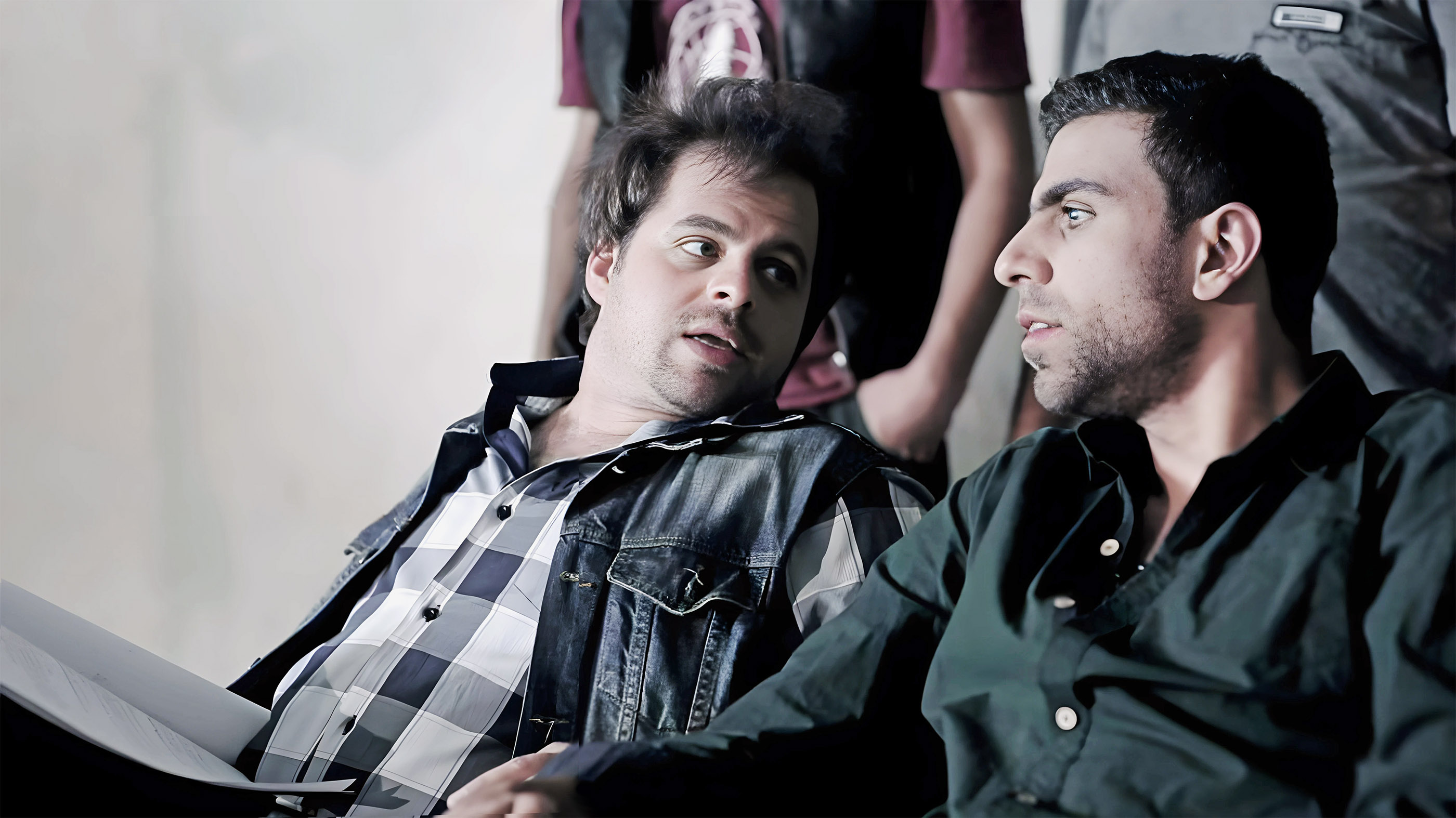
Abdulrahman Thaher during the filming of the TV series "Sukaj" in Jordan (2015)

Year	Title	Genre	Country of production	Role	Channel	Ref.
2013	Fenjan Albalad (S1)	drama, black comedy, and satire	Palestine	Director, screenwriter and actor	Roya TV channel	
2013	In the Presence of Justice	drama, crime, and vagueness	Palestine	Director and writer	Wattan TV	
2014	Fenjan Albalad (S2)	drama, black comedy, and satire	Jordan	Director, writer and Leading actor	Roya TV channel	
2015	Fenjan Albalad (S3)	drama, black comedy, and satire	Jordan	Director, writer and Leading actor	Al Araby TV channel	
2015	Sukaj (S1)	black comedy	Jordan	Director, writer and main actor	Al Araby TV channel	
2016	Sukaj (S2)	black comedy	Jordan	Director, writer and Leading actor	Al Araby TV channel	
2020	What's up	comedy	Palestine	Writer and Leading actor	NBC TV	

==== Animated series ====
Year	Title	Genre	Country	Role	Ref.
2017	Abu Saleh (S1)	farce drama and black comedy	Jordan	Writer, director and Leading actor	
2019	Abu Saleh (S2)	farce drama and black comedy	Lebanon	Writer, director and Leading actor	

==== Programs ====
Year	Title	Genre	Country of production	Role	Channel	Ref.
2012	The other opinion	talk show and politics	Palestine	Producer and director	Wattan TV	
2013	Upside down	entertainment and vox pop	Palestine	Director	Roya TV	
2014	Zinko	talk show, politics, and news satire	Palestine Jordan	Producer, director and presenter	Roya TV	
2015	Ghabash (S1)	entertainment, vox pop, and challenges	Jordan	Producer, director and presenter	Al Araby	
2015	Archive	curriculum vitae	Jordan	Producer, director and presenter	Al Araby	
2016	Ghabash (S2)	entertainment, vox pop, and challenges	Jordan	Producer, director and presenter	Roya TV	
2016	Mute	social and political commentary	Palestine	Executive Producer	Roya TV	
2017	Hilal Mawwal	entertainment and talk show	Lebanon	Senior producer	Al Quds	
2018	Yours or the wolf's?	reality show and riddles	Lebanon	Producer, director and presenter	Al Quds	
2019	Ghabash (S3)	entertainment, vox pop, and challenges	Palestine	Producer, director and presenter	Roya TV	
2020	Accordingly	recursive self-improvement	Palestine	Writer and presenter	NBC TV	
2020	Trick (S1)	reality show, riddles, and prizes	Palestine	Producer, director and presenter	Roya TV	
2021	Trick (S2)	reality show, riddles, and prizes	Palestine	Producer, director and presenter	Roya TV	

=== Film ===
Year	Title	Genre	Role	Ref.
2005	Paradise Now	psychological drama	Actor	
2016	Mute	farce drama	Producer	

=== Plays ===
Year	Title	Genre	Countries of shows	Role	Director	Ref.
2005	Memory Page	realism	Palestine	ًPlaywright and leading actor	Gufran Odah	
2007	Flash Back	black comedy	Palestine Jordan	ًPlaywright and leading actor	Said Sada	
2008	There on the Other Shore	psychological drama	Palestine Egypt	Leading actor	Fathi Abdul Rahman	

=== Radio ===
Year	Title	Genre	Country	Role	Ref.
2013	In court	drama, crime, and vagueness	Palestine	Writer, director, and leading actor	

== Awards ==
- 11th Alexandria Festival for Arab Youth Award in 2008, "There on the Other Shore".
- 19th Arab Radio and Television Festival Award in Tunisia in 2018, "Mosh Banamaj".
