= Fenjan Albalad =

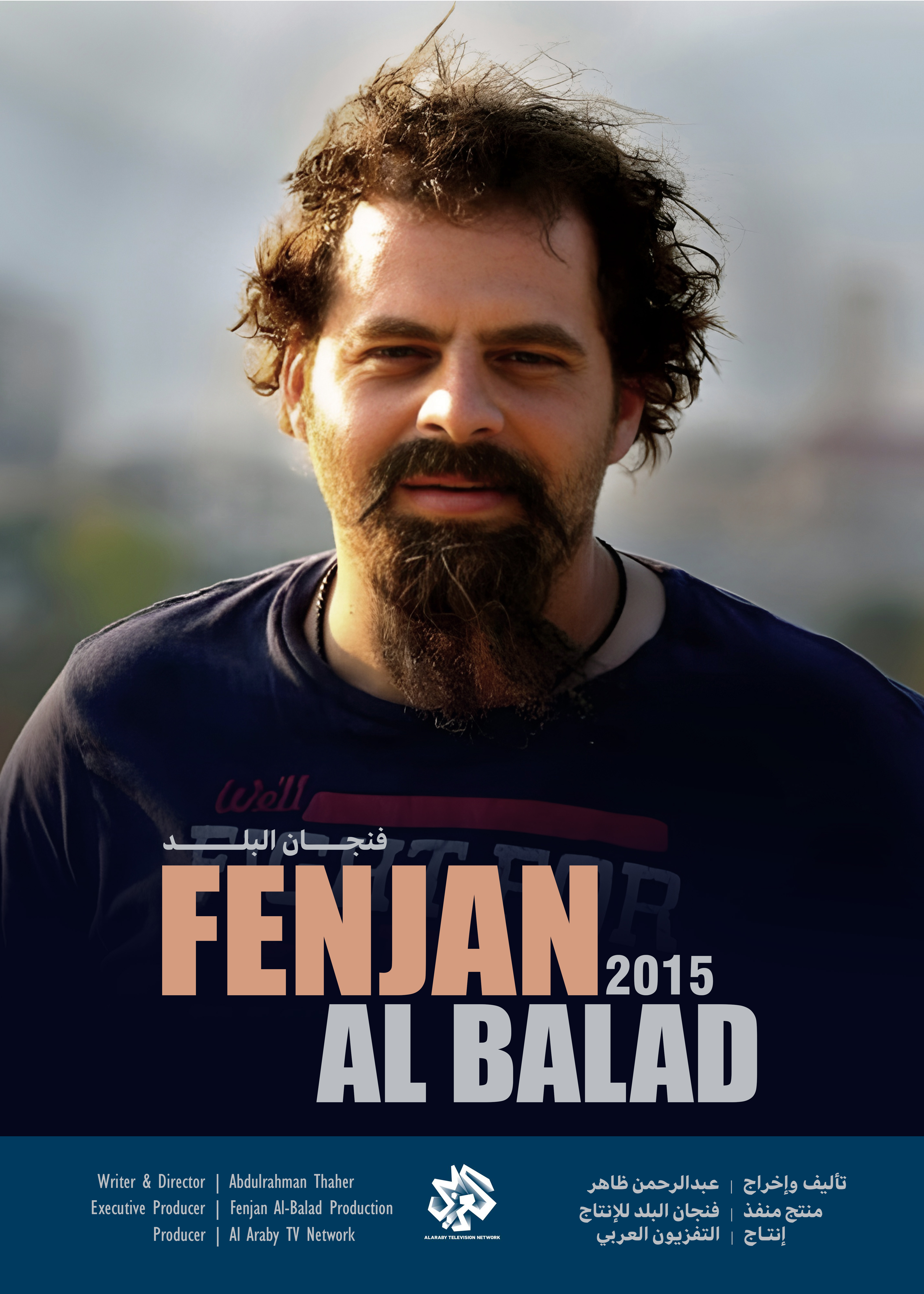
- Poster of Fenjan Albalad (season 3) 2015
- Genre: Drama | Black comedy | Satire
- Written by: Abdulrahman Thaher
- Directed by: Abdulrahman Thaher
- Country of origin: Palestine
- Original language: Arabic
- No. of seasons: 3
- No. of episodes: 60

Production
- Executive producer: Fenjan Albalad Production
- Production locations: Palestine; Jordan

Original release
- Network: Al Araby Television Network; Roya TV
- Release: 2013 – 2015

Fenjan Albalad (Arabic: فنجان البلد) is a satirical television series from Palestine, created and directed by Abdulrahman Thaher. It premiered in 2013 and features 3 seasons with a total of 60 standalone episodes, filmed in both Palestine and Jordan. A number of Palestinian and Arab actors featured in this series., and Some segments of the show are archived at the National Library of Jordan.

The first season was filmed in 2013 across various cities and villages in the West Bank, Palestine, and aired on Jordanian Roya TV. This season generated significant controversy due to its daring approach and sharp critique of the Palestinian Authority and corruption. No Palestinian TV was willing to air the series because of its sensitive content, leading to legal challenges for the director and writer Abdulrahman Thaher over certain provocative episodes, including The episode of "Al-Tabbash", in which the writer criticized the character of a minister. Some journalists at that time believed that the writer intended to indirectly refer to the Palestinian Minister of Endowments, Mahmoud Habbash, and the episode of "Valley of the Wolves", which dealt with the subject of the differences between the Palestinian parties, these episodes were covered in the media and news. This situation prompted the production team to relocate to Jordan to produce the next seasons.

The second season was filmed in 2014 in Jordan and also aired on Roya TV, which subsequently faced backlash from the Palestinian Authority, resulting in the closure of its West Bank office in protest against the critical content. Due to these pressures, Roya TV was unable to produce the third season.

in 2015, Director Abdulrahman Thaher partnered with Al-Araby Television Network in London to create and air the third season. One episode, titled “Qadh Al-Raees,” featured Thaher in a leading role and led to his arrest and trial upon his return to Palestine in 2020 for allegedly insulting the Palestinian Authority. His public trial attracted considerable media coverage and led to calls for his release from activists, journalists, and human rights defenders, ultimately resulting in his acquittal after a two-year legal battle.

== Fenjan Albalad Seasons ==
Season	Episodes	Country	Crew	Cast	Production Companies	Network	Ref.
Season 2013	30	Palestine	Director / Abdulrahman Thaher; Screenwriter / Abdulrahman Thaher; DOP / Sameh Karim; Production Manager / Mahmud Rizik	Abdulrahman Thaher; Mahmud Rizik; Abdullah Nukhaili; Musa Allawi; Reem Sharha; Lama Rabah; Saleh Hamad	Executive Producer / Fenjan Albalad Production; Production services / Wattan TV	Roya TV	
Season 2014	15	Jordan	Director / Abdulrahman Thaher; Screenwriter / Abdulrahman Thaher; DOP / Jamal Al-Tamimi; Production Manager / Anwar Kaleel	Abdulrahman Thaher; Mahmud Rizik; Munther Khalil; Khalil Mustafa; Anwar Khaleel; Yasmin Dalw; Yehya Ibrahim; Osama Kanaan; Seem Mahasnah; Fahed Hiwwadi	Executive Producer / Fenjan Albalad Production; Production services / Apple Jo; Production services / Dreamer Production	Roya TV	
Season 2015	15	Jordan	Director / Abdulrahman Thaher; Screenwriter / Abdulrahman Thaher; DOP / Jamal Al-Tamimi; Production Manager / Mahmud Rizik	Abdulrahman Thaher; Ola Yaseen; Mahmud Rizik; Abdullah Nukhaili; Fahed Hiwwadi; Yasmin Dalw; Yehya Ibrahim; Osama Kanaan	Executive Producer / Fenjan Albalad Production; Production services / Apple Jo	Al Araby Television Network	
