= Our Males and Females =

2023 short film by Ahmad Alyaseer

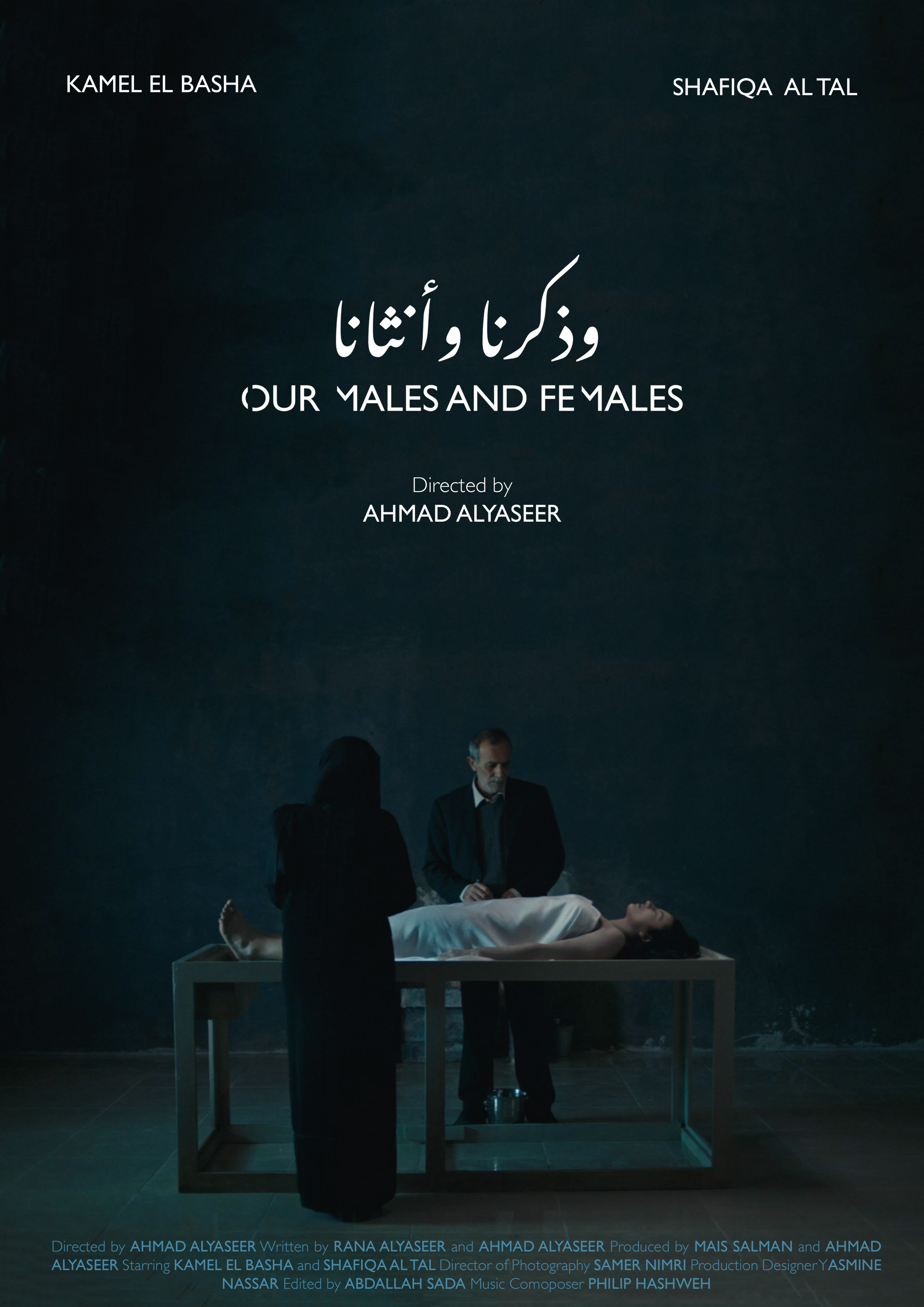
- Film Poster
- Directed by: Ahmad Alyaseer
- Written by: Rana Alyaseer; Ahmad Alyaseer
- Produced by: Mais Salman; Ahmad Alyaseer
- Starring: Kamel El Basha; Shafiqa Al Tal
- Cinematography: Samer Nimri
- Edited by: Abdallah Sada
- Music by: Philip Hashweh
- Release date: 19 January 2023 (USA)
- Running time: 11 minutes
- Country: Jordan
- Language: Arabic

Our Males and Females is a short film from Jordan directed by Ahmad Alyaseer. It was written by Rana Alyaseer and Ahmad Alyaseer and produced by Mais Salman and Ahmad Alyaseer. The film explores themes of gender identity, societal expectations, and the complexity of human relationships.

The film has won notable awards including Best Narrative Short film at the 54th Nashville Film Festival making it eligible for the Academy Award for Best Live Action Short Film.

== Plot ==
A set of parents are faced with the painful task of washing and shrouding their deceased transgender daughter. Shrouding is an Islamic religious practice that is deemed obligatory to carry out upon death. But when no one agrees to wash her and shame falls onto the family, how far is the father willing to go to make sure his "son" is washed?

== Cast ==
- Kamel El Basha as The Father
- Shafiqa Al Tal as The Mother
- Mutaz Al Labadi as The Male Washer
- Sna' Saleh as The Female Washer
- Tetiana Beras as The Daughter

== Release ==
Our Males and Females had its world premiere on January 19, 2023, at Slamdance Film Festival. A week after, it had its European premiere at Clermont-Ferrand International Short Film Festival where it was part of the international competition. Following that, the film had a strong festival run and it was selected for 17 Oscar Qualifying Film Festivals.

== Reception ==
Our Males and Females has garnered widespread acclaim from film critics. It has been reviewed and rated by Brian Penn of UK Film Review, Bobby Lepire from Film Threat, Matt Fagerholm of RogerEbert and Steve Kopian of Unseen Films.

Despite its short duration, the film has attracted comments by several media and other film reviewers. The Film Verdict media stated that the film is a work of resounding emotion that extends beyond its microcosmic scenario.

== Production ==
The film was self-funded in Jordan by the director. The film was banned by censorship from many Arab countries.

== Awards ==
The film has officially been selected for 160 film festivals in around 47 countries and has received 124 awards, including:

Year	Ceremony	Award/Category	Status
2023	Nashville Film Festival	Best Narrative Short	Won
2023	Odense International Film Festival	H. C. Andersen Award for Best Short Film	Nominated
2023	Palm Springs International ShortFest	Best Live Action Under 15 Minutes	Nominated
2023	Palm Springs International ShortFest	Best LGBTQ+ Short	Nominated
2023	Clermont-Ferrand International Short Film Festival	Grand Prix	Nominated
2023	Oldenburg Film Festival	Jury Special Mention	Won
2023	Dallas International Film Festival	Audience Award for Best Short Film	Won
2023	Dallas International Film Festival	Jury Special Prize	Won
2023	Iris Prize	Iris Prize	Nominated
2023	Short Shorts Film Festival & Asia	George Lucas Award	Nominated
2023	La Guarimba International Film Festival	Best Fiction Short Film	Won
2023	Athens International Film and Video Festival	Best Narrative Short	Nominated
2023	Boston Short Film Festival	Best Narrative Short Film	Won
2023	Boston Short Film Festival	Best LGBTQ+	Won
2023	Cleveland International Film Festival	Best Live Action Short Film	Nominated
2023	Florida Film Festival	Best Narrative Short	Nominated
2023	Slamdance Film Festival	Best Narrative Short	Nominated
2023	International Short Film Festival Psarokokalo	Best Film with Emphasis on Diversity	Won
2023	Tirana International Film Festival	Best Fiction Short Film	Nominated
2023	FEST New Directors/New Films Festival	Silver Lynx	Nominated
2023	Maremetraggio International ShorTS Film Festival	Audience Award	Won
2023	Indy Shorts International Film Festival	Narrative Short	Nominated
2023	Oslo/Fusion International Film Festival	Best Short Film	Won
2023	Regard: Saguenay International Short Film Festival	Parallel Competition	Nominated
2023	Regard: Saguenay International Short Film Festival	Short & Queer Award	Nominated
2023	BRUKIVKA International Film Festival	Jury Prize	Won
2023	BRUKIVKA International Film Festival	Union of the Ukrainian Film Critics Prize	Won
2023	Cordillera International Film Festival	Best of Festival - Short Film	Nominated
2023	Cordillera International Film Festival	Best Director Short Film	Nominated
2023	Cordillera International Film Festival	Best International Short Film	Nominated
2023	Cordillera International Film Festival	Best LGBTQIA+ Award	Won
