= Olympe de G. =

French film director

Olympe De G.
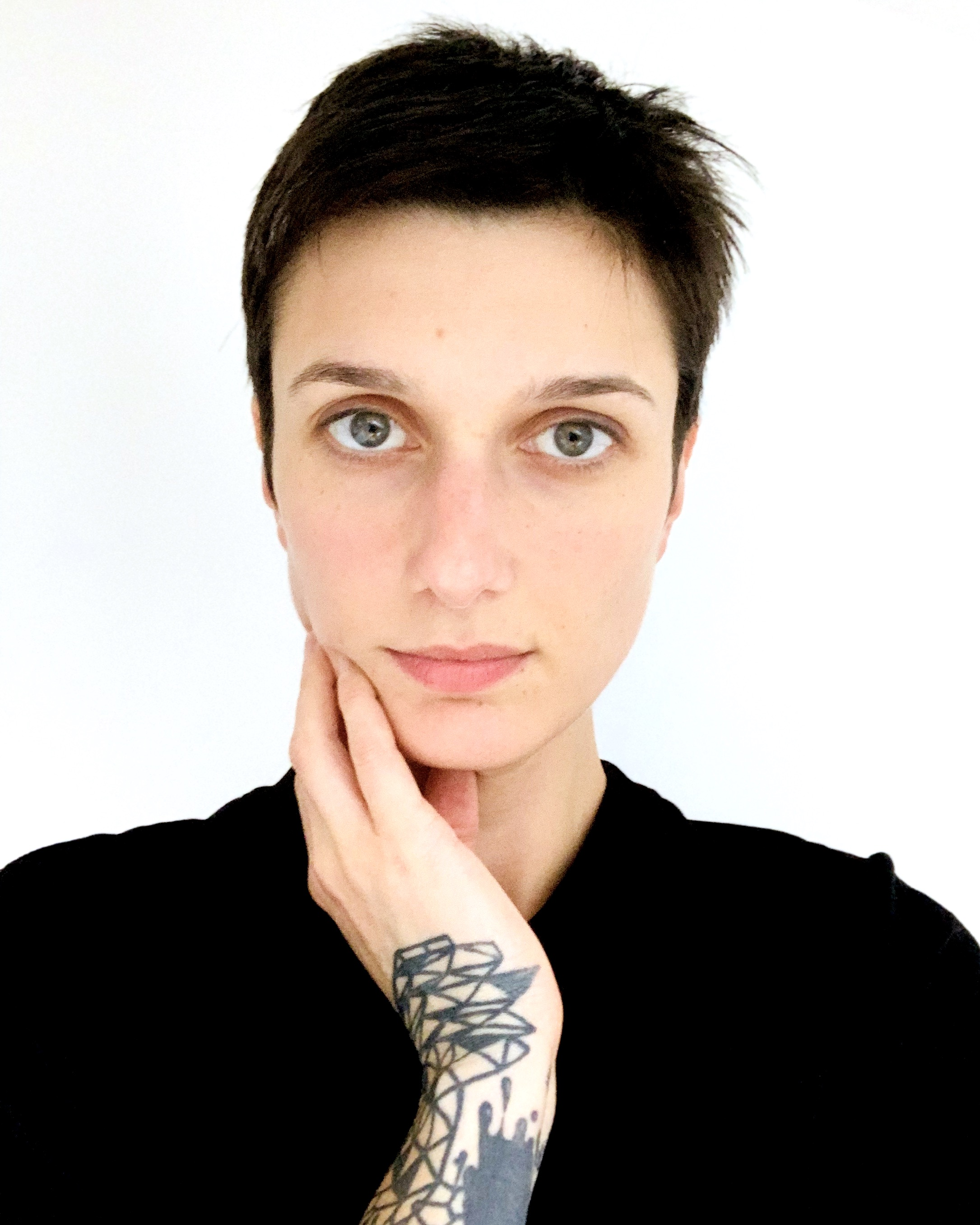
- Occupations: Director; producer; actress
- Years active: 2016 – present
- Style: Feminist porn

Olympe de G. is a French feminist pornographic film director. She has directed adult short films for Erika Lust's production. She has also created erotic podcasts, such as Voxxx. Her name is a pseudonym.

== Early life ==
She hails from Paris, France. Olympe de G. is her pseudonym adapted from activist Olympe de Gouges.

== Career ==
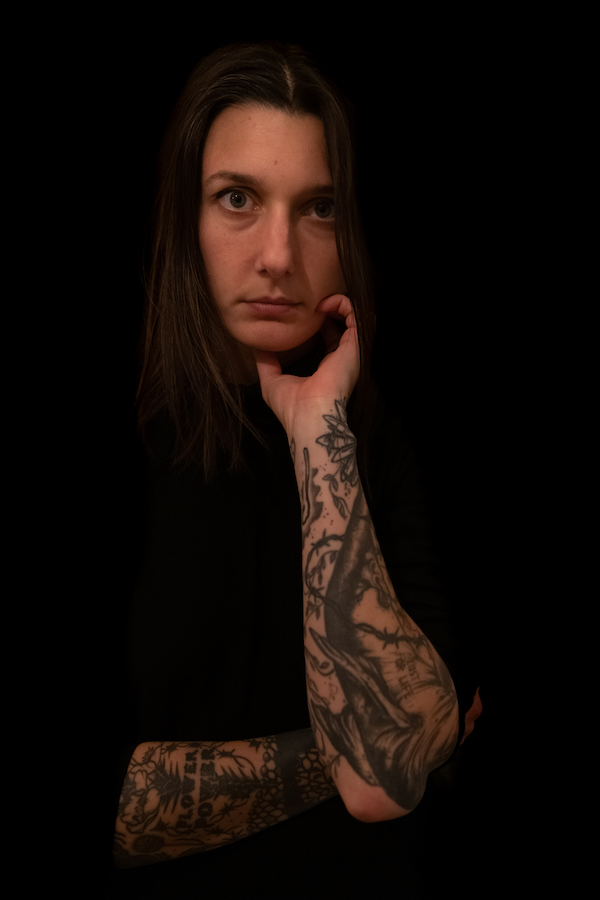
Olympe de G. in 2022

In France, de G. has directed commercials and music videos, including for the band Christine and The Queens. According to de G, she began creating feminist pornography to encourage women to embrace their desires without judgment. In 2016, she made her directorial debut with The Bitchhiker, a short porn film starring herself and funded by Erika Lust. It depicted her long-held fantasy about picking up a hitchhiker on her motorbike, driving him to an empty workshop, and pegging him with black leather strap-on dildo. De G. continued directing adult short film for Lust until 2017.

She made her feature film directorial debut in 2020 with Une Dernière Fois (One Last Time), which was screened at the Marché du Film. It was produced by Kidam, Topshot Films and Olympe de G. Production, in coproduction with Canal+. The film follows a 69-year-old woman who, in a society that neglects the elderly, spends her last year planning her final meal, walk, and sexual experience. In 2017, she ventured into erotic podcasts, debuting with L'Appli rose for Audible. Her podcasts include Voxxx and Coxxx.

== Filmography ==
=== Direction ===
- The Bitchhiker (short film, 2016, created by Erika Lust)
- Don't Call Me a Dick (short film, 2017, created by Erika Lust)
- Take Me Through the Looking Glass (short film, 2017, created by Erika Lust)
- We Are the Fucking World (short film, 2017, created by Erika Lust)
- One Last Time (long film, 2020, co-produced by Kidam, Olympe de G. Production, Topshot Films et Canal+)

=== Acting ===
- A Beautiful Sunday (Un beau dimanche) (short film by Lucie Blush, 2016)
- The Bitchhiker (short film d’Olympe de G., 2016, produced Erika Lust)
- Architecture Porn (short film by Erika Lust, 2017)

== Audiography ==
- The pink app (erotic audio fiction series, 2018, produced by Audible)
- Room 206 (Chambre 206) (immersive audio work, 2018, produced by Audible)
- The sound of sex (Le Son du sexe) (audio documentary, 2018, for Rinse FM)
- Voxxx (independent podcast, 2018 and 2019)
- Coxxx (independent podcast)
- Boxxx (independent podcast)

== Awards ==
Olympe de G. has won several awards, including Most Tantalizing Trans Short for We Are the (Fucking) World at the Toronto International Porn Film Festival, the Insomnia Award for Don't Call Me a Dick at La Guarimba Film Festival, Best Experimental short for Don't Call Me a Dick at Cine Kink.
