= Rashed Rababah =

Jordanian journalist

Rashed Rababah is a Jordanian journalist and television news presenter, widely known as Jordan's first visually impaired newscaster. He is also one of the first in the Arab world to present the news while using Braille.

== Early life and education ==
Rbabah was born in the city of Irbid and is visually impaired from birth. Most of his early education took place in institutions serving visually impaired students. His later studies were in the fields of media and communication at university, where he developed an interest in journalism and broadcasting.

== Career ==
Rababah's first steps in the media world were in radio, where he gained experience in news delivery. This experience helped him with his transition in to television journalism. In 2021, after joining an online news platform, he became the first visually impaired news presenter in Jordan. In 2023 he joined Roya TV, where he presented news bulletins for the channel. Rababah prepared and read the news by using the Braille system, translating the scripts into Braille before going on air. His time at Roya TV made him one of the first visually impaired news presenters on an Arabic satellite channel.

== Recognition and impact ==
Rababah's work is seen as an important step for making Arab media more inclusive. Many media groups and officials have praised his appointment as a positive move to help people with disabilities become part of professional journalism. He is considered as a role model for disabled people in Jordan and Arab countries, he shows that media jobs can become more accessible and include better representation for everyone.
