= Deema Hijjawi =

Jordanian celebrity chef

- Born: 1977 (age 48–49)
- Years active: 2000 onward
- Known for: Deema Hijjawi Cooking Club
- Culinary career
- Cooking style: Arab fusion
- Television show: Dunya Ya Dunya
- Website: https://www.instagram.com/deemahajjawi/

Deema Hijjawi (Arabic: ديما حجاوي; born 1977) is a Jordanian chef, writer and television presenter. She is the founder of the Deema Hijjawi Cooking Club, and is one of social media's most followed Arab chefs.

== Biography ==
Hijjawi is a chef and television presenter. She studied literature at Ajman University. Interested in cookery since childhood, in 2000 she founded her first catering business. In 2012, she joined the Roya TV channel, presenting on a popular morning program Dunya Ya Dunya, where she presents a live cooking segment twice a week. She is the founder of the Deema Hijjawi Cooking Club, which aims to teach the basic principles and techniques of cooking, as well as how to prepare new dishes, through intensive cooking lessons. She is a product ambassador for Unilever, Philips appliances and Knorr in the Middle East. With a strong social media presence, she is one of the most followed Arab chefs. In 2020 she was featured in Hospitality Magazine where she predicted that the popularity of virtual cooking classes would rise. She is an exponent of Jordanian and Arabic cuisine, including qatayef.

== Books ==
- Tasty Temptations (2009)
- Secret Ingredients (2011)
- مطبخ ديما حجاوي [in English: Dima Hajjawi's Kitchen] (2014)
