= La Guarimba International Film Festival =

Film festival in Italy

- Location: Amantea, Calabria, Italy
- Established: 2013; 13 years ago
- Founded by: Giulio Vita, Sara Fratini
- Festival date: 7–12 August

La Guarimba International Film Festival was first hosted in 2013 in Amantea, Calabria, Italy.

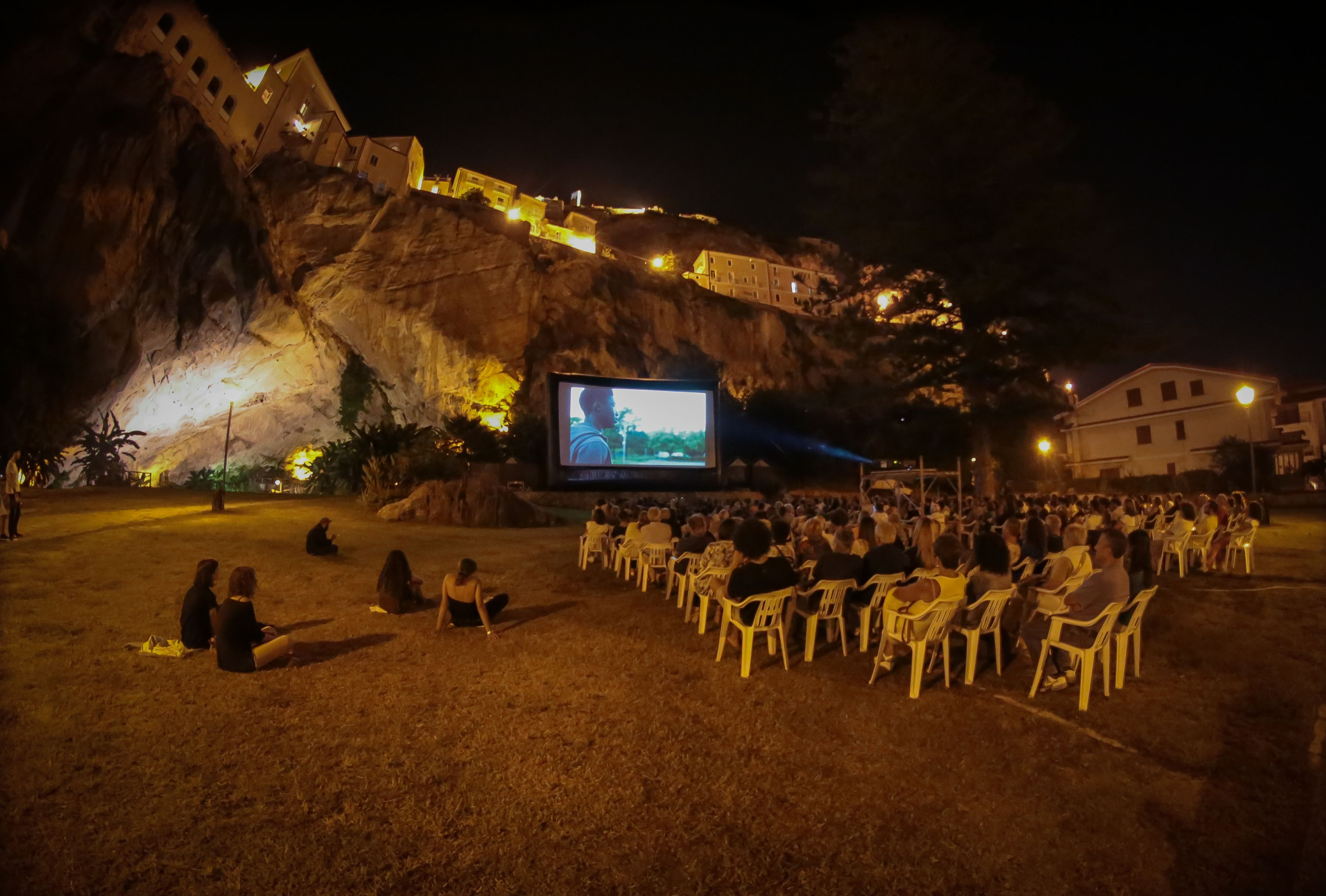
La Guarimba International Film Festival in La Grotta Park, Amantea.

La Guarimba International Film Festival is an annual international film festival held in Amantea, Calabria, Italy in collaboration with UNICEF that showcases fiction, animation, documentary, experimental film and music video short films.

The festival was inaugurated in 2013.

== History ==
La Guarimba International Film Festival was established by filmmaker Giulio Vita and illustrator Sara Fratini in Amantea, Calabria.

The first festival was held in August 2013. The opening ceremony took place at the Arena Sicoli, an open-air cinema that had been closed for several years and was renovated for the festival with the help of local residents and the venue's owners.

From 2014 to 2020, the festival was held at La Grotta Park in Amantea. After part of the grotto walls collapsed in early 2021, the site was declared unsafe, prompting organizers to move the 2021 event to a temporary venue. In late 2021, the La Guarimba Cultural Association acquired a property known as Il Terrenito in Central Amantea, which became the festival's permanent venue in 2022.

== Organizers ==
The festival was founded by Giulio Vita, Sara Fratini, and two members of the Spanish film collective El Tornillo de Klaus — Pablo Cristóbal and Alicia Victoria Palacios Thomas — with the aim of gathering independent artists and audiovisual critics. The idea for the festival originated in Madrid, where Vita had studied cinema and Fratini had studied fine arts. It was there that they met members of the El Tornillo de Klaus collective and worked with them for the launch and development of La Guarimba International Film Festival.

== Illustration exhibition ==
Sara Fratini founded the open-air illustration exhibition Artists for La Guarimba, curated by Giulio Vita and Valeria Weerasinghe. Each year, international illustrators create a festival poster in their style, using the official poster made by Mikel Murillo as their inspiration. The exhibition is open during the festival and in various places along the tour.

Some posters have won awards and the recognition of American Illustration, including Meredith Jansen's in 2020 and Natalya Balnova's in 2015.

== Editions ==
La Guarimba was launched on August 7, 2013, and has taken place each summer since its inaugural edition.

=== First edition ===
The first edition of the festival took place 5–10 August, 2013. Of the 303 short films that applied, 10 fiction films, 5 animated films, and 5 documentaries were selected. An exhibition of 30 posters by artists worldwide was also held.

As part of the German project "A Wall is A Screen", several screenings were projected on the walls of buildings in the streets of Amantea. The opening titles for the first edition were produced by TKSH Film Production.

=== Second edition ===
The second edition of the festival took place 7–14 August 2014.

For the first time, the festival took place in the La Grotta di Amantea natural park, and a screen was installed on the slopes of the cave.

=== Third edition ===
The third edition of the festival took place 7–11 August 2015. This edition drew in more than a thousand people. 30 posters made by artists globally were exhibited.

The American video hosting platform Vimeo was present at the festival to promote Vimeo On Demand. After it, a special program created by Sam Morril was screened.

=== Fourth edition ===
The fourth edition of the festival took place 7–11 August 2016. Over 1,300 short films globally participated in the selection. This edition was dedicated to Chinese and Japanese cinema, celebrating 150 years of cultural exchange between Italy and these two countries.

During the festival, the category of La Grotta dei Piccoli (films for children) was introduced, with screenings of animated short films in a space dedicated to children.

=== Fifth edition ===
The fifth edition of the festival took place between the 7th and the 11th of August 2017. The theme of this edition was 'Propaganda during the Cold War era'. The program brought together short films of different genres from all major continents. Once again, Vimeo presented its "Vimeo Staff Pick". In addition, a program dedicated to African films was created.

The program also included an exhibition of illustrations, a natural clothing dyeing workshop together with the Fragmentario Collective, and an African dance workshop.

=== Sixth edition ===
The sixth edition of the festival took place 7–11 August 2018. 1,500 short films from all over the world took part in the selection, with 68 works in competition divided into the categories fiction, animation, documentary, insomnia (Experimental Films), and La Grotta dei Piccoli.

It also included an exhibition of illustrations, a film residency project, two concerts and a conference day entitled "Young African Filmmakers and the future of African Cinema".

=== Seventh edition ===
The seventh edition of the festival took place between the 7th and 11th of August 2019. With more than 1,000 short films participated in the selection of 152 works from 42 countries, in five categories (fiction, animation, documentary, insomnia, and La Grotta dei Piccoli).

The international jury was composed of Jeanette Bonds (United States), founder and director of the GLAS Animation Festival, Éva Katinka Bógnar (Hungary), teacher and animation director, as well as Norma Guevara (France), director of the Women Film Festival Network.

It was launched with a collective cleaning of Amantea's beach in collaboration with the NGO and Parley for the Oceans. In the following days, workshops, concerts, industry conferences, a narration seminar in collaboration with Scuola Holden, photographic exhibitions, and an exhibition of illustrations were organized.

=== Eighth edition ===
The eighth edition of the festival took place 7–12 August 2020. In spite of the COVID-19 pandemic which forced the majority of festivals to be held online, La Guarimba held a face-to-face event, with over 3,000 admissions over 6 days.

1,160 short films participated in the selection. 160 works coming from 54 countries worldwide in the usual five categories (fiction, animation, documentary, Insomnia, and La Grotta dei Piccoli) were selected for the competition.

The eighth edition of the festival received the Medal of the Representation from the Italian president, Sergio Mattarella, the High Patronage of the European Parliament, the Patronage of the Council of Ministers, and the support of the embassies of the Netherlands, Germany, Ireland, Canada, Australia, Sweden, Norway, the Austrian Cultural Forum, and the Flemish State of Arts.

In February 2020, the municipality of Amantea was dissolved due to fraud and mafia infiltration. This caused the closure of La Grotta Park for a year. Therefore, the association engaged in an urban restoration project, cleaning up the park and restoring the facilities, thus allowing the park to reopen to the public.

=== Ninth edition ===
The ninth edition of the festival took place 7–12 August 2021. 1,174 short films participated in the selection, with 172 films in competition from 56 countries (5 African countries, 13 Asian, 28 European, 9 American, 1 Oceanic), in the usual five categories: fiction, animation, documentary, experimental, and Children's Films.

The ninth edition received the Medal of Representation from the Italian president, Sergio Mattarella, the High Patronage of the European Parliament, the Patronage of the Council of Ministers and the Award of Representation of the Chamber of Deputies. It was sponsored by the Italian Ministry of Culture, the European Commission, the Austrian Cultural Forum, Malta, San Marino, the Flemish State of the Arts, the Polish Institute in Rome, and the embassies in Italy of the United States, the Netherlands, Germany, Switzerland, Lithuania, Ireland, Norway, Australia, and Canada.

Due to the collapse of a rocky ridge in the historic center of Amantea which made the Parco La Grotta unusable, the festival was held at an abandoned parking lot which was cleaned and cleared as part of a larger urban renewal project. Two murals by street artists Sara Fratini and Cesáh were created.

=== Tenth edition ===
The tenth edition of the festival took place 7–12 August 2022.

163 short films were screened, from 54 countries. There were 5 main categories: fiction, animation, documentary, music video, and insomnia (experimental films), as well as a selection of a hundred short films for children and young people. The special program Dance Films! was a category curated by Francheska Rodriguez, who introduced the selection by celebrating the fusion between dance and cinema and recognizing its artistic and narrative richness.

In celebration of its 10th anniversary, it also presented 4 special programs: Indigenous Films, dedicated to 5 Indigenous cultures from 5 continents; a screen for short films from California's GLAS Animation Festival, a partner of La Guarimba; Sláva Ukrayíni!, a screening of Ukrainian movies in support of the directors affected by the Russo-Ukrainian war; and Taiwan Focus which celebrated the Taiwanese independent cinema and hosted the Ambassador of Taiwan, Andrea Sing-Ying Lee, at the Holy See.

=== Eleventh edition ===
The eleventh edition took place 7–12 August 2023 at Il Terrenito. La Grotta Park, which hosted the previous edition, was closed at the beginning of the year due to unsafe conditions.

This edition received the same rewards as the previous years. Among the 1,246 short films received, 159 films from 45 countries were screened.

There were 5 categories shown in 2023: fiction, animation, documentary, music video, and insomnia (experimental films). Like every year, La Grotta dei Piccoli also presented a selection of a hundred short films for children and young people.

During this edition, some programs were also presented: the short documentary film UNHCR: Rebuilding Ukraine, which showed the humanitarian aid process in Ukraine; the program Stories from Iran during which one of three films from independent filmmakers (including two women) was screened; and the special program titled Feminist Porn.

=== Twelfth edition ===
The twelfth edition took place 7–12 August 2024, at Il Terrenito.

This edition received the same awards as the previous years. Among the 1,044 short films received, 158 films from 52 countries were screened in five categories: fiction, animation, documentary, music video, and insomnia (experimental films). Like every year, La Grotta dei Piccoli also presented a selection of a hundred short films for children and young people.

=== Thirteenth edition ===
The thirteenth edition took place 7–12 August 2025, at Il Terrenito.

This edition received the same awards as the previous years. Among the 1,290 short films received, 193 films from 67 countries were screened.

There were 6 categories shown in 2025: fiction, animation, documentary, music video, insomnia (experimental films), and dance. Like every year, La Grotta dei Piccoli also presented a selection of a hundred short films for children and young people.

During this edition, some special programs were also presented: "Serato Animato", an Italian animators' collective curated a program of 15 animated shorts for the final night of the festival. At Grotta dei Piccoli, a program called "Sunday Cinema / Films of Resistance" was screened on the final evening of the festival. This is a collection of short animated films by Haneen Koraz, Nour A-Jawad, and Shorook Darwish. The films were created in collaboration with displaced children in Gaza.

== Disputes ==
=== Conflict between open-air summer festivals and distributors ===
During preparation for the eighth edition of the festival, La Guarimba was involved in a complaint against the professional associations of distributors and film directors, Anica and Anec. The associations had given "written indications to Italian and foreign distributors to not grant licenses for the screening of films in free entry on Italian territory," which resulted in 235 denied permits out of 263 applications, even though the films had completed their commercial exploitation in theaters. This was later noted during the parliamentary question of June 18, 2020.

To guarantee the provision of a free service aimed at promoting film culture in the territory, several parliamentarians asked the Ministry of Culture to monitor the action of complaint involving La Guarimba International Film Festival together with other Italian associations. The parliamentarians acknowledged the significant role played by the associations mentioned in the case on the cultural and social level, which "allows citizens from all social classes to have access to culture, with the aim of giving a new market value to dated or independent works and contribute to the creation of a film education." Additionally, they guaranteed psychological and social support and acted as a source of cultural engagement in an emergency period during which Italy was affected.

It was underlined that "the films have already concluded their period of commercial exploitation in the cinemas, in free-to-air television, in paid television, in streaming and on DVD and do not include titles present on the market in the current film season", thus contesting the indications of Anica and Anec who, in the past, did not grant licenses for the screenings during free film events on the Italian territory. This negatively affected the free service offered by cultural associations and encouraging organizers to consider the possibility of payment for citizens.

=== The case of Abbas Nadeem ===
The festival team assisted Abbas Mian Nadeem, a young Pakistani migrant who had been expelled from Amantea. La Guarimba collaborated with authorities to facilitate his return and access to legal support.

=== Position in favor of Ukraine ===
The festival publicly opposed the Russian invasion of Ukraine in 2022 through several actions. Ukrainian filmmakers have been granted an exemption from paying registration fees for the festival with the creation of the special program Sláva Ukrayíni! All producers, directors, and distributors who expressed clear positions in favor of Putin were excluded, while Russian directors who took a public stand against the invasion were selected. The festival organized the screening of the documentary "The Earth is Blue as an Orange", directed by Iryna Tsilyk, winner of the Director's Award in the "World Cinema Documentary" category at the Sundance Film Festival 2020.

== The Monkey's School ==
In 2014, the cultural association La Guarimba won a public tender from the Apulia region, which allowed it to create The Monkey's School (Scuola Delle Scimmie). It is the first accessible independent film and illustration school based on the Montessori Model of Participatory Democracy. In September 2014, La Guarimba created a workshop with 45 young people on the subjects of illustration and cinema.

== Tour ==
After each edition, La Guarimba organizes a tour during which the films in competition are presented.

In 2013, the festival participated in the fourth edition of Pane, Web e Salame as the first Calabrian representative of the event.

As part of the sixth edition of the Workshop on Social Enterprise, held in Riva del Garda in 2013, Giulio Vita was invited to speak about the impact that the reopening of the Arena Sicoli had on the community of Amantea during the festival.

In September 2013, La Guarimba was invited by the Cultural Association La Scheggia to participate in the Cinema Beltrade film cycle. The award-winning short films in the first edition were screened there, accompanied by a speech from the director of the winning documentary short, Benedetta Panisson. In June 2015, TEDxPompeii invited Giulio Vita, the founder of the festival, to tell the story of La Guarimba.

== Awards ==
In 2020, on the occasion of the eighth edition, the Audience Award for the best short film in competition was dedicated to Vitaliano Camarca, creator of the program "Film Mediterraneo" in Amantea.

From the first edition of the festival to the twelfth, the Nonna Saveria Award was chosen by Vita's grandmother, who died in September 2024. For the 2025 edition of the festival, the award was re-imagined as a way to honor a member of the local community who supports and helps make the festival happen, rather than a film and filmmaker. In 2025, it was awarded to Filippo Vita, father of Giulio Vita.

2025
Category	Film	Director	Nationality
Best Fiction	A Son and A Father	Andrés Ramírez Pulido	Colombia / France
Best Animation	The Golden Donkey	Anne Verbeure	Belgium
Best Documentary	Shadows	Rand Beiruty	Jordan / France
Best Music Video	Sexual Misery	Ingrid Heiderscheidt	Belgium
Best Experimental	Beyond the Façade	Eyup Kus	Austria
Vitaliano Camarca Audience Award	The Leader Will Come	Michiel Geluykens and Manuel Janssens	Belgium
La Grotta dei Piccoli Award	Amen	Orphee Courtier, Bettina Demarty, Kimie Maingonnat, Laurène Perego, Louise Poulain, Avril Zunde	France
Guarimberos Award	Children of the Bird	Julia Tudisco	Hungary
2024
Category	Film	Director	Nationality
Best Fiction	Cross My Heart and Hope To Die	Sam Manacsa	Philippines
Best Animation	Nun or Never	Heta Jäälinoja	Finland
Best Documentary	The Moon Will Contain Us	Kim Torres	Costa Rica
Best Music Video	Météores	Agnès Patron, Morgane Le Péchon	France
Best Experimental	Ardent Other	Alice Brygo	France
Vitaliano Camarca Audience Award	Radio Perla Del Tirreno	Noemi Arfuso	Italy
La Grotta dei Piccoli Award	My Name Is Edgar And I Have A Cow	Filip Diviak	Czech Republic
Nonna Saveria Award	Radio Perla Del Tirreno	Noemi Arfuso	Italy
Guarimberos Award	Drizzle In Johnson	Ivan Li	Canada
2023
Category	Film	Director	Nationality
Best Fiction	Our males and females	Ahmad Alyaseer	Jordan
Best Animation	My Year of Dicks	Sara Gunnarsdóttir	United States
Best Documentary	Apostles of cinema	Darragh Amelia, Gertrude Malizana, Jesse Gerard Mpango, Cece Mlay	Tanzania
Best Music Video	Chasseur chassé	Lolita Do Peso Diogo, Gabriel Wéber	France
Best Experimental	AMO	Emmanuel Gras	France
Vitaliano Camarca Audience Award	An Irish goodbye	Tom Berkeley and Ross White	United Kingdom
La Grotta dei Piccoli Award	It was only a rock that looked like someone	Matisse Gonzalez	Mexico / Bolivia
Nonna Saveria Award	The other end of the street	Kálmán Nagy	Austria
Guarimberos Award	Romeo	Sara G. Cortijo	Spain
2022
Category	Film	Director	Nationality
Best Fiction	The Criminals	Serhat Karaaslan	Turkey
Best Animation	Bestia	Hugo Covarrubias	Chile
Best Documentary	Salvo	Federico Cammarata	Italy
Best Music Video	Summer 91	Rupert Holler	Austria
Best Experimental	Motorcyclist's happiness won't fit into his suit	Gabriel Herrera	Mexico
Vitaliano Camarca Audience Award	Like the Ones I Used to Know	Annie St-Pierre	Canada
La Grotta dei Piccoli Award	Bye Little Block!	Éva Darabos	Hungary
Nonna Saveria Award	Lili Alone	Zou Jing	China
Guarimberos Award	Los Colores del Niño Dios	Santiago Pérez Rodríguez	Colombia
2021
Category	Film	Director	Nationality
Best Fiction	The Unseen River	Phạm Ngọc Lân	Vietnam
Best Animation	Nuevo Rico	Kris Mercado	United States / Puerto Rico
Best Documentary	Just A Guy	Shoko Hara	Germany / Japan
Best Music Video	Never Ever	Evgeniy Bakirov	Russia
Best Experimental	Red Aninsri; Or, Tiptoeing on the Still Trembling Berlin Wall (Aninsri Daeng)	Ratchapoom Boonbunchachoke	Thailand
Vitaliano Camarca Audience Award	3 Meetings Of The Extraordinary Committee	Jones	United Kingdom / Bulgaria
La Grotta dei Piccoli Award	Mum Is Pouring Rain	Hugo de Faucompret	France
Nonna Saveria Award	God Was Here!	Raluca Lupascu	Netherlands / Romania
2020
Category	Film	Director	Nationality
Best Fiction	El Puente de los Niños Traviesos	Fabián León López	Mexico
Best Animation	Why Slugs have no Legs	Aline Höchli	Switzerland
Best Documentary	All Cats are Gray in the Dark	Lasse Linder	Switzerland
Best Music Video	Traveler	Raman Djafari & Daniel Almagor	Germany
Best Experimental	Don't Know What	Thomas Renoldner	Australia
Vitaliano Camarca Audience Award	Maradona's Legs	Firas Khoury	Germany / Palestine
La Grotta dei Piccoli Award	And yet we're not superheroes	Lia Bertels	Belgium / Portugal
Nonna Saveria Award	Year of the robot	Yves Gellie	France / Belgium
2019
Category	Film	Director	Nationality
Best Fiction	Fauve	Jérémy Comte	Canada
Best Animation	I'm Going Out for Cigarettes	Osman Cerfon	France
Best Documentary	The Migrating Image	Stefan Kruse	Denmark
Best Music Video	Not Enough	Bear Damen	Netherlands
Best Experimental	Mudanza Contemporánea	Teo Guillem	Spain
Vitaliano Camarca Audience Award	Sisters	Daphne Lucker	Netherlands
La Grotta dei Piccoli Award	Le Mans 1955	Quentin Baillieux	France
Nonna Saveria Award	Tungrus	Rishi Chandna	India
Guarimberos Award	Bamboe	Flo Van Deuren	Belgium
2018
Category	Film	Director	Nationality
Best Fiction	Mum, I'm Back	Dimitris Katsimiris	Greece
Best Animation	Wildebeest	Nicolas Keppens & Matthias Phlips	Belgium
Best Documentary	Rewind Forward	Justin Stoneham	Switzerland
Best Music Video	Solicitous	Zuzanna Plisz	Poland
Best Experimental	Don't Call Me a Dick	Olympe de G.	Spain
Audience Award	Bolbol	Khedija Lemkecher	Tunisia
La Grotta dei Piccoli Award	Big Booom	Marat Narimanov	Russia
Guarimberos Award	Sherry	Eliane Lima	United States
2017
Category	Film	Director	Nationality
Best Fiction	Clan	Stefanie Kolk	Netherlands
Best Animation	Ivan's Need	Veronica L. Montaño, Manuela Leuenberger & Lukas Suter	Switzerland
Best Documentary	In The Woods	Thomas Horat & Corina Schwingruber Ilić	Switzerland
Best Music Video	Ghost	Suzanna Plisz	Poland
Audience Award	One seat In The Plane	Khadidiatou Sow	Senegal
2016
Category	Film	Director	Nationality
Best Fiction	The Passion Of Judas	David Pantaleón	Spain
Best Animation	Manoman	Simon Cartwright	United Kingdom
Best Documentary	I Don't Want To Sleep With You I Just Want To Make You Hard	Momoko Seto	France
Best Music Video	Through My Street	Piet Baumgartner	Switzerland
Audience Award	56	Marco Huertas	Spain / Madagascar / Norway
2015
Category	Film	Director	Nationality
Best Fiction	Fragments	Aga Woszczynska	Poland
Best Animation	Roadtrip	Xaver Xylophon	Germany
Best Documentary	Autonomous	Alexander Rynéus & Per Eriksson	Sweden
2014
Category	Film	Director	Nationality
Best Fiction	This is Ronald	Jules Comes	Belgium
Best Animation	Pandy	Matúš Vizár	Czech Republic / Slovakia
Best Documentary	L'Ultimo Imperatore – Intervista a Pierino Brunelli	Carlani e Dogana	Italy
2013
Category	Film	Director	Nationality
Best Fiction	Home	Ruslan Magomadov	Russia (Chechen Republic)
Best Animation	Oh Willy...	Emma De Swaef & Marc James Roels	Belgium
Best Documentary	Come To Venice	Benedetta Panisson	Italy
Audience Award	Zombi	David Moreno	Spain
