= Ahmad Alyaseer =

Jordanian director, producer and writer

- أحمد اليسير
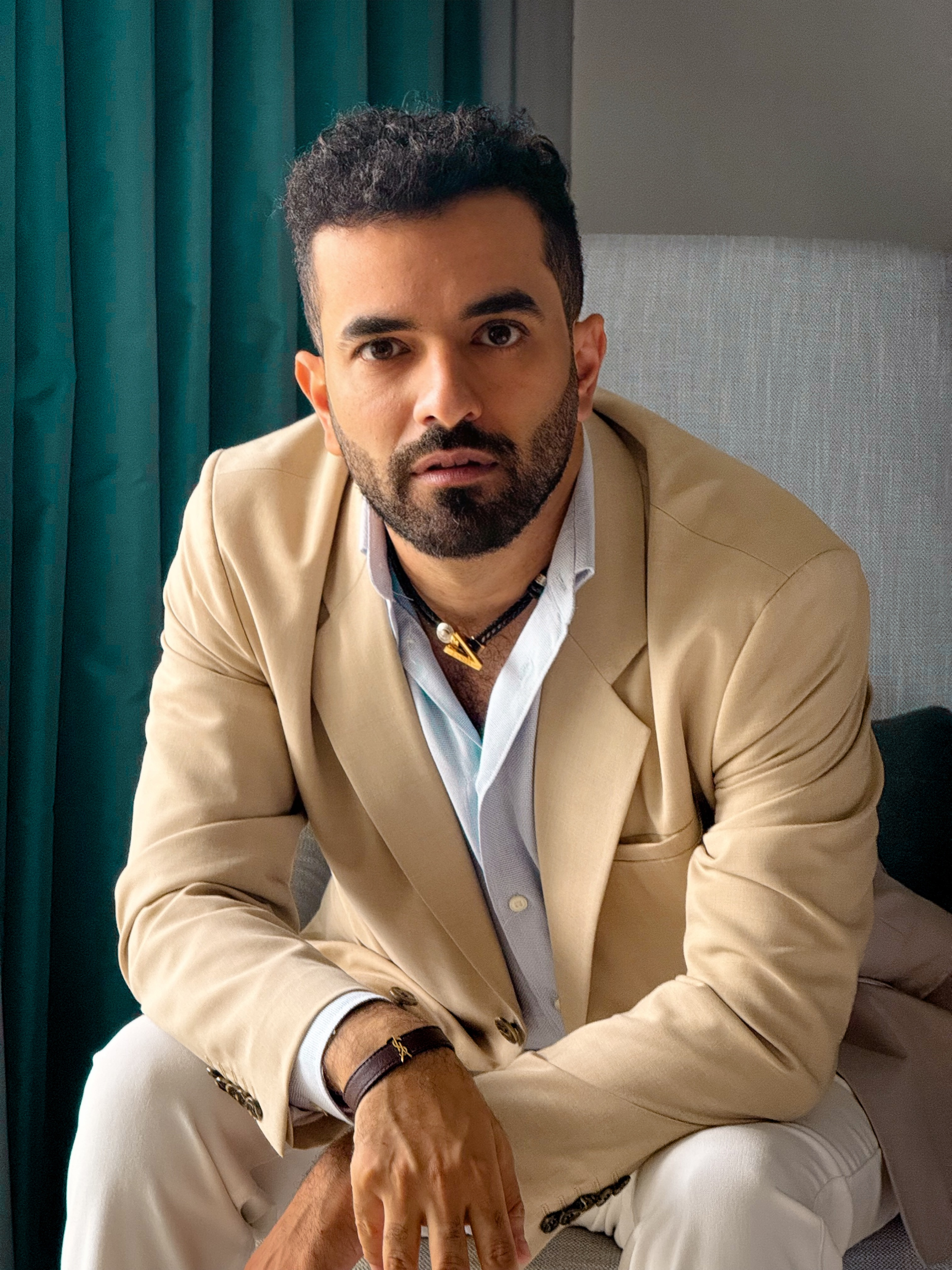
- Ahmad Alyaseer in 2026
- Born: Amman, Jordan
- Occupations: Director, Producer and Author

Ahmad Alyaseer (Arabic: أحمد اليسير) is a Jordanian director, producer and writer.

== Movies ==
=== Our Males and Females ===
Ahmad directed the short film Our Males and Females, produced by Ahmad himself, Mais Salman, and co-written with his sister. The film has a runtime of 11 minutes and had its world premiere in 2023. It has received significant international recognition, officially selected for over 160 film festivals across 47 countries and winning an impressive 124 awards. Notably, it won the Best Narrative Short award at the Nashville Film Festival, making it eligible for consideration in the Academy Award for Best Live Action Short Film category.

The film has garnered widespread acclaim from film critics. Brian Penn of UK Film Review awarded it 4/5 stars, praising its sensitivity and contemporary twist. Bobby Lepire from Film Threat gave it a 9/10 rating, highlighting the impactful and shocking ending. Matt Fagerholm of RogerEbert.com called the film brutally painful yet necessary, emphasizing its portrayal of parental shame. Steve Kopian deemed it an absolute must-see and one of the best and most haunting films of 2023.

=== When Time Becomes a Woman ===
Ahmad directed the first Jordanian Sci-Fi Feature When Time Becomes a Woman. The film was an experimental project for his graduation project submission at Middlesex University and won awards at several film festivals yet it did not do well in Jordan. Critics praised the film for minimalist elements and was described as a "breath of fresh air in the genre". Despite the film's small budget, the crew got some impressive results. It was first premiered in 2012.

== TV shows ==
The below are titles of TV shows produced and directed by Ahmad Alyaseer

=== Ahlan Simsim ===
The Arabic version of Sesame Street. The show started broadcasting in 2019. It is part of The International Rescue Committee (IRC) and Sesame Workshop who have launched a joint initiative to provide millions of refugee children in the region with an educational programme in Arabic. The show has introduced three new muppets and was fueled by a $100 million grant provided by the MacArthur Foundation in 2017. The show was nominated for an International Emmy Award.

=== This is Earth ===
A light pan-Arab sitcom featuring social media stars from all over the Middle East. The show aired in April 2020. It was produced by Ahmad Alyaseer and directed by Alaa Ismail the director of El Plato. The show was on Shahid and MBC.

=== Weapon Without Murder ===
The show premiered on October 25, 2019. Ahmad Alyaseer described the show as very challenging for being one of the very few modern Jordanian Dramas that the audience are not used to.

=== Jalta Season 2 ===
The show premiered on May 5, 2019. The show was the most watched in Jordan and praised for bringing the light family Jordan sitcoms back after they were very popular in the early 90s.

=== Click ===
The show premiered on May 17, 2018, with Ro'ya TV and Viu Streaming Service and was praised for its technical quality and concept it featured stars from different nationalities including the Syrian comedian Andre Skaf.

=== Latt Wa Ajen ===
The mini- series premiered on 27, May, 2017 with the online channel Kharabeesh and Ro'ya TV in the month of Ramadan. The series marked the first acting experience for the Jordanian TV Presenter Nadia Al Zoubi. The show highlights women issues such as divorce, work, study and parenting.

=== Asfoureyyeh (The Nuthouse) ===
The series premiered on November 11, 2015, with Ro'ya TV, and was praised for being the first Jordanian Sitcom. A second season aired in 2017. Asfoureyyeh was the first acting experience for several Jordanian social media stars such as Omar Zorba, Lina Abu Rezeq and Rawsan Hallak.

== Books ==
=== My Trip to Adele ===
The novel is co-written with his sister Rana Alyaseer and was released on September 10, 2016 but was removed from online platforms in August 2017 for copyright infringement. The authors released the novel again without the lyrics. The novel was praised for its controversial topics such as atheism, child prostitution, black magic and divorce laws in third world countries.

=== Lasto Qedesa (I’m not a Saint) ===
I'm not a saint (Arabic: لست قديسة) is the second novel by Ahmad and Rana Alyaseer. It is in Arabic and was released with Arab Scientific Publishers in May, 2018.

=== Between Wuhun and Finland, a Cold Sun ===
Between Wuhun and Finland, a Cold Sun (Arabic: بين ووهان وفنلندا شمس باردة ) is an Arabic novel released in January 2021 by Arab Scientific Publishers. It follows the story of four people who get involved in a conspiracy so much bigger than them about the corona virus.
