= Firas Khoury =

Palestinian film director and screenwriter

- فراس خوري
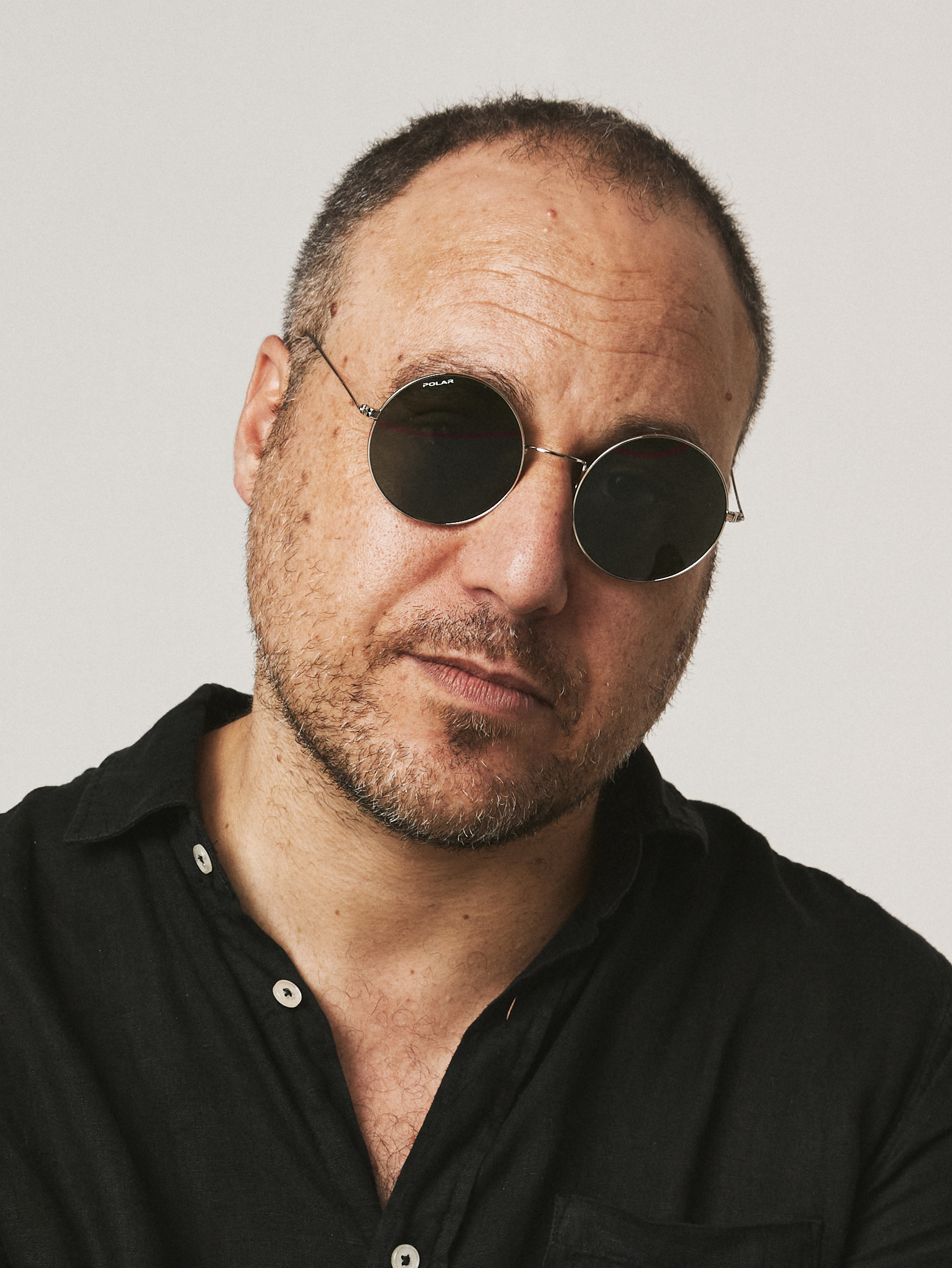
- Born: 1982
- Occupations: Director, screenwriter, actor
- Years active: 2005–present

Firas Khoury (Arabic: فراس خوري) is a Palestinian film director and screenwriter. He is best known for directing the feature film Alam and short film Maradona's Legs.

== Career ==
Firas graduated from Tel Aviv University with a BFA in Film. He previously appeared in what is considered to be the first Israeli reality tv show, ''Project Y'', and won its first season (2003). He also appeared in the Ron Cahlili documentary series Achlu Li Shatu Li - The Next Generation (2016).

In 2008, Khoury attended the Berlinale Talent Campus. He taught cinematic expression at the Freedom Theatre in Jenin Camp.

Khoury is the founder of Falastinema Group, which presents screenings and cinema activities throughout Palestine. In 2010, his short film Yellow Mums won the Best Short Film at the Jerusalem Film Festival.

Khoury's short film Maradona's Legs premiered at the Palm Springs International Film Festival in 2019.

Khoury wrote and directed his debut feature Alam, which had its world premiere at the 2022 Toronto International Film Festival, and won the Golden Pyramid from the Cairo International Film Festival for best film.

== Filmography ==
Year	Title	Writer	Director	Note
2005	Islamic	✓	✓	Short film
2006	Two Arabs	✓	✓	Short film
2006	Hit Man	✓	✓	Short film
2007	Seven Days in Deir Bulus	✓	✓	Short film
2010	Yellow Mums	✓	✓	Short Film
2011	Responsibility	✓	✓	Short Film
2017	And an Image Was Born	✓	✓	Short Film
2019	Maradona's Legs	✓	✓	Short Film
2022	Alam	✓	✓	Feature Film
TBA	Dear Tarkovsky	✓	✓	Feature Film

As Actor

- 2008 - On Any Saturday
- 2011 - The Promise
- 2012 - The Attack

== Awards and nominations ==
Year	Result	Award	Category	Work	Ref.
2022	Won	Cairo International Film Festival	Best film	Alam	
2022	Nominated	Asia Pacific Screen Awards	Best Youth Feature Film	Alam	
2019	Won	Sedicicorto International Film Festival	International Competition	Maradona's Legs	
2020	Won	Tampere Film Festival	International Competition	Maradona's Legs	
2020	Won	La Guarimba International Film Festival	Best Short Film	Maradona's Legs	
2020	Won	Aesthetica Short Film Festival	Best Comedy	Maradona's Legs	
