= In the Presence of Justice =

2013 Palestinian TV series

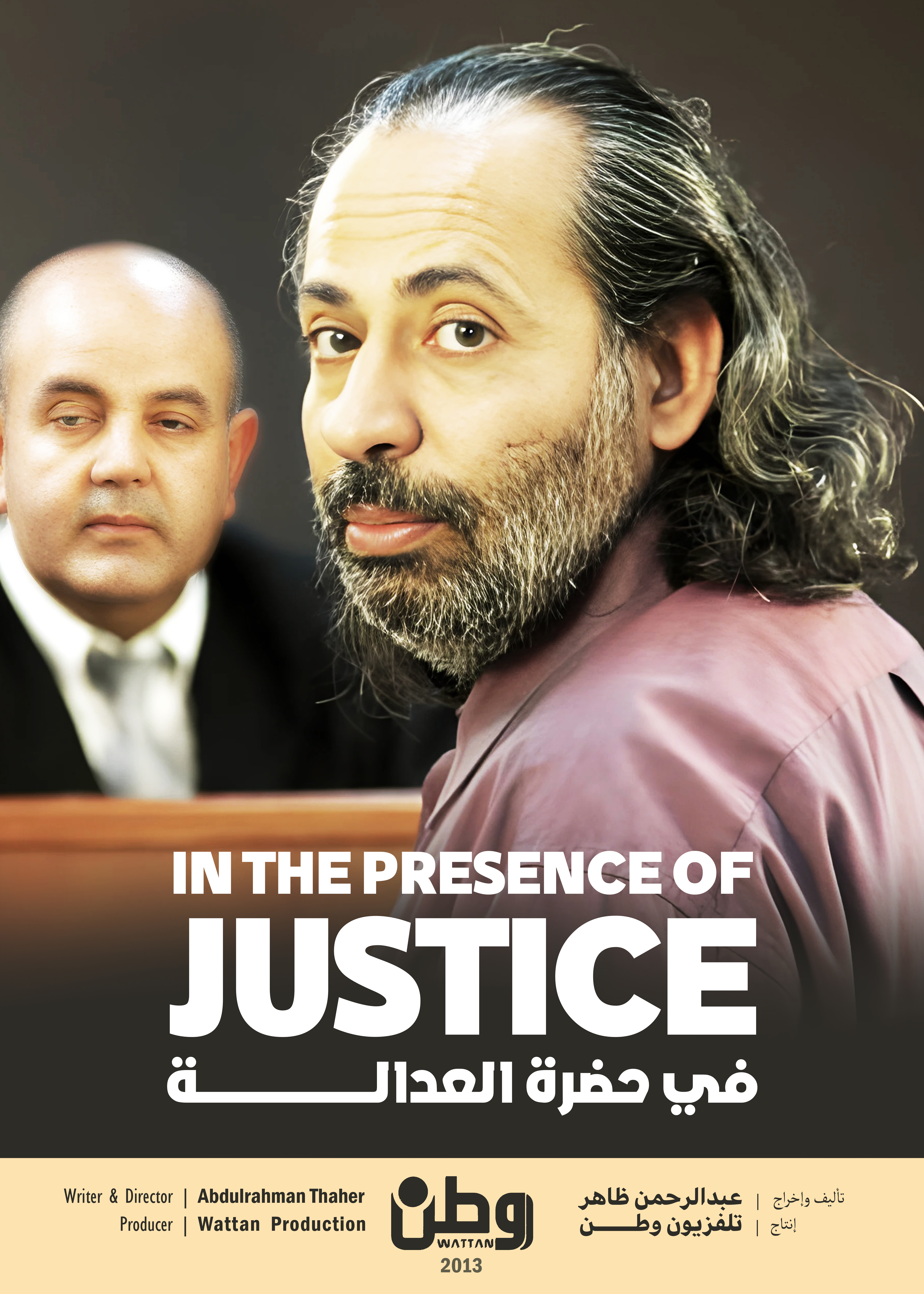
- Poster
- Arabic: في حضرة العدالة
- Genre: Drama; Vagueness; Crime
- Created by: Abdulrahman Thaher
- Inspired by: Real stories from criminal judicial files
- Written by: Abdulrahman Thaher
- Directed by: Abdulrahman Thaher
- Starring: Mustafa Abu Hanoud, Hussein Nakhleh, Rafat Lafi
- Music by: Maher Al-Hlow
- Country of origin: Palestine
- Original language: Arabic
- No. of episodes: 8

Production
- Producer: Wattan TV
- Production locations: West Bank, Palestine

Original release
- Release: 2013 – 2014

In the Presence of Justice (Arabic: في حضرة العدالة) is a Palestinian TV series focused on crime and police investigations, created by Abdulrahman Thaher. With eight stand-alone episodes that dramatize actual events based on criminal court records, it debuted in 2013. Several well-known Arab and Palestinian actors appear in the series.

== Writing the stories ==
During the initial stages of preparing the series, the writer, Abdulrahman Thaher, received special permission from the High Judicial Council of Palestine to access the court, examine specific criminal cases, and observe particular trial sessions. After reviewing files from special investigations, he transformed some of them into dramatic scripts, ensuring that he altered names, places, and certain details to protect the confidentiality of the cases. A dedicated legal committee subsequently reviewed his scripts and granted approval for production.

== Plot ==
The stories revolve around several crimes that actually happened, starting with the kidnapping and blackmail of a hotel manager, followed by the armed robbery and kidnapping of a famous doctor, a factory fire, drug trafficking, premeditated murders, the use of magic and sorcery, the killing of a bewitched person, and the impersonation of a senior security officer to exploit that role in committing major crimes. The stories take place in the locations where they occurred, police investigation rooms, prosecution offices, and courtrooms.

== Cast ==
- Mustafa Abu Hanoud
- Raafat Lafi
- Rawan Farhat
- Samira Natour
- Amjad Ghanem
- Muhammad Abu Aziza
- Abdullah Enkhili
- Nawal Hijazi
- Osama Malhas
- Akram Al-Maliki
- Hussein Nakhleh
- Reem Al-Low
- Ihab Zahida
- Mahmoud Khalil
- Moayad Odeh
- Haroun Rasheed
- Nour Arar
- Jack Saadeh
- Reem Sharhah
- Lina Qadri
- Rawan Zahran
- Sirin Abu Akar
- Lara Nassar
- Nour Khalil
- Majed Almani
- Nidal Taha
- Samah Abu Akar
- Kimo
