= New Year Baby =

- Directed by: Socheata Poeuv
- Produced by: Charles Vogl & Jason Bolling
- Starring: Socheata Poeuv
- Cinematography: Jason Bolling
- Edited by: Sandra Christie
- Music by: Gil Talmi
- Release date: November 2006 (IDFA Festival)
- Running time: 80 minutes

New Year Baby is a 2006 documentary film that tells the story of a family that survived the Cambodian genocide, and started a new life in the United States. The film was directed by Socheata Poeuv and produced by Charles Vogl. It won the 2007 IDFA "Movies That Matter" Award, an initiative of Amnesty International, as well as eight other international awards. It was aired on National PBS in 2008.

== Story synopsis ==
New Year Baby opens with a brief background story. The main character, Socheata, was born in a refugee camp in Thailand, where her family had fled following the Cambodian genocide. Her family left the refugee camp and emigrated to Texas, where they focused on creating a new life for themselves and their children.

The story moves to the present, when Socheata returns home for Christmas. Her mother calls a family meeting and reveals a secret that Socheata's entire family had kept from her: her two sisters are not actually her sisters, her brother is her half-brother, and her mother had a husband before Socheata's father. Socheata's family had been melded together in a Khmer Rouge labor camp, assembled from shards of an extended family that was shattered when family members were killed in the Cambodian genocide. After this secret is revealed, Socheata's mother and father invite Socheata and her brother to Cambodia, and Socheata agrees to go to discover what other secrets her family had left behind.

As Socheata spends time in Cambodia, more is gradually discovered about her family's past. Her two "sisters", Mala and Leakhena, are actually her cousins. They were taken to a Khmer Rouge labor camp, along with their mother and father. Their father was taken away when they arrived, and they never saw him again. Their mother died of starvation not long after, leaving them orphans, at which point Socheata's mother adopted them. Socheata's mother had a husband and son when she was taken to the labor camp. After her husband was killed, she continued to care for her son and Mala and Leakhena. She met Socheata's father in the Khmer Rouge labor camp, and they were married by a Khmer Rouge cadre.

The film continues with Socheata and her family traveling through Cambodia, visiting sites important to her family's history: the labor camp where her mother and father met, the spot where Mala and Leakhena's mother was buried, the homes of surviving relatives of both sides of her family.

The final chapter of the story reveals what happened after the Khmer Rouge fell and the Cambodian genocide ended. Although they were freed from the Khmer Rouge, Mala and Leakhena had been separated from their adopted parents. After searching for months Socheata's father found Mala and Leakhena, and smuggled the entire family through minefields and across the Thai-Cambodian border to the refugee camp where Socheata was born.

After visiting the spot where Socheata was born, Socheata and her father go to a Buddhist temple and complete the ritual for a new child that her father had been unable to complete in the refugee camp. The film concludes back in Texas, where Socheata brings out a wedding cake to celebrate the wedding ceremony that her parents had never been permitted to have, and her mother describes how proud and thankful she is for what Socheata's father had done to save their family and create a new life for them in America.

== Awards ==
- "Movies That Matter" Human Rights Award (an initiative of Amnesty International)
- Best Documentary, 25th Annual San Francisco International Asian American Film Festival
- Best Documentary, AFI Dallas International Film Festival
- Audience Award, Los Angeles VC Film Festival
- Special Jury Award, Asian American International Film Festival
- Audience Award, Asian American International Film Festival
- Crystal Heart Award, Heartland Film Festival
- Top 10 Audience Pick, International Documentary Festival Amsterdam (IDFA)
