= Roya TV =

Jordanian satellite TV channel

- Country: Jordan
- Broadcast area: Worldwide
- Headquarters: Jordan Media City, Amman, Jordan

Programming
- Language: Arabic
- Picture format: 1080i HDTV (downscaled to 576i for the SD feed, until 2024)

Ownership
- Owner: Sayegh Group

History
- Launched: 1 January 2011
- Founder: Fares Sayegh

Links
- Website: www.roya.tv

Availability

Streaming media
- Sling TV: Internet Protocol television

Roya TV (Arabic: رؤيا) is a Jordanian private independent satellite TV channel, based in Amman and owned by Sayegh Group. The channel was launched in 2011 broadcasting a mix of news, entertainment, drama, and lifestyle programs to Jordan and the wider Arab world.

== History and editorial policy ==
Roya TV was launched on January 1, 2011, as part of a broader expansion of private media in Jordan. The channel's stated mandate was to target families and youth, promote democracy, reach out to remote areas of the country, and create awareness on human rights and feminism in the Arab world.

Roya TV is strongly anti-Zionist and, unlike the Jordanian government, does not recognize the legitimacy of Israel. In written pieces, the network often puts Israel's name in scare quotes, or refers to the entire country as "occupied Palestine".

In December 2021, German broadcaster Deutsche Welle said it would be suspending its partnership with Roya TV over what it characterised as anti-Israel and antisemitic content by Roya TV on its social media platforms. Roya TV chief executive Fares Sayegh said in response that "criticism of illegal, inhumane or racist actions by Israel as a state" should be distinguished from antisemitism.

== Programming ==
Roya TV's general programming consists of four periods: morning, mid-day, afternoon, and evening; with a greater part of the content based on live shows. In 2012, Deema Hijjawi joined the Roya TV channel, to present a morning cookery program Dunya Ya Dunya.

== See also ==
- Rashed Rababah
