= List of Syrian civil war films =

Below is an incomplete list of feature films, television films or television series which include events of the Syrian civil war (2011-2024). This list does not include documentaries nor short films.

Writing for the BFI in 2017, Charlotte Bank noted that, until the 2000s, difficulties met by filmmakers in Syria led to "wish to address critical issues has often necessitated careful consideration of the means through which they speak" and that "Since the beginning of the current uprising-turned-war, they seem to have found this visual language. Sadly this has gone hand in hand with the large-scale destruction of the country and the necessity of life in exile for many artists and filmmakers, just as for ordinary Syrians." According to Enab Baladi, a number of Syrian films shot during the civil war tended to "obliterate the crimes" while addressing the topic.

== 2010s ==
Year	Country	Main title (Alternative title)	Original title (Original script)	Director	Subject
2013	Egypt	The Eastern Gate	باب شرقي	Ahmed Atef	Drama.
2013	Qatar; Lebanon; Syria	Ladder to Damascus	سلم إلى دمشق	Mohammad Malas	Drama, History, War.
2014	United States	Code Name: Caesar		Abdullah Alrachid	Biography, Drama. War crimes in the Syrian civil war
2015	Syria	Waiting for the Fall	بانتظار الخريف	Joud Saeed	Drama, War.
2015	Syria	Four O'clock at Paradise	الرابعة بتوقيت الفردوس	Mohamed Abdel Al-Aziz	Drama.
2015	Syria	The Mother	الأم	Basil Al-Khatib	Drama.
2015	India	Phantom		Kabir Khan	Action, Drama, Thriller.
2016	United States	Sniper: Ghost Shooter		Don Michael Paul	Action, Drama, Thriller, War.
2016	Syria	Aleppo Central Prison Siege (Ward off Fate)	رد القضاء	Najdat Anzour	Drama. Operation Canopus Star
2016	Syria	Me, You, Mother and Father	أنا وأنت وأمي وأبي	Abdellatif Abdelhamid	Drama.
2016	Italy; Morocco; United States	Watch Them Fall		Kristoph Tassin	Drama, Thriller.
2016	Syria	It is mortal and dissipates	فانية وتتبدد	Najdat Anzour	War. Islamic State
2016	Syria	The Syrians	سوريون	Basil Al-Khatib	Thriller.
2016	France; Belgium; Algeria	Road to Istanbul	La Route d'Istanbul	Rachid Bouchareb	Drama, Thriller. Islamic State
2016	Tunisia	The Flower of Aleppo	زهرة حلب; La Fleur d'Alep	Ridha Behi	Action, Drama, War. Al-Nusra Front
2016	France	Heaven Will Wait	Le Ciel attendra	Marie-Castille Mention-Schaar	Drama.
2017	Syria	The Father	الأب	Basil Al-Khatib	Drama. Islamic State
2017	Syria	Fires	حرائق	Mohamed Abdel Al-Aziz	War.
2017	Syria	Rain of Homs	مطر حمص	Joud Saeed	Drama. Siege of Homs
2017	Turkey	Bordo Bereliler: Suriye		Erhan Baytimur	Action, Drama, Thriller, War. Turkish involvement in the Syrian Civil War
2017	Belgium; France; Lebanon	Insyriated		Philippe Van Leeuw	Drama, War.
2018	France; Germany	Maya		Mia Hansen-Løve	Drama, Romance.
2018	Iran	Emperor of Hell	امپراطور جهنم	Parviz Sheikh Tadi	Drama.
2018	United States	To Be a Soldier		Adam Dufour	Action, Adventure, Drama, War. Islamic State
2018	United States; United Kingdom; Russia	Profile		Timur Bekmambetov	Mystery, Thriller. Islamic State
2018	Syria; France; Lebanon; Qatar	The Day I Lost My Shadow	يوم أضعت ظلّي	Soudade Kaadan	Drama.
2018	Syria	War Travelers	مسافرو الحرب; Le voyage inachevé	Joud Saeed	Battle of Aleppo (2012–2016)
2018	Syria	Syrian Lilith	ليليت السورية	Ghassan Shamit	Drama, War.
2018	Turkey	Bordo Bereliler 2: Afrin		Erhan Baytimur	Action, Thriller, War. Operation Olive Branch
2018	Syria	Damascus...Aleppo	دمشق - حلب	Basil Al-Khatib	Battle of Aleppo (2012–2016)
2018	France; Belgium; Georgia; Switzerland	Girls of the Sun	Les filles du soleil	Eva Husson	Drama, War. Women's Protection Units
2018	Iran	Damascus Time	به وقت شام	Ebrahim Hatamikia	Action, Drama, Thriller, War. Islamic State
2018	United Kingdom; United States	A Private War		Matthew Heineman	Biography, Drama, War. Based on the article Marie Colvin’s Private War. Marie Colvin
2018	Turkey	To Die For	Can Feda	Çağatay Tosun	Action, War. Turkish involvement in the Syrian Civil War
2019	Israel; United States	Jarhead: Law of Return		Don Michael Paul	Action, Drama, War.
2019	France; Italy; Belgium; Morocco	Sisters in Arms	Sœurs d'armes	Caroline Fourest	Action, Drama, War. Yazidi genocide
2019	Syria	Sky Road	درب السماء	Joud Saeed	
2019	Syria	Morning Star	نجمة الصبح	Joud Saeed	Drama, Romance, War.
2019	Tunisia; Morocco; Luxembourg; France	The Scarecrows	عرايس الخوف; Les Épouvantails	Nouri Bouzid	Drama.
2019	Syria; Spain; Iraq	The End Will Be Spectacular	Ji bo azadiyê	Ersin Çelik	War.
2019	Syria	Blood of the Palm Trees	دم النخل	Najdat Anzour	War, Drama. Khaled al-Asaad, Destruction of cultural heritage by the Islamic State, Palmyra offensive (May 2015)
2019	Syria	The Confession	الاعتراف	Basil Al-Khatib	Drama.
2019	Denmark; Norway; Sweden; Finland	Daniel	Ser du månen, Daniel	Niels Arden Oplev	Biography, Drama, War. Based on the book Ser du månen, Daniel. Daniel Rye
2019	France; Turkey	Escape from Raqqa	Exfiltrés	Emmanuel Hamon	Drama, Thriller. Islamic State

== 2020s ==
Year	Country	Main title (Alternative title)	Original title (Original script)	Director	Subject
2020	India	Baaghi 3		Ahmed Khan	Action, Adventure, Thriller.
2020	Turkey	Flashdrive	Flaşbellek	Derviş Zaim	Adventure, Drama, War. Islamic State
2020	Russia	Palmira	Пальмира	Ivan Bolotnikov	Drama.
2021	Syria; Germany; Palestine; Qatar	The Stranger	الغريب	Ameer Fakher Eldin	Drama.
2021	Syria	Dark Clouds	غيوم داكنة	Ayman Zeidan	Drama.
2021	Russia	Sky	Небо	Igor Kopylov	Action, Biography, Drama, War. Oleg Peshkov, 2015 Russian Sukhoi Su-24 shootdown
2021	Russia	Mama, I'm Home	Мама, я дома	Vladimir Bitokov	Drama. Russian intervention in the Syrian civil war
2021	Uzbekistan	I'm Not a Terrorist	Men terrorchi emasman Мен террорчи эмасман Я не террорист	Muhammad Ali Iskandarov	Action. Islamic State
2021	Lebanon; France	Broken Keys	مفاتيح مكسرة	Jimmy Keyrouz	Drama. Islamic State
2021	Uzbekistan	Captivity	Tutqunlik; Туткинлик; Неволя	Rashid Malikov	Islamic State
2022	Belgium; Luxembourg; France	Rebel		Adil El Arbi and Bilall Fallah	Action, Drama, Thriller. Islamic State
2022	Syria	The wedding parade	Berbû	Sevinaz Evdike	Drama.
2022	Syria	Joseph's Journey	رحلة يوسف	Joud Saeed	
2022	Syria; United Kingdom; France; Qatar	Nezouh	نزوح	Soudade Kaadan	Drama, War.
2022	Russia	Palmira	Пальмира	Andrei Kravchuk	Drama, War. Palmyra offensive (March 2016)
2022	Russia	Infiltration	Своя война. Шторм в пустыне	Aleksey Chadov	Drama, History, Thriller, War.
2022	Syria	Kobanê		Özlem Yasar	War. Siege of Kobanî, Women's Protection Units
2023	India	Akelli		Pranay Meshram	Drama, Thriller.
2023	Syria	The wise	الحكيم	Basil Al-Khatib	
2024	Syria	Two days	يومين	Basil Al-Khatib	
2024	Syria	Day Zero	اليوم صفر	Majid Alkhatib	
2024	Syria	Life	حياة	Basil Al-Khatib	
2024	France; Germany; Belgium	Rabia		Mareike Engelhardt	Drama. Islamic State
2024	Spain; Morocco	Raqqa: Spy vs. Spy	Raqa	Gerardo Herrero	Action, Adventure, Thriller. Based on a novel Vírgenes y verdugos.
2024	Jordan; Occupied Palestinian Territory; United States	I Was a Stranger		Brandt Andersen	Drama.
2025	United Kingdom	Brides		Nadia Fall	Drama. Bethnal Green trio

== Science fiction, fantasy, and horror ==
Year	Country	Main title (Alternative titles)	Original title (Original script)	Director	Battles, campaigns, events depicted
2017	Syria	Man and Three Days	رجل وثلاثة أيام	Joud Saeed	Comedy, Drama, Fantasy.

== Television films ==
Year	Country	Main title (Alternative title)	Original title (Original script)	Director	Subject
2022	Russia	Syrian Sonata	Сирийская соната	Oleg Pogodin	Drama, Romance, War. Russian intervention in the Syrian civil war

== Television series ==
Year	Country	Main title (Alternative title)	Original title (Original script)	Director	Subject
2011-2020	United States	Homeland			Crime, Drama, Mystery, Thriller.
2011-13	Syria	Born from the Flank: Wilada Min Alkhasira	الولادة من الخاصرة	Rasha Shurbatji; Seif Eddin Subaie	Action, Crime, Drama, Thriller.
2013	Syria	Under the Home Country's Sky	تحت سماء الوطن	Najdat Anzour	Drama.
2014-18	Israel	My Affair with ISIS	הרומן שלי עם דאעש	Dima Konoplov	Comedy.
2014	Syria	Red Lipstick	قلم حمرة	Hatem Ali	Drama, Romance, War.
2014	Syria	The Bags	ضبو الشناتي	Allaith Hajjo	Comedy, Drama.
2014	Syria	A Family from our time	عائلة من هذا الزمان	Najdat Anzour	
2015	Syria	Intensive Care	عناية مشددة	Ahmed Ibrahim Ahmed	Drama.
2015	Syria	Woman of Ashes	امرأة من رماد	Najdat Anzour	Drama.
2015-20	France	The Bureau	Le Bureau des Légendes		Drama, Thriller. Directorate-General for External Security
2016	Syria	Without sheath	بلا غمد	Fahd Miri	Drama, War.
2016	Syria	Demise	زوال	Ahmed Ibrahim Ahmed	Drama.
2016	Syria	Regret	الندم	Allaith Hajjo	Drama, Romance, War. Based on a novel Pain threshold.
2016	Syria	Red	أحمر	Joud Saeed	Thriller.
2016/20	Israel	Charlie Golf One	תאג"ד	Zion Rubin	Drama. Israel and the Syrian civil war
2017	United Kingdom	The State		Peter Kosminsky	Drama, Thriller. Islamic State
2017	Syria	Family Crisis	أزمة عائلية	Hisham Sharbatji	Comedy, Drama, Family.
2017	Saudi Arabia; Syria; Egypt; Lebanon; Kuwait	Black Crows	غرابيب سود	Hussam Alrantisi; Adel Adeeb; Hussein Shawkat	Drama, Thriller, War. Islamic State
2017	Syria	Desire	شوق	Rasha Shurbatji	Drama, Romance.
2018	Turkey	Wolf	Börü	Can Emre; Cem Özüduru	Action, Thriller, War.
2018	Russia	On the Edge	На краю	Evgeniy Lavrentev	Drama.
2018	Belarus; Russia	Black dog	Чёрный пёс	Vladimir Yankovskiy; Alexander Franskevich-Leie	Action, Drama.
2018-23	United States	Jack Ryan			Action, Crime, Drama, Thriller.
2019	Syria	Masafet Aman: Safe Distance	مسافة أمان	Allaith Hajjo	Drama, War.
2019	Syria	Interpretations of Yearning	ترجمان الأشواق	Mohamed Abdel Al-Aziz	
2020	France; Israel; Belgium		No Man's Land		Drama, Thriller, War. Women's Protection Units
2020	Kazakhstan	Confrontation	Противостояние	Madina Alimkhan	
2020	Sweden	Caliphate	Kalifat	Goran Kapetanović	Crime, Drama, Thriller. Bethnal Green trio, Islamic State
2021	Syria	On a Hot Tin Roof	على صفيح ساخن	Seif Eddin Subaie	Action.
2021	Syria	Because It's My Country	لأنها بلادي	Najdat Anzour	
2021	Denmark	Outlaw	Fredløs	Laurits Flensted-Jensen	Crime, Drama.
2023	Lebanon	Fire on Fire	النار بالنار	Mohamed Abdel Al-Aziz	Drama, Thriller.
2023	Iran	Habib	حبیب	Joud Saeed	Iranian intervention in the Syrian civil war
2023	United Kingdom; France	Liaison		Stephen Hopkins	Drama, Thriller.
2023	Russia	Save the Only Son	Спасти единственного сына	Nikolay Khomeriki	Drama, Thriller.
2023	India	The Freelancer		Bhav Dhulia	Action, Thriller. Islamic State
2024	Russia	Eye of the Desert	Глаз пустыни	Aleksei Alferov	Action, Drama, War.
2024	Kuwait	Cargo	مال القبان	Seif Eddin Subaie	Drama.
2024	United States	The Veil			Thriller.
2026	Russia	Hostage	Заложник	Sergey Popov	Action, Drama.

== Refugees ==
=== Films ===
Year	Country	Main title (Alternative titles)	Original title (Original script)	Director	Battles, campaigns, events depicted
2013	Italy	Border		Alessio Cremonini	Drama.
2014	Bulgaria; Germany; Croatia	The Judgment	Съдилището	Stephan Komandarev	Drama.
2015	Germany	After Spring Comes Fall	Kafkanistan	Daniel Carsenty	Drama, Thriller, War.
2015	Greece	Worlds Apart	Ένας άλλος κόσμος	Christoforos Papakaliatis	Drama, Romance.
2016	Austria; Bosnia and Herzegovina; Croatia; Serbia	The Final Barrier		Jasmin Duraković	Drama.
2016	Greece; United Kingdom; Germany	Amerika Square	Πλατεία Αμερικής	Yannis Sakaridis	Drama.
2017	Bosnia and Herzegovina; Turkey	Never Leave Me		Aida Begić	Drama.
2017	United Kingdom	A Moment in the Reeds		Mikko Mäkelä	Drama, Romance.
2017	Turkey	The Guest Aleppo to Istanbul		Andaç Haznedaroglu	Drama.
2017	Finland; Germany	The Other Side of Hope	Toivon tuolla puolen	Aki Kaurismäki	Comedy, Drama.
2018	Turkey; Germany; Romania	Saf		Ali Vatansever	Drama.
2018	Lebanon; United States; France; Cyprus; Qatar; United Kingdom	Capernaum	كفرناحوم	Nadine Labaki	Drama.
2019	Turkey; United States; France	Scent of My Daughter	Kızım Gibi Kokuyorsun	Olgun Özdemir	Drama.
2019	Germany	Label Me		Kai Kreuser	Drama.
2019	United Kingdom; United States	Greed		Michael Winterbottom	Comedy, Drama.
2020	United Kingdom	Limbo		Ben Sharrock	Comedy, Drama.
2020	Tunisia; France; Belgium; Germany; Sweden; Qatar; Cyprus; Turkey	The Man Who Sold His Skin	الرجل الذي باع ظهره	Kaouther Ben Hania	Drama.
2020	Lithuania	The Lawyer	Advokatas	Romas Zabarauskas	Drama, Romance.
2021	Canada	Peace by Chocolate		Jonathan Keijser	Comedy, Drama. Peace by Chocolate
2022	Turkey	Aylan Baby		Omer Sarikaya	Action, Crime, Drama. Death of Alan Kurdi
2022	United Kingdom; United States	The Swimmers		Sally El Hosaini	Biography, Drama, Sport. Yusra Mardini, Sarah Mardini
2023	Poland; United States; Czech Republic; France; Belgium; Germany; Turkey	Green Border	Zielona granica	Agnieszka Holland	Drama. Belarus–European Union border crisis
2023	United Kingdom; France; Belgium	The Old Oak		Ken Loach	Drama.
2023	Canada; Lebanon	Valley of Exile	وادي المنفى	Anna Fahr	Drama.
2024	France; Belgium; Germany	Ghost Trail	Les Fantômes	Jonathan Millet	Drama, Thriller.
2025	Germany; Canada; Italy; Occupied Palestinian Territory; Qatar; Jordan	Yunan	يونان	Ameer Fakher Eldin	Drama.

=== Science fiction, fantasy, and horror ===
Year	Country	Main title (Alternative titles)	Original title (Original script)	Director	Battles, campaigns, events depicted
2017	Hungary; Germany; France	Jupiter's Moon	Jupiter holdja	Kornél Mundruczó	Drama, Fantasy, Mystery, Sci-Fi, Thriller.
2021	United States; Canada	Lamya's Poem		Alex Kronemer	Animation, Adventure, Family, Fantasy.

=== Television films ===
Year	Country	Main title (Alternative titles)	Original title (Original script)	Director	Battles, campaigns, events depicted
2018	Netherlands	Just Friends	Gewoon Vrienden	Ellen Smit	Comedy, Drama, Romance.

=== Television series ===
Year	Country	Main title (Alternative titles)	Original title (Original script)	Director	Battles, campaigns, events depicted
2013	Syria	We Will Be Right Back	سنعود بعد قليل	Allaith Hajjo	Drama.
2015	Syria; United Arab Emirates	Tomorrow's Hope	غدا نلتقي	Rami Hanna	Drama.
2019	Brazil	Orphans of a Nation	Órfãos da Terra	André Câmara	Drama, Romance.
2019	United Arab Emirates; Jordan	Passage	عبور	Mohammed Hushki	Drama. Mrajeeb Al Fhood refugee camp
2019	Germany		Eden	Dominik Moll	Drama.
2019-20	United Kingdom	Home		David Sant	Comedy, Drama.
2020-24	Canada	Transplant			Drama.
