= Agent Hamilton =

Agent Hamilton may refer to:

- the fictional character of Swedish secret agent Carl Hamilton, who features in film and television adaptations including:
  - Agent Hamilton: But Not If It Concerns Your Daughter (Swedish title: Hamilton 2: Men inte om det gäller din dotter), 2012
  - Agent Hamilton: In Her Majesty's Service (Hamilton 3: I hennes majestäts tjänst), 2016; see Carl Hamilton novels § Film and TV adaptations
  - Agent Hamilton (TV series) (Hamilton), 2020
