= Fethi Haddaoui =

Tunisian actor, director, writer and producer (1961–2024)

- فتحي الهداوي
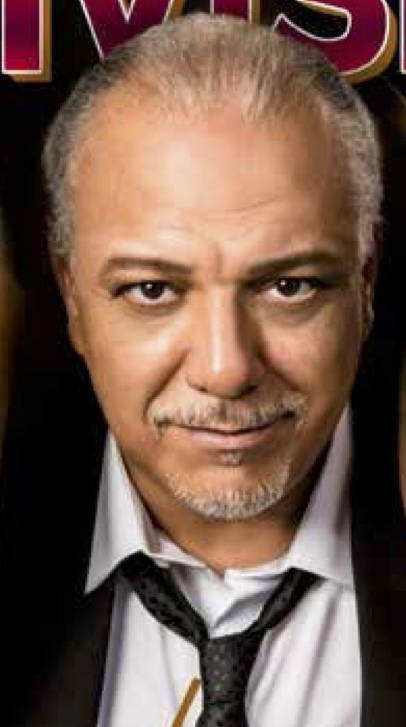
- Fethi Haddaoui in the Tunisian Magazine Tunivisions’s cover No.130 Issue
- Born: 9 December 1961; Tunis, Tunisia
- Died: 12 December 2024 (aged 63); Tunis, Tunisia
- Resting place: Sidi Salah Cemetery, Le Bardo, Tunis, Tunisia
- Education: Higher Institute of Dramatic Arts, Tunis University
- Occupation: Actor
- Years active: 1984–2024
- Known for: Halfaouine: Boy of The Terraces; Sayd Errim; For the Beautiful Eyes of Catherine
- Spouse: Razam Hijazi (m. 2004)
- Children: 2

Fethi Haddaoui (9 December 1961 – 12 December 2024) was a Tunisian actor, director, writer and producer.

== Early life ==
Fethi Haddaoui was born in Tunis, Tunisia in 1961. He is originally from Thala.

== Career ==
Fethi Haddaoui was the main actor in several plays, including Arab and El Aouada. He was also a television personality thanks to his participation in several soap operas and series, in Tunisia, Syria, Jordan, Morocco, Turkey, the United Arab Emirates, Lebanon, Italy and France. In cinema, he played in several European films under the direction of directors like Franco Rossi, Serge Moati, Jean Sagols Peter Kassovitz and others.

Haddaoui won numerous awards during his career, including Best Supporting Actor for his role in No Man's Love and Noce d'été at the Carthage Film Festival, best male interpretation at the Oran International Arabic Film Festival, best director at the Festival des radios and Arab televisions for La Cité du savoir.

== Personal life and death ==
Haddaoui was married to the Syrian Razam Hijazi and had two children together, a boy named Adam, and a daughter, Jamila.

=== Death ===
Haddaoui died on 12 December 2024, at the age of 63.

== Filmography ==
=== Films ===
==== Long films ====
- 1985: La Coupe by Mohamed Damak
- 1986: Le Mystère by Franco Rossi
- 1987: Un bambino di nome Gesù (it) by Franco Rossi
- 1988: Les Sabots en or by Nouri Bouzid
- 1988: L'Attente by Franco Rossi
- 1998: Arab by Fadhel Jaïbi et Fadhel Jaziri
- 1989: L'Été de tous les chagrins by Serge Moati
- 1990: Halfaouine Child of the Terraces by Férid Boughedir
- 1992: Poussière de diamants (Chich Khan) by Mahmoud Ben Mahmoud and Fadhel Jaïbi
- 1994: Des feux mal éteints by Serge Moati
- 1996: Des héros ordinaires by Peter Kassovitz
- 1998: No Man's Love by Nidhal Chatta
- 2000: Clé de sol by Chawki Mejri
- 2001: The 3 Kings by Allain Mosly
- 2002: The Assassinated Sun by Abdelkrim Bahloul
- 2004: Noce d'été by Mokhtar Ladjimi
- 2006: Les Ombres du silence by Abdullah al-Moheissen
- 2009: Cinecittà by Ibrahim Letaïef
- 2012: Jeudi après-midi by Mohamed Damak
- 2012: Bab El Falla by Moslah Kraïem
- 2019: Papillon d'or by Abdelhamid Bouchnak

==== Short films ====
- 1992: Un certain regard by Khaled Barsaoui
- 1997: Clé de sol by Chawki Mejri
- 1998: Kelibia Mazzara by Jean Franco Pannone and Tarek Ben Abdallah
- 2011: Sauve qui peut by Fethi Doghri
- 2013: N'importe quoi by Ismahane Lahmar
- 2013: Peau de colle by Kaouther Ben Hania

=== Television ===
- 1992: Liyam Kif Errih by Slaheddine Essid
- 1993: Between the Lines by J. C. Wilsher
- 1993: La Tempête by Abdelkader Jerbi
- 1994: Ghada by Mohamed Hadj Slimane as Afif
- 1995: La Moisson by Abdelkader Jerbi
- 1997: Tej Min Chouk by Chawki Mejri as Saaïda
- 1999: Al Toubi by Basil Al-Khatib
- 2002: Holako by Basil Al-Khatib
- 2002: Gamret Sidi Mahrous by Slaheddine Essid as: Mahmoud Saber
- 2003: Al Hajjaj by Mohamed Azizia
- 2004: Abou Zid Al-Hilali by Basil Al-Khatib
- 2005: La Dernière rose by Fardous Attassi
- 2005: Al Murabitun Wa Al Andalus by Nagi Teameh
- 2006: Khalid ibn al-Walid by Mohamed Azizia as Malek Ibn Awf
- 2008: Sayd Errim by Ali Mansour as Raîf
- 2010: Casting by Sami Fehri
- 2010: Al-Hassan wa Al-Hussain by Abdul Bari Abu El-Kheir
- 2011: L'Infiltré by Giacomo Battiato
- 2012: For the Beautiful Eyes of Catherine by Hamadi Arafa
- 2012: Omar (2012) - as Abu Sufyan by Hatem Ali
- 2013: Diary Of A Woman by Mourad Ben Cheikh : Ali
- 2013: Layem by Khaled Barsaoui
- 2013: The Fifth Wife by Habib Mselmani and Jamel Eddine Khelif (Guest of honor of episodes 3, 4, 5, 11 and 15) : Faruk
- 2014–2015: Naouret El Hawa by Madih Belaïd
- 2015: School (episode 1) by Rania Gabsi
- 2015: Bolice (episode 3 and 4) by Majdi Smiri
- 2016: Le Président by Jamil Najjar
- 2017: Lemnara by Atef Ben Hassine
- 2017: The Imam by Abdul Bari Abu El-Kheir
- 2019: El Maestro by Lassaad Oueslati
- 2019: Kingdoms of Fire by Peter Webber
- 2019–2020: Sons of Moufida by Sami Fehri et Saoussen Jemni (seasons 4 and 5) as Boubaker Ouerghi
- 2020: Nouba (season 2) by Abdelhamid Bouchnak as Ridha Dandy
- 2020: Galb Edhib by Bassem Hamraoui
- 2021: Awled El Ghoul by Mourad Ben Cheikh as Mr Ismael El Ghoul
- 2022: Baraa by Mourad Ben Cheikh as Wannès

=== Theater ===
- 1982: Doulab by Habib Chebil (Tunisia)
- 1984: Mawal by Habib Chebil (Tunisia)
- 1987: Arab by Fadhel Jaïbi and Fadhel Jaziri (Tunisia)
- 1989: El Aouada by Fadhel Jaïbi and Fadhel Jaziri (Tunisia)
- 2000: Il Corano by Arbi Chérif (Italy)
- 2003: Œdipe by Sotigui Kouyaté (France)
- 2011: Lecture croisée with Fanny Ardant (Tunisia)
- 2012: Lecture croisée with Carole Bouquet (Tunisia)
- 2013: Lecture (Tunisia)
- 2014: Lecture (France)
- 2017: Promesse Factory (France)

=== Videos ===
- 2014–2015: advertising spots for the Tunisian brand of harissa and tomato paste Sicam

=== Awards and nominations ===
- 1979: Award for best male performance for his role in I swore the victory of the sun at the National Festival of School Theater, Ibn Charaf high school;
- 1980: Award for the best male interpretation for his role in Nazeem Hikmet at the National Festival of School Theater Ibn Charaf high school;
- 2000:
  - Best Supporting Actor for his role in No Man's Love in Carthage Film Festival;
  - Best Male Interpretation at the Oran International Arabic Film Festival;
- 2004: Best Supporting Actor for his role in Summer Wedding in Carthage Film Festival ;
- 2010: Best Director at the Arab Radio and Television Festival for La Cité du savoir;
- 2013:
  - Best actor at the Oran International Arabic Film Festival;
  - Best actor and Ramadan star prize at the Romdhane Awards, awarded by Mosaïque FM;
- 2014: Best actor at the Romdhane Awards for his role in Naouret El Hawa;
- 2019:
  - Best Actor at the Romdhane Awards;
  - Best popular Tunisian actor for his role in El Maestro by Sayidaty Magazine
- 2020:
  - Best Actor at the Romdhane Awards;
  - Best Tunisian actor by Tunivisions;
  - Best Popular Tunisian Actor by Sayidaty Magazine;
  - Best Maghreb Actor by ET bel Arabi.

=== Honours ===
- 2010 : Knight of the National Order of Merit of Tunisia.
