= FIFAO =

FIFAO may refer to:

- Fouilles de l'Institut français d'archéologie orientale, a publication of the Institut Français d'Archéologie Orientale
- Oran International Arabic Film Festival, or the Festival international du film arabe d'Oran
