= Hamilton: In the Interest of the Nation =

- Directed by: Kathrine Windfeld
- Written by: Hans Gunnarsson; Stefan Jaworski; Stefan Thunberg
- Based on: I nationens intresse by Jan Guillou
- Produced by: Jan Marnell
- Starring: Mikael Persbrandt; Pernilla August; Jason Flemyng; David Dencik; Saba Mubarak
- Cinematography: Jonas Alarik
- Edited by: Sofia Lindgren
- Music by: Philippe Boix-Vives; Jon Ekstrand
- Distributed by: Buena Vista International (Sweden); SF International Sales (International)
- Release date: January 13, 2012
- Running time: 109 minutes
- Country: Sweden
- Languages: Swedish; English

Hamilton: In the Interest of the Nation is a 2012 spy film directed by Danish director Kathrine Windfeld. The film was supported by the Swedish Film Institute. It is the first part of a planned trilogy. Hamilton: In the Interest of the Nation preceded Agent Hamilton: But Not If It Concerns Your Daughter.

== Plot ==
Carl Hamilton is a Commander in the Swedish Foreign Intelligence Service. The film opens in Stockholm with Hamilton and his Polish girlfriend in bed together in her flat. Then Hamilton is sent on an assignment in Central Asia to infiltrate and monitor an international gang of smugglers and arms dealers who are about to sell Swedish made weapons (GPS guided artillery shells) to terrorists. Hamilton's life depends on making the criminals at all times believe he is a Russian. When the arms dealers and the terrorists meet, the whole transaction goes haywire and Hamilton has to kill and run. Being on his own, he cannot retrieve the munitions. Back in Sweden he is berated by a new superior. He returns to his girlfriend (after a four-month unexplained absence) and admits he wants to quit his job. They renew their relationship but she is a doctor and has to leave him in the middle of the night because of an emergency. He falls into sleep, recalling in his dream how he had to kill at close range during his recent mission. When his girlfriend returns and touches him while his nightmare peaks, he reacts as if he is still amongst enemies. Before he can even open his eyes he carries out a trained reflex and kills her. Obviously shocked and dismayed he fakes a break-in and struggle before leaving her flat. He blames his mentor DG for having turned him into a killing machine. DG persuades him not to give himself up to the police and sends him abroad to rescue a Swedish technician who seems to be involved in the matter of the smuggled Swedish GPS guided munitions. But a US-based corporation operating mercenaries named Sectragon plans to kindle a new war as a profitable business opportunity. The mercenaries even attempt to assassinate a foreign head of state in Sweden. With the assistance of PLO operative Mouna al Fathar, with whom Hamilton has a close (potentially romantic) relationship, he prevents the assassination. Finally he visits the police officer who has been investigating the death of his girlfriend. He admits his guilt and remorse but also tells her to drop the case. Hamilton must keep on doing his job because it is just... In the interest of the nation...

== Cast ==
- Mikael Persbrandt as Carl Hamilton
- Pernilla August as Swedish Prime Minister Sara Landhag
- Saba Mubarak as Mouna al Fathar
- Jason Flemyng as Rob Hart
- Lennart Hjulström as DG (Den Gamle), Hamilton's superior and mentor
- Peter Andersson as Director of Swedish Military Intelligence and Security Service
- David Dencik as Deputy Prime Minister of Sweden
- Ray Fearon as Benjamin Lee
- Gustaf Hammarsten as Martin Lagerbäck
- Leo Gregory as Miller, Sectragon
- Liv Mjönes as Johanna Runestam, police inspector
- Fanny Risberg as Maria Solska
- Kevin McNally as Harold Smith

== Production ==
While filming in Jordan the film crew employed about 80 local contributors. The Swedish Embassy pointed out The Royal Film Commission had been very helpful during pre-production and shooting of Hamilton: In the Interest of the Nation. Sweden's diplomatic mission screened the film on the National Day of Sweden 2013 at the Al-Hussein Cultural Center in Amman as proof for the "close cultural cooperation between Sweden and Jordan". The film's executive producer Johan Mardell explained to The Jordan Times a great deal of the film had been shot in Jordan, including parts of the story when the action seems to take place in Eritrea or Somalia. He expressed how greatly he'd appreciated the local support.

== Reception ==
In January 2012 "Hamilton: In the Interest of the Nation" was Sweden's "No 1 blockbuster". Consequently, by the end of January 2012 SF International Sales had already been able to sell it to more than ten foreign markets. At the end of the year it was due to 512,661 admissions recognised as the most successful Swedish film in his home country in 2012. On the occasion of this film adaptation Carl Hamilton was compared to James Bond. Reviews were mostly positive.

== DVD release ==
A short "making-of" in English does exist and can be found (with German subtitles) on the German DVD version. However, not all DVD versions for English-speaking buyers include it.
