= List of Jordanian actors =

This is a list of Jordanian actors.

== List ==
=== Male actors ===
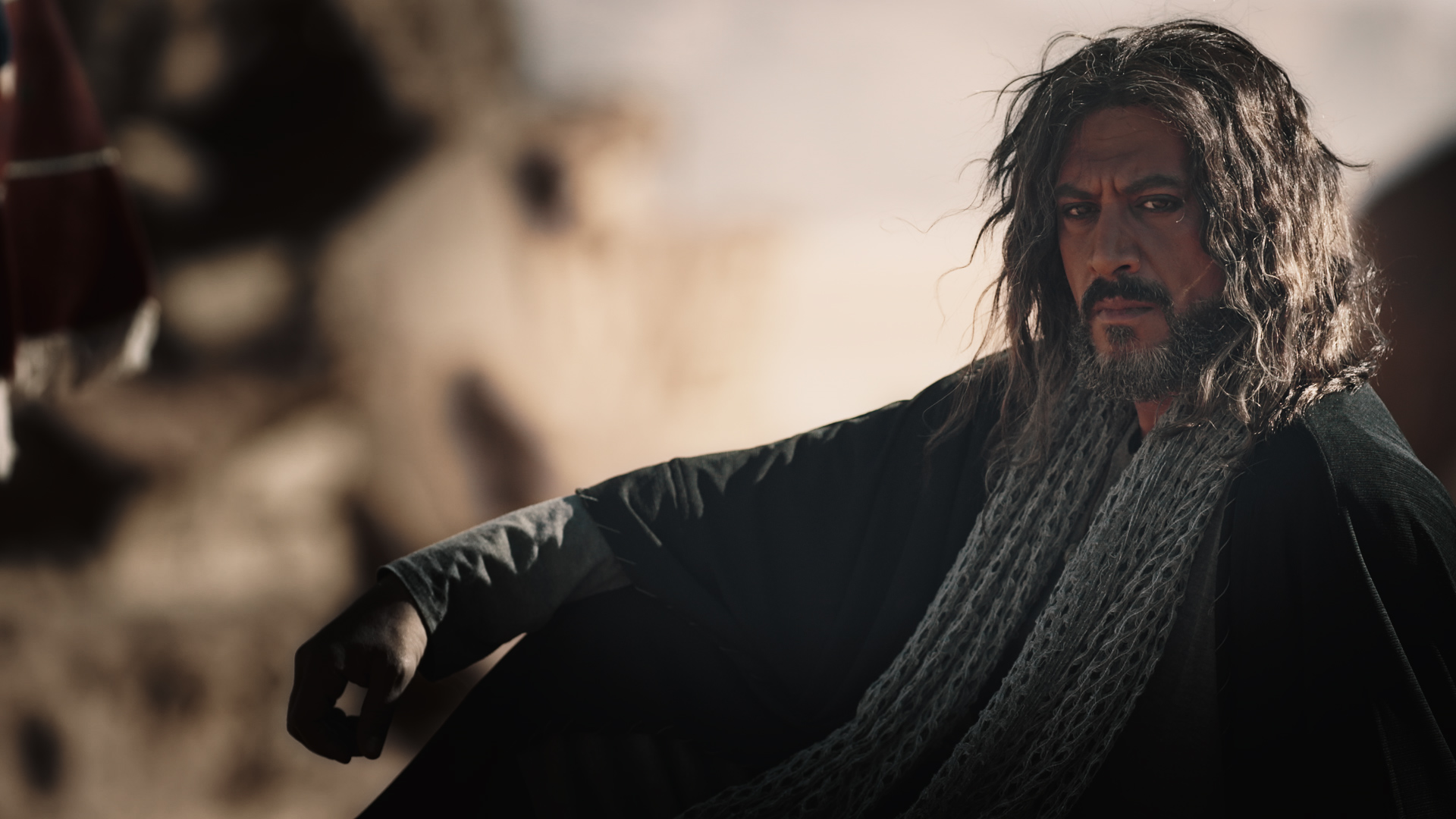
The late Jordanian actor Yasser Al-Masri, a picture of the series Malik bin Rrib

- Mondher Rayahneh (born 8 April 1979 in Irbid)
- Yasser Al-Masri (22 November 1970 – 23 August 2018)
- Nadim Sawalha (born 9 September 1935)
- Nabil Sawalha
- Abdulrahman Thaher (born December 31, 1982 in UAE)
- Eyad Nassar (born 1971 in Riyadh)

=== Actresses ===
- Juliet Awwad (born July 7, 1951 in Amman, Jordan)
- Margo Haddad (born February 26, 1988)
- Mais Hamdan (born October 31, 1982)
- Abeer Issa (born 25 April 1961)
- Saba Mubarak (born April 10, 1976 in Anjara)
- Noor Taher (born November 2, 1999 in Amman, Jordan)
- Tara Abboud (born 2001, in Amman, Jordan)
- Rakeen Saad (born December 16, 1989 in Amman, Jordan)

== See also ==
- Cinema of Jordan
