= Bassem Yakhour =

Syrian actor, writer and director (born 1971)

- Born: Bassem Yakhour; August 16, 1971 (age 55); Latakia, Syria
- Education: Higher Institute of Dramatic Arts
- Occupations: Actor; writer; director
- Years active: 1993–present
- Website: bassemyakhour.com

Bassem Yakhour (Arabic: باسم ياخور; born August 16, 1971) is a Syrian actor, writer and director.

== Career ==
Born in Latakia to a Greek Orthodox family, Bassem Yakhour graduated from the Higher Institute of Dramatic Arts in 1993 and joined the Syrian Artists Syndicate on February 16, 1999. Since 1993, Yakhour has acted in many television series, stage productions, and theater. He was also a television presenter for a short time for a show called "Charisma". He also directed a series in 2004 and a play in 2000.

Today, he is known for the Spotlight series, for which he co-writes and acts. The latter was an important contribution to Syrian art, although critics were very harsh.

== Selected filmography ==
=== Cinema ===
| Year | Name | Role played | Description |
|---|---|---|---|
| 1993 | The Storm | Actor | — |

=== Series ===
- 1994 – Five-Star Family, actor, television series for Al-Sham Arts production, in which he gained tremendous popularity, next to Ayman Ridah, in which he keeps in touch in his career
- 1994 – Al-Thuraya, actor, historical series for Bosra for Art
- 1995 – The Bird, actor, television series for Arab international productions
- 1996 – The Handcuff, actor, drama series for Arab international productions
- 1997 – Seven Stars Family, actor, television series for Al-Sham Arts
- 1998 – Brothers of Dust, actor, drama series for Al-Sham Arts
- 1999 – Hero of His Time, actor, comedy series for Al-Sham Arts production
- 2000 – Spotlight, Part 1, actor, co-writer, television series for Syria for Arts production
- 2001 – Spotlight, Part 2, actor, co-writer, television series for Syria for Arts production
- 2001 – Salahiddin, actor, historical series for Syria for Arts production
- 2002 – Spotlight, Part 3, actor, co-writer, television series for Syria for Arts production
- 2002 – Saqr Quraysh, actor, historical series for Syria for Arts production
- 2003 – Spring of Cordoba, actor, historical series for Syria for Arts production
- 2004 – Homy Hon, actor and director, series for Al-Sham Arts production
- 2004 – Spotlight, Part 4, actor and co-writer for Syria for Arts production
- 2004 – Hasna, special appearance in Ali Deek's video clip
- 2005 – Arabiyat 2005, actor and co-writer (announced)
- 2005 – Khalf Elkudban, actor, drama series written by Habi Elsa3di, directed by Allith Hajjo
- 2006 – Khalid ibn al-Walid, actor, historical series written by Abd Elkareem Nasif, directed by Mohammad Azizieh
- 2007 – Fajroun Akhar, actor, a drama series written by Fadi Koshukji, directed by Firas Dhni
- 2007 – Jarima Bila Nihaya, actor, a detective series written by Tarek Brnjkji and directed by Nabil Shams
- 2007 – Wasmet 3ar, actor, a drama series written by Dr. Fathalla Oumar, directed by Naji Toumeh
- 2007 – Egyptian film Khalij Nema, actor, written by Ahmad Al Beh, and directed by Majdi al Hawari
- 2008 – Jar Al Rida, actor, a comedy series written by Dr. Mamdouh Hamada, directed by Allaith Hajjo
- 2008 – Alkhat Alahmar, actor, a drama series written by Hani Elsa3di, directed by Yousef Rezek
- 2008 – Egyptian political series Zel Almuhareb, actor, written by Basheer Eldeek, directed by Nader Galal
- 2009 – Qa'a Al-madinah, actor, directed by Sameer Hussien
- 2010 – Zohra wa Azwagha El Khamssa, actor, directed by Mohamed El Nokaly
- 2011 – Taab El Mishwar, actor, directed by Seif Al Deen Sbei'i
- 2011–2013 – Born from the Flank: Wilada Min Alkhasira, three consecutive series, each 30 episodes, actor, directed by Rasha Sharbatji for 2011 and 2012 series, and Seif El-Dinne Al Soubai for 2013 series
- 2012 – Al Khorba, actor, directed by Al Laith Hajo
- 2014–2015 – Alekhwa, actor, co-directed by Saif Shaikh Najib and Seif El-Dinne Al Soubai
- 2015 – Elakat Khassa, actor, directed by Rasha Sharbatji
- 2015 – Al-Arrab 1, actor, co-directed by Nashaat Al-Melhem and Hatem Ali
- 2016 – Al Arrab 2: Taht Al Hezam, actor, directed by Hatem Ali
- 2016 – Al Nadam, actor, directed by Allaith Hajo
- 2016–2017 – School of Love a.k.a. Madraset Al Hob, actor, directed by Safwan Naomo
- 2017 – Mudhakarat Eashiqat Sabiqa, actor, directed by Hesham Sharbatji
- 2017 – Al Shakikatan, actor, directed by Maya Wansa, Samir Habchi and Salem Al-Hadchiti
- 2018 – Al Waq-waq, actor, directed by Al Laith Hajo
- 2019 – Haramlek, actor, directed by Tamer Isaak
- 2019 – Sayko, actor, directed by Raymond Abu Eita, Mudar Ibrahim, Alaa Moura Lee and Kinan Sednawe
- 2020 – Ahla Ayam, actor, directed by Saif Shaikh Najib
- 2021 – Tuesday 12, actor, directed by Majdi Smiri and Jaimin Bal
- 2021 – The Platform 2/3, actor, directed by Yasser Samy
- 2021 – Ala Safeeh Sakhen, actor, directed by Maxim Mansour, Saiful Din Subayie and Seif Al Deen Sbei'i
- 2023 – Laylat Alsuqut, actor, directed by Abdullah Shuaib
- 2023 – Al Arbaji, actor, directed by Wael Abo-Shaar and Seif Al Deen Sbei'i
- 2023 – Khareef Omar, directed by Muthanna Sobh
- 2024 – The Board, actor, directed by Hozan Akko
- 2024 – Al Arbaji: Fire from the Womb of Injustice - Part 2, actor, directed by Seif Al Deen Sbei'i

=== Other appearances ===
- 2001– Mabash Ana, special appearance in Asalah Nasri's video clip.

== Threat to life ==
On 25 May 2025, Burkan al-Furat group threatened Bassem Yakhour and giving him 48 hours to leave the country for supporting Ba'athist Syria.
