= Hanan Al-Agha =

Palestinian plastic artist and writer (1948–2008)

Hanan Al-Agha حنان الأغا
- Born: 1948; Jaffa, Mandatory Palestine
- Died: 19 April 2008 (aged 59–60); Amman, Jordan
- Spouse: Ahmed Mubarak

Hanan Al-Agha (Arabic: حنان الأغا; 1948–19 April 2008) was a Palestinian-Jordanian writer, poet and plastic artist. She worked and exhibited in many Arab countries, and many of her works are still displayed in online forums. She also worked at the Jordan Ministry of Education until her retirement. Her daughter is the Jordanian actress and producer Saba Mubarak.

== Biography ==
Al-Agha was born in Jaffa in 1948. She obtained a bachelor's degree in arts and education from Cairo University in 1970. Later, she attended art courses at the Jordanian Ministry of Education and the Queen Alia Fund.

She began exhibiting in group exhibitions in Cairo along with other women artists, and then moved to Amman, Jordan, in 1972, where she held a joint exhibition with the Jordanian artist Arwa Tal, which received positive reviews. She went on to solo exhibitions in Cairo, Amman, and Baghdad, and many more international group exhibitions.

She married a Jordanian from Ajloun, Ahmed Mubarak, with whom she had two children: Saba Mubarak and Aya Wuhoush.

She headed the Art Education Division of the Directorate General of Curriculum and Educational Technologies at the Ministry of Education.

In addition to her own work in art and literature, Al-Agha authored many books on traditional art and crafts, and was widely published in the local and international Arabic newspapers.

=== Additional activities and associations ===
She taught art education in schools and community colleges and lectured in several technical courses in the Ministry of Education and the Queen Alia Fund. She was a member of the Association of Fine Artists in Jordan, the Association of Fine Artists in Palestine, and the Committee on Inventory of Color Labels in the Arabic Language Academy in Jordan, 1987. She was also in various art education development teams.

== Art ==
In her work, Al-Agha used assertive colors, and composition -- in which figures of people move about -- to endow the plastic medium with a dimension of time. Her brush strokes evoke movement along an axis of memory, in particular regarding the history and conquest of Palestine. She saw her work as a contribution to the cause of liberation of her people, and inseparable from it.

Some of Al-Agha's art works are held in the collections of governments and private entities in Jordan and internationally.

== Literary works ==
Al-Agha authored many books on traditional art and crafts, has writings were published throughout the Arab world, and her poetry was broadcast on Jordanian radio. Her writings include short stories, poetry, prose, poetry and plays, among them:

Short Stories:

- وقالت للشجرة (And she said to the tree;)
- بلفور ، أللنبي وأنا (Balfour, Allenby and I)
- الدخـــــــــــــــــــــــان (Smoke)
- حمائم ورقية للفرح (Paper Doves for Joy)
- عينان صقريّتان (Falcon Eyes)
- جسد باتساع البياض (Body of Broad Whiteness)
- المقامة الحجرية (Stone Stature)
- المواطن س (Citizen S)
- طحالب الانتظار (Algae, Wait)

Poems:

- نغمات مائية (Water Ringtones)
- معزوفة الأقدام الصغيرة (Small Fiddle)
- أطروحة حب بغدادية (Baghdad Love Letter)

== Death and commemoration ==
Hanan Al-Agha died on April 19, 2008.

In 2009, a literary competition in Syria was established and named after her.

== See also ==
- Saba Mubarak
- Palestinians in Jordan
