= Margo Haddad =

Jordanian actress

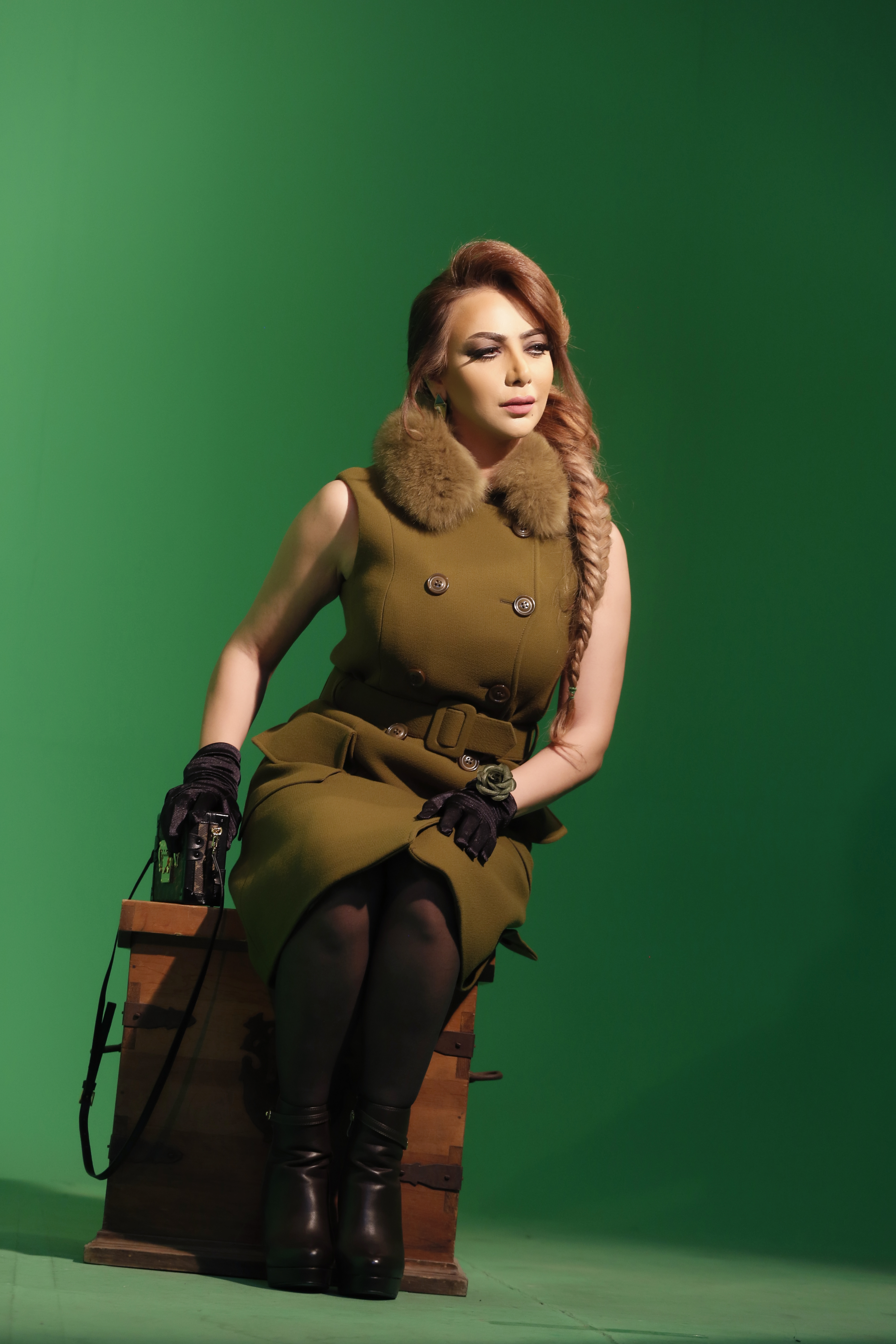
- Margo Haddad
- Born: February 26, 1988 (age 38); Jordan
- Citizenship: Jordanian
- Education: PhD
- Occupations: Actress, producer, writer
- Years active: 1997–present

Margo Haddad (Arabic: مارغو حداد) is a Jordanian director, actress and writer. She received a Bachelor of Fine Arts (Drama) from Yarmouk University and an MA in Mass media - Women's Studies from University of Jordan, she continued her studies in Egypt, in which she got her PhD in Academy of Arts in Art Criticism - Film Criticism, and received an honorary doctorate, from Cambridge International College in Egypt.

Creativity in the top of the issuance of her first book of its kind in the Arab world, holds the title of "The image of women and men in the video clip".

She participated in several Arab and local soap operas with many prominent directors like Hatem Ali, Mohammad Aziziyeh, Basil Al-Khatib and Chawki El Mejri.

== Career ==
=== Films & Series ===
- 2017 (House Of Setnakht) Bet Set - Directed by Ahmad Aqel
- 2017 Series Orchidia - Directed by Hatem Ali
- 2017 Series AlSultan Walshah - Directed by Mohammad Azizieh
- 2017 Series Shawq - Directed by Mohamed Lotfi
- 2015 The series of the Malek Ibn alRayb - directed by Mohammed Lotfi
- 2015 Epidemic - directed by Mohamed Ibrahimi
- 2014 Brothers Blood series - directed by Hassan Abu Shaireh
- 2013 Nafethat Al-Salam Movie - Directed by Ahmad Najem
- 2013 Series Toum Al Ghura
- 2011 Series dafater altofan Directed by mofaq al salah
- 2011 Series Awdat Al Amal - Directed by Mohammad Lutfi
- 2011 Al Ayadi Al bayda Movie - Directed by Mohammad Alwan
- 2010 Series Al Anud - Directed by Ahmad Duibes
- 2010 Series Balqees - Directed by Basel Alkhateeb
- 2008 Series Bent Alnur - Directed by Samer Barqawi
- 2008 series wadha wabn Ajlan Directed by Azmi Mustafa
- 2008 Series Sadun Alawaji - Directed by Natheer Awwad
- 2006 Series Altareek Alwaer Directed by Shawki Mejri
- 2006 Series Hek o mesh hek - Directed by Iyad Alkhanzur
- 2005 Series [Altareek ela Kabul] - Directed by Mohammad Aziziyeh
- 2005 Series Shehrazad - Directed by Shawqi Almajeri
- 2005 Series Shu Hal hake - Directed by Naji Taama
- 2003 Aljawareh Movie - Directed by Mohammad Alawale
- 2003 Series Ahlam Marzuq - Directed by Ahmad Duebes
- 2003 Series Durub Alhena' - Directed by Shalan Aldabas
- 2001 Series Abu Yousef (Ep. 2) - Directed by Nabeel Alshomali
- 2000 Series Abu Yousef (Ep. 1) - Directed by Nabeel Alshomali
- 2000 Series Ayam Aseeba - Directed by Mohammad Yousef Alabadi
- 2000 Series Ta'er Alshawq - Directed by Orwa Zrieqat
- 1999 Series Dumuu' AlQamar - Directed by Salem Alqurdi
- 1999 Series Khoyut fe Althalam - Directed by Khaled AlKhazur
- 1998 Series Rajul ala Alhamesh - Directed by Mohammad Haneya
- 1997 Al Haya Awalan Film - Directed by Faysal Alzobi
