= Mariam (film) =

- Directed by: Basil Al-Khatib
- Written by: Basil Al-Khatib, Taleed Al-Khatib
- Cinematography: Farhad Mahmoudi
- Music by: Hazem Al-Anitar
- Release date: 9 March 2013
- Running time: 110 minutes
- Country: Syria
- Language: Arabic

Mariam, also known Mary, is a 2013 Syrian Arabic-language drama film directed by Basil Al-Khatib. The film tells the story of three women, all named "Maryam", living through in three different periods starting in 1918, passing through the June setback in Quneitra in 1967, and until 2012 and was filmed in several areas of Syria, including Baniyas, Mashta al-Helu, and Quneitra. Music is by Hazem Al-Anitar; the colorist is Osama Said. The movie chronicles a hundred years of Syrian history.

Mariam won prizes at festivals in Cairo, Oran, and Dakhla, Morocco. Khatib believes that it is this focus on the “human element” in Syria's conflict which has made the film a hit with festival audiences and juries.

== Cast ==
- Ali Adel
- Sabah Al Jazaery
- Doha Al-Dabes
- Lama Al-Hakim
- Reem Ali
- Maisoun Abu Asaad
- Abed Fahed
- Sollaf Fawakhirgi
- Asad Fedda
- Nadin Khoury
- Roleen Al Qassim
- Jihaad Saad
- Sanaa Sawah
