= Saba Mubarak =

Jordanian actress and producer (born 1976)

- صبا مبارك
- Mubarak in 2014
- Born: Saba Ahmed Soliman Mubarak El Siouf; April 10, 1976 (age 50); Anjara, Jordan
- Other name: Queen of Hearts
- Occupation: Actress • producer
- Years active: 1998–present
- Known for: Acting and producing
- Notable work: Seraa Ala El Remal, The Invasion
- Spouse: Chawki Mejri (divorced)
- Children: 1
- Parent(s): Hanan Al-Agha (mother); Ahmed Mubarak (father)

Saba Ahmed Soliman Mubarak El Siouf (Arabic: صبا أحمد سليمان مبارك السيوف; born April 10, 1976, in Anjara, Jordan) is a Jordanian actress and producer.

She graduated from Yarmouk University in 2001 with a bachelor's degree in Theater acting and Directing. In 1998, she started her acting career with her role in the Jordanian TV series Qamar wa Sahar, directed by Mohamed Azizia. Since then, Mubarak has been part of many important TV dramas and films such as Balqis, Moga Harra, Al Ahd, the three seasons of Hekayat Banat from 2012 to 2017, the Price, Agent Hamilton: But Not If It Concerns Your Daughter and the Guest: Aleppo to Istanbul. She also had her first cinematic role in the Jordanian film Safar Al-Ajneha (Travel of the Wings) directed by Tha’er Mousa in 2003. Then she starred in several Jordanian films until her Egyptian cinema appearance, which came after her participation in Mohamed Amin's film Bentein Men Misr (Two Girls from Egypt). She is the daughter of the Palestinian plastic artist Hanan Al-Agha.

In 2011, Mubarak established Pan East Media, a Jordanian media production company. The company started its production activity in 2013 through the TV series Zain and Tawq Al Asphalt in 2014.

== Career ==
Mubarak studied theater acting and directing at Yarmouk University, from which she graduated in 2001.

She started her acting career in 1998 in the Jordanian TV show directed by Mohamed Azizia Qamar wa Sahar. She is considered as a first rate performer in Arab drama and has performed in over 40 TV productions. She has appeared in several Syrian and Egyptian television series including Al-Kawasr, Al-Arwah Al-Muhajerah, Omar Khayyam, Sada Al-Rouh, Ahl Al-Gharam, Al-Wardah Al-Akheerah, Seerat Al-Hob, Haza Al-Aalam, Seraa Ala El Remal, Wara'a Al-Shams, Ana Al-Quds, Al-Za'eem, Naseem Al-Rouh, Sharbat Louz, Hekayat Banat, Moga Harra, Asia, Al-Ahd: Al-Kalam Al-Mobah, Afrah Al-Qoba, and Tayea', in 2017, she started filming the third season of the 2012 TV series Hekayat Banat that follows the stories of four girls and their relationships, secret lives, dreams and ambitions. The series stars Mubarak alongside Horeya Farghaly, Dina El Sherbiny, Injy El Mokkaddem, Nada Moussa, Ramsi Lehner, and Amr Saleh.

Mubarak's debut in Arab cinema was in 2003 in the Tunisian film L'Odyssée. She has appeared in several Jordanian, Syrian and Egyptian films including Safar Al-Ajneha, Out of Coverage, Junoon Al-Hob, Transit Cities, Bentein Men Misr, Kingdom of the Ants, The Monk and The Price. She started working in Egypt in 2010 with her role in the film Bentein Men Misr (Two Girls from Egypt). In 2012, she participated in another Egyptian film, Al-Raheb (The Monk), alongside the Egyptian actor Hani Salama. Her third participation in Egyptian cinema was in Hisham Al-Aysawi's film The Price (Al Thaman), alongside the Egyptian actor Amr Youssef; she played a Syrian woman called Dima, who flees her home and takes refuge in Cairo, where she meets an Egyptian man called Magdy and then a mixture of events begin to unfold. She has taken part in two Swedish films Hamilton: In the Interest of the Nation and Agent Hamilton: But Not If It Concerns Your Daughter in 2012. Then she participated in the Turkish film The Guest: Aleppo to Istanbul.

In 2011, Mubarak established Pan East Media, a Jordanian production house owned and managed by Saba Mubarak with a main objective to create a genuine audio-visual content in Jordan and to present first-rate artistic work on both regional and international levels. The company started its production activity in 2013 with the light Jordanian comedy drama TV series Zain, which aired on multiple Arabic TV networks including MBC and Abu Dhabi One. In 2014, the company produced the TV series Tawq Al-Asphalt, a Bedouin historic drama series inspired by Shakespeare's Hamlet. It was aired during Ramadan 2014 on Abu Dhabi One.

== Filmography ==
=== Films ===
==== Actress ====
Title	Year	Role	Notes	Refs
L'Odyssée	2003	Enas		
Safar Al-Ajneha	2004			
Out of Coverage	2007			
Junoon Al-Hob	2008			
Transit Cities	2010	Laila		
Bentein Men Misr	2010	Dalia		
Hamilton: In the Interest of the Nation	2012	Mouna Al Fathar		
Agent Hamilton: But Not If It Concerns Your Daughter	2012	Mouna Al Fathar		
Kingdom of the Ants	2012			
The Monk	2014		Production	
The Price	2015	Dima		
The Guest: Aleppo to Istanbul	2017	Meryem	Completed	
Amira	2021			
Daughters of Abdulrahman	2021	Amal		

==== Producer ====
Title	Year	Role	Notes
The Guest: Aleppo to Istanbul	2017	Co-producer	
Daughters of Abdulrahman	2021		

=== Television ===
==== Actress ====
Title	Year	Role	Notes	Refs
Qamar wa Sahar	1998			
Shawk El-Rahaf	1998	Rahaf		
Al-Kawasr	1998	Buthainah		
Omar Khayyam	2002	Nesreen		
Al-Arwah Al-Muhajerah	2002	Amal		
Al-Hajjaj	2003	Ghazalah		
Khalf Al-Qudban	2005	Danah		
Akhir Ayyam Al-Yamama	2005	Al Shmous		
Al-Shams Toshreq Min Jadeed	2005	Maram		
Khaled Ben Al-Waleed	2006	Hend		
Ahl Al-Gharam I	2006			
Sada Al-Rouh	2006			
Al-Wardah Al-Akheerah	2006	Rudainah		
Du'aah Ala Abwab Juhannam	2006			
Seerat Al-Hob	2007			
Nimer Bin Adwan	2007	Wadha		
Haza Al-Aalam	2007			
The Invasion	2008	Hanan		
Oyoun Alia	2008	Alia		
Seraa Ala El Remal	2008	Al-Hunoof		
Naseem Al-Rouh	2008	Asaker		
Ahl Al-Gharam II	2008			
Balqis	2009	Balqis		
Balqis: Queen of Sheba	2009	Balqis		
Wara'a El-Shams	2010	Mouna		
Ana Al-Quds	2010			
Bath Bayakhah	2011			
Wein Matkaha Ewja	2011			
Eila Ajab	2011			
Kashf El-Aqne'ah	2011			
Al-Za'eem	2011	Jameela		
Fee Meil	2012			
Sharbat Louz	2012	Rasha		
Hekayat Banat I	2012	Ahlam		
Ma Betekhlas Hekayetna	2012			
Khalaf-Allah	2013			
Asia	2013	Dr. Nardeen		
Mawja Harrah	2013	Jameela		
Zain	2013	Zain		
Tawk Al-Asphalt	2014			
Al-Ahd	2015	Raya		
Haq Mayyet	2015	Nihal Mufeed		
Afrah Al-Qobba	2016	Doria		
Hekayat Banat II	2017	Ahlam		
Hekayat Banat III	2017	Ahlam		
Tayea'	2018	Mohga		
Oboor	2019	Salma		
Nemra Etnin	2020	Dana		
Hares Al-Jabal	2020	Rimal		
Anbar 6	2021			
Touba	2022	Ehssan		
Suits bil Arabi	2022	Farida El-Masiri		
Moon Knight	2022	Ammit (voice)	Episode: "Gods and Monsters"	
Bean Elsotour	2024			
La7zat Ghadab	2024			
Watar Hassas	2024			

==== Producer ====
Title	Year	Role	Notes	Refs
Zain	2013	Executive producer		
Oboor	2019			

== Awards ==
Mubarak has received several awards through her successful career:

- Best Actress Award, Middle East Film Festival 2003, Italy
- Best Jordanian and Arab Actress Award, Tyche Awards, Jordan
- Best Jordanian Actress Award, Jordan Awards, Jordan

== Personal life ==
Mubarak was born to a Jordanian father (Ahmed Mubarak) and a Palestinian mother (Hanan Al-Agha). She has one sister, Aya Wuhoush. She got her bachelor's degree from Yarmouk University in Irbid in 2001. She is a fan of sports and nature. She spends time in the gym, as well as jogging or walking outside in nature. She also loves swimming and kickboxing.

Her first marriage to the late Tunisian director Chawki Mejri ended with divorce, and she has a son called Ammar born in 2004.

Mubarak is a Muslim, but she played a Christian woman in the Egyptian film The Monk.

== See also ==
- List of Jordanian actors
- List of Jordanians
