= Edward II (film) =

1991 British romantic historical drama film

- Theatrical release poster
- Directed by: Derek Jarman
- Screenplay by: Ken Butler; Derek Jarman; Stephen McBride
- Based on: Edward II by Christopher Marlowe
- Produced by: Steve Clark-Hall; Antony Root
- Starring: Steven Waddington; Andrew Tiernan; Tilda Swinton; Nigel Terry; Kevin Collins; Jerome Flynn; John Lynch; Dudley Sutton
- Cinematography: Ian Wilson
- Edited by: George Akers
- Music by: Simon Fisher Turner
- Production companies: BBC Films; British Screen; Working Title Films
- Distributed by: Palace Pictures
- Release date: 18 October 1991
- Running time: 90 minutes
- Country: United Kingdom
- Language: English
- Budget: £750,000
- Box office: $694,438

Edward II is a 1991 British romantic historical drama film directed by Derek Jarman and starring Steven Waddington, Tilda Swinton and Andrew Tiernan. It is based on the play of the same name by Christopher Marlowe. The plot revolves around Edward II of England's infatuation with Piers Gaveston, which proves to be the downfall of both of them, thanks to the machinations of Roger Mortimer.

The film is staged in a postmodern style, using a mixture of contemporary and medieval props, sets and clothing. The gay content of the play is also brought to the fore by Jarman, notably by adding a homosexual sex scene and by depicting Edward's army as gay rights protesters.

== Plot ==
Once installed as king following the death of his father, Edward II summons his friend and lover, Piers Gaveston, back to England from exile abroad, and showers him with gifts, titles, and abiding love. Their relationship is fiery and passionate, but it is the focus of gossip and derision throughout the kingdom. Upon his return, Gaveston takes revenge on the Bishop of Winchester, who had been responsible for his banishment from England during the previous reign, by personally torturing him. Kent, Edward's brother, is the first to protest about Gaveston's return. Many others feel the same way, including the Bishop of Winchester and Lord Mortimer, who is in charge of the kingdom's military forces. Nevertheless, Edward defends his lover from his mounting enemies.

A pleasure-seeker, Edward is quite distracted from the affairs of the state, much to the distress and anger of the court (somber men and women in business suits). Queen Isabella, Edward's French wife, vainly tries everything to win him back from his lover but is mercilessly rejected by her husband. Love-starved, Isabella turns to Gaveston, who inflames her desire by whispering obscenities in her ear and then mocks her responsiveness.

The handsome, hedonistic, and opportunistic Gaveston repels everyone except the king. His enemies join forces and threaten Edward with dethronement and exile; Edward is forced to comply with their wishes and sends Gaveston away. The lovers' separation is serenaded by Annie Lennox's rendition of Cole Porter's "Ev'ry Time We Say Goodbye".

The queen hopes that once Gaveston is away she can reconcile with her husband, but he rejects her once again. In a last effort to regain her husband's affection, she allows Gaveston to return. The king and his lover resume their relationship, but their enemies are ready to strike back.

Isabella and Mortimer, who has become her lover, plan to rule the realm through Edward and Isabella's young son, the future Edward III. When Kent tries to save his brother, he is murdered by Isabella. The nobles are soon plotting to get rid not only of Gaveston but also the king. Mortimer, their leader, is a military man and practicing sadomasochist who takes a grim pleasure in personally torturing Gaveston and the lovers' friend Spencer, whom he addresses as "girl boy." Their torture takes place while there is a clash between the police and members of the British gay rights organisation OutRage!

After Gaveston's and Spencer's assassinations, Edward, who has been thrown in a dungeon, is executed by impalement on a red-hot poker. This hideous fate is presented as a nightmare from which the imprisoned king awakens. The executioner, when he does arrive, tosses away his lethal weapon and kisses the man he was sent to kill.

Back in the castle, Mortimer and Isabella enjoy their triumph just briefly. The king's young son, Edward III, who all along has been neglected by both parents and who has witnessed their quarrels, has donned his mother's earrings and lipstick and, while listening to classical music on his Walkman, walks atop a cage that imprisons his mother and Mortimer.

== Cast ==
- Steven Waddington as Edward II
- Tilda Swinton as Isabella
- Andrew Tiernan as Piers Gaveston
- Nigel Terry as Mortimer
- John Lynch as Spencer
- Dudley Sutton as Bishop of Winchester
- Jerome Flynn as Kent
- Jody Graber as Prince Edward
- Annie Lennox as The Singer

== Production ==
=== Development ===
The idea of adapting Christopher Marlowe's Edward II originated after writer Edmund White suggested in a review of Jarman's Caravaggio (1986) that the director should film the play. Jarman initially developed a different project entitled Sod 'Em, a dystopian satire set in a near-future Britain in which homosexuality has been recriminalised and discussion of it is banned. The screenplay follows an actor named Edward, persecuted after appearing in a production of Edward II.

The BBC later proposed a direct adaptation of Marlowe's play, and Jarman began writing the screenplay with Stephen McBride, who had previously appeared in War Requiem and provided a voice in The Garden. Together they condensed Marlowe's text while introducing contemporary political references and substantially altering the ending.

The film was produced on a budget of approximately £750,000, financed by the BBC, British Screen and Japanese backer Takashi Asai, making it the largest budget of Jarman's career.

=== Design ===
Production designer Christopher Hobbs, a long-time collaborator of Jarman's, based the film's austere visual style partly on Jarman's recent visit to the Cloisters museum in New York. Costume designer Sandy Powell deliberately combined medieval and contemporary clothing, creating the film's distinctive anachronistic visual style.

=== Casting ===
Keith Collins, Jarman's partner, was cast as Lightborn's jailer, while Steven Waddington was recommended by Nigel Terry during the casting process.

Annie Lennox appears in the film performing Cole Porter's "Every Time We Say Goodbye". Jarman had originally intended to direct a music video for Lennox's recording for the AIDS charity album Red Hot + Blue, but ill health prevented the project from proceeding.

Numerous members of the production team appeared as extras, including costume designer Sandy Powell, production designer Christopher Hobbs and Jarman's niece Kate Temple, who had previously played Miranda in The Tempest. Lloyd Newson and Nigel Charnock of DV8 Physical Theatre also appear, while members of OutRage! and the Sisters of Perpetual Indulgence were cast among Edward's supporters.

=== Filming ===
Principal photography began in February 1991 at Bray Studios in Berkshire, formerly home to Hammer Film Productions.

Because Jarman's health had deteriorated as a result of HIV/AIDS-related illness, producer Ken Butler was prepared to assume directing duties on days when Jarman was unable to work.

During filming, members of OutRage!, who were working as extras, interrupted a recording session by singer Cliff Richard elsewhere at Bray Studios as part of an attempt to publicly "out" him. The incident attracted tabloid coverage and briefly raised concerns that legal action might disrupt production. Tensions were further heightened after members of the group retaliated against the nearby band Status Quo, whose rehearsals had repeatedly disrupted filming because of noise from an adjacent soundstage.

== Release ==
Edward II premiered at the 1991 Edinburgh International Film Festival, where it received a positive reception. It subsequently screened in competition at the Venice Film Festival, where Tilda Swinton won the Volpi Cup for Best Actress.

The film opened in London's West End on 15 October 1991 at the Curzon West End cinema. The premiere was followed by a one-off Pet Shop Boys concert at Heaven nightclub in aid of HIV/AIDS research at St Mary's Hospital.

The film screened at the 1992 Sundance Film Festival. During the festival, Jarman participated in a panel discussion on the emerging New Queer Cinema movement, moderated by B. Ruby Rich and featuring Todd Haynes, Isaac Julien, Tom Kalin, Sadie Benning and others.

It subsequently screened at the 42nd Berlin International Film Festival, where it won both the Teddy Award and the FIPRESCI Prize.

== Reception ==
The film received positive reviews from critics. It holds a 100% score on the review-aggregator site Rotten Tomatoes.

Peter Travers of Rolling Stone called the film "a piercing cry from the heart", praising Jarman's use of anachronism and describing Tilda Swinton as "a sexy, roaring wonder". He concluded that Jarman transformed Marlowe's play into "more than a visually arresting stunt". Jonathan Rosenbaum of the Chicago Reader described Edward II as Jarman's best film to date and argued that it gave Marlowe's tragedy "a seriousness and potency" surpassing Peter Greenaway's Prospero's Books. Stephen Holden of The New York Times wrote that Jarman had invested Marlowe's play with "a powerful contemporary resonance", although he felt the film unfolded as a sequence of tableaux in which the imagery often proved more striking than the poetry.

Reviews were not universally enthusiastic. Peter Rainer of the Los Angeles Times criticised Steven Waddington's performance and argued that Jarman's interpretation reduced Edward and Gaveston to political martyrs. Jonathan Romney praised Jarman's distinctive visual imagination but argued that the accumulation of symbolic imagery sometimes overwhelmed Marlowe's play, while describing the film's reversal of traditional cinematic attitudes towards homosexuality as a deliberate polemical strategy. While Marjorie Baumgarten of the Austin Chronicle praised the film, like Romney she questioned what she saw as misogynistic aspects of Isabella's portrayal.

The film also became the subject of controversy following Alexander Walker's review in the Evening Standard, which criticised both the film and Jarman's public discussion of his HIV status. After Jarman's medical adviser Tony Pinching defended the director in a published letter, Walker responded by criticising Jarman's discussion of safer sex in Modern Nature. Jarman replied that HIV should not be associated with promiscuity provided safer sex practices were followed.

Later that year Jarman declined a special Evening Standard award for cinematic achievement, citing what he regarded as the newspaper's homophobia. Members of OutRage! staged a protest outside the awards ceremony, while costume designer Sandy Powell echoed their criticisms when accepting her own award on stage for her work on Edward II.

Retrospective assessments have identified Edward II as one of Jarman's finest works and a landmark of the New Queer Cinema movement. Writing for The Village Voice in 2018, Alan Scherstuhl described it as a "startling and singular radicalization" of Marlowe's play and singled out Tilda Swinton's performance for particular praise.

== Accolades ==
Year	Award	Category	Recipient(s)	Result
1991	Venice Film Festival	Volpi Cup for Best Actress	Tilda Swinton	Won
1991	Venice Film Festival	Golden Lion	Derek Jarman	Nominated
1992	42nd Berlin International Film Festival	Teddy Award	Edward II	Won
1992	42nd Berlin International Film Festival	FIPRESCI Prize	Edward II	Won
1992	Dinard British Film Festival	Golden Hitchcock	Derek Jarman	Won
1992	Evening Standard British Film Awards	Best Technical/Artistic Achievement	Sandy Powell (shared with The Miracle and The Pope Must Diet)	Won

== Sources ==
- Peake, Tony (2011). Derek Jarman: A Biography. University of Minnesota Press.
- Jarman, Derek (2011). Smiling in Slow Motion. University of Minnesota Press.
- Jarman, Derek (1991). Queer Edward II. British Film Institute.
