= Steven Waddington =

English film and television actor (born 1967)

- Waddington at the 2026 BFI London Film Festival
- Born: 30 December 1967 (age 58); Leeds, West Riding of Yorkshire, England
- Occupation: Actor
- Years active: 1991–present
- Spouse: Jane March (m.)
- Children: 1

Steven Waddington (born 30 December 1967) is an English film and television actor. He is best known for his starring role as the title role of Derek Jarman's Edward II and supporting role in Michael Mann's The Last of the Mohicans.

== Early life ==
Waddington was born in Leeds, West Riding of Yorkshire, the younger child of Peter Waddington and Averill Stubbs. He attended Old Farnley Primary School, Ryecroft Middle School and Intake High School, all in Leeds. He acted in school plays and appeared in several Yorkshire Television productions, among them Emmerdale Farm and Eighteen Desperate Hours, sometimes as an extra and sometimes with a few lines of dialogue. Shortly after his eighteenth birthday he won a place at East 15 Acting School in Loughton, Essex.

He finished his training in the summer of 1989 and subsequently joined the Royal Shakespeare Company (RSC), first at Stratford, and then at the Barbican and on tour in Newcastle. He was cast in his first film, Edward II, in the title role, after being recommended to director Derek Jarman by fellow actor Nigel Terry, with whom he had worked previously in a production of Pericles at the RSC.

== Career ==
Waddington made his debut with the 1991 film Edward II, where he portrayed title character Edward II. He appeared in 1992's Last of the Mohicans in a supporting role as Duncan Heyward. He also appeared in Tim Burton's 1999 film version of Sleepy Hollow as Mr Killian. He played a lead role as Jeff in Steve Coogan's The Parole Officer (2001). Waddington then starred as Prasutagus in the 2003 film Boudica. He also portrayed the Duke of Buckingham (who, coincidentally, was related to Edward II) in the Showtime series The Tudors in 2007.

He later appeared in the ITV drama Vital Signs along with Tamzin Outhwaite, and starred as King Richard in the Series 2 finale of Robin Hood. Waddington also starred as Wilfred of Ivanhoe in the 1997 BBC/A&E production of Ivanhoe, based on the novel by Sir Walter Scott. Waddington reprised his role as Richard the Lionheart in the BBC/Discovery Channel drama documentary Heroes and Villains: Richard the Lionheart (2007).

From April to July 2010 he portrayed canteen head Adam Fleet in Waterloo Road. He featured in two Swedish films. In 2008 he played the role of Arnold of Torroja in the film and mini-series Arn - The Knight Templar and McCullen in Agent Hamilton: But Not If It Concerns Your Daughter in 2012. In 2012 he appeared in the four-part ITV mini-series Titanic.

He played the role of Marshall Redwick in the Sky One series Jamestown, which premiered in 2017.

He also had a part in Thomas Vinterberg's 2018 political thriller Kursk, based on the true story of a doomed Russian submarine.

In 2022, he played The Scotsman in Uncharted, opposite Tom Holland and Mark Wahlberg.

In 2024, it was announced that Waddington was writing and directing a biographical film based on the life of snooker player Jimmy White, with Aneurin Barnard and Ray Winstone signed on to star in the film.

== Personal life ==
Waddington is married to actress and model Jane March, and has one son.

== Filmography ==
=== Film ===
Year	Title	Role	Notes
1991	Edward II	King Edward II	
1992	The Last of the Mohicans	Major Duncan Hayward	
1992	1492: Conquest of Paradise	Bartolomeo Columbus	
1994	Don’t Get Me Started	Jerry Hoff	
1994	Prince of Jutland	Ribold	
1995	Carrington	Ralph Partridge	
1997	Breakdown	Cowboy in Bank	
1997	Face	Stevie	
1998	Tarzan and the Lost City	Nigel Ravens	
1999	Sleepy Hollow	Killian	
2000	The Unscarred	Travis Moore	
2001	The Hole	DCS Tom Howard	
2001	The Parole Officer	Jeff	
2003	Boudica	King Prasutagus	
2005	Breakfast on Pluto	Inspector Routledge	
2007	Arn: The Knight Templar	Arnold of Torroja	
2008	Largo Winch	Stephan Marcus	
2010	Ultramarines: A Warhammer 40,000 Movie	Brother Verenor	Voice role
2012	When the Lights Went Out	Len	
2012	The Sweeney	Detective Constable Miller	
2012	Agent Hamilton: But Not If It Concerns Your Daughter	McCullen	
2014	A Little Chaos	Thierry Duras	
2014	The Imitation Game	Police Superintendent Smith	
2014	One Night in Istanbul	Tommy	
2015	Bridgend	Dave	
2018	Kursk	Graham Mann	
2022	Uncharted	The Scotsman	
2024	The Partisan		
2027	Untitled Tim Miller film		Filming

=== Television ===
Year	Title	Role	Notes
1992	Screen Two	Murray Ritchie	1 episode
1993	Between the Lines	D.S. Slater	1 episode
1995	Resort to Murder	Neville	Miniseries, 5 episodes
1996	The One That Got Away	Dinger	Television film
1996	Ivanhoe	Ivanhoe	Miniseries, 6 episodes
2006	The Curse of King Tut's Tomb	Jason McGreevy	Television film
2006	Vital Signs	Tony Bradley	Main role, 6 episodes
2007	The Tudors	Duke of Buckingham	2 episodes
2007	Robin Hood	King Richard	1 episode
2008	Heroes and Villains	Richard the Lionheart	1 episode
2009	Garrow's Law	Forrester	2 episodes
2010	Waterloo Road	Adam Fleet	Recurring role, 8 episodes
2012	Titanic	Second Officer Charles Lightoller	Miniseries, 4 episodes
2013	The Syndicate	Steve	Recurring role, 6 episodes
2014	Halo Nightfall	Randall Aiken	5 episodes
2016	Barbarians Rising	Fritigern	1 episode
2016	Medici	Cossa	1 episode
2017–2019	Jamestown	Redwick	Recurring role, 16 episodes
2022	Slow Horses	Jed Moody	4 episodes
2023	The Long Shadow	DSI Dick Holland	6 episodes
2025	Robin Hood	Earl of Huntingdon	
