= Ivanhoe (1997 TV series) =

- Story by: Ivanhoe by Walter Scott
- Directed by: Stuart Orme
- Starring: Steven Waddington; Susan Lynch; Ciarán Hinds; Jimmy Chisholm
- Composer: Colin Towns
- Countries of origin: United Kingdom; United States
- Original language: English
- No. of series: 1
- No. of episodes: 6

Production
- Executive producers: Chris Parr (BBC); Delia Fine (A&E)
- Producer: Jeremy Gwilt
- Running time: 50 minutes
- Production company: BBC Productions in association with A&E Network production

Original release
- Network: BBC1
- Release: 12 January – 16 February 1997

Ivanhoe is a 1997 American/British six-part television historical drama based on the 1819 novel Ivanhoe by Sir Walter Scott. It was produced by the BBC and A&E Network and consisted of six 50-minute episodes.

== Plot ==
This adaptation of Sir Walter Scott's novel is set in 1192 AD and depicts a disinherited knight who is accused of treachery. He returns anonymously to his home in England, to clear his name and win his lady love. Richard I of England had been a prisoner in an Austrian dungeon, but is now returning to an England ruled by Prince John. The production claims realism, mainly through a depiction of a very rough and poverty-stricken time; the producers claim this is in contrast to earlier, "sanitised" versions. People wear layers of often old, sometimes ragged clothing to keep the cold out, are sometimes dirty, and have long, shaggy hair and beards.

== TV episodes ==
Episode 1: The knight and crusader Ivanhoe is released from an Austrian prison after refusing to betray King Richard. He returns to England, where it is rumored that he did betray the King. Ivanhoe must clear his name and save his beloved Rowena from a loveless marriage to Prince Athelstane. Disguised as a pilgrim, he comes to the aid of a stranger, Isaac of York, who offers Ivanhoe a chance to compete in Prince John's tournament.

Episode 2: At the tournament, Ivanhoe defeats the Norman knights and earns the enmity of Prince John. In the second day of tournament, the Prince champions a group of his Norman henchmen, including the former crusader Bois-Guilbert, against Ivanhoe and the Saxons. Ivanhoe is joined by the mysterious Black Knight, and Bois-Guilbert and the Normans are defeated.

Episode 3: Wounded in the tournament against the Normans, Ivanhoe is tended to by the beautiful healer Rebecca, daughter of Isaac of York. Meanwhile, Bois-Guilbert schemes to steal Rowena for one of his cohorts. Disguised as outlaws, the Normans storm the Saxon camp, kidnapping Rowena, Ivanhoe, his father, Rebecca and Isaac.

Episode 4: Robin Hood, known as Robin of Locksley, and his allies, along with the Black Knight, prepare to attack the castle where Ivanhoe and his companions are held. Inside, Rebecca and Ivanhoe discover their love for one another. When the castle is stormed, the Saxons save Rowena from Bois-Guilbert. He then kidnaps Rebecca, whom he secretly loves, and they flee as the castle burns.

Episode 5: An attempt is made on the Black Knight's life, and he reveals himself as King Richard to his outlaw comrades. Meanwhile, John sentences Rebecca to burn as a witch, and her only chance for survival is to demand a trial by combat. Bois-Guilbert will act as the court's champion—but who will defend the honor of Rebecca?

Episode 6: King Richard assures his supporters that Ivanhoe never betrayed him, clearing the way for Ivanhoe's marriage to Rowena. Ivanhoe then learns of Rebecca's fate, and a devastated Rowena begs him not to ride to her defense. But Ivanhoe will not miss the chance to fight Bois-Guilbert—and finally right old wrongs.

== Cast ==
- Steven Waddington as Ivanhoe
- Ciaran Madden as Urfried
- Ciarán Hinds as Bois Guilbert
- Susan Lynch as Rebecca
- Jimmy Chisholm as Wamba
- Nick Brimble as Front de Boeuf
- Valentine Pelka as Maurice de Bracy
- David Nicholls as Little John
- James Cosmo as Cedric
- Chris Walker as Athelstane
- Simon Donald as Louis Winklebrand
- Roger Ashton-Griffiths as Prior Aymer
- Dermot Keaney as Brother Ambrose
- Trevor Cooper as Gurth
- Ron Donachie as Friar Tuck
- Aden Gillett as Robin of Locksley
- David Horovitch as Isaac
- Rory Edwards as King Richard
- Victoria Smurfit as Rowena
- Peter Guinness as Montfitchet
- Christopher Lee as Beaumanoir
- Jack Klaff as Malvoisin
- Peter Needham as Abbot
- David Barrass as Hubert
- Renny Krupinski as Bardon
- Ralph Brown as Prince John
- Ronald Pickup as Fitzurse
- Siân Phillips as Eleanor of Aquitaine

== Experts behind the series ==
- Stunt Coordinator: Gareth Milne
- Horse Master: Steve Dent
- Sword Master: Nick Powell
- Stunt Performers: Joss Gower, Nick Hobbs, Nrinder Dhudwar, Tom Lucy
- Historical Advisor: Christopher Gravett
- Judaica Advisor: Lewis Glinert
- Armourer: Rob Partridge

== Production ==
Parts of the series were shot at Doune Castle, Hermitage Castle in the Scottish Borders, and at Craigmillar Castle and Blackness Castle near Edinburgh.

== Home media ==
The series was released on a set of six VHS tapes and also on a two-disc DVD set.

== See also ==
- List of historical drama films
