= Chawki Mejri =

Tunisian film director (1961–2019)

- شوقي الماجري
- Born: Chawki Ben Ammar Hadj Mubarak Mejri; November 11, 1961; Tunis, Tunisia
- Died: October 10, 2019 (aged 57); Cairo
- Education: Sadiki College; National Film School in Łódź
- Occupation: Film director
- Spouse: Saba Mubarak

Chawki Mejri (Arabic: شوقي الماجري, November 11, 1961 – October 10, 2019) was a Tunisian film director, noted for his films realisation in Syria and Egypt, best known as the director of the Kingdom of Ants movie.

== Biography ==
Born November 11, 1961 in Tunis, he is a former student of Sadiki College, he took his master's degree in cinematography from the National Film School in Łódź in 1996.

Chawki spent most of his career in Syria and then in Egypt, where he became known for his dramatic television films including short films, yet in 2012 he directed a feature film about the Palestinian cause Kingdom of Ants which enumerates the history of a family during the 2002 Palestine events, and highlights the difference between the reality and the dream.

On October 10, 2019 Chawki died of heart attack in a hospital in Cairo.

== Personal life ==
He was married to the Jordanian actress Saba Mubarak, with one son.

== Filmography ==
Feature film:

- Tawq (توق)
- Daqiqt Samt (دقيقة صمت)
- Kingdom of Ants (مملكة النمل)
- Napoléon wal Mahroussa (نابليون و المحروسة)
- Tej min chouk (تاج من شوك)
- Ikwatou El Tourab (إخوة التراب)
- El Arwahou El Mouhajira (الأرواح المهاجرة)
- Omar Khayyam (عمر الخيّام)
- Tarik El Waer (الطريق الوعر)
- Abnaou Errachid (أبناء الرشيد: الأمين والمأمون)
- Al-Mansur (أبو جعفر المنصور)
- El Ijtiyah (الاجتياح)
- Asmahan (أسمهان)
- Houdou Nessbi (هدوء نسبي)

== Awards ==
- International Emmy Awards(2007)
- Adonia award (2008 and 2009)
- Officier (2016) and Commander (2019) of the Tunisian Order of Merit
