= Label Me =

- Directed by: Kai Kreuser
- Written by: Kai Kreuser
- Produced by: Sonja Kessler; Jenny Lorenz-Kreindl
- Starring: Renato Schuch; Nikolaus Benda
- Cinematography: Malte Hafner
- Edited by: Tabea Hannappel
- Music by: Max Kelm
- Production company: Internationale Filmschule Köln
- Distributed by: Salzgeber
- Release date: 15 January 2019 (Max Ophüls Filmfestival Saarbrücken)
- Running time: 90 minutes
- Country: Germany
- Languages: English; German; Arabic

Label Me is a 2019 German drama film directed by Kai Kreuser, starring Renato Schuch and Nikolaus Benda.

== Cast ==
- Renato Schuch as Lars
- Nikolaus Benda as Waseem
- Cem Aydın as Junis
- Jogi Kaiser as Geschäftsmann
- Thomas Balou Martin as Security Chief
- Georg Baluza as Amir
- Timur Ülker as Charif
- Gioele Viola as Abdul Kareem
- Damon Zolfaghari as Security 2
- Emanuel Weber as Security 3
- Christoph Wielinger as Mann Anfang 40
- Lea Fleck

== Reception ==
David Rooney of The Hollywood Reporter called the film an "evocatively shot and persuasively acted character study", as well as a "solid calling card" for Kreuser, Schuch and Benda.

Andrew Emerson of Film Threat gave the film a score of 6.5/10 and wrote that while Kreuser "stints on character development", Schuch and Benda are "dedicated and mesmerizing", and can "pack worlds of emotional nuance into something as simple as a stare or a grimace".
