= Agent Hamilton (TV series) =

2020 Swedish television series

- Genre: Spy novel Thriller
- Written by: Petter S. Rosenlund
- Directed by: Erik Leijonborg
- Starring: Jakob Oftebro; Nina Zanjani
- Country of origin: Sweden
- Original languages: Swedish; English
- No. of seasons: 2
- No. of episodes: 17

Production
- Running time: 43 minutes
- Production companies: Dramacorp Pampas Studios; Kärnfilm; ZDF Studios

Original release
- Release: 1 January 2020 – May 9, 2022

Agent Hamilton is a Swedish spy thriller television series loosely based on the Carl Hamilton novels book series by Jan Guillou about Swedish secret agent Carl Hamilton. Norwegian actor Jakob Oftebro plays the title role. The spy thriller is set in the present time, with scenes from around Europe.

The series was presented at the MIPCOM in Cannes in 2019 and was premiered on C More on January 1, 2020. The first season consisted of 9 episodes and began airing on 1 January 2020. The second season had eight episodes and began airing on 18 April 2022.

== Synopsis ==
Hamilton has just returned to Stockholm after several years of special training in the US, and a series of cyberattacks and bombings are occurring. An ex-member, he is engaged by the Swedish Security Service (SÄPO) to identify the attack source. Involving various locations, Hamilton is concerned about multinational business interests creating a new Cold War. The Russian, Swedish, and American intelligence services are also involved.

== Cast and characters ==
- Jakob Oftebro as Carl Hamilton, a field operator and CIA asset in the Swedish Military Intelligence and Security Service. He has trained as a Swedish frogman and as a US Navy SEAL.
- Annika Hallin as Astrid Bofors, Hamilton's immediate boss at Swedish Military Intelligence.
- Nina Zanjani as Kristin Ek, a member of the SÄPO black ops division.
- Jörgen Thorsson as Birger Hagman, an expert in computer systems and electronics in Hamilton's unit at Swedish Military Intelligence.
- Peter Andersson as Christer Näslund, Head of SÄPO.
- Krister Henriksson as 'DG', head of the most classified part of the Swedish Military Intelligence Agency, OP5.
- Katia Winter as Sonja Widén, Hamilton's romantic interest

== Production ==
Compared to the earlier Carl Hamilton adaptations, smartphones were introduced, as well as changing the ideological power plays.

Filming was done in 2019 in Lithuania by DramaCorp and Kärnfilm. Youssef Louchi served as production manager on nine episodes of the series.

== Episodes ==
=== Season 1 ===
- Episode 1. Hamilton returns home to Stockholm from a secret CIA program in the United States of America, when the capital was subject to bombings and cyberattacks.
- Episode 2. Hamilton travels to Palestine on a mission to find out more about the terrorists and agendas.
- Episode 3. Hamilton returns to Sweden continuing the hunt for the terrorists.
- Episode 4. Hamilton working at SÄPO, finding out about a USB hard drive with secret information.
- Episode 5. Hamilton and Ek arrive in Hamburg to help the BND intelligence service about terrorists.
- Episode 6. Hamilton saves Ek from the burning warehouse.
- Episode 7. Hamilton tracks down Widén to tell her the truth at their meeting.
- Episode 8. Ek starts interrogating an arrested Hamilton, suspecting somebody has framed him.
- Episode 9. Hamilton travels to Ukraine to find what intelligence had been communicated by other agents. There is a gun fight with other groups.
- Episode 10. Hamilton is betrayed by another person as Stockholm receives a new and larger cyberattack.

== Broadcast ==
Agent Hamilton premiered on Nordic C More Entertainment on 1 January 2020, followed by Sweden TV4. The series was also presold to SBS Australia and aired on 25 March 2020, in English with occasional subtitles. It has also been picked up by Norway TV2, Denmark DR, and Finland MTV3. The series is also being aired by the Belgian Canvas (TV channel) as of March 2021.

== See also ==
- Jason Bourne films
- James Bond films
