= Carl Hamilton novels =

Carl Hamilton
- Carl Hamilton character
- First appearance: Coq Rouge
- Last appearance: Men inte om det gäller din dotter (But not if it concerns your daughter)
- Created by: Jan Guillou
- Portrayed by: Stellan Skarsgård; Peter Haber; Stefan Sauk; Peter Stormare; Mikael Persbrandt; Jakob Oftebro

In-universe information
- Gender: Male
- Occupation: Spy
- Nationality: Swedish

The Carl Hamilton novels is a book series by Swedish author and journalist Jan Guillou centered on the fictional Swedish spy Carl Gustaf Gilbert Hamilton. The main character is an elite intelligence officer working for the Swedish Security agency and Intelligence agency during the end of the Cold War, residing in Stockholm but active internationally.

Carl Hamilton has been called "Sweden's James Bond", but the plot of Guillou's novels also has a heavy focus on politics and journalism. One commentator said the books "... place [Guillou] besides John le Carré and Len Deighton" (famous British spy novelists). The first novel was published in 1986 and the series is a best-seller in Sweden, with more than 10 million sold copies. The character of Carl Hamilton has also appeared in a number of film and television adaptations.

== Novels ==
Carl Hamilton is the main character of the first ten novels released between 1986 and 1995. He makes a return as a supporting character in the novels Madame Terror (2006) and Men inte om det gäller din dotter (2008). He also makes a short appearance as a minor character in De som dödar drömmar sover aldrig (2018) and Den andra dödssynden (2019).

- 1986 – Coq Rouge
- 1987 – Den demokratiske terroristen
- 1988 – I nationens intresse
- 1989 – Fiendens fiende
- 1990 – Den hedervärde mördaren
- 1991 – Vendetta
- 1992 – Ingen mans land
- 1993 – Den enda segern
- 1994 – I hennes majestäts tjänst
- 1995 – En medborgare höjd över varje misstanke
- 2006 – Madame Terror
- 2008 – Men inte om det gäller din dotter

=== Other appearances ===
- 1995 – Hamlon (novella)
- 2018 – De som dödar drömmar sover aldrig
- 2019 – Den andra dödssynden

== Concept and creation ==
While working as a journalist in the early 1970s Jan Guillou had been convicted of espionage for exposing an illegal secret spy organization inside the Swedish military (see the IB affair). During his prison sentence in 1974, he read the crime novels about Martin Beck, written by his friends and fellow left wing writers Per Wahlöö and Maj Sjöwall, and this inspired him to write his own political crime novels. But instead of writing about the police he would write about the world of intelligence and counter-intelligence from the viewpoint of a Swedish spy, making use of his vast research and journalistic experience in this field.

Guillou had published his debut novel "Om kriget kommer" (If the War Comes) in 1971, some years before the IB affair, where the main character is also an officer in the Swedish military intelligence. But he didn't begin writing on the new spy project until the mid-1980s, when a personal encounter with Norwegian security police in Oslo inspired him to the plot of the first novel. Many years after the IB affair, Guillou had also befriended the former chief of the Swedish military intelligence, who came to serve as a sounding board for the plot of the novels and be the inspiration for the character of the retired spy chief DG.

The inspiration for the main character Carl Hamilton was a left wing speaker that Guillou had seen giving a speech during a political manifestation in Stockholm in the late 1960s. This person was named Oxenstierna, an old name from Swedish nobility, and was referred to as 'Comrade Oxenstierna' during the manifestation, which greatly amused Guillou since he found the idea of a Swedish Count who was also a Socialist to be very entertaining. The reason he changed the name to Hamilton, another old name from the nobility, was because there were so few living people from the family of Oxenstierna and Hamilton was more common and easier to use anonymously.

== Writing style ==
Jan Guillou uses an intended journalistic style for his prose, making the series serve as a contemporary chronicle for Sweden and the end of the Cold War. Each novel in the series has its intended political theme, often depicting the use of un-democratic methods to protect democracy.

Several characters in the books are based on actual people, often slightly disguised. For example, real life Swedish spy Stig Bergling becomes 'Stig Sandström' and real life intelligence chief Ulf Samuelsson becomes 'Samuel Ulfsson'. Many real life politicians feature such as Carl Bildt, Yasser Arafat and Mikhail Gorbachev. Jan Guillou himself is the basis of a character named Erik Ponti, which was the alter ego he used in his autobiographical novel Ondskan from 1981 (literal translation: The Evil).

== The character of Carl Hamilton ==
=== Early life ===
As a teenager from the Swedish upper class in Stockholm, Hamilton was an active member of the intellectual Maoist organisation Clarté and pro-Palestine groups. When entering Sweden's compulsory military service as an attack diver for the Navy, his political intent was to infiltrate the system in order to strengthen it against the threat of Soviet imperialism and at the same time reduce the traditionally right wing tendencies of the armed forces. While being trained by the Navy, at 22 years old, he is recruited by the spy chief DG ("The Old One"), with an offer to become a new kind of secret field operator for military intelligence. Instead of attending the Swedish Naval Academy, Hamilton is sent to the US to be secretly trained by the CIA and the Navy SEALs. The cover story for his additional time in the USA was that Hamilton was studying computers at University of California, San Diego. He spent five years in California, completing both college and his secret military and intelligence training in the Mojave Desert. He returned to Sweden in 1981.

A young version of Hamilton also makes brief appearances in the novels De som dödar drömmar sover aldrig (2018) and Den andra dödssynden (2019) that takes place in the 1970s and 1980s.

=== Career ===
At the beginning of the first novel, Coq Rouge (1986), Hamilton has been misplaced to a desk job at the Swedish security service, SÄPO. Because of changed political policies and military union rules, and not least his radical past, his old mentor and recruiter DG has not been able to get him into the military intelligence as was intended. Only after the events in the second novel does he actually get to join the military intelligence, called OP5, after having proved his superior skills in the field. As a secret field operator he is used to gather intelligence, infiltrate, lead rescue operations and commit assassinations. After his cover has been blown in the fourth novel, Fiendens fiende, he is often used for political PR purposes and becomes internationally famous, even named Time Person of the Year.

When he first starts making a name for himself in the secret world of spies, during the events of the first novel, he is given the international codename Coq Rouge, which has been used as a title of the main series. This codename is ironically derived from a conversation between Näslund, his chief at the Swedish security service, and an Israeli counterpart during a meeting between security officers in France. Näslund, who hates Hamilton, says that Hamilton is as proud as a rooster and a communist. During the conversation, they are drinking wine from a bottle with a red coq on the bottle, and the Israeli officer says: "Why don't we call him the red rooster, "Coq Rouge?". The real codename that Hamilton himself uses with his military colleagues is Trident.

Hamilton works for many years in the Swedish military intelligence until he is appointed chief of the Swedish security service in the tenth novel, En medborgare höjd över varje misstanke (1995).

Ten years after conclusion of the main series with the tenth novel, Hamilton makes an unexpected return in the novel Madame Terror (2006), as the commander of a Palestinian submarine with a mission to destroy the Israeli navy. Guillou had stated in 1995 that the series had ended and could not continue. However, when he was working on Madame Terror, he realised that he needed Hamilton to fill in a specific role for the plot to work. After that, Hamilton makes yet another appearance in the novel Men inte om det gäller din dotter (2008), where he is again forced to take up arms.

=== Personal traits ===
From his conservative upperclass upbringing, Hamilton has a great interest in wine and classical music. In the first few novels, he lives in an apartment in the Old Town of central Stockholm. Later in the series, he moves to a castle outside Stockholm. As a teenager he was a Communist, while as an adult he considers himself a Socialist.

Before he went to the USA he inherited shares, and when returning this has made him a millionaire on the stock market. Since he has always despised economy built on speculation, he moves his money to funds and property, which to his disliking makes him even richer.

When Hamilton wears his Swedish Naval uniform he wears the insignia of the Navy SEALs, and during the series he is awarded a collection of medals and military decorations.

His preferred weapons are a Beretta 92 (pistol) and a Smith & Wesson Combat Magnum (revolver). He owns a Beretta pistol with a grip in nacre, inscribed with the family weapon of house Hamilton, which he got as a parting gift from his American instructors in California.

He has no fear of darkness, harbouring a well-grounded conviction that because of his superior military training he is the thing to fear in the night. Since a young age he has a particular talent for sharpshooting, which comes to be his personal method for self-meditation. No matter how chaotic his emotional or physical situation, he becomes calm when aiming a gun, "blanking out everything except the line between eye, sight and target".

Throughout the series, he becomes increasingly tormented and troubled by his work experience, and sometimes visualizes his inner demons as "blocks of black ice surfacing in a raging river", and routinely suppresses them. In the early books, his mentor DG, who is a trained psychologist as well as a military officer, acts as his sounding board.

=== Medals and decorations ===
- Marinens skyttemedalj
- För tapperhet i fält (Gustav III:s)
- Commander of the Bundesverdienstkreuz
- Commander of the Legion of Honour
- För tapperhet i fält (Gustaf V:s)
- H. M. The King's Medal 8th size by the Order of the Seraphim ribbon
- Order of the Red Star
- Time Person of the Year
- Grand Cross of the Legion of Honour

== Plot ==
=== Coq Rouge (1986) ===

Original Swedish title: Coq Rouge: berättelsen om en svensk spion (literal: Coq Rouge – the Story of a Swedish Spy)

In the mid-1980s, a high-ranking officer in the Swedish security service, SÄPO, is found murdered in Stockholm. Together with the policemen of the security service, the young Carl Hamilton is tasked with investigating the murder and soon makes use of his secret military training. The conservative Swedish police put their main focus on Palestinians and left wing radicals, but when the investigation takes Hamilton to Beirut and Israel he finds a different truth.

=== Den demokratiske terroristen (1987) ===

The Democratic Terrorist

The West German security service has need of a Swedish colleague to help them infiltrate a remaining group of the Red Army Faction (RAF) that is supposedly planning a terrorist operation in Sweden. Carl Hamilton is the best choice with his military training and radical background in the leftist movement.

=== I nationens intresse (1988) ===
In the Interest of the Nation

Hamilton has been transferred to the military intelligence he was intended for. His first mission is to escort a defecting Soviet Admiral from Cairo to Sweden, and soon learns that the Soviet Armed Forces has installed secret underwater bases in the Stockholm archipelago. In the shadow of this great threat to the nation, Hamilton is tormented by guilt from a brutal event that his intense military training has caused in his private life.

=== Enemy's Enemy (1989) ===
Original Swedish title: Fiendens fiende. English translation by Thomas Keeland in 1992.

A Soviet defector in London feeds the Swedish security service information that Hamilton is a double agent working for Russia. Much of this information seems to come from another Swedish double agent, who has recently escaped Swedish prison and is now guarded by the Russians in Moscow. This leads to the disturbing question if the Swedish military intelligence can conduct a secret murder on one of their own citizens.

=== Den hedervärde mördaren (1990) ===
The Honourable Murderer

Retired high-ranking Swedish officers are being brutally murdered, and the murderers are leaving traces to a supposed Nazi past. While Sweden is in turmoil from racist movements, Hamilton and his colleagues in the military intelligence are tasked to conduct their own investigation of the murders, searching the military archives and learning the dark past of their predecessors.

=== Vendetta (1991) ===
Vendetta

When members of the Swedish arms industry are kidnapped by the Italian mafia in Sicily, Hamilton is tasked to handle the negotiations. He brings one of his closest friends and military colleagues for the mission, and after a deadly first encounter with the mafia, he is thrown into a vicious vendetta where all of his military training is put to use.

=== Ingen mans land (1992) ===
No Man's Land

Hamilton and the Swedish military intelligence are tasked with preventing stolen nuclear warheads from being smuggled out of Russia, resulting in a secret military operation across the Russian border with a very dark and very disturbing mission.

=== Den enda segern (1993) ===
The Only Victory

As a sequel to the previous novel, a second nuclear warhead has been smuggled out through Sweden, revealing that the first deadly attempt was meant only as a sinister distraction. Hamilton, who is tormented by his deeds during that mission, must now work with former enemies in the Russian military intelligence to track the second warhead and the people who stole it, and to prevent a war he must also try to bring the new conservative government in Sweden and the US military into a collaboration with his old friends in the PLO.

=== I hennes majestäts tjänst (1994) ===
On Her Majesty's Service

The British MI5 and MI6 need the assistance of Hamilton and his unit within the Swedish military intelligence to investigate a growing number of mysterious deaths in the British defence industry. Meanwhile, hateful enemies from Hamilton's own past are planning a sinister revenge.

=== En medborgare höjd över varje misstanke (1995) ===
A Citizen Raised Above Every Suspicion

With his private life in ashes, Hamilton is appointed head of the Swedish security service and begins an effort to reshape the organization. While he is doing a lecture tour of Sweden's universities, several immigrant agents of the security service are being murdered with military skill.

=== Hamlon (novella) (1995) ===
After escaping from Sweden, convicted of murder, Hamilton is now living a secret life as a retired rich man in La Jolla, California, with the name Charles Hamlon under the protection of the FBI. When a local murder investigation makes the FBI search for a suspect with elite military skills, Hamlon is taken into consideration.

This novella is written as a draft for an eleventh novel, but the plot was never intended to be solved and it ends with an afterword where Jan Guillou accounts for why the series would not continue. Guillou states that En medborgare höjd över varje misstanke was the last book and the conclusion of the series, and in order to make sure that Hamilton would never return he was now "banished" from Sweden through a life sentence and eternal exile in California. Since Guillou only intended to write with clear political themes, based around Sweden, no further books would be possible.

=== Madame Terror (2006) ===
Carl Hamilton has spent ten years in secret exile as Charles Hamlon in California, where he is keeping his body in shape and getting psychological help. One day an old friend from the Palestinian intelligence service, Mouna al-Husseini who the world presumed dead, comes to recruit him for a mission. With the help of the Russians, who want revenge on the Americans for sinking the Kursk submarine, the Palestinians have developed a high-tech alfa class attack submarine. The crew is mixed Russian and Palestinian, but they have trouble collaborating. They need a strong leader that is neither Russian nor Palestinian, but who can speak Russian, supports the Palestinian cause, has Russian and Palestinian medals, has naval background, understands the strategies of war and is a high-ranking officer. Only one living man fits this description: Carl Hamilton. Their mission is to destroy the entire Israeli fleet.

=== Men inte om det gäller din dotter (2008) ===
But Not If it Concerns Your Daughter

After leading the Palestinians to a short-lived victory against Israel, Hamilton is exiled to Russia since the Americans under the George W. Bush regime has declared him an enemy and a terrorist. When he can no longer stay in Russian, after having refused a demand from president Vladimir Putin to become a commander of brutal Russian military operations, he returns to Stockholm in order to have his old murder conviction reconsidered in court. Acquitted, he begins a new retired life in the company of new and old friends, but when a small child is kidnapped by Saudi Arabian terrorists he must once again take up arms and lead another military operation.

== Film and TV adaptations ==
- Codename Coq Rouge, portrayed by Stellan Skarsgård (1989)
- Förhöret, portrayed by Stellan Skarsgård (television, 1989) (English translation: The interrogation)
- Enemy's Enemy, portrayed by Peter Haber (television miniseries 1990)
- The Democratic Terrorist, portrayed by Stellan Skarsgård (1992)
- Vendetta, portrayed by Stefan Sauk (1995)
- Tribunal, portrayed by Stefan Sauk (television, 1995)
- Hamilton, portrayed by Peter Stormare (1998, television miniseries 2001)
- Hamilton: In the Interest of the Nation (Hamilton: I nationens intresse), portrayed by Mikael Persbrandt (2012)
- Agent Hamilton: But Not If It Concerns Your Daughter (Hamilton 2: Men inte om det gäller din dotter) (2012)
- Agent Hamilton: In Her Majesty's Service (Hamilton 3: I hennes majestäts tjänst) (2016)
- Agent Hamilton (TV series), with Jakob Oftebro (2019)

The Carl Hamilton who appears in the movies and TV series made between 1989 and 1998 (Stellan Skarsgård, Peter Haber, Stefan Sauk and Peter Stormare) is based on the novels, with minor changes.

The Carl Hamilton who appears in the movies Hamilton – I nationens intresse (2011) and Hamilton – Men inte om det gäller din dotter (2012), played by Mikael Persbrandt, is only loosely based on the character from the novels and does not follow the original story line or setting, and is mostly a new character moved into the 2010s.

The Carl Hamilton who appears in the TV series Hamilton (2020), played by Jakob Oftebro, is a younger version moved to the 2020s, with very little resemblance to the original novels.
