= Oran International Arabic Film Festival =

Arabic film festival held in Oran, Algeria

- Locations: Oran, Algeria
- Founded: 1976
- Website: http://oranfestival.com

The Oran International Arabic Film Festival (Oiaff) (Arabic: مهرجان وهران الدولي للفيلم العربي) is a recurring film festival, held in Oran.

The 2012 top award went to the film Coming Forth by Day by Hala Lotfi.

== Participating countries ==
Country	Movie Title	Director	Date Display
People's Democratic Republic of Algeria	Mustapha Ben Boulaid	Ahmed Rashidi	Monday 28-07-2009
	Trip to Algeria	Abdelkrim Bahloul	
	Masquerades	Lyes Salem	
United Arab Emirates	Elda-ira	Nawaf Al-Janahi	

== 2010 ==
In 2010 the festival took place between 16 December to 23 December in Oran.

== Participating countries ==
Country	Movie Title	Director	Date Display
People's Democratic Republic of Algeria	العابر الأخير - el-abir el-akhir	mounes khammar	21-12-2010
	خويا - khouya	Yaniss Koussim	21-12-2010
	قراقوز - garagouz	abdenour zahzah	22-12-2010
	الساحة - el-saha	dahman ouzid	22-12-2010
	طاكسيفون - taxiphone	mohamed soudani	22-12-2010
United Arab Emirates	صولو - solo	amine el djabiri	17-12-2010
	ثوب الشمس - thaoub el chems	said salemine	19-12-2010
	سبيل - sabeel	khaled el mahmoud	21-12-2010
