= Agent Hamilton: But Not If It Concerns Your Daughter =

- Film poster
- Directed by: Tobias Falk
- Written by: Stefan Thunberg
- Based on: Men inte om det gäller din dotter by Jan Guillou
- Produced by: Jan Marnell
- Starring: Mikael Persbrandt; Frida Hallgren; Steven Waddington; John Light; Saba Mubarak
- Cinematography: Jan Jonaeus
- Edited by: Thomas Lagerman
- Music by: Philippe Boix-Vives; Jon Ekstrand
- Distributed by: Buena Vista International (Sweden); SF International Sales (International)
- Release date: September 7, 2012
- Running time: 90 minutes
- Country: Sweden
- Languages: Swedish; English

Agent Hamilton: But Not If It Concerns Your Daughter, also called Hamilton 2: Unless It's About Your Daughter, is a 2012 spy film directed by Tobias Falk. It is the second part of a planned trilogy. Mikael Persbrandt and Saba Mubarak reprise their roles as agent Carl Hamilton and agent Mouna al Fathar.

== Plot ==
Eva Tanguy is the mother of Carl Hamilton's goddaughter Nathalie and the director of the Swedish Security Service. When she confounds a terroristic assassination on Swedish soil, the assassin is unfortunately killed in her presence. This draws more attention to her person than ever but she sticks to her previous promise to give an interview for a big newspaper. The journalists twist her words in a way that provokes Islamists. As a result, Nathalie gets kidnapped. She is filming with her smartphone when this happens and this provides a trace for Hamilton. Soon he realises the kidnappers were mercenaries with a SAS background. His investigation leads him to the United Kingdom where he tries to retrieve information from one of their old SAS comrades who is evidently unwilling to fill in an outsider. He attempts to put Hamilton down and dies trying. Hamilton is then arrested and delivered to the SIS Building where he faces being interrogated by high-ranked MI-6 officials. After his release he learns he mustn't even rely on his own country's secret service when he wants to rescue his goddaughter. As soon as he knows where Nathalie is kept, he asks Mouna al Fathar to help him. She demands that the leader of these Islamists will also be deducted because the PLO wants him brought before an international court. Together with Nathalie's father, a former member of the French Foreign Legion, they raid the terrorist's garrison. But Pierre Tanguy is out of shape and the terrorist leader is of all things secretly supported by a US-American who plays all sides. Hamilton gets caught and becomes subject to torture during interrogation.

== Cast ==
- Mikael Persbrandt as Carl Hamilton
- Saba Mubarak as Mouna al Fathar
- Frida Hallgren as Eva Tanguy
- Reuben Sallmander as Pierre Tanguy
- Lennart Hjulström as DG
- Peter Eggers as Patrik Wärnstrand
- Steven Waddington as McCullen
- John Light as Jason Fox
- Sven Ahlström as Cedervall
- Said Legue as Suleiman Al-Obeid
- Maria Langhammer as Helene Boström

== Reception ==
The film was panned by Swedish critics. Both Aftonbladet and Expressen rated it 1 out of 5. The Swedish film website MovieZine described that "most of it leaves much/everything to be desired". SVT called it "A insult to the thinking man".

== Home media release ==
The Australian DVD contains only one version. It is the original version which is partly in English and otherwise subtitled.
