= Allaith Hajjo =

Syrian film director

- Born: 1971 (age 54–55); Syria
- Occupation: Film director
- Years active: 1971 – Till Date
- Notable work: THE CORD
- Website: allaithhajjo.net

Allaith Hajjo (Arabic: الليث حجو; born 1971) is a Syrian film director. He is best known for the films like "THE CORD", which won first place in The Hague. He is the son of the actor Omar Hajjo. He began his career as an assistant director until he made his first television series Spotlight 2001.

== Early life and career ==
Al-Layth Hajjo was born in Damascus in 1971. He started his career as an assistant director where he worked with a number of Syrian directors such as Hatem Ali, Mamoun Al-Bunni, and Hisham Sharbatji.

In 2001, he directed his first drama, Spotlight (2001–05) which was an instant hit that ran for six seasons; likewise The Lovers (2008–16) and Dayaa Dayaa (A Lost Village 2008–10), with three and two seasons, respectively.

In 2011, he directed a documentary film entitled Nawfez Al- Rouh "Windows of the Soul" with the participation of Ammar Al-Ani, a co-production between the General Film Organization and the Directorate of Antiquities and Museums, in cooperation with the Roots Foundation.

Hajjo directed some of the most popular television series in the region, such as "Al Antezar (2006)", "dayaa-dayaa (2007 & 2010)", "Al-Nadam (2016), "Al-Khirbeh (2011)", Masafat Aman (2019) and "Awlad Adam (2020)".

In 2018, he made a short film, The Cord, written by Ramy Koussa, which premiered at the second El Gouna Film Festival in 2019 and won a number of awards.

== Filmography ==
=== As a co-director ===
==== Series ====
- Maraya (1996)
- Khan Al Harir 1 (1996)
- Safar (TV Series) (1997)
- Al-Thuraya (1998)
- Maraya (1999)
- The Four Seasons 1 (1999)
- Maraya (2000)
- The Four Seasons 2 (2001)
- Impoliteness and a lot of predominance (2001),
- The Roots Remain Green (2002)

=== As a director ===
Al-Layth Hajjo has many works. He directed many series, films, and video clips.

==== Series ====
- Bokaat Daww (Spotlight) (2001)
- Bokaat Daww (Spotlight) (2002)
- Almakshouf (2003)
- Bokaat Daww (Spotlight) (2004)
- Ahel Al-Gharam (2006)
- Al Antezar (2006)
- De'ah Da'iah or dayaa-dayaa (2007) (en:A lost village)
- Fenjan El Dam (2008)
- De'ah Da'iah (2010) or dayaa-dayaa Second Season,
- Takhatoo khater (2010),
- Al-Khirbeh (2011)
- Arwah Ariah (Naked Souls) (2012)
- Sanaoud baad khalil (We'll be back Soon) (2013)
- Laabt Al-Mout (The Game of Death) (2013)
- Al Hakhaab (2014)
- 24 karat (2015)
- Al-Nadam (Regret) (2016)
- Al-Waq Waq (2018)
- Masafat Aman (A Safe Distance) (2019)
- Souq Al Demaa (The Blood Market) (2019)
- Awlad Adam (Adam's Children) (2020)
- Safar Barlik (2023)
- Resalet Al Imam (2023)

==== Film ====
- The Cord (2018)

==== Documentary ====
- Nawafez Al- Rouh (Windows of the Spirit) (2011)

== Awards ==
- Audience Award at the MENA Short Film Festival in its second session
- Nominated in El Gouna Film Festival in 2019
