= Basil Al-Khatib =

Palestinian Syrian director

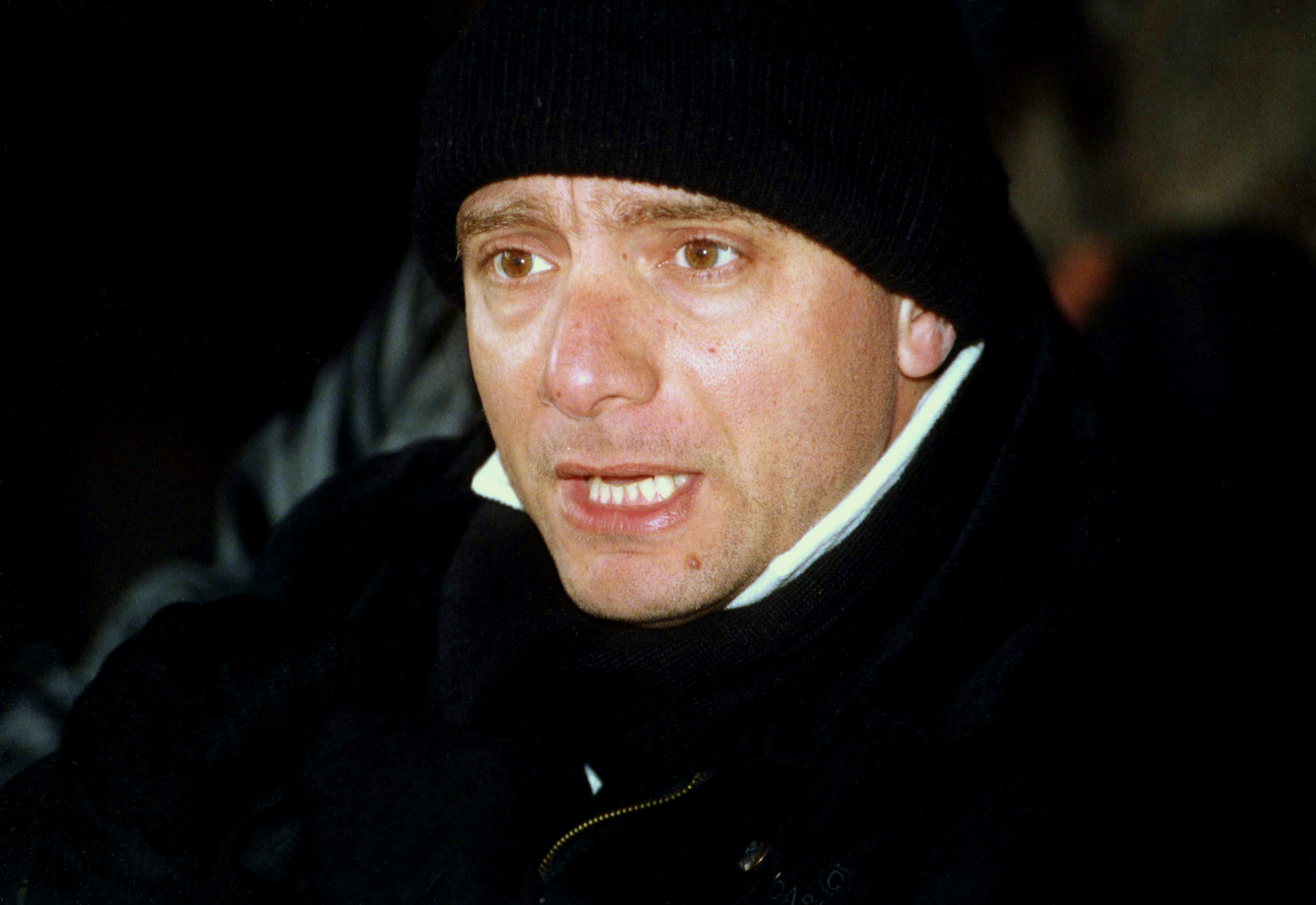
Basil Al-Khatib

Basil Al-Khatib (Arabic: باسل الخطيب) is a Syrian movie and TV director, from a Palestinian origin. He was born on 6 May 1962 in Hilversum, the Netherlands. He has lived with his family in Damascus, Syria since 1963. His father is the Palestinian poet Yousif Al-Khatib.

Basil is married to Diana Gabbour, a director of the Arab Syrian TV. He was a graduate of the Department of the Film & TV Direction, The Moscow Higher Institute of Cinema (VGIK). Basil was working in cinema and television drama since 1992.

== List of television series and movies as a director ==
- Yomein / Two Days (2024 movie)
- Damascus Aleppo (2018 movie) TBR 28 FEBRUARY 2018
- The Father
- The Mother (2015 movie)
- Mariam (2013)
- Al Ghaliboun (2011-2012 TV series)
- Nasser (2008 TV series)
- Abo Zaid Al-Helaly (2005 TV series)
- Mawkib Al-Ebaa' (2005 movie)
- Nizar Qabbani (2005 TV series)
- Returning to Haifa (2004 TV series)
- Holako (2002 TV series)
- Zy Qar (2001 TV series)
- Al-Risala Al-Akhira (2000 movie)
- Jalila (1993 movie)
