= Auvergne =

Auvergne Auvèrnhe / Auvèrnha (Occitan)
- Cultural region
- Flag Coat of arms

- Location of Auvergne in France
- Coordinates: 45°20′N 3°00′E
- Country: France

Area
  - Total: 26,013 km^{2} (10,044 sq mi)

Population
  - Total: 1,362,367
  - Density: 52.373/km^{2} (135.64/sq mi)

GDP
  - Total: €47,249 billion (2024)
  - Per capita: €34,539 (2024)
- Time zone: UTC+1 (CET)
  - Summer (DST): UTC+2 (CEST)

Auvergne (/oʊˈvɛərn(jə), oʊˈvɜːrn/; French: [ovɛʁɲ]; Occitan: Auvèrnhe or Auvèrnha) is a cultural region in central France. It is now largely part of the Auvergne-Rhône-Alpes administrative region.

Auvergne is generally regarded as conterminous with the land area of the historical Province of Auvergne, which was dissolved in 1790, and with the now-defunct administrative region of Auvergne, which existed from 1956 to 2015.

The region is home to a chain of volcanoes known collectively as the "chaîne des Puys". The volcanoes began forming about 70,000 years ago, and most have eroded, leaving plugs of hardened magma that form rounded hilltops known as puys. The last confirmed eruption occurred around 4040 BCE.

== Geography ==
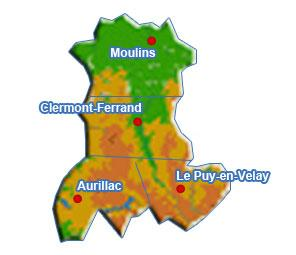
Auvergne terrain map

Auvergne is known for its mountain ranges and dormant volcanoes. Together the Monts Dore and the Chaîne des Puys include 80 volcanoes. The Puy de Dôme is the highest volcano in the region, with an altitude of 1,465 metres (4,806 ft). The Sancy Massif in the Monts Dore is the highest point in Auvergne at 1,886 metres (6,188 ft).

The northern part is covered in hills, while the southern portion is mountainous and dotted with pastures. The Forest of Tronçais covers nearly 11,000 hectares (27,000 acres) and is the largest oak forest in Europe.

Auvergne has two major rivers: the Loire runs through the southeast and borders the northeast, and the Allier runs from north to south down the center of Auvergne, with branches going east and west.

Auvergne has about 50 freshwater ponds and lakes. Some are high in the mountains and have volcanic origins. Lac de Guéry is the highest lake in Auvergne.

== Gallery ==
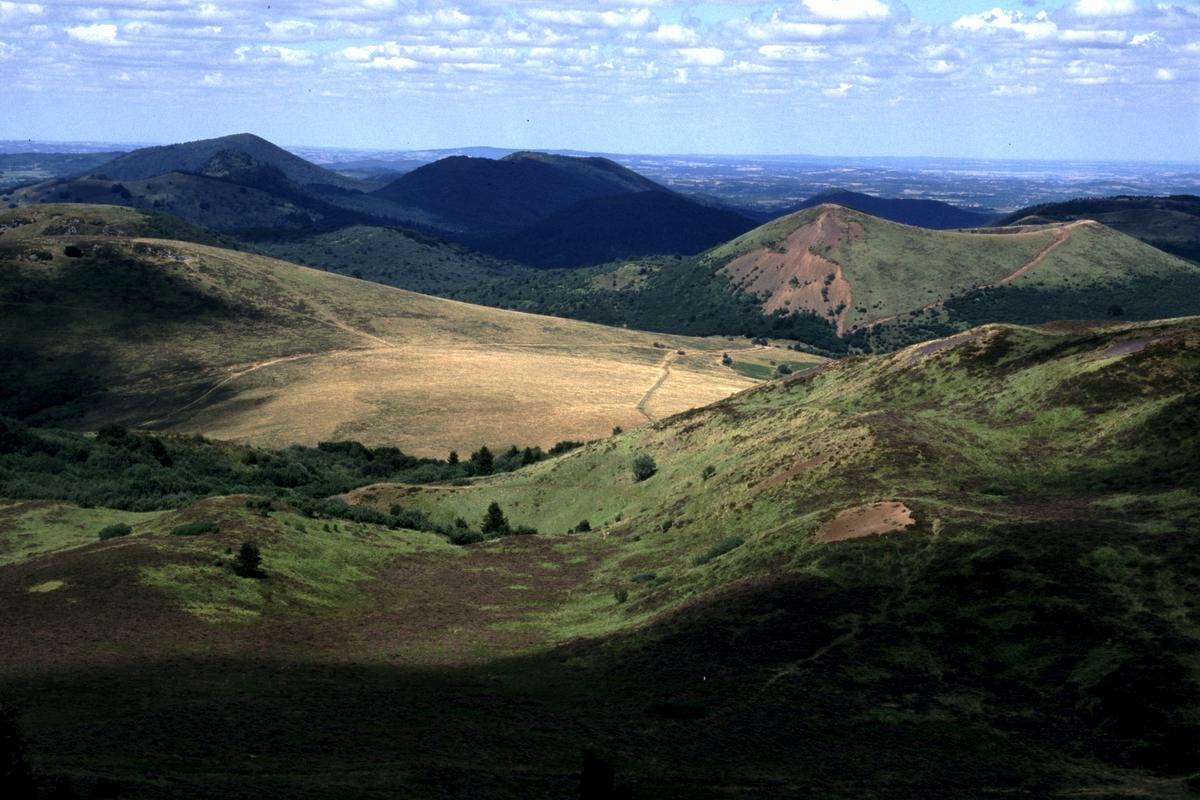
Volcanoes.

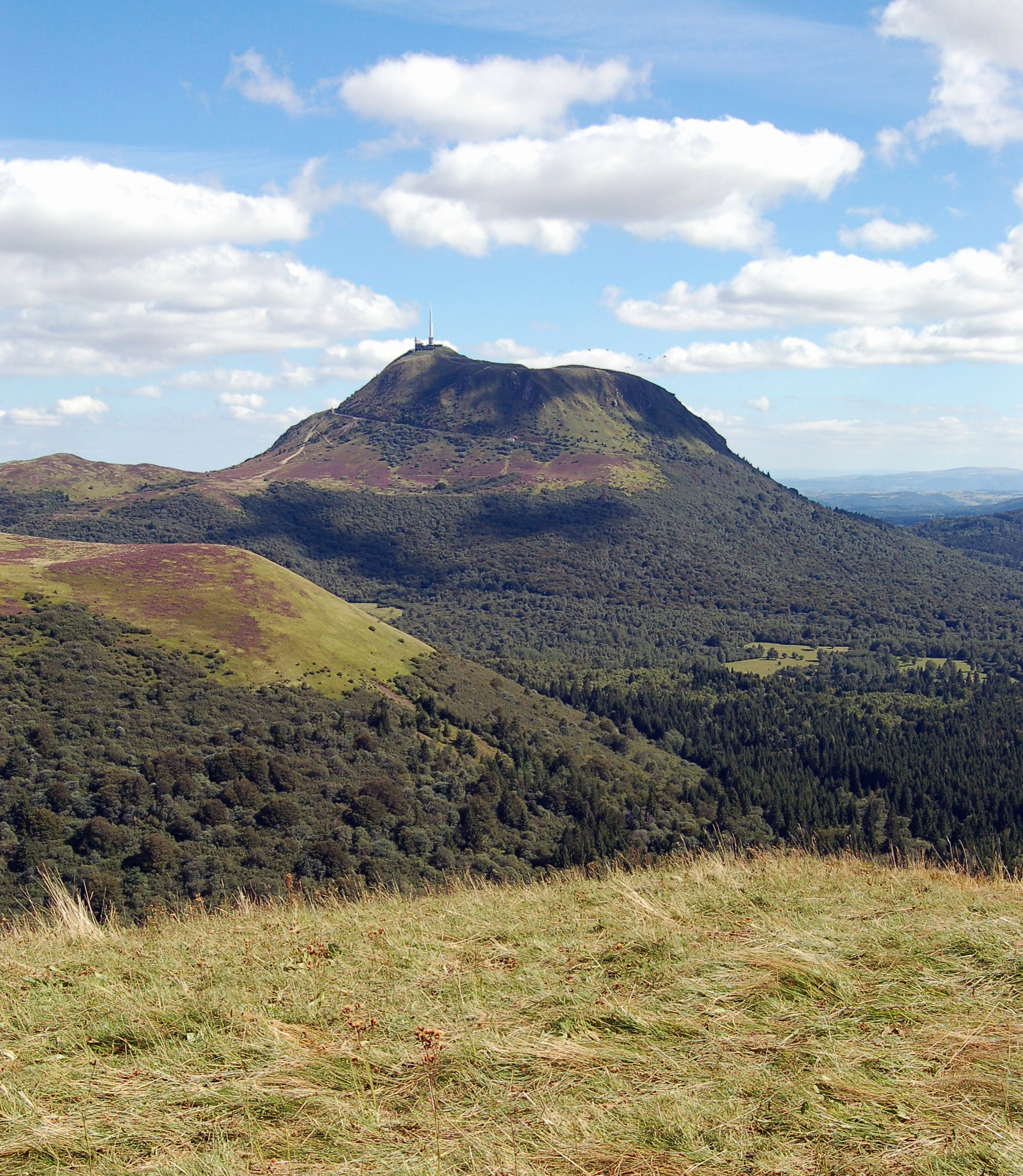
Puy de Dôme.

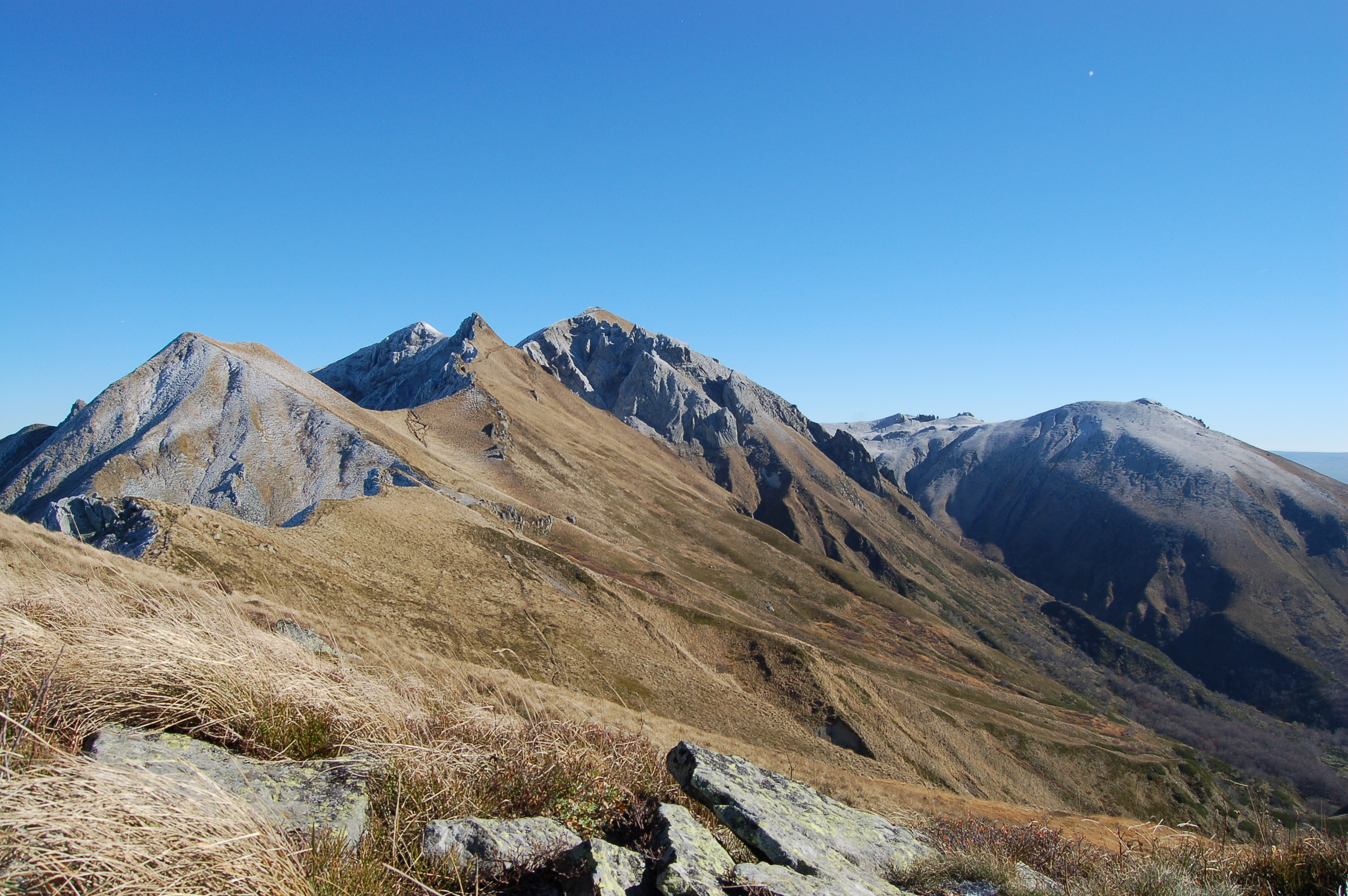
Puy du Sancy.

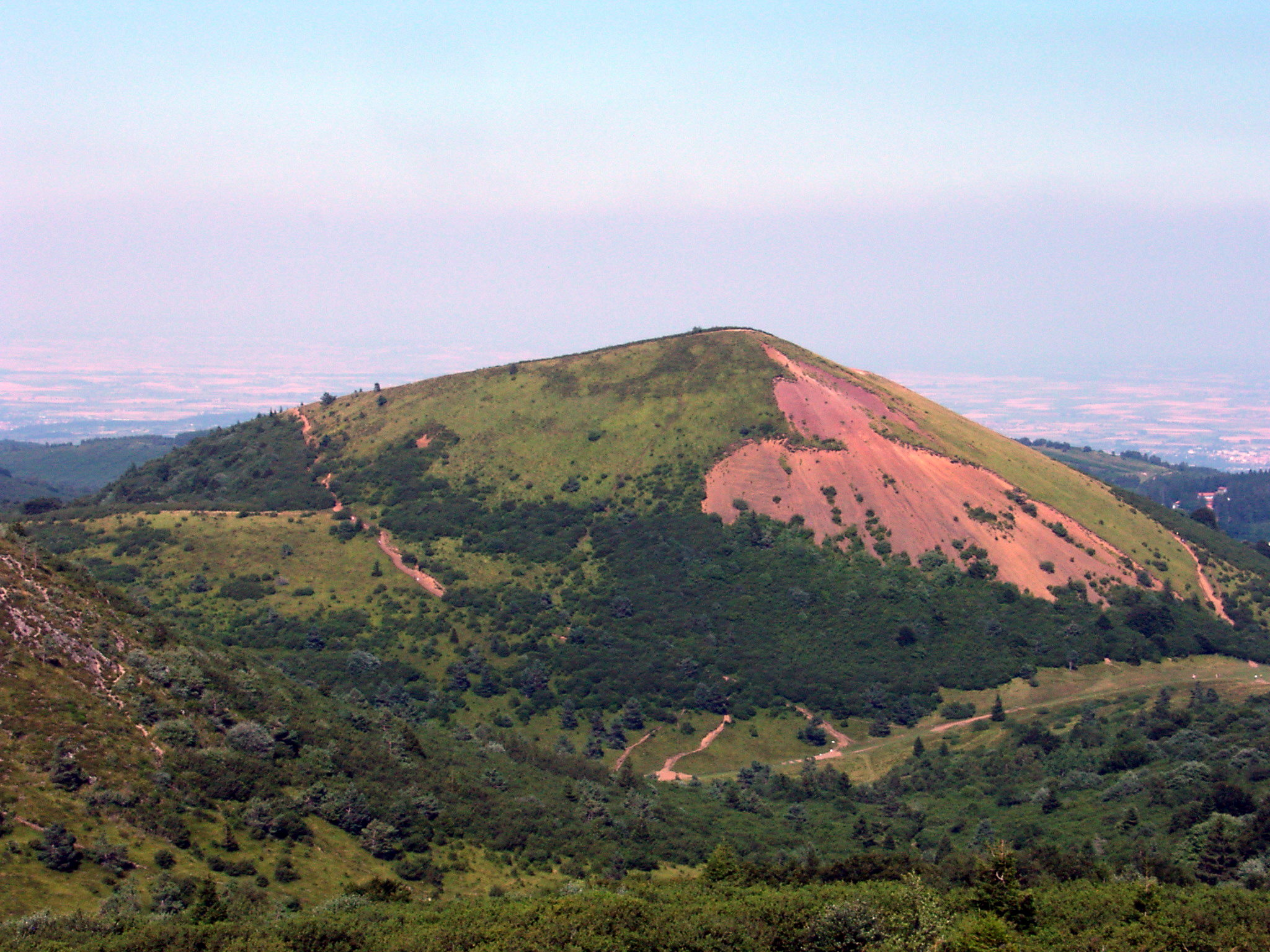
Puy Pariou.

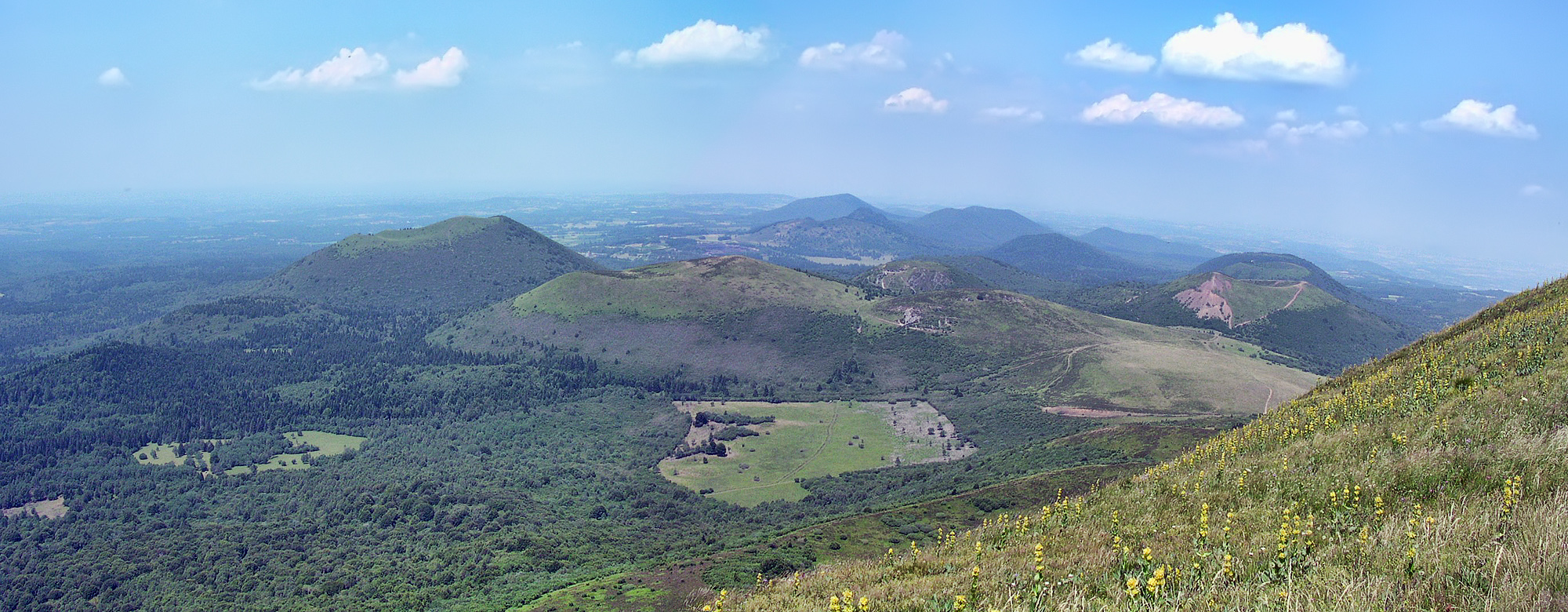
The "Chaîne des Puys" in Puy-de-Dôme

== Climate ==
The average annual temperature is 12 °C (54 °F), and the region receives 510 to 1,020 mm (20 to 40 in) of rainfall annually.

There are long winters and short summers.

== History ==
=== Land of the Arverni ===
The region of Auvergne was named after the Arverni, one of the most powerful Gallic tribes. It was composed of the Gabali, the Vellavi, and the Cadurci, whose sphere of influence included the regions of Languedoc and Aquitaine. Vercingetorix became their king in 52 BC. His father and predecessor, Celtillos, had been killed by his companions who opposed Celtillos' goal of making the title hereditary.

In the winter of 53/52 BC, Vercingetorix created alliances with all the Celtic tribes surrounding him by holding as hostages daughters or sons of the kings of each tribe. With this threat, he gained their guarantees of faithfulness and alliance. Based on reports in 2007 of excavations by archaeologists (radio programme of Yves Calvi with researchers in October 2007), the capital of the Arverni is believed to have been situated between Gergovie, Corent, Aulnat and several other significant areas within a 35 km (22 mi) range. Researchers estimate a population of 150,000 inhabitants living in the centre of this area, and a total of more than 400,000 inhabitants living in the region of these towns.

The Arverni were one of the most powerful and wealthy tribes in ancient Gaul:

- They were protected by their location in a mountainous area, which provided strong defenses from outside attackers (for example the Cebenna described by Caesar)
- They had resources: numerous mines of gold, silver and other precious metals (exploited at least since 400 BC)
- The uplands had pastures available for grazing of cattle and sheep herds
- Their artisans mastered metalworking and complex craftwork (in Julius Caesar's book on the Gallic Wars, Vercingetorix is described with "a big armor made of many assembled silver pieces, reflecting the sun"), and in particular copperwork
- They minted their own money, and had strong trade with nearby tribes
- They had ceramic manufacture (workshops in Lezoux, etc.)
- They had influence on nearby tribes and were able to rally the Aedui during the revolt of Vercingetorix.

A shrine in Auvergne marks the Battle of Gergovia. Based on scholars' interpretation of books by Caesar, it took place about 12 km (7.5 mi) from present-day Clermont-Ferrand; this has not been conclusively proved. Initially, Vercingetorix and his troops overcame Julius Caesar and the Roman army at Gergovia in 52 BC.

Roman troops subsequently achieved victory at Alesia (Alise-sainte-Reine) in Burgundy. Roman legionaries had set various traps and obstacles to disrupt Gallic advancements. They captured Vercingetorix and took him to Rome, where he was imprisoned. Augustonemetum (as Clermont was known) was developed, probably by displacing a settlement of the Arverni. A recent find is a stone foot, measuring 60 cm (24 in), from a statue 4.5 metres (15 ft) high, probably representing a god or a Roman emperor. In the 5th century, Sidonius Apollinaris, an Arvernian nobleman and first bishop of Clermont, made a statement about the end of the Roman age of the Auvergne.

=== Feudal Auvergne ===
In the 7th century, the Franks and the Aquitani competed for control of Auvergne. Conquered by the Carolingians, it was integrated for a certain time into the kingdom of Aquitania. A section known as the county of Aurillac was given to the father of Géraud d’Aurillac; this grant was made directly by the king. The counts of Auvergne, the Guilhemides, slowly obtained their independence. In the 10th century, Auvergne was subject to rivalry between the counts of Poitiers and Toulouse.

Under the reign of the Carolingians, Auvergne included five secondary counties with a particular administrative system (Clermont, Turluron, Brioude, Tallende, Carlat (comitatus Cartladensis)).

During the Middle Ages, the county of Auvergne covered the current departments of Puy-de-Dôme, the northern half of Cantal, as well as a small third in northwestern Haute-Loire, with the county of Brioude. The other part of Cantal constituted the direct territory of Aurillac Abbey, and a part of it was indentured to the viscounts of Millau, to form the viscountcy of Carlat.

King Philip August linked the majority of the county to the royal territory. The royal territory of Auvergne took Riom as an administrative center. However, Philip August was not able to fully subdue the area: the Count held out in Vic-le-Comte.

In 1226, King Louis VIII's will bequeathed Auvergne as an appanage to his younger son, Alphonse, Count of Poitiers. In 1360 it was given as a duchy to John, Duke of Berry, who also bought the area of Carlades. His daughter Marie married John I, Duke of Bourbon, who in 1416 also became Duke of Auvergne. The Dukes of Bourbon acquired the Dauphiné of Auvergne through marriage, but in the end all their territories were confiscated by Francis I (1527).

=== Modern times ===
In the 16th century Auvergne was plunged into religious wars. Some Calvinist militia made incursions into the highlands and took castles and Catholic villages by surprise. They returned them, subject to a ransom. Captain Merle in particular, firmly established in nearby Gévaudan, took a ransom from Issoire but failed in Saint Flour. That is how the city of Aurillac had been taken over, and its abbey was completely destroyed.

In the 16th century, Catherine de' Medici, Queen of France, inherited the last part of the county from her mother, which allowed the integration of the last feudal fiefdom, in the heart of Auvergne, into the royal territory.

In 1665, Louis XIV temporarily set up an exceptional criminal court in Clermont and Le Puy-en-Velay, les grands jours d’Auvergne (The Great Days of Auvergne), in response to the complaints of the people, who were victims of violence and abuse by officials and noblemen of Auvergne. During the 18th century, the economic situation of the farmers improved considerably, due to the policies of the Auvergne intendants, who developed farming, cheese manufacturing, agriculture, glasswork, ironwork and roads.

During World War II, Vichy was the headquarters of the government of the French State.

== Demographics ==
Auvergne is an underpopulated area with an aging population. Auvergne is one of the least populated regions in southern Europe, and lies at the heart of the empty diagonal, a swath of sparsely populated territory running from northeastern to southwestern France.

The main communes in Auvergne are (2019 census, municipal population): Clermont-Ferrand (147,865), Montluçon (34,361), Aurillac (25,593), and Vichy (24,980).

== Major communities ==
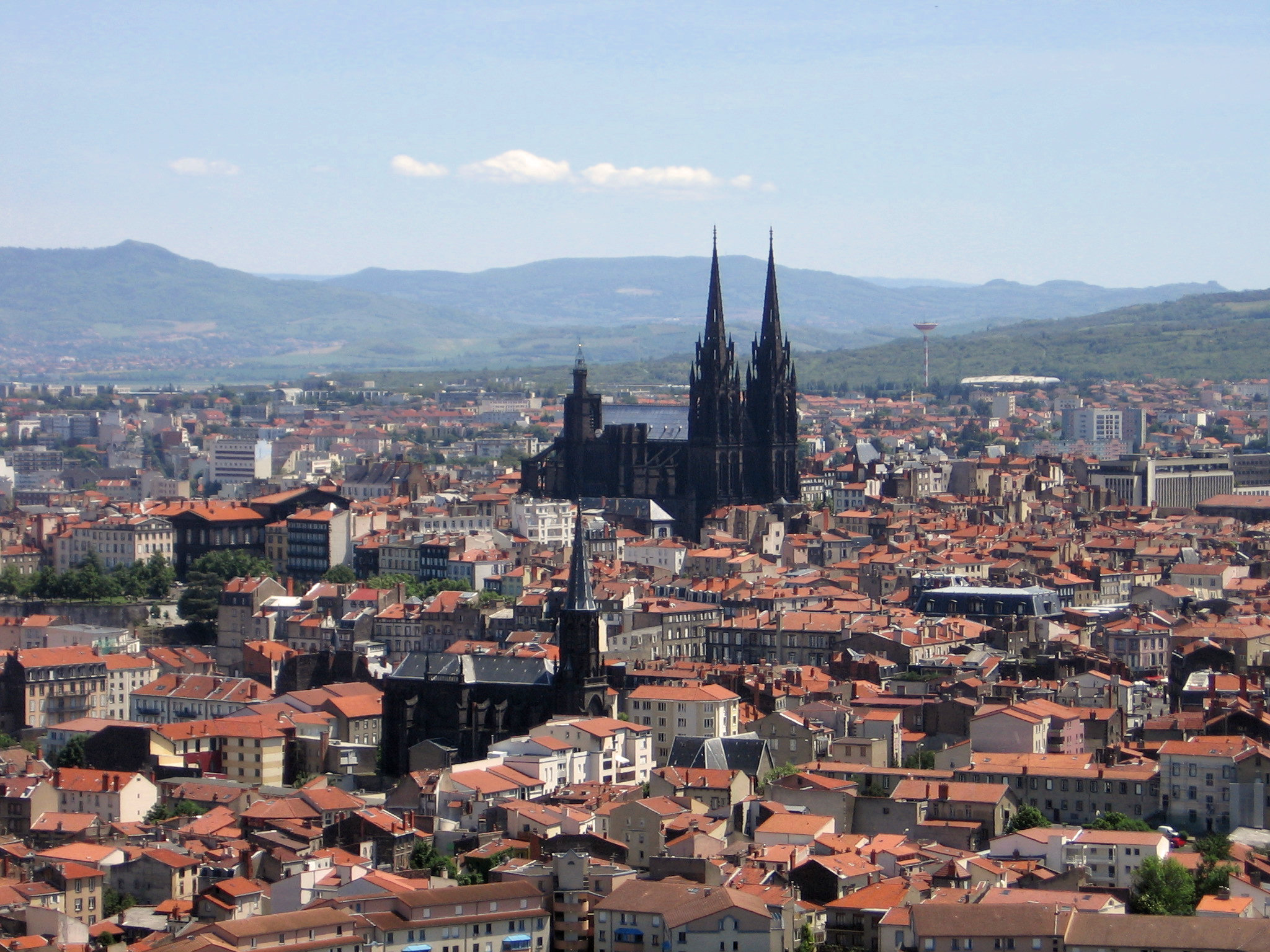
Clermont-Ferrand

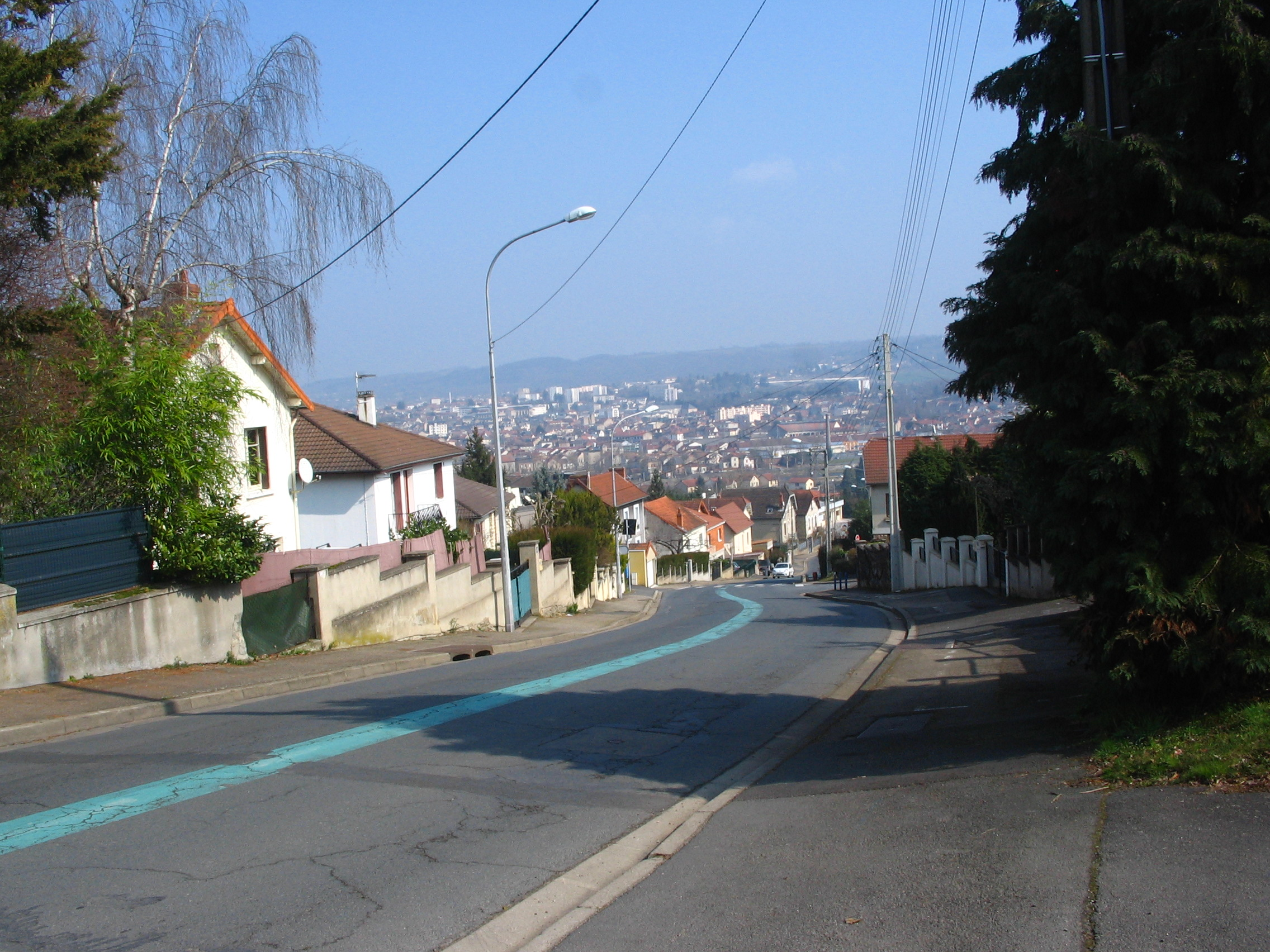
Montluçon

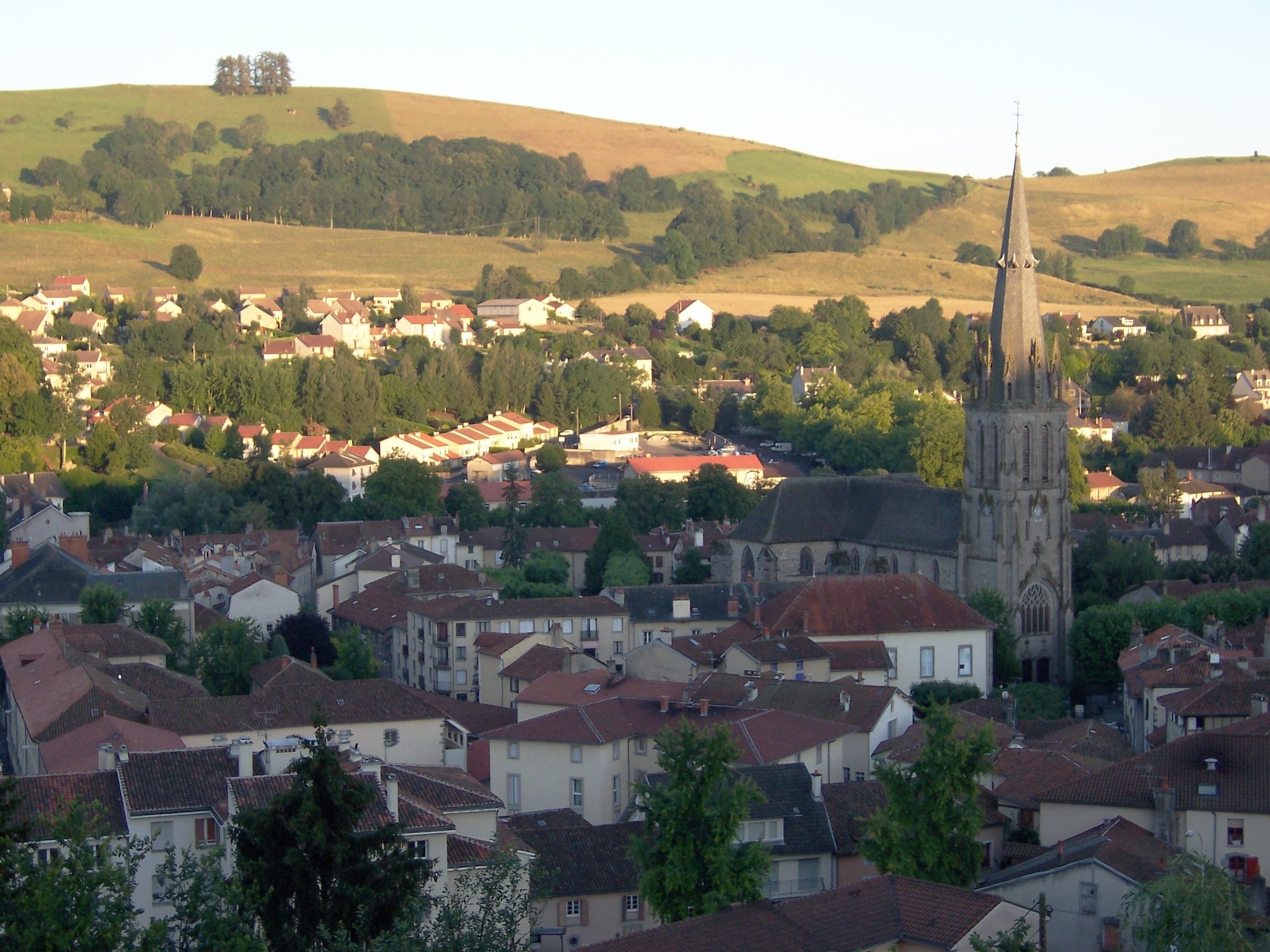
Aurillac

- Aurillac
- Chamalières
- Clermont-Ferrand
- Cournon-d'Auvergne
- Issoire
- Le Puy-en-Velay
- Montluçon
- Moulins, Allier
- Riom
- Vichy
- Thiers, Puy-de-Dôme

== Economy ==
The region is predominantly agricultural, with tourism slowly growing. Both beef and dairy cattle are plentiful, and there are several well-known cheeses: Bleu d'Auvergne, Cantal, Fourme d'Ambert and Saint-Nectaire.

Despite its small local market, the Auvergne region has developed many national and international companies, such as Michelin, Limagrain, the Centre France-La Montagne group, Volvic mineral water and numerous dynamic SMEs around the two universities and high schools (engineering, medical and business) of its capital, Clermont-Ferrand.

Most of these companies export more than 75% of their production.

Auvergne is also a relatively industrial region: the share of the working population in industry is 22% (110,000 jobs), compared to the national average of 18%. The main industry is the tyre industry, represented by Michelin, with its headquarters and history located in Clermont-Ferrand, and Dunlop, based in Montluçon. There is also a diverse range of small industries, particularly in the Puy-de-Dôme and the Haute-Loire: metallurgical (Aubert and Duval), mechanical, pharmaceutical (Merck-Chibret), food—cereals; meat (Salers, Limousin)—as well as cheese.

These include Thiers cutlery, metal Issoire, lace in Le Puy, and livestock as well as food in the Cantal.

The Auvergne is one of the premier research areas in France with more than 8,000 researchers in the fields of chemistry, tires, steel, medical and pharmaceutical sciences in agricultural research (INRA and Limagrain laboratories), in biotechnology, seismology and meteorology.

The food industry, with its branches mineral water, dairy products, meat products, forestry, honey, jams and candied fruit, employs over 12,000 people.

In 2018, the animal theme park Le Pal had 640,000 visitors, making it the most visited theme park in Auvergne-Rhône-Alpes. Le Pal is the fifth most visited amusement park in France and the fourth in the zoo sector.

== In popular culture ==
- Clark Ashton Smith's Averoigne stories are set in a fictionalised version of medieval Auvergne.
- Lestat de Lioncourt from Anne Rice's novel The Vampire Lestat was born and raised in late 18th century Auvergne.
- The 2002 film To Be and to Have (Être et avoir) documents one year in the life of a one-teacher school in rural Saint-Étienne-sur-Usson, Puy-de-Dôme, Auvergne.
- Chants d'Auvergne is a collection of folk songs from the Auvergne region arranged by Joseph Canteloube for soprano solo and orchestra in five series beginning in the 1920s. The original setting uses Auvergnat, the Occitan dialect of the region, but also has been written in modern French.
- Rhapsodie d'Auvergne, Op. 73, is a concerted work for piano and orchestra by Camille Saint-Saëns (1884). It includes a melody that the composer heard while traveling in the region.
- The first verse of Georges Brassens's song "Chanson pour l'Auvergnat" about an Auvergne inhabitant who was the only one to give the hungered protagonist wood so he could warm himself up. (1954)
- The Sorrow and the Pity (French: Le Chagrin et la Pitié) is a two-part 1969 French documentary film by Marcel Ophuls about the collaboration between the Vichy government and Nazi Germany during World War II. The film includes interviews with former German soldiers, collaborators, resistance fighters, and others from the Auvergne region. The interviewees comment on the nature of, and reasons for, collaboration.
