= 36th European Film Awards =

2023 award ceremony

- Logo for Berlin awards
- Date: 9 December 2023
- Site: Berlin, Germany
- Organized by: European Film Academy
- Official website: EFA

The 36th European Film Awards, presented by the European Film Academy to recognize achievements in European filmmaking, took place at Arena Berlin in Berlin on 9 December 2023. It was the twenty-second time that the awards ceremony took place in Germany.

The full list of nominations was revealed on 7 November 2023. Aki Kaurismäki's Fallen Leaves and Jonathan Glazer's The Zone of Interest led the nominations with five each. Justine Triet's Anatomy of a Fall swept the awards, winning in each of the categories it was nominated for, including European Film, European Director, European Screenwriter and European Actress.

== Selections ==
=== Feature films ===
Selection's part 1 was announced on 16 August 2023. 2nd part of the selection was announced on 27 September 2023.

- 20,000 Species of Bees – Estibaliz Urresola Solaguren (Spain)
- Afire – Christian Petzold (Germany)
- Anatomy of a Fall – Justine Triet (France)
- Animal – Sofia Exarchou (Greece, Austria, Bulgaria, Romania, Cyprus)
- The Animal Kingdom – Thomas Cailley (France)
- Behind the Haystacks – Asimina Proedrou (Greece, Germany, North Macedonia)
- Blackbird Blackbird Blackberry – Elene Naveriani (Switzerland, Georgia)
- Blaga's Lessons – Stephan Komandarev (Bulgaria, Germany)
- Close Your Eyes – Victor Erice (Spain, Argentina)
- Club Zero – Jessica Hausner (Austria, UK, Germany, France, Denmark, Qatar)
- Do Not Expect Too Much from the End of the World – Radu Jude (Romania, Luxembourg, France, Croatia)
- Excursion – Una Gunjak (Bosnia and Herzegovina, Croatia, Serbia, France, Norway, Qatar)
- Explanation for Everything – Gábor Reisz (Hungary, Slovakia)
- Fallen Leaves – Aki Kaurismäki (Finland, Germany)
- Femme – Sam H. Freeman, Ng Choon Ping (United Kingdom)
- Firebrand – Karim Aïnouz (United Kingdom)
- The Goldman Case – Cédric Kahn (France)
- Green Border – Agnieszka Holland (Poland, France, Czechia, Belgium)
- The Happiest Man in the World – Teona Strugar Mitevska (North Macedonia, Bosnia and Herzegovina, Belgium, Slovenia, Croatia, Denmark)
- Holly – Fien Troch (Belgium, Luxembourg, Netherlands, France)
- Housekeeping for Beginners – Goran Stolevski (North Macedonia, Croatia, Serbia, Poland, Kosovo)
- How to Have Sex – Molly Manning Walker (United Kingdom, Greece)
- Kidnapped – Marco Bellocchio (Italy, France, Germany)
- La chimera – Alice Rohrwacher (Italy, France, Switzerland)
- Me, Captain – Matteo Garrone (Italy, Belgium)
- The Old Oak – Ken Loach (United Kingdom, France, Belgium)
- Paradise Is Burning – Mika Gustafson (Sweden, Italy, Denmark, Finland)
- The Pot-au-Feu – Tran Anh Hung (France)
- The Promised Land – Nikolaj Arcel (Denmark, Germany, Sweden)
- Safe Place – Juraj Lerotic (Croatia, Slovenia)
- Slow – Marija Kavtaradze (Lithuania, Spain, Sweden)
- Society of the Snow – J. A. Bayona (Spain)
- Stepne – Maryna Vroda (Ukraine, Slovakia, Germany, Poland)
- Sweet Dreams – Ena Sendijarević (Netherlands, Sweden, Indonesia)
- Tatami – Guy Nattiv & Zar Amir Ebrahimi (Georgia, USA)
- The Teachers' Lounge – İlker Çatak (Germany)
- The Universal Theory – Timm Kröger (Germany, Austria, Switzerland)
- The Vanishing Soldier – Dani Rosenberg (Israel)
- Woman Of... – Małgorzata Szumowska & Michał Englert (Poland, Sweden)
- The Zone of Interest – Jonathan Glazer (UK, Poland, USA)

=== Documentary ===
The selection was announced on August 30, 2023.

- Apolonia, Apolonia – Lea Glob (Denmark, Poland)
- Between Revolutions – Vlad Petri (Romania, Croatia)
- Four Daughters – Kaouther Ben Hania (France, Tunisia, Germany, Saudi Arabia)
- The Hearing – Lisa Gerig (Switzerland)
- In the Rearview – Maciej Hamela (Poland, France, Ukraine)
- Light Falls Vertical – Efthymia Zymvragaki (Spain, Germany, Italy, the Netherlands)
- Motherland – Hanna Badziaka & Alexander Mihalkovich (Sweden, Ukraine, Norway)
- On the Adamant – Nicolas Philibert (France, Japan)
- Orlando, My Political Biography – Paul B. Preciado (France)
- Our Body – Claire Simon (France)
- Paradise – Alexander Abaturov (France, Switzerland)
- Smoke Sauna Sisterhood – Anna Hints (Estonia, France, Iceland)
- We Will Not Fade Away – Alisa Kovalenko (Ukraine, France, Poland)
- Who I Am Not – Tunde Skovran (Romania, Canada, Germany)

=== Short films ===
The European Short Film 2023 is presented in co-operation with the following European film festivals. At each of the festivals, a jury appointed by the festival chooses a single candidate.

- Airhostess-737 – Thanasis Neofotistos (Greece) – selected at International Short Film Festival of Cyprus
- Asterión – Francesco Montagner (Czechia, Slovakia) – selected at Riga International Film Festival
- Aqueronte – Manuel Muñoz Rivas (Spain) = selected at Drama International Short Film Festival
- Been There – Corina Schwingruber Ilić (Switzerland) – selected at Locarno Film Festival
- The Birthday Party – Francesco Sossai (Germany, Italy, France) – selected at Curtas Vila do Conde – International Film Festival
- Chords – Estibaliz Urresola Solaguren (Spain) – selected at Go Short – International Short Film Festival
- Daydreaming So Vividly About Our Spanish Holidays – Christian Avilés (Spain) – selected at DokuFest – International Documentary and Short Film Festival
- The Debutante – Elizabeth Hobbs (UK) – selected at Black Nights Film Festival – PÖFF Shorts
- Emotional Architecture 1959 – Mona León Siminiani (Spain) – selected at Valladolid International Film Festival
- A Free Run – Lauriane Lagarde (France) – selected at Uppsala Short Film Festival
- Hardly Working – Susanna Flock, Leonhard Müllner, Robin Klengel & Michael Stumpf (Austria) – selected at Internationale Kurzfilmtage Winterthur
- Headspace – Aisling Byrne (Ireland) – selected at Cork International Film Festival
- How I Learned to Hang Laundry – Barbara Zemljič (Slovenia) – selected at Sarajevo Film Festival
- I Can See the Sun But I Can't Feel It Yet – Joseph Wilson (UK) – selected at Kurzfilm Festival Hamburg
- I Think of Silences When I Think of You – Jonelle Twum (Sweden) – selected at International Short Film Festival Oberhausen
- Les Chenilles – Michelle Keserwany & Noel Keserwany (France) – selected at Berlin International Film Festival
- Papa – Notes on Life and Death – Andreas Bøggild Monies (Denmark) – selected at OFF – Odense International Film Festival
- Red Ears – Paul Drey (Germany) – selected at Tampere Film Festival
- Remember How I Used to Ride a White Horse – Ivana Bošnjak Volda & Thomas Johnson Volda (Croatia) – VIENNA SHORTS – International Short Film Festival
- A Short Trip – Erenik Beqiri (France) – selected at Venice Film Festival
- There Are People in the Forest – Szymon Ruczyński (Poland) – selected at Kraków Film Festival
- Things Unheard Of – Ramazan Kiliç (Turkey) – selected at Motovun Film Festival
- 27 – Flóra Anna Buda (France, Hungary) – selected at Cannes Film Festival
- Women Visiting the City – Enrique Buelo (Spain, France) – selected at Clermont-Ferrand International Short Film Festival
- Zoon – Jonatan Schwenk (Germany) – selected at ZINEBI – International Festival of Documentary and Short Film of Bilbao and at Leuven International Short Film Festival

== Feature Film Awards ==
=== European Film ===
English title	Director(s)	Producer(s)
Anatomy of a Fall	(France) Justine Triet	(France) Marie-Ange Luciani (France) David Thion
Fallen Leaves	(Finland) Aki Kaurismäki	(Germany) Reinhard Brundig (Finland) Misha Jaari (Finland) Aki Kaurismäki (Finland) Mark Lwoff
Green Border	(Poland) Agnieszka Holland	(United States) Fred Bernstein (Poland) Agnieszka Holland (Poland) Marcin Wierzchoslawski
Me Captain	(Italy) Matteo Garrone	(Italy) Paolo Del Brocco (Italy) Matteo Garrone (Belgium) Joseph Rouschop (France) Ardavan Safaee
The Zone of Interest	(United Kingdom) Jonathan Glazer	(Poland) Ewa Puszczyńska (United Kingdom) James Wilson

=== European Director ===
Director(s)	English title
(France) Justine Triet	Anatomy of a Fall
(Finland) Aki Kaurismäki	Fallen Leaves
(Poland) Agnieszka Holland	Green Border
(Italy) Matteo Garrone	Me Captain
(United Kingdom) Jonathan Glazer	The Zone of Interest

=== European Screenwriter ===
Screenwriter(s)	English title
(France) Arthur Harari (France) Justine Triet	Anatomy of a Fall
(Finland) Aki Kaurismäki	Fallen Leaves
(Poland) Agnieszka Holland (Poland) Gabriela Łazarkiewicz-Sieczko (Poland) Maciej Pisuk	Green Border
(Germany) İlker Çatak (Germany) Johannes Duncker	The Teachers' Lounge
(United Kingdom) Jonathan Glazer	The Zone of Interest

=== European Actor ===
Actor	English title	Role
(Denmark) Mads Mikkelsen	The Promised Land	Ludvig Kahlen
(Austria) Thomas Schubert	Afire	Leon
(Finland) Jussi Vatanen	Fallen Leaves	Holappa
(United Kingdom) Josh O'Connor	La chimera	Arthur
(Germany) Christian Friedel	The Zone of Interest	Rudolf Höss

=== European Actress ===
Actor	English title	Role
(Germany) Sandra Hüller	Anatomy of a Fall	Sandra Voyter
(Georgia (country)) Eka Chavleishvili	Blackbird Blackbird Blackberry	Etero
(Finland) Alma Pöysti	Fallen Leaves	Ansa
(United Kingdom) Mia McKenna-Bruce	How to Have Sex	Tara
(Germany) Leonie Benesch	The Teachers' Lounge	Carla Nowak
(Germany) Sandra Hüller	The Zone of Interest	Hedwig Höss

=== Excellence Awards ===
European Cinematography	European Editing	European Production Design	European Costume Design
(Denmark) Rasmus Videbæk for The Promised Land	(France) Laurent Sénéchal for Anatomy of a Fall	(Italy) Emita Frigato for La chimera	(Sweden) Kicki Ilander for The Promised Land

European Make-Up & Hair	European Original Score	European Sound	European Visual Effects
(Spain) Ana López-Puigcerver, (Spain) Belén López-Puigcerver, (Spain) David Martí & (Spain) Montse Ribé for Society of the Snow	(Austria) Markus Binder for Club Zero	(United Kingdom) Johnnie Burn & (United Kingdom) Tarn Willers for The Zone of Interest	(Spain) Félix Bergés & (Spain) Laura Pedro for Society of the Snow

== Awards Not Based on Feature Film Selection ==
=== European Discovery – Prix FIPRESCI ===
Director(s)	English title
(United Kingdom) Molly Manning Walker	How to Have Sex
(Spain) Estibaliz Urresola Solaguren	20,000 Species of Bees
(Ukraine) Philip Sotnychenko	La Palisiada
(Denmark) Malene Choi	The Quiet Migration
(Croatia) Juraj Lerotić	Safe Place
(France) Stéphan Castang	Vincent Must Die

=== European Documentary ===
English title	Original title	Director(s)
Smoke Sauna Sisterhood	Savvusanna sõsarad	(Estonia) Anna Hints
Apolonia, Apolonia		(Denmark) Lea Glob
Four Daughters	Les Filles d'Olfa	(Tunisia) Kaouther Ben Hania
Motherland		(Belarus) Hanna Badziaka (Belarus) Alexander Mihalkovich
On the Adamant	Sur l’Adamant	(France) Nicolas Philibert

=== European Animated Feature Film ===
English title	Original title	Director(s)
Robot Dreams		(Spain) Pablo Berger
The Amazing Maurice		(Germany) Toby Genkel
Chicken for Linda!	Linda veut du poulet!	(France) Sébastien Laudenbach (Italy) Chiara Malta
A Greyhound of a Girl		(Italy) Enzo D'Alò
White Plastic Sky	Müanyag égbolt	(Hungary) Tibor Bánóczki (Hungary) Sarolta Szabó

=== European Short Film ===
English title	Original title	Director(s)
Hardly Working		(Austria) Susanna Flock (Austria) Robin Klengel (Austria) Leonhard Müllner (Austria) Michael Stumpf
27		(Hungary) Flóra Anna Buda
Aqueronte		(Spain) Manuel Muñoz Rivas
Daydreaming So Vividly About Our Spanish Holidays	La herida luminosa	(Spain) Christian Avilés
Flores del otro patio		(Colombia) / (Switzerland) Jorge Cadena

== Honorary Awards ==
EFA Lifetime Achievement Award	Honorary Award of the Academy President and the Board	European Achievement in World Cinema
(United Kingdom) Vanessa Redgrave	(Hungary) Béla Tarr	(Spain) Isabel Coixet

European Innovative Storytelling	Eurimages Co-Production Award	European Sustainability Award – Prix4Climate
—N/a	(Lithuania) Uljana Kim	(Turkey) Güler Sabancı

== Special awards ==
=== Lux European Audience Film Award 2024 ===
The award is directed to recognize films which help to raise awareness of socio-political issues in Europe.

English title	Original title	Director(s)
Fallen Leaves	Kuolleet lehdet	(Finland) Aki Kaurismäki
On the Adamant	Sur l'Adamant	(France) Nicolas Philibert
Smoke Sauna Sisterhood	Savvusanna sõsarad	(Estonia) Anna Hints
The Teachers' Lounge	Das Lehrerzimmer	(Germany) İlker Çatak
20,000 Species of Bees	20.000 especies de abejas	(Spain) Estibaliz Urresola Solaguren

=== European University Film Award (EUFA) ===
The nominees were announced on 5 October 2023. The nominated films will be viewed and discussed in 25 universities in 25 countries and each institution will select its favourite film. In early December, one student representative from each university will attend a three-day deliberation meeting in Hamburg to decide on the overall winner. The winner will then be announced on 7 December, shortly before this year's European Film Awards Ceremony on 9 December in Berlin.

English title	Original title	Director(s)
Anatomy of a Fall	Anatomie d'une chute	(France) Justine Triet
Green Border	Zielona granica	(Poland) Agnieszka Holland
Housekeeping for Beginners		(Australia) / (North Macedonia) Goran Stolevski
How to Have Sex		(United Kingdom) Molly Manning Walker
The Teachers' Lounge	Das Lehrerzimmer	(Germany) İlker Çatak
