= Philippe Hersant =

French composer (born 1948)

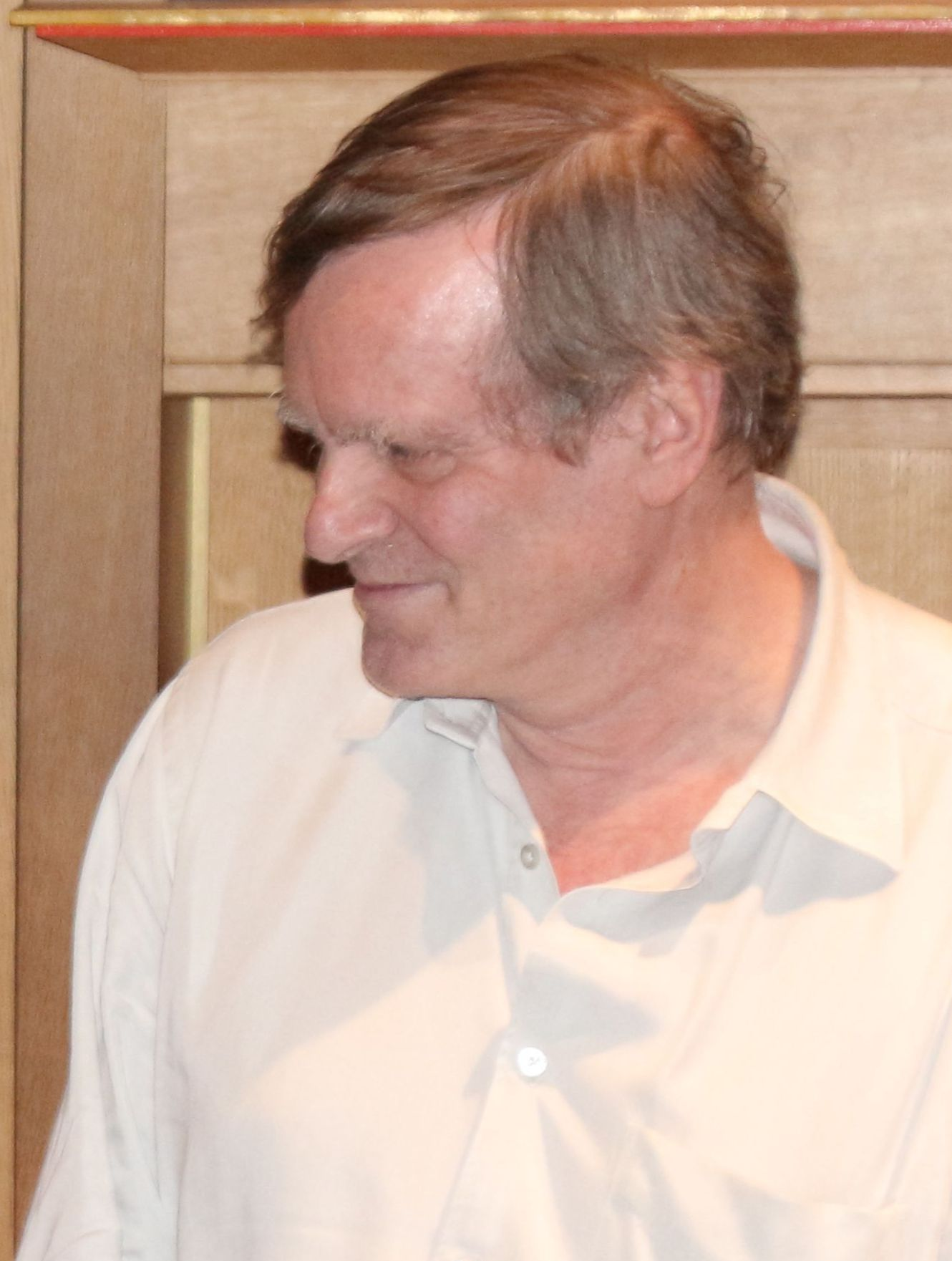
Philippe Hersant

Philippe Hersant (French pronunciation: [filip ɛʁsɑ̃]; born 21 June 1948 in Rome) is a French composer. He studied at the Conservatoire de Paris.

== Selected works ==
Hersant's works are largely published by Éditions Durand.

Stage

- Le Château des Carpathes, Opera in a prologue and 2 scenes (1989–1991); libretto by Jorge Silva Melo after the novel by Jules Verne
- Wuthering Heights, Ballet in 2 acts (2000–2001); based on the novel by Emily Brontë
- Le Moine noir, Opera in 8 scenes (2003–2005); libretto by Yves Hersant after the short story The Black Monk by Anton Chekhov
- Les Éclairs, Opera ("drame joyeux") in 4 acts (2021); libretto by Jean Echenoz after his novel Des éclairs

Orchestral

- Aztlan (1983)
- Stances (1978, revised 1992)
- Le Cantique des 3 enfants dans la fournaise (1995), poem by Antoine Godeau, in front of La Messe à 4 Choeurs H.4 by Marc-Antoine Charpentier with same chorus and orchestra. (recorded in 2019)
- 5 Pièces (1997)
- Patmos for string orchestra (2007)

Concertante

- Concerto No. 1 for cello and orchestra (1989)
- Concerto No. 2 for cello and orchestra (1996–1997)
- Streams for piano and orchestra (2000)
- Concerto for violin and orchestra (2003)
- Musical humors, Concerto for viola and string orchestra (2003)
- Le Tombeau de Virgile for harp and orchestra (2006)
- Concerto for clarinet and orchestra (2011)

Chamber music

- String Quartet No. 1 (1985)
- Pavane for viola solo (1987)
- String Quartet No. 2 (1988)
- Élégie for string quartet (1990)
- Duo Séphardim for viola and bassoon (1993)
- 11 Caprices for 2 violins (or violas) (1994)
- 8 Duos for viola and bassoon (1995)
- Niggun for solo bassoon (1995)
- Cinq miniatures for solo alto flute or C flute (1995)
- In nomine for 7 cellos (2001)
- 3 Nocturnes for flute, viola and harp (2001)
- Sonata for cello solo (2003)
- Choral for cello and harp (2004)
- Tenebrae for viola and piano (2005)
- 6 Bagatelles for clarinet, viola and piano (2007)

Film scores

Year	French title (original title)	English title	Director	Notes
1987	O Desejado (Les Montagnes de la lune)		Paulo Rocha	
1990	La Ville Louvre	Louvre City	Nicolas Philibert	documentary
1991	Arthur Rimbaud, une biographie	Arthur Rimbaud: A Biography	Richard Dindo	
1994	Lettre pour L...	Letter for L...	Romain Goupil	
1995	La Restitution		Catherine Zins	
1996	Un animal, des animaux	Animals and More Animals	Nicolas Philibert	documentary
1998	L'interview		Xavier Giannoli	short film: 25 minutes
1998	Qui sait?		Nicolas Philibert	documentary
2002	Être et Avoir	To Be and to Have	Nicolas Philibert	documentary
2008	Les Caravage de Philippe de Béthune		Michel Van Zele	documentary
2010	Nénette	Nénette	Nicolas Philibert	documentary; music also by Pascal Gallois
2010	Les mains en l'air	Hands Up	Romain Goupil	
