= At Averroès & Rosa Parks =

2024 documentary film by Nicolas Philibert

- Official poster
- Directed by: Nicolas Philibert
- Produced by: Miléna Poylo; Gilles Sacuto; Céline Loiseau
- Cinematography: Nicolas Philibert
- Edited by: Nicolas Philibert
- Music by: Sarah Murcia; Magic Malik
- Production companies: Les Films du Losange; TS Productions
- Distributed by: Les Films du Losange
- Release dates: 16 February 2024 (Berlinale); 20 March 2024 (France)
- Running time: 143 minutes
- Country: France
- Language: French

At Averroès & Rosa Parks (French: Averroès & Rosa Parks) is a 2024 documentary film directed by Nicolas Philibert. The film is part of a triptych of feature documentaries devoted to patients and caregivers in Paris’ Central Psychiatric Group.

It was selected in the Berlinale Special at the 74th Berlin International Film Festival, where it had its world premiere on 16 February 2024. The film was also nominated for the Berlinale Documentary Film Award.

It was theatrically released in France on 20 March 2024.

== Content ==
Averroès and Rosa Parks: two sections of the Esquirol Hospital Center that are part of the same psychiatric center as Adamant in Paris. Nicolas Philibert has tried to capture a kind of psychiatry that still aims to listen and heal the patients’ stories. Gradually, they reveal their inner worlds. In a health system that is running out of resources, how can they bring isolated people back to a common world?

== Production ==
The film triptych of feature documentaries devoted to patients and caregivers in Paris’ Central Psychiatric Group is second in the series after 2023 film On the Adamant. The first film was of a unique floating structure moored on the Seine River devoted to caring for people with mental disorders, whereas At Averroes & Rosa Parks tells of more classic facilities. The director said that “while the Adamant attracts attention, the other structures, more classical, are no less essential.” He further said that At Averroès & Rosa Parks “is an extension of the first film. It’s a little as if, after having filmed the stage, this time I was showing the wings and basement.”

TS Productions produced the film with Les Films du Losange. Nicolas Philibert, the director also acted as director of photography and the editor, whereas music was composed by Sarah Murcia with Magic Malik based on The Hymn of Joy by Henry van Dyke Jr. on Symphony No. 9 by Ludwig van Beethoven.

== Release ==
At Averroès & Rosa Parks had its world premiere on 16 February 2024, as part of the 74th Berlin International Film Festival, in Berlinale Special.

It was released in French theaters on 20 March 2024 by Les Films du Losange.

Post its theatrical release, it will also be screened at the 48th Hong Kong International Film Festival on 4 April 2024 in Firebird Awards Documentary competition.

The documentary was screened in 'Insights' at the 2024 Vancouver International Film Festival on 1 October 2024. A fortnight later, it was also presented in Strands: Love section of the 2024 BFI London Film Festival on 16 October 2024.

The film was selected in the Standpoint section of the 35th Singapore International Film Festival and was screened on 1 December 2024.

== Reception ==
On the AlloCiné, which lists 26 press reviews, the film obtained an average rating of 4/5.

Fabien Lemercier reviewing the film at Berlinale for Cineuropa wrote, "Nicolas Philibert sends a powerful message embedded within a very high-level documentary."

Jonathan Romney wrote in ScreenDaily giving a positive review, "A tougher watch than its predecessor, but an extremely accomplished and compelling work."

Jordan Mintzer reviewing the film for The Hollywood Reporter termed it as "Endearing and eye-opening," and opined, "By giving the patients considerable time and space to bare themselves before the camera, Philibert grants us access to the darker sides of the human psyche, portraying mental illness with an innate sense of compassion and understanding."

== Accolades ==
In August 2024, the film was selected for nomination to 37th European Film Awards to be held at Kultur- und Kongresszentrum Luzern in Lucerne on 7 December 2024.

Award	Date of ceremony	Category	Recipient	Result	Ref.
Berlin International Film Festival	25 February 2024	Berlinale Documentary Film Award	At Averroès & Rosa Parks	Nominated	
