= Nénette =

- Directed by: Nicolas Philibert
- Produced by: Serge Lalou
- Starring: Nénette
- Cinematography: Katell Djian; Nicolas Philibert
- Edited by: Léa Masson; Nicolas Philibert
- Music by: Pascal Gallois; Philippe Hersant
- Distributed by: Les Films du Losange
- Release dates: 15 February 2010 (Berlinale); 31 March 2010 (France)
- Running time: 70 minutes
- Country: France
- Language: French

Nénette is a 2010 French documentary film about a 40-year-old female orangutan living in the menagerie of the Jardin des Plantes, (the zoo in Paris, France). The film, directed by Nicolas Philibert presents an intimate portrait of the ape, originally from Borneo, who has spent most of her life in captivity. In accord with the Cinéma vérité style of Philibert's earlier works, the camera rests on Nénette and her son Tübo in their glass-fronted enclosure. We hear the conversations and see the reflections of the zoo visitors in the glass as they regard Nénette, a mother of four who has survived three mates.

== Reception ==
Nenette has received positive reviews from critics, scoring 83% positive on Rotten Tomatoes, with an average score of 7.6/10. Some positive reviews have praised how the film is shot centred on Nenette and raises questions about her life and captivity. Total Film magazine awarded Nenette 4 stars with reviewer Tom Dawson saying "If the tea-drinking Nénette remains an enigmatic figure, Philibert makes fascinatingly clear how we humans project our own feelings and thoughts onto her". Other good reviews have come from Empire magazine and Sight & Sound.
