= Saint-Étienne-sur-Usson =

- Commune
- Coat of arms
- Location of Saint-Étienne-sur-Usson
- Location within France Location within Auvergne-Rhône-Alpes
- Coordinates: 45°30′25″N 3°24′48″E
- Country: France
- Region: Auvergne-Rhône-Alpes
- Department: Puy-de-Dôme
- Arrondissement: Issoire
- Canton: Brassac-les-Mines
- Intercommunality: Agglo Pays d'Issoire

Government
  - Mayor (2020–2026): Lionel Chanimbaud
- Area^{1}: 15.58 km^{2} (6.02 sq mi)
- Elevation: 800 m (2,600 ft)
- Highest elevation: 815 m (2,674 ft)
- Lowest elevation: 461 m (1,512 ft)
- Population (2023): 268
  - Density: 17.2/km^{2} (44.6/sq mi)
- Time zone: UTC+01:00 (CET)
  - Summer (DST): UTC+02:00 (CEST)
- INSEE/Postal code: 63340 /63580
- ^{1} French Land Register data, which excludes lakes, ponds, glaciers > 1 km^{2} (0.386 sq mi or 247 acres) and river estuaries.

Saint-Étienne-sur-Usson (French pronunciation: [sɛ̃.t‿etjɛn syʁ ysɔ̃], literally Saint-Étienne on Usson; Auvergnat: Sent Estève d’Içon) is a commune in the south-central French department of Puy-de-Dôme, in Auvergne.

It is the setting for the 2002 documentary film To Be and to Have (French: Être et avoir), about the commune's one-room primary school.

== See also ==
- Communes of the Puy-de-Dôme department
