= In the Land of the Deaf =

- Japanese version of promotional poster
- Directed by: Nicolas Philibert
- Written by: Nicolas Philibert
- Produced by: BBC; Canal+; Fondation de France; La Sept-cinéma; RAI Tre; Télévision Suisse Romande
- Cinematography: Frédéric Labourasse
- Edited by: Guy Lecorne
- Release date: 1992
- Running time: 99 minutes
- Country: France
- Languages: French; French Sign Language

In the Land of the Deaf (French title Le Pays Des Sourds) is a French documentary created and produced by Nicolas Philibert in 1992. The film is presented French Sign Language (FSL) and French, with English subtitles and closed captions. Philibert uses sparse dialogue in creating an unsentimental, non-manipulative work which allows its subjects to communicate their feelings about the richness of life despite hearing problems.

Prior to its initial theatrical release, this excursion into the unique world of Deaf communities in France was featured in international film festivals.

In its subsequent broadcast debut in the United States, the film was honored with a Peabody Award for excellence.

== Synopsis ==
This film focuses on the interrelationships between Deaf culture and language in France. Its overview encompasses a broad range of perspectives, contrasting the stories of a family who has been deaf and thriving for five generations with the story of a woman whose deafness was misunderstood, causing her to be confined for a time in an asylum for the insane. The documentary features d/Deaf and hard of hearing people of all ages and from all walks of life. With their profound deafness in common, the children and adults featured in this film communicate their dreams and thoughts through sign language. In one segment, Philibert focuses his camera on group of schoolchildren who are learning how to communicate in a world where they must read lips and speak words. The personal lives of some of the pupils and various adults are explored, including an actor, a sign-language teacher, and an engaged couple.

== Production ==
=== Financing ===
This documentary was co-produced by multinational partners, which reduced the financial risks inherent in the project; and co-production also ensured enhanced distribution opportunities.

- Les Films d'Ici.
- La Sept-cinéma.
- Rhône-Alpes European Cinematographic Centre.
- Canal +.
- Rhône-Alpes région.
- Centre National de la Cinématographie.
- Fondation de France.
- Ministry of Foreign Affairs (France).
- Rai Tre.
- BBC Television.
- Télévision Suisse Romande.

=== Filming ===
Filming took place between July and December 1991 in Grenoble (Isère), Chambéry (Savoie) and Saint-Étienne (Loire).

== Film festivals and honors ==
This small film has attracted an appreciative international audience. The quotidian life of the deaf as presented by Philibert is distinguished by an unsentimental compassion and an affirmation of the serendipitous.

- Locarno International Film Festival (Switzerland), official selection, 1992.
- Yamagata International Documentary Film Festival (Japan), official selection, 1993.
- Cannes Film Festival (France), Prix de la Fondation GAN pour le Cinéma, 1992.
- Festival dei Popoli (Italy), Grand Prize, 1992.
- Vancouver International Film Festival (Canada), Grand Prize, 1993.
- Valladolid International Film Festival (Spain), Special Jury Prize (Prix «Tiempo de Historia»), 1993.
- Mumbai International Film Festival (India), Grand Prize, 1994.
- San Francisco International Film Festival (USA), Golden Gate Award, 1994.
- Potsdam International Film Festival (Germany), Best Documentary, 1994.
- "Stephanie Beacham Award, 1994". Communication Awards.
- Peabody Award (USA), 1997.

== See also ==
- List of Peabody Award winners (1990-1999)
- List of films featuring the deaf and hard of hearing
