= Le Château des Carpathes (opera) =

Opera by Philippe Hersant

Le Château des Carpathes (French pronunciation: [lə ʃato de kaʁpat]) is a French-language opera by Philippe Hersant to a libretto by Jorge Silva Melo (born 1948) based on the novel Le Château des Carpathes by Jules Verne. The opera was performed in concert in 1992, first fully staged in 1993, in a staging by André Wilms, then again in 1994.

== Roles ==
- La Stilla: Sylvie Valayre
- L'Aubergiste: Isabel Garcisanz
- Franz de Télek: Christer Bladin
- Baron de Garz: Marcel Vanaud

== Recording ==
- Le Château des Carpathes, original cast: Sylvie Valayre, Isabel Garcisanz, Christer Bladin, Marcel Vanaud, Orchestre Philharmonique de Montpellier, David Robertson (conductor) 2-CD album. Accord 1993
