= Mona León Siminiani =

- Born: Mónica León Siminiani; 1974 (age 51–52); Santander, Spain
- Education: Pontifical University of Salamanca; Complutense University of Madrid; EICTV (Cuba)
- Occupations: Creator of audiovisual formats and content, director, screenwriter, sound designer, voice-over artist, podcaster, presenter and producer
- Years active: 1990s–present
- Known for: Negra y criminal; ¿Hablas Miedo?; Muy de Sherlock Holmes; Jodidísimas
- Relatives: Elías León Siminiani (brother)
- Website: Formidable Factory La Sonora

Mónica León Siminiani (Santander, 1974), known professionally as Mona León Siminiani, is a Spanish creator, director, screenwriter, radio producer, voice-over artist, actress, presenter, and executive producer.

Considered one of the early creators to popularize the podcast format in Spain, León Siminiani has written, directed, and produced numerous Spanish language true crime and audio fiction series since 2013.

Her productions, including Negra y criminal and ¿Hablas Miedo?, have been described in Spanish media as examples of high-quality sound fiction distinguished by careful scripting, strong voice performances, and cinematic sound design, elements that frequently include her own narration.

She is best known for the radio show and podcast Negra y criminal, which she also presented. The show ran between 2015 and 2019 on Cadena SER and Podium Podcast for five seasons. In it, real true crime cases alternated with adaptations of classic horror, mystery, suspense, and psychological thriller stories, blending investigative rigor with a captivating, imaginative audio universe through cinematic storytelling and evocative soundscapes.

In 2019, she founded her own production company, Formidable Factory La Sonora. In 2020, Negra y criminal continued on Audible under the title ¿Hablas Miedo?, which Spanish media highlighted as one of the flagship titles of Audible's fiction catalogue for its production quality and narrative design.

Also on Audible, Mona has created, directed, and produced audio series across multiple genres, including Muy de Sherlock Holmes (since 2021), whose third season premiered in May 2025, starring Pepe Viyuela and Enrique Martínez, winner of the 2024 Podcast Days Award for Best Fiction, and Jodidísimas, a dramatic comedy and eight-episode audio series written exclusively for Audible by María Dueñas, starring Lolita Flores (winner of the 2022 Ondas Global Podcast Award for Best Performance, ex aequo), Cayetana Guillén Cuervo, Anne Igartiburu, Alberto Ammann, Mariola Fuentes, Luz Cipriota, Carlos Scholz, and Mabel del Pozo, among others.

Between 2015 and 2019, Mona created, developed, directed, and produced several projects for Cadena SER and Podium Podcast: Una novela criminal, an adaptation of Jorge Volpi’s 2018 Alfaguara Prize-winning novel, featuring more than 40 actors; Las cronoficciones de SER Historia; and the annual Christmas radio stories for Cadena SER, including Mujercitas (2018), adapted by María Dueñas and starring Belén Rueda, Macarena García, Adriana Ozores, Maggie Civantos, Martiño Rivas, and Primitivo Rojas, and La gran familia (2017), featuring Imanol Arias, Adriana Ozores, José Sacristán, Nancho Novo, Luis Callejo, and José Luis García Pérez, among others.

In 2021, she directed the radio play Teatro Berlanga for the Filmoteca Española to commemorate the centenary of Spanish filmmaker Luis García Berlanga. Written by Bernardo Sánchez, Teatro Berlanga was performed by Pepe Viyuela, Nacho Marraco, and Mabel del Pozo.

She has collaborated with numerous creators, including César Pérez Gellida, author of Adefesio, an exclusive story for Negra y criminal, María Dueñas, and actors such as Pedro Casablanc, Ginés García Millán, and Goizalde Núñez. Between 2017 and 2019, she was also a contributor to Carles Francino’s radio show La ventana, with the weekly segment ¿Quién dijo Miedo?.

Earlier, in 2013, she created the audio format Extra Fantástica for Radio 3 Extra (Radio Nacional de España), a proto-podcast concept before the term "podcast" became known in Spain. These were short, twice-weekly pieces with diverse tones and themes based on what she called “illogical logic,” entirely written, voiced, and produced by herself.

In her work, she blends journalism with audio fiction, offering reflective introductions and immersive sound design with cinematic storytelling that transforms each story into a unique auditory experience. Her participation in audio fiction as the inner voice of the protagonist is one of her most distinctive stylistic trademarks. She is the sister of film director Elías León Siminiani.

== Early career ==
León Siminiani holds a degree in journalism from the Pontifical University of Salamanca and a master's degree from Radio Nacional de España / Complutense University of Madrid. She also studied advanced screenwriting at the EICTV in San Antonio de los Baños, Cuba, and acting and directing actors with Fernando Piernas (2004–2007).

She began her career at RNE, preparing interviews for Carlos Herrera on Radio 1 and later working at Radio 3 as a scriptwriter, presenter, and producer on programs such as Videodrome, Siglo 21, La ciudad invisible, El ojo de Ya Ve (with Federico Volpini), Satelitrés, Mundo Babel, and El séptimo vicio. In 2000, she collaborated with Carlos Faraco on the design and production of the serial Cuando Juan y Tula fueron a Siritinga as story editor and acting director.

Between 2004 and 2013, she combined various media roles. She was a screenwriter for several short films and television programs and a regular scriptwriter for the channels Calle 13 and SyFy of NBC Universal. From 2006 to 2010 she was the institutional voice of SyFy Spain. During this time, she also worked in Colombia, developing television series bibles for RCN and Caracol TV.

She has taught courses in radio production and podcasting at institutions such as Universidad Carlos III, COPE, La Casa Encendida, and Universidad Europea. She has also lectured at workshops, conferences, and festivals.

As a commercial voice-over artist, she has worked on advertising campaigns for Energías de Portugal (La Despensa, 2017), Renfe (Contrapunto/BBDO, 2006), and Banco Santander (Lee Films International, 2008), among others. She is also the narrator of 11 tiros, a documentary series about football and crime produced by Beta Spain for HBO Max (2022).
