= To Be and to Have =

To Be and to Have (Être et avoir)
- Theatrical release poster
- Directed by: Nicolas Philibert
- Written by: Nicolas Philibert
- Produced by: Gilles Sandoz
- Cinematography: Laurent Didier; Katell Djian; Hugues Gemignani; Nicolas Philibert
- Edited by: Nicolas Philibert
- Music by: Philippe Hersant
- Distributed by: Les Films du Losange
- Release dates: 19 May 2002 (Cannes); 28 August 2002 (France)
- Running time: 104 minutes
- Country: France
- Language: French
- Budget: €1 million
- Box office: $16.1 million

To Be and To Have (French: Être et avoir; also the UK title) is a 2002 French documentary film directed by Nicolas Philibert about a small rural school. It was screened as an "Out of Competition" film at the 2002 Cannes Film Festival and achieved commercial success. The film became the subject of an unsuccessful legal action by the school's teacher, who said that he and the children's parents had been misled about the film's intended audience, and that he and the children had been exploited.

The documentary's title translates as "to be and to have", the two auxiliary verbs in the French language. It is about a primary school in the commune of Saint-Étienne-sur-Usson, Puy-de-Dôme, France, the population of which is just over 200. The school has one small class of mixed ages (from four to twelve years), with a dedicated teacher, Mr Lopez, who shows patience and respect for the children as we follow their story through a single school year.

The film won several awards, including the 2003 Sacramento French Film Festival Audience Prize.

== Critical response ==
On Rotten Tomatoes, the film holds an approval rating of 97%, based on 59 reviews, with an average rating of 8.1/10. The site's critical consensus reads, "A small, sensitive, and moving portrait of a teacher and his students." On Metacritic the film has a score of 87 out of 100, based on 26 critics, indicating "universal acclaim".

== Lawsuit ==
Following the film's popularity in cinemas, Lopez, the principal personality in the documentary, made an unsuccessful attempt to sue the documentary's makers for a share of the €2 million profit. One of his main claims was that the film-makers had exploited his image without authorisation. French film unions warned that if Lopez had been successful it would have spelt "the death of the documentary, undermining the crucial principle that subjects should not be paid to participate".

Speaking after the court case, Lopez said that he, the children and their families had been misled by the film's production company about the purpose and intended audience of the film:

"We were misled. The production company told me and the children's families that they were making a small documentary about the phenomenon of the one-teacher village school and that the film would be used primarily for educational purposes. They said it would have a restricted screening, and never discussed marketing the film to make it such a commercial venture....We had no idea that it would be in cinemas all over the country, released on DVD or distributed abroad.

The court ruled that Lopez's attendance at the Cannes film festival, which he attended with some of the students, and his repeated public expressions of satisfaction at its success, constituted his tacit acceptance of the use of his image.

The French media had been critical of Lopez, with one newspaper carrying the headline: "To be and to have: the teacher would rather have." However Lopez said money was never his motivation: "I'm simply trying to make the film company recognise my rights." Lopez was supported in his action by the families of most of his former pupils, some of whom stated that they themselves would also sue the film company.

Lopez said the unexpected attention the film had brought the young students had traumatised some of them:

"One child, who had been very stable and happy until the film's release, was so distressed by his unexpected fame, that he started wetting the bed, and became afraid of the dark...Other children have been teased at their new secondary schools because of their involvement. All have been subjected to a great deal of stress as a direct consequence of the film."

== Accolades ==
Award / Film Festival	Category	Recipients and nominees	Result
BBC Four World Cinema Awards			Nominated
British Academy Film Awards	Best Film Not in the English Language		Nominated
César Awards	Best Film		Nominated
César Awards	Best Director	Nicolas Philibert	Nominated
César Awards	Best Editing	Nicolas Philibert	Won
Directors Guild of Great Britain	Outstanding Directorial Achievement in Foreign Language Film		Nominated
European Film Awards	Best Documentary		Won
French Syndicate of Cinema Critics	Best French Film		Won
Full Frame Documentary Film Festival	Jury Award		Won
London Film Critics Circle Awards	Foreign Language Film of the Year		Nominated
Louis Delluc Prize	Best Film		Won
National Society of Film Critics Awards	Best Non-Fiction Film		Won
Online Film & Television Association Award	Best Documentary Picture		Nominated
Valladolid International Film Festival	Best Documentary		Won
