= Lac de Guéry =

Lake in France

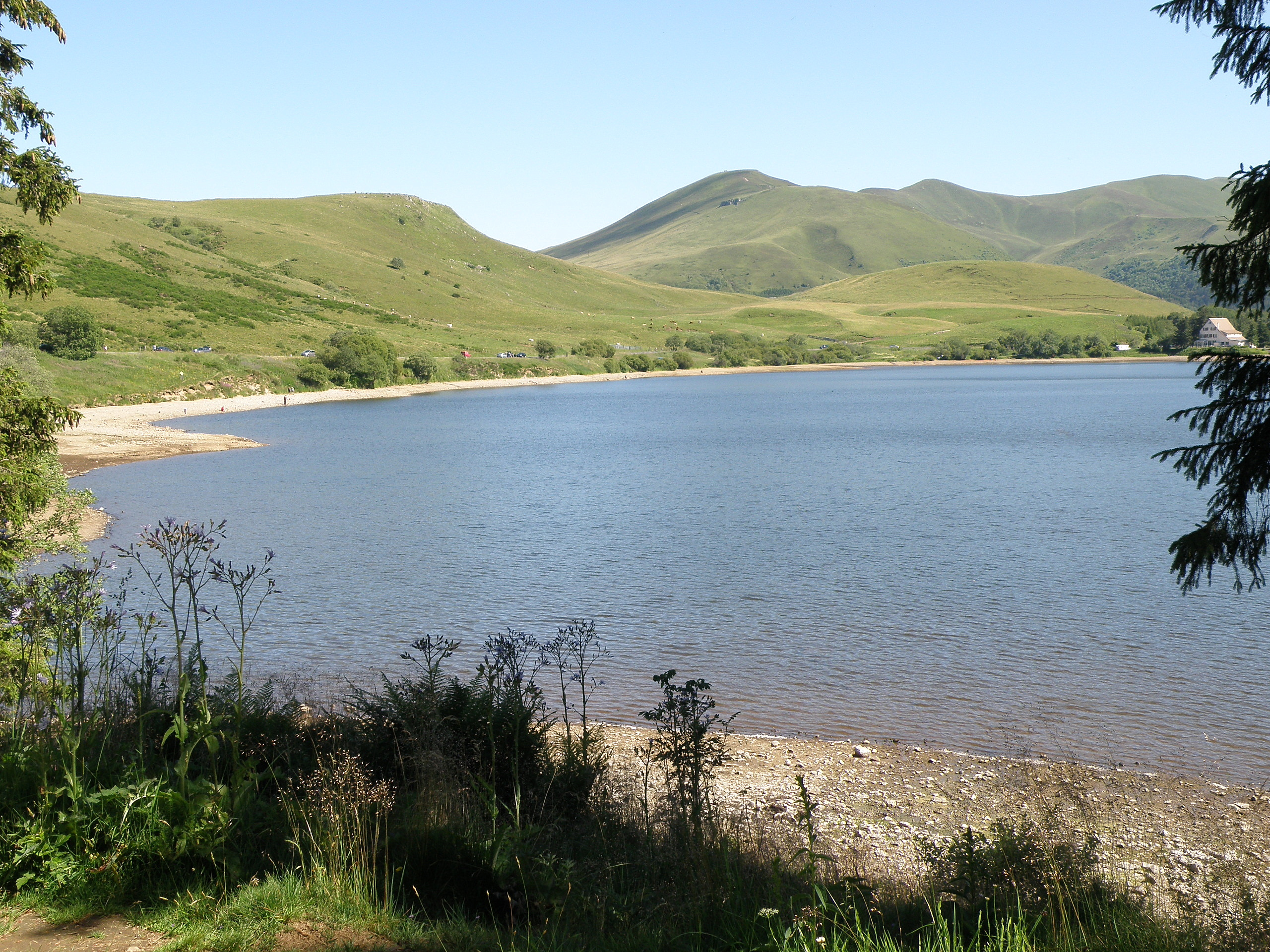

- Location within France
- Location: Puy-de-Dôme
- Coordinates: 45°37′N 2°50′E
- Basin countries: France
- Surface area: 0.25 km^{2} (0.097 sq mi)
- Max. depth: 16 m (52 ft)
- Surface elevation: 1,244 m (4,081 ft)

Lac de Guéry is a lake in Puy-de-Dôme, France. At an elevation of 1,244 metres (4,081 ft), its surface area is 0.25 square kilometres (0.097 sq mi).
