= On the Adamant =

2023 French documentary film

- Official Berlinale poster
- Directed by: Nicolas Philibert
- Produced by: Céline Loiseau; Gilles Sacuto; Miléna Poylo
- Cinematography: Nicolas Philibert
- Edited by: Janusz Baranek; Nicolas Philibert
- Production companies: TS Productions; France 3 Cinéma; LONGRIDE
- Distributed by: Les Films du Losange
- Release dates: 24 February 2023 (Berlinale); 19 April 2023 (France)
- Running time: 109 minutes
- Country: France
- Language: French
- Box office: $814,680

On the Adamant (French: Sur l'Adamant) is a 2023 French-language documentary film directed by Nicolas Philibert. The work portrays the floating structure L'Adamant Day Center, located on the Seine river in Paris. The structure is a special daycare center for the treatment of adults with mental disorders.

It won the Golden Bear at the 73rd Berlin International Film Festival, where it had its world premiere on 24 February 2023. The film was also nominated for the Berlinale Documentary Film Award. It was released in French cinemas on 19 April 2023.

== Content ==
The film is a portrait of the L'Adamant Day Center in Paris, France. It is a floating building located at the foot of the Pont Charles-de-Gaulle on the right bank of the Seine. The exclusive day center welcomes adults with mental disorders residing in the first four municipal arrondissements of Paris. The team that manages it is one of those that tries to resist as much as possible the decay and dehumanization of psychiatry.

It offers patients a daily routine and helps them regain their footing in everyday life with therapeutic workshops and psychosocial rehabilitation support. This film invites us to come on board to meet the patients and healthcare workers who invent their daily lives day after day. The Adamant team is made up of psychiatrists, psychologists, nurses, occupational therapists, specialized educators, psychomotor specialists, hospital staff and art therapists.

== Production ==
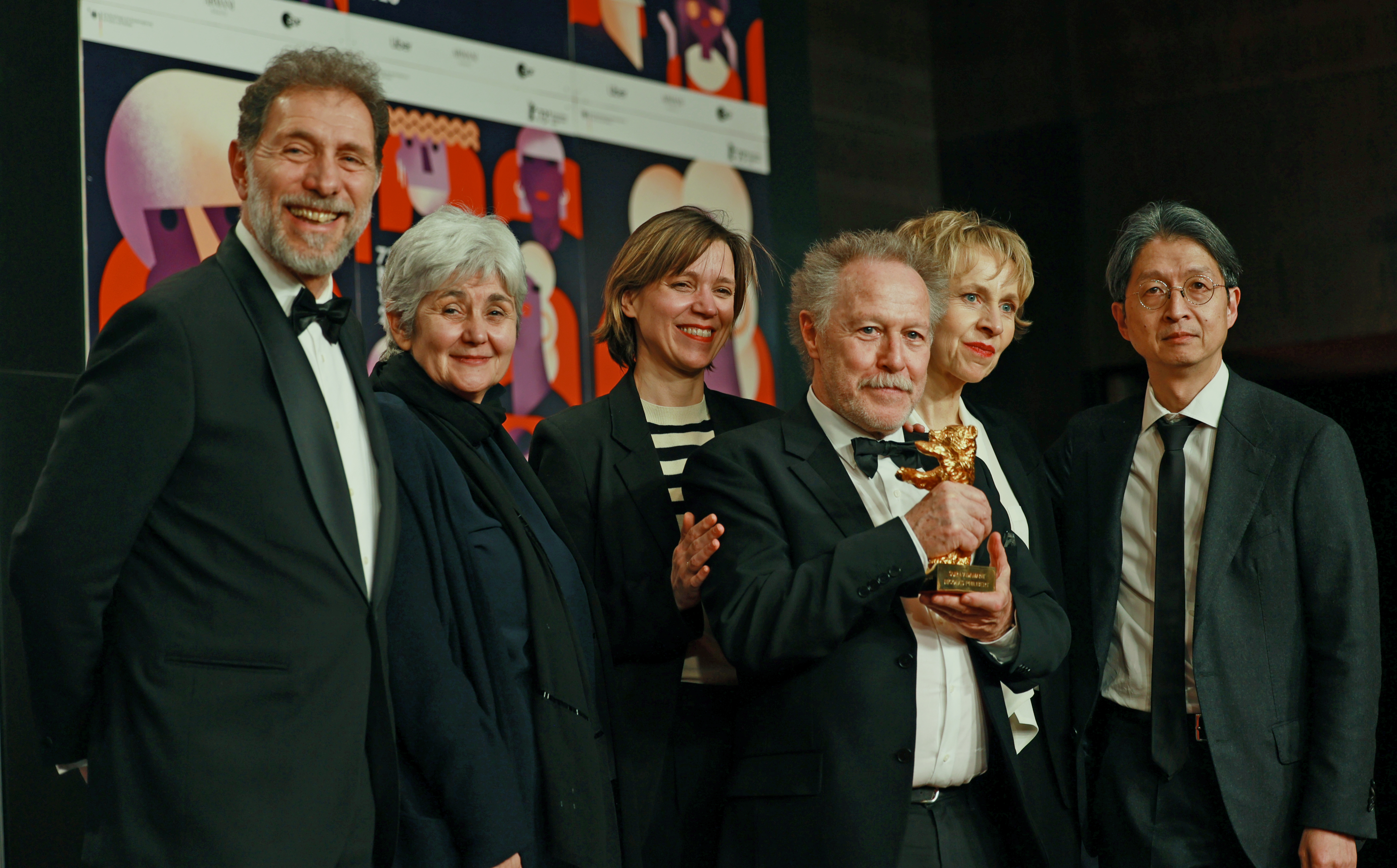
Film crew of On the Adamant

The director Nicolas Philibert was aware of the project of the Adamant in the early 2010s through psychologist and psychoanalyst Linda de Zitter, whom he had known since the filming of La Moindre des choses (lit. 'Nothing but trifles') in 1995. Seven or eight years later, when the project was completed, he met a workshop group at L'Adamant on their invitation and as he said, "I came away particularly invigorated, spurred on by the remarks of the people who were there." So, when he planned to make the documentary he was free of worries about the architecture of the film, he was convinced that the unity of place and the 'characters' would allow him an undisciplined construction, as he said "Following a character, losing him, finding him later, filming a meeting, a workshop, welcoming a newcomer, informal exchanges... And fixing all those little details that we might find trivial and which would become the very fabric of the film being made."

== Release ==
On the Adamant premiered on 24 February 2023 as part of the 73rd Berlin International Film Festival, in competition. As of March 2023, it is scheduled for release in French cinemas on 19 April 2023.

It was invited to Horizons section of 57th Karlovy Vary International Film Festival, where it was screened on 30 June 2023. The documentary also made to 2023 Cinéfest Sudbury International Film Festival held from September 16 to 24, 2023. The film competed at the 2023 Calgary International Film Festival in 'International Documentary Competition' for Best International Documentary Feature award and had screening on September 22.

The film was screened at the 28th Busan International Film Festival in 'Icon' section on 6 October, and was screened at the 2023 BFI London Film Festival in 'Strand' section under 'Debate' theme on 12 October, 2023.

The documentary was also invited to the 2023 Vancouver International Film Festival in 'Insights' section and screened on 5 October 2023. It was selected as European Documentary for the 36th European Film Awards held on 9 December 2023.

On 23 March 2024, it will be screened at the Sofia International Film Festival in European Parliament LUX Prize section.

== Reception ==
On the review aggregator Rotten Tomatoes website, the film has an approval rating of 95% based on 20 reviews, with an average rating of 7.3/10. On Metacritic, it has a weighted average score of 75 out of 100 based on 5 reviews, indicating "generally favorable reviews".

Jordan Mintzer, for The Hollywood Reporter, stating that the film presents "an artful look at outsider artists", opined that "On the Adamant ultimately becomes a moving testament to what people are capable of, if they could just find the right place to do it."

Guy Lodge, reviewing at the Berlin Film Festival for Variety, wrote, "On the Adamant might not achieve the crossover success Philibert has found in the past, but it's a warm reminder of his perceptive gifts...." Fabien Lemercier reviewing for Cineuropa praised the director: "Philibert's is a supple and natural approach, both methodical and poetic, which demonstrates great human and cinematographic understanding and which smoothly and modestly establishes contact in an environment where you have to find the right keys to connect."

Jonathan Romney for ScreenDaily wrote in a review that the film is "engaging and affirmative". Romney stated that, in contrast to the more detached observational approach of the Frederick Wiseman school, "The film is more about character and human presence, as opposed to depicting the overall functioning of this institution."

David Robb reviewing on Slant Magazine rated the film with two and a half out of four stars and opined that, "The task of representing mental illness and those afflicted by it can be a precarious tightrope walk for a documentarian ...", and appreciating the director's presentation, Robb wrote, "... and it's to Nicolas Philibert's credit that he mostly avoids tumbling into sensationalism or mawkish sentimentality."

== Accolades ==
While announcing the award Kristen Stewart, the jury president called the film "masterfully crafted" and a "cinematic proof of the vital necessity of human expression." Philibert asked in his acceptance speech if the jury members were "crazy" and yet nevertheless thanked them, saying "that documentary can be considered to be cinema in its own right touches me deeply."

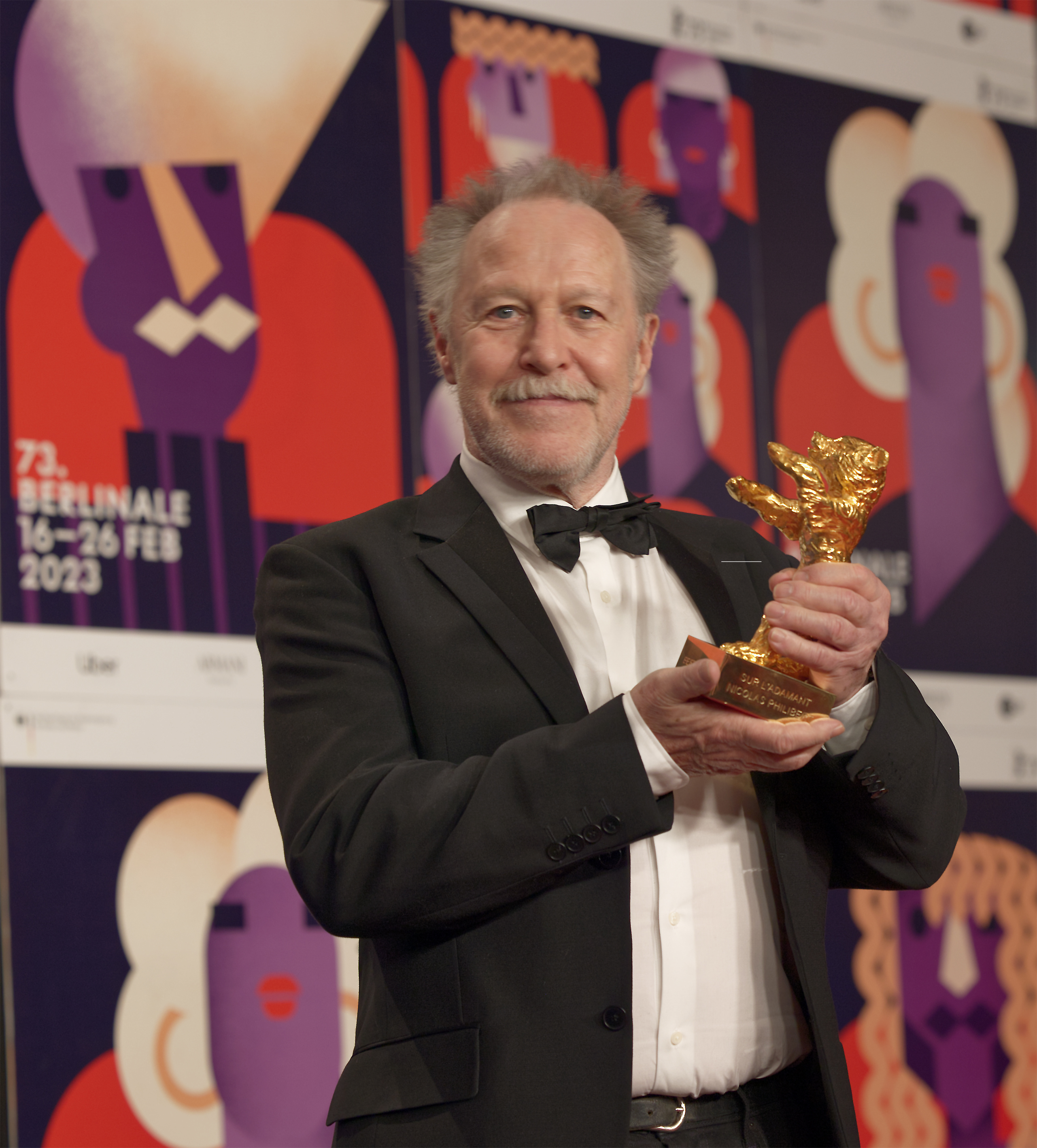
Nicolas Philibert, with the Golden Bear for On the Adamant

On the Adamant was nominated for European Documentary award in the 36th European Film Awards on 7 November. The awards ceremony took place on 9 December in Berlin.

| Award | Date | Category | Recipient | Result | Ref. |
|---|---|---|---|---|---|
| Berlin International Film Festival | 26 February 2023 | Golden Bear | On the Adamant | Won | |
| Berlin International Film Festival | 26 February 2023 | Berlinale Documentary Film Award | On the Adamant | Nominated | |
| Berlin International Film Festival | 26 February 2023 | Prize of the Ecumenical Jury: Special Mention | On the Adamant | Won | |
| European Film Awards | 9 December 2023 | European Documentary | On the Adamant | Nominated | |
| Lumière Awards | 22 January 2024 | Best Documentary | On the Adamant | Nominated | |
| César Awards | 23 February 2024 | Best Documentary Film | On the Adamant | Nominated | |
| European Film Academy | 16 April 2024 | Lux Award | On the Adamant | Nominated | |

=== Listicle ===
| Publisher | Year | Listicle | Placement | Ref. |
|---|---|---|---|---|
| Screen International | 2023 | 15 films that stood out at Berlin 2023 | 2nd | |
