= Pascal Gallois =

French bassoonist and conductor

Pascal Gallois (born 1959) is a French bassoonist, conductor and music teacher, specialising in contemporary classical music.

== Life ==
Born in Linselles near Lille, Gallois studied with Maurice Allard at the École Normale de Musique de Paris. Since 1981, he has been a member of the ensemble intercontemporain, soloist, alongside Pierre Boulez. He brings to the ensemble contemporary works for bassoon, both original and French premieres, as In Freundschaft by Karlheinz Stockhausen (recorded in 1984), and Sequenza XII by Luciano Berio, in 1995. As a conductor, he has conducted, among other things, of the Ensemble Orchestral Contemporain.

The development of the contemporary bassoon repertoire is one of his concerns. Composers such as György Kurtag, Olga Neuwirth, Philippe Fénelon, Brice Pauset, Toshio Hosokawa and Mark Andre write pieces for him which he creates and records.

From 1994 to 2000, he was professor at the Paris Conservatory and from 2001 to 2007 at the Zurich University of the Arts. He is also the author of Die Spieltechnik des Fagotts (The Bassoon Playing Technique), devoted to new playing techniques for bassoonists and composers. Since 2002, he has been teaching at the International Music Institute of Darmstadt.

Gallois is the father of the dancer and choreographer Jann Gallois.

== Discography ==
- Dialogues, with works by Pierre Boulez, György Kurtag, Philippe Schoeller. (Stradivarius) OCLC 52148364
- Voyages, with works by Luciano Berio, Toshio Hosokawa, Philippe Schoeller. (Stradivarius) OCLC 611554426
- # 3, with works by Olga Neuwirth, Dai Fujikura, Bruno Mantovani. (Stradivarius) OCLC 813209835

== Publication ==
- Die Spieltechnik des Fagotts (La technique de jeu du basson). (book with CD, Bärenreiter-Verlag) OCLC 939085370
