= Nicolas Philibert =

French film director

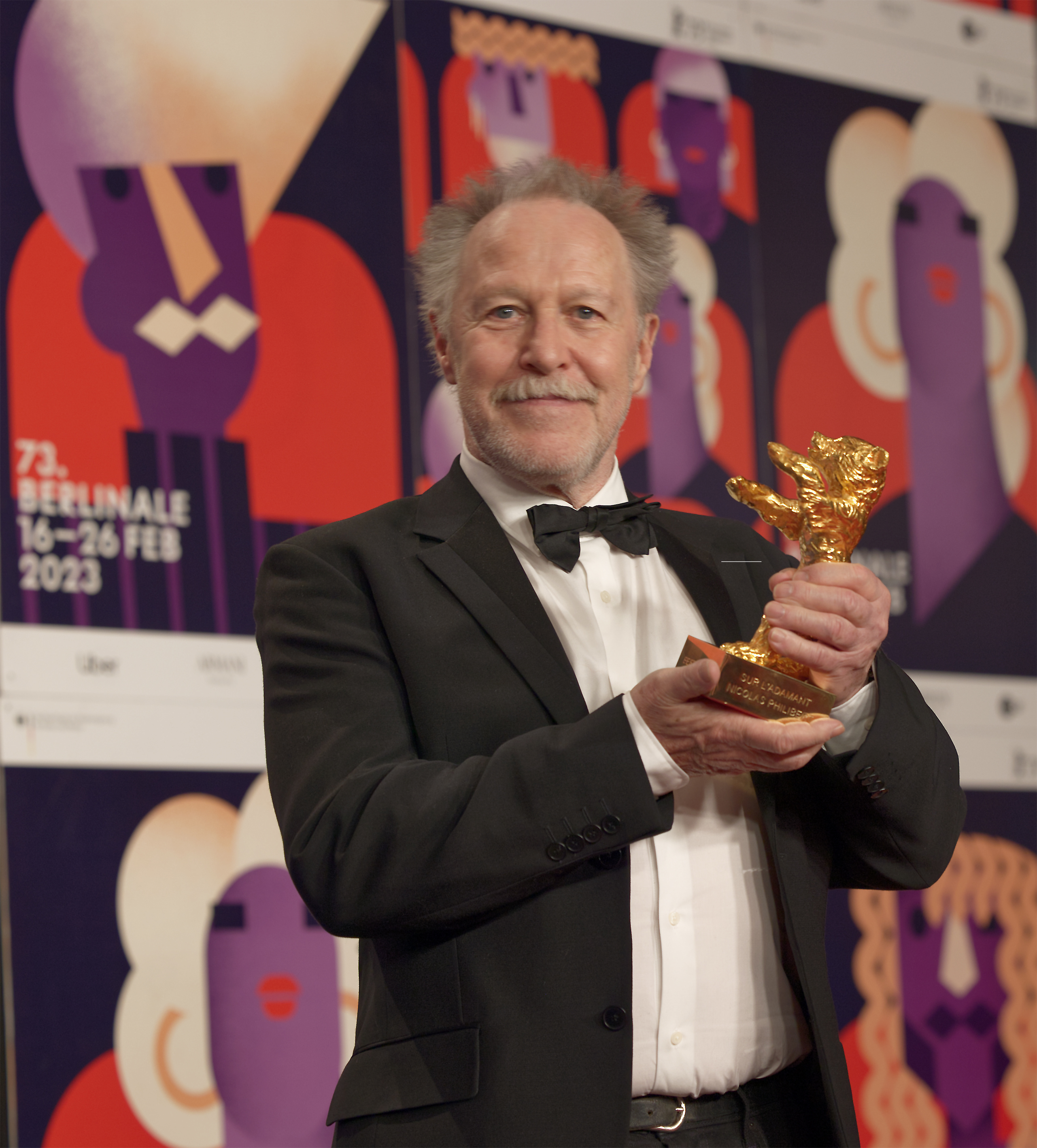
- Philibert in 2023, with the Golden Bear for On the Adamant
- Born: 10 January 1951 (age 75); Nancy, France
- Education: University of Grenoble
- Occupations: Film director, actor
- Years active: 1978-present

Nicolas Philibert (French: [nikɔla filibɛʁ]; born 10 January 1951) is a French film director and actor.

== Biography ==
Philibert was born in Nancy, France. He studied philosophy in the University of Grenoble. Philibert's father was a film lecturer and he attended his talks in his youth, which encouraged him to embark on a career in the film industry. He started it with filmmaker René Allio in 1970, as a trainee on Les Camisards and then as an assistant on Rude Journée pour la reine (1973), and assistant-director on Moi, Pierre Rivière, ayant égorgé ma mère, ma sœur et mon frère... (1975).

In 1978 he co-directed with Gérard Mordillat a feature documentary His Master's Voice, in which a dozen bosses of big industrial groups discuss power, leadership, hierarchies and the role of unions.

Between 1985 and 1987, he made several films about mountains and adventure for TV, then turned to making feature-length documentaries for theatrical distribution: La Ville Louvre (1990), Le Pays des sourds (1992), Un animal, des animaux (1995), La Moindre des choses (1996) - at the psychiatric clinic of La Borde, as well as an experimental film with the pupils of the theatre school Théâtre national de Strasbourg, Qui sait? (1998).

In 2001, Nicolas Philibert made Être et avoir, about daily life in a single class school on a small village in the Auvergne. It won the Prix Louis Delluc 2002, and became a box office and critical success in France and internationally. The film was screened out of competition at the 2002 Cannes Film Festival.

With Retour en Normandie (2007), he revisited the traces of a previous films, made thirty years earlier by René Allio, with local peasants playing the lead roles. With Nénette (2010), made at the Ménagerie du Jardin des plantes in Paris, he produced an intimated portrait of the most famous of its inhabitants a female orang-utang, Nénette, held in captivity for 36 years.

La Maison de la radio (2013), takes us into the heart of the French Radio headquarters in Paris, finding out who inhabits the place and discovering the mysteries of its long corridors.

Over the last fifteen years there have been more than 120 retrospectives or 'homages' to Philibert organised internationally including the British Film Institute (London) and the Museum of Modern Art (New York).

He was one of the directors invited to nominate his favourite films in the British Film Institute's 2012 poll.

He explains, in French, his motivations, his influences (including Agnès Varda) and the history of his career as a documentary film maker, especially the 'impermeable' frontiers between documentary and drama in an interview recorded in April 2012.

== Filmography ==
Year	English title	Original title	Note
1978	His Master's Voice	La Voix de son maître	
1985	Christophe		Short film
1987	Trilogy for One Man	Trilogie pour un homme seul	
1988	Baquet's Comeback	Le Come-back de Baquet	Short film
1988	Go for It, Lapébie!	Vas-y Lapébie !	Short film
1990	Louvre City	La Ville Louvre	
1992	In the Land of the Deaf	Le Pays des sourds	
1996	Animals	Un animal, des animaux	
1997	Every Little Thing	La Moindre des choses	
1999	Who Knows?	Qui sait?	
2002	To Be and to Have	Être et avoir	
2007	Back to Normandy	Retour en Normandie	
2010	Nénette		
2013	La Maison de la radio		
2018	Each and Every Moment	De chaque instant	
2023	On the Adamant	Sur l'Adamant	
2024	At Averroès & Rosa Parks	Averroès & Rosa Parks	
2024	The Typewriter and Other Headaches	La Machine à écrire et autres sources de tracas	
